= List of reptiles of Puerto Rico =

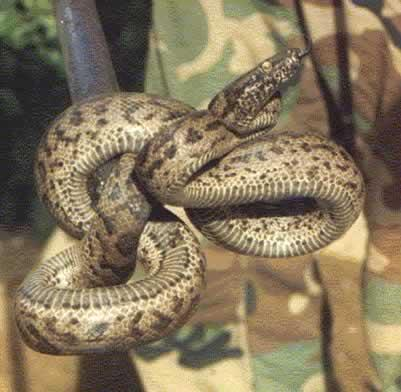
Puerto Rican boa

This is a list of the reptiles of the archipelago of Puerto Rico. The Puerto Rican archipelago consists of the main island of Puerto Rico, two island municipalities, Vieques and Culebra, one minor uninhabited island, Mona and several smaller islands and cays.

This list only includes animals with verifiable established populations in the archipelago of Puerto Rico. Many species of reptiles are imported, both legally (mainly through the pet industry) and illegally, to the archipelago of Puerto Rico every year, with some of these species being subsequently released into the wild. However, non-viable introduced species do not constitute a breeding population and hence they lack inclusion in this list.

The following tags help provide additional information regarding the status of each species.

- ^{[e]} Endemic species
- ^{[i]} Introduced species
- ^{[ext]} Extinct species
- ^{[ex]} Extirpated species

== Reptiles ==
=== Family Emydidae ===
Species	Common name	Puerto Rico	Culebra	Vieques	Mona	Other
Trachemys stejnegeri stejnegeri	Puerto Rican slider	X				
Trachemys scripta elegans ^{[i]}	Red-eared slider	X				
Trachemys decorata ^{[i]}	Hispaniolan slider	X				
Chrysemys picta picta	Eastern painted turtle	X				

=== Family Dermochelyidae ===
Species	Common name	Puerto Rico	Culebra	Vieques	Mona	Other
Dermochelys coriacea coriacea	Leatherback sea turtle	X	X			

=== Family Cheloniidae ===
Species	Common name	Puerto Rico	Culebra	Vieques	Mona	Other
Caretta caretta caretta	Loggerhead sea turtle	X				
Chelonia mydas mydas	Green sea turtle	X	X	X	X	X ^{[5]}
Eretmochelys imbricata imbricata	Hawksbill sea turtle		X	X	X	X ^{[11]}
Lepidochelys olivacea	Olive ridley sea turtle	X				

=== Family Testudinidae ===
Species	Common name	Puerto Rico	Culebra	Vieques	Mona	Other
Geochelone monensis ^{[ext]}					X	
Geochelone denticulata ^{[ext]}	South American yellow-footed tortoise	X				

=== Infraorder Gekkota ===
Species	Common name	Puerto Rico	Culebra	Vieques	Mona	Other
Hemidactylus mabouia ^{[i]}	Tropical house gecko	X	X	X	X	
Phyllodactylus wirshingi ^{[e]}	Puerto Rican leaf-toed gecko	X				X ^{[5]}
Sphaerodactylus nicholsi ^{[e]}	Nichols' dwarf gecko	X				X ^{[9]}
Sphaerodactylus townsendi ^{[e]}	Townsend's dwarf gecko	X		X		X ^{[5]}
Sphaerodactylus roosevelti ^{[e]}	Roosevelt's dwarf gecko	X				X ^{[5]}^{[9]}
Sphaerodactylus gaigeae ^{[e]}	Gaige's dwarf gecko	X		X		X ^{[7]}
Sphaerodactylus klauberi ^{[e]}	Puerto Rico upland dwarf gecko	X				
Sphaerodactylus monensis ^{[e]}	Mona dwarf gecko				X	
Sphaerodactylus levinsi ^{[e]}	Desecheo dwarf gecko					X ^{[8]}
Sphaerodactylus grandisquamis	Big-scaled dwarf gecko	X				
Sphaerodactylus inigoi ^{[e]}	Vieques dwarf gecko		X	X		
Sphaerodactylus macrolepis ^{[e]}	Big-scaled dwarf gecko		X			X ^{[11]}
Sphaerodactylus micropithecus ^{[e]}	Monito dwarf gecko					X ^{[10]}

=== Family Teiidae ===
Species	Common name	Puerto Rico	Culebra	Vieques	Mona	Other
Pholidoscelis exsul	Greater Puerto Rican ameiva	X	X	X		X ^{[5]}^{[7]}
Pholidoscelis wetmorei ^{[e]}	Blue-tailed ground lizard	X				X ^{[5]}^{[9]}
Pholidoscelis alboguttatus	Mona ameiva				X	
Pholidoscelis desechensis	Desecheo ameiva					X ^{[8]}

=== Family Scincidae ===
Species	Common name	Puerto Rico	Culebra	Vieques	Mona	Other
Spondylurus nitidus	Puerto Rican skink	X	X			X
Spondylurus culebrae	Culebra skink		X			X
Spondylurus monae	Mona skink				X	
Spondylurus monitae	Monito skink					X

=== Family Anguinidae ===
Species	Common name	Puerto Rico	Culebra	Vieques	Mona	Other
Diploglossus pleii	Puerto Rican galliwasp	X				

=== Family Iguanidae ===
Species	Common name	Puerto Rico	Culebra	Vieques	Mona	Other
Anolis cuvieri ^{[e]}	Puerto Rican giant anole	X		X		
Anolis roosevelti ^{[e]} ^{[ext]}	Culebra Island giant anole		X			
Anolis occultus ^{[e]}	Puerto Rican twig anole	X				
Anolis evermanni ^{[e]}	Emerald anole	X				
Anolis stratulus	Barred anole	X	X	X		X ^{[7]}
Anolis gundlachi ^{[e]}	Yellow-chinned anole	X				
Anolis cristatellus	Crested anole	X	X	X		X ^{[6]}^{[7]}^{[9]}
Anolis desechensis ^{[e]}	Desecheo anole					X ^{[8]}
Anolis cooki ^{[e]}	Cook's anole	X				X ^{[5]}
Anolis monensis ^{[e]}	Mona anole				X	X ^{[10]}
Anolis pulchellus	Puerto Rican anole	X	X	X		X ^{[7]}^{[6]}
Anolis krugi ^{[e]}	Upland grass anole	X				
Anolis poncensis ^{[e]}	Dryland grass anole	X				
Cyclura pinguis ^{[ex]}	Anegada ground iguana	X				
Cyclura portoricensis ^{[ext]}	Puerto Rican iguana	X				
Cyclura nubila nubila ^{[i]}	Cuban ground iguana	X				
Cyclura cornuta stejnegeri ^{[e]}	Mona ground iguana				X	
Iguana iguana ^{[i]}	Green iguana	X	X			X
Iguana delicatissima	Lesser Antillean iguana	X				

=== Family Amphisbaenidae ===
Species	Common name	Puerto Rico	Culebra	Vieques	Mona	Other
Amphisbaena bakeri ^{[e]}	Baker's worm lizard	X				
Amphisbaena caeca ^{[e]}	Puerto Rican worm lizard	X				
Amphisbaena schmidti ^{[e]}	Schmidt's worm lizard	X				
Amphisbaena xera ^{[e]}	Puerto Rican dryland worm lizard	X				X ^{[5]}

=== Family Typhlopidae ===
Species	Common name	Puerto Rico	Culebra	Vieques	Mona	Other
Typhlops platycephalus	Flat-headed blindsnake	X		X		
Typhlops richardi	Richard's blind snake	X	X			
Typhlops rostellatus ^{[e]}	Puerto Rican wetland blind snake	X				
Typholps granti	Grant's blind snake	X				
Typhlops monensis ^{[e]}	Mona blind snake				X	
Typhlops hypomethes	Coastal blindsnake	X				

=== Family Boidae ===
Species	Common name	Puerto Rico	Culebra	Vieques	Mona	Other
Chilabothrus inornatus ^{[e]}	Puerto Rican boa	X				
Chilabothrus monensis ^{[e]}	Mona Island boa				X	
Chilabothrus granti ^{[e]}	Virgin Island tree boa		X			X

=== Family Colubridae ===
Species	Common name	Puerto Rico	Culebra	Vieques	Mona	Other
Borikenophis portoricensis ^{[e]}	Puerto Rican racer	X	X	X	X	X ^{[7]}
Magliophis exiguus	Puerto Rican garden snake	X	X			X ^{[7]}

== See also ==
- Fauna of Puerto Rico
- List of endemic fauna of Puerto Rico
- List of endemic flora of Puerto Rico
- List of mammals of Puerto Rico
- List of birds of Puerto Rico
- List of amphibians of Puerto Rico

== Footnotes ==
1. ^{endemic} This species is endemic to the archipelago of Puerto Rico.
2. ^{extinct} This species is extinct.
3. ^{extirpated} This species no longer occurs in the archipelago Puerto Rico but other populations exist elsewhere.
4. ^{introduced} This species was introduced to the archipelago of Puerto Rico.
5. ^{Caja de Muertos} This species occurs in Caja de Muertos Island.
6. ^{Cayo Batata} This species occurs in Cayo Batata.
7. ^{Cayo Santiago} This species occurs in Cayo Santiago.
8. ^{Desecheo} This species occurs in the island of Desecheo.
9. ^{Magueyes} This species occurs in Magueyes island.
10. ^{Monito} This species occurs in the island of Monito.
11. ^{Culebrita} This species occurs in the island of Culebrita.
