= List of endemic fauna of Puerto Rico =

This is a list of the endemic fauna of Puerto Rico. This list is sorted in alphabetical order by the scientific name of the species.

== Birds ==
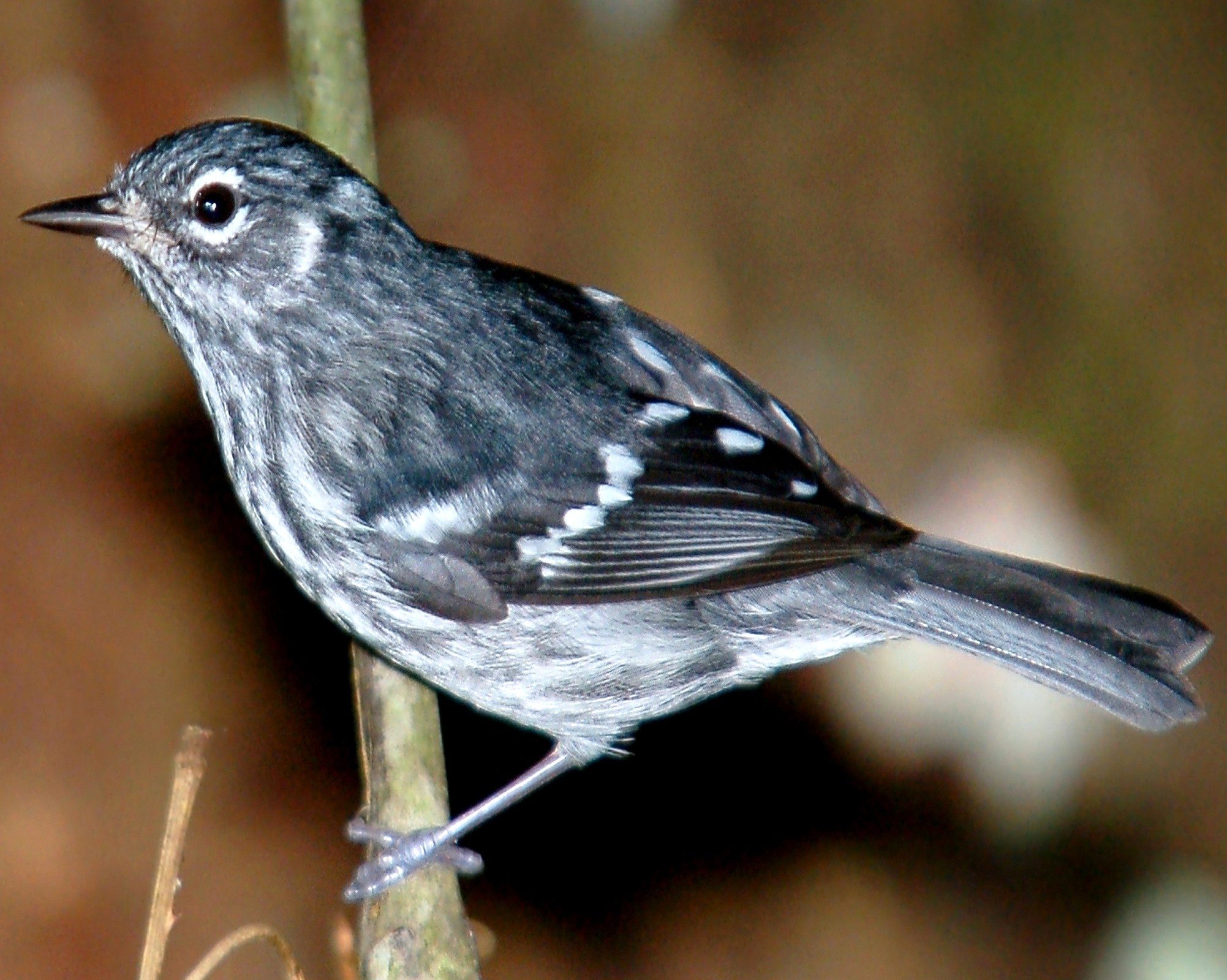
Elfin-woods warbler

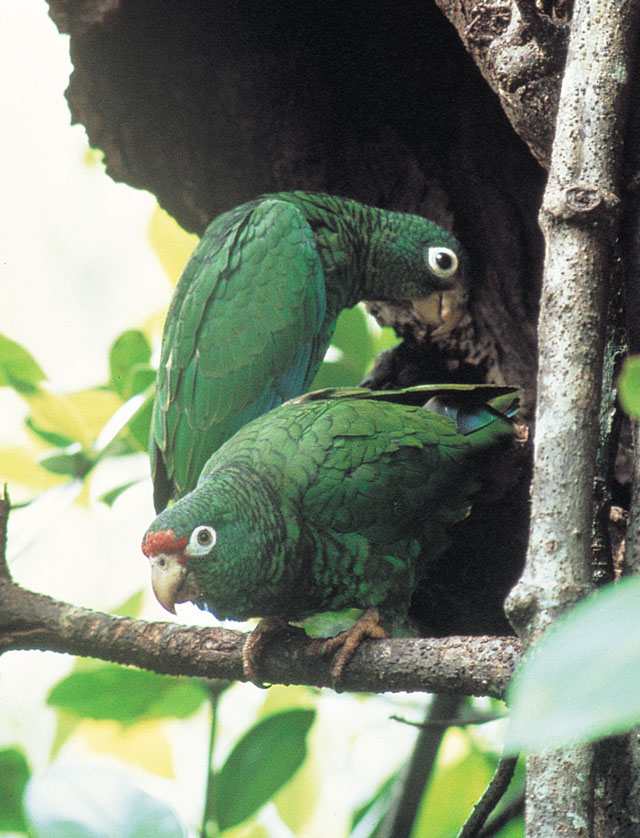
Puerto Rican parrot

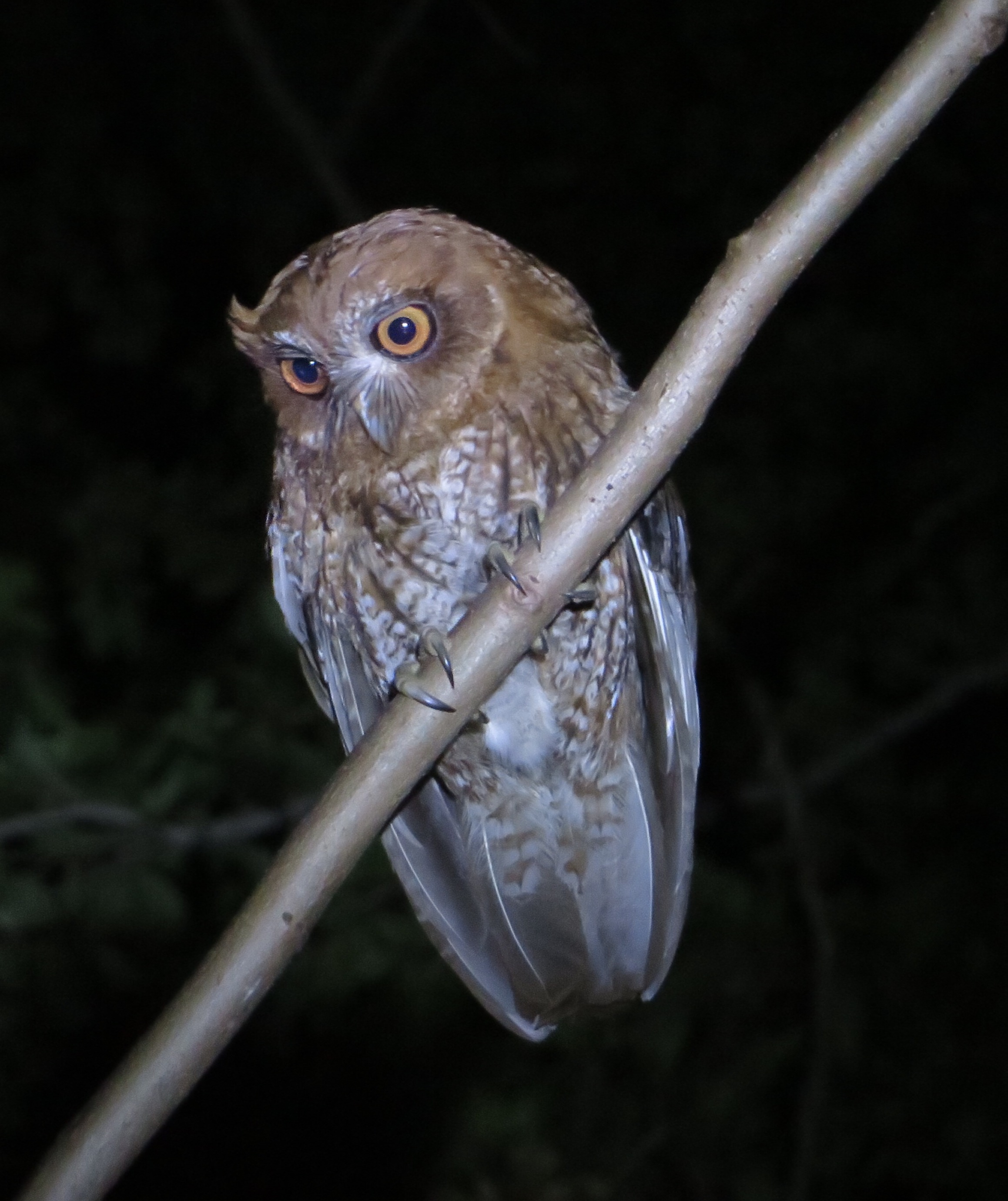
Puerto Rican owl, an endemic species found in the western municipality of Aguada.

- Yellow-shouldered blackbird (Agelaius xanthomus)
- Puerto Rican parrot (Amazona vittata)
- Green mango (Anthracothorax viridis)
- Puerto Rican nightjar (Caprimulgus noctitherus)
- Puerto Rican emerald (Chlorostilbon maugeaus)
- Puerto Rican lizard‑cuckoo (Coccyzus vieilloti)
- Puerto Rican pewee (Contopus portoricenis)
- Adelaide's warbler (Dendroica adelaidae)
- Elfin-woods warbler (Dendroica angelae)
- Puerto Rican oriole (Icterus portoricensis)
- Puerto Rican bullfinch (Loxigilla portoricensis)
- Puerto Rican owl (Gymnasio nudipes)
- Puerto Rican woodpecker (Melanerpes portoricensis)
- Puerto Rican flycatcher (Myiarchus antillarum)
- Puerto Rican tanager (Nesospingus speculiferus)
- Puerto Rican spindalis (Spindalis portoricensis)
- Puerto Rican tody (Todus mexicanus)
- Puerto Rican vireo (Vireo latimeri)
- Puerto Rican euphonia (Chlorophonia sclateri)

== Crustaceans ==
- Buruquena (Epilobocera sinuatifrons)
- Puerto Rican sand crab (Emerita portoricensis)

== Insects ==
- Camponotus kaura- was first described by Roy R. Snelling & Juan A. Torres
- Solenopsis torrei- was first described by Juan A. Torres
- Puerto Rican cave cockroach (Aspiduchus cavernicola)

== Myriapoda ==
- Cylindromus uniporus
- Anadenobolus arboreus
- Rhinocricus parcus

== Reptiles/amphibians ==
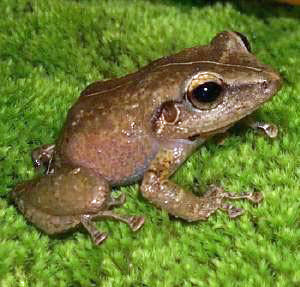
Coquí

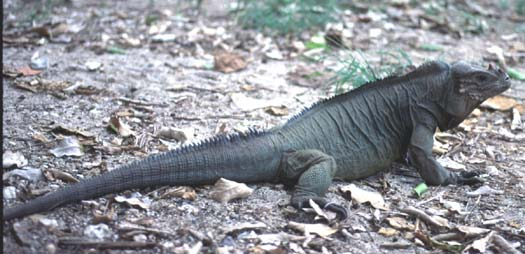
Mona ground iguana

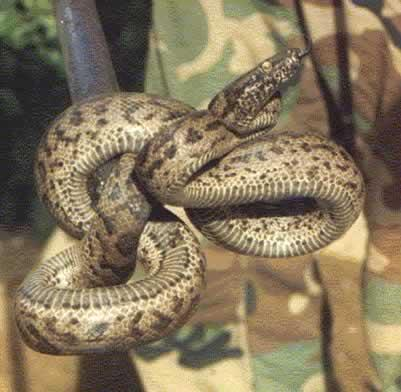
Puerto Rican boa

- Puerto Rican racer (Borikenophis portoricensis)
- Mona ameiva (Ameiva alboguttata)
- Desecheo ameiva (Ameiva desechensis)
- Puerto Rican ground lizard (Ameiva exsul)
- Blue-tailed ground lizard (Ameiva wetmorei)
- Baker's worm lizard (Amphisbaena bakeri)
- Puerto Rican worm lizard (Amphisbaena caeca)
- Schmidt's worm lizard (Amphisbaena schmiditi)
- Puerto Rican dryland worm lizard, North American worm lizard (Amphisbaena xera)
- Guánica pallid anole, Cook's pallid anole, Cook's anole (Anolis cooki)
- Puerto Rican giant anole (Anolis cuvieri)
- Mona anole (Anolis monensis)
- Dwarf anole, pygmy anole, Puerto Rican twig anole (Anolis occultus)
- Ponce anole (Anolis poncensis), which is the same as the Dryland grass anole (Ctenonotus poncensis)
- Puerto Rican garden snake (Magliophis exiguus subspadix)
- Puerto Rican crested toad, ridge-headed toad, lowland Caribbean toad, Puerto Rican toad and sapo concho (Bufo lemur)
- Mona ground iguana (Cyclura cornuta stejnegeri)
- Puerto Rican galliwasp (Diploglossus pleei)
- Puerto Rican cave dwelling frog (Eleutherodactylus cooki)
- Common coquí (Eleutherodactylus coqui)
- Mottled coquí (Eleutherodactylus eneidae)
- Golden coquí (Eleutherodactylus jasperi)
- Mona coquí (Eleutherodactylus monensis)
- Melodius coquí (Eleutherodactylus wightmanae)
- Puerto Rican boa (Chilabothrus inornatus)
- Mona Island boa (Chilabothrus monensis)
- Monito gecko (Sphaerodactylus micropithecus)
- Mona dwarf gecko (Sphaerodactylus monensis)
- Puerto Rico upland gecko (Sphaerodactylus klauberi)
- Desecheo dwarf gecko (Sphaerodactylus levinsi)
- Gaige's least gecko (Sphaerodactylus gaigeae)
- Townsend's dwarf gecko (Sphaerodactylus townsendi)
- Nichols' dwarf gecko (Sphaerodactylus nicholsi)
- Puerto Rican dwarf gecko (Sphaerodactylus grandisquamis)
- Isla Vieques dwarf gecko (Sphaerodactylus inigoi)
- Roosevelt's dwarf gecko (Sphaerodactylus roosevelti)
- Mona blindsnake (Typhlops monensis)
- Puerto Rican wetland blind snake (Typhlops rostellatus)

== Spiders ==
This is a list of all spiders endemic to Puerto Rico, according to Platnick.

- Anyphaenidae

- Anyphaena decora
- Wulfila coamoanus
- Wulfila inconspicuus
- Wulfila isolatus
- Wulfila macropalpus
- Wulfila tropicus

- Araneidae

- Araneus adjuntaensis
- Lewisepeira maricao
- Metazygia silvestris

- Clubionidae

- Clubiona desecheonis
- Elaver portoricensis

- Corinnidae

- Abapeba guanicae
- Abapeba wheeleri
- Corinna javuyae
- Phrurolithus insularis
- Phrurolithus portoricensis
- Trachelas borinquensis

- Ctenidae

- Celaetycheus modestus
- Celaetycheus strenuus
- Oligoctenus ottleyi
- Trujillina isolata

- Dipluridae

- Masteria petrunkevitchi

- Gnaphosidae

- Camillina desecheonis
- Neozimiris nuda

- Hahniidae

- Hahnia naguaboi

- Ixodidae (ticks)

- Amblyomma arianae

- Linyphiidae

- Lepthyphantes microserratus

- Lycosidae

- Agalenocosa yaucensis

- Mimetidae

- Mimetus portoricensis

- Oonopidae

- Oonops delegenus
- Oonops ebenecus
- Oonops viridans
- Stenoonops econotus
- Stenoonops phonetus
- Stenoonops portoricensis

- Pholcidae

- Modisimus cavaticus
- Modisimus coeruleolineatus
- Modisimus montanus
- Modisimus montanus dentatus
- Modisimus sexoculatus
- Modisimus signatus

- Salticidae

- Agobardus blandus
- Corythalia gloriae
- Corythalia tristriata
- Emathis luteopunctata
- Emathis minuta
- Emathis portoricensis
- Emathis tetuani
- Eris illustris
- Habronattus ensenadae
- Habronattus facetus
- Hentzia squamata
- Jollas minutus
- Neonella mayaguez
- Sidusa mona
- Siloca monae

- Scytodidae

- Scytodes dissimulans

- Sparassidae

- Olios bicolor
- Olios darlingtoni
- Pseudosparianthis jayuyae
- Stasina portoricensis

- Tetragnathidae

- Chrysometa hamata
- Chrysometa jayuyensis
- Chrysometa yunque
- Glenognatha gloriae
- Tetragnatha bryantae

- Theraphosidae

- Avicularia laeta
- Cyrtopholis culebrae
- Cyrtopholis portoricae
- Holothele culebrae

- Theridiidae

- Dipoena puertoricensis
- Styposis lutea
- Theridion ricense

- Theridiosomatidae

- Baalzebub albonotatus
- Ogulnius gloriae

- Thomisidae

- Misumenops bubulcus
- Rejanellus mutchleri
- Tmarus vertumus

- Uloboridae

- Miagrammopes animotus

== Extinct animals ==
- Greater Puerto Rican ground sloth (Acratocnus major) - The greater Puerto Rican ground sloth became extinct approximately 3000–4000 years ago.
- Lesser Puerto Rican ground sloth (Acratocnus odontrigonus) - The lesser Puerto Rican ground sloth became extinct approximately 3000–4000 years ago.
- Puerto Rican caracara (Caracara latebrosus)
- Puerto Rican plate-tooth (Elasmodontomys obliquus) - The Puerto Rican plate-tooth, giant hutia or Puerto Rican paca became extinct approximately in the early 16th century.
- Greater Puerto Rican agouti (Heteropsomys antillensis)
- Lesser Puerto Rican agouti (Heteropsomys insulans)
- Puerto Rican nesophontes (Nesophontes edithae) - The Puerto Rican nesophontes became extinct approximately in the early 16th century.
- Corozal rat (Puertoricomys corozalus)
- Puerto Rican parakeet, Mauge's parakeet (Psittacara chloroptera maugei syn. Psittacara maugei)
- Puerto Rican barn owl (Tyto cavatica)

== See also ==
- List of amphibians and reptiles of Puerto Rico
- List of endemic flora of Puerto Rico
- List of Puerto Rican birds
- San Juan Botanical Garden
