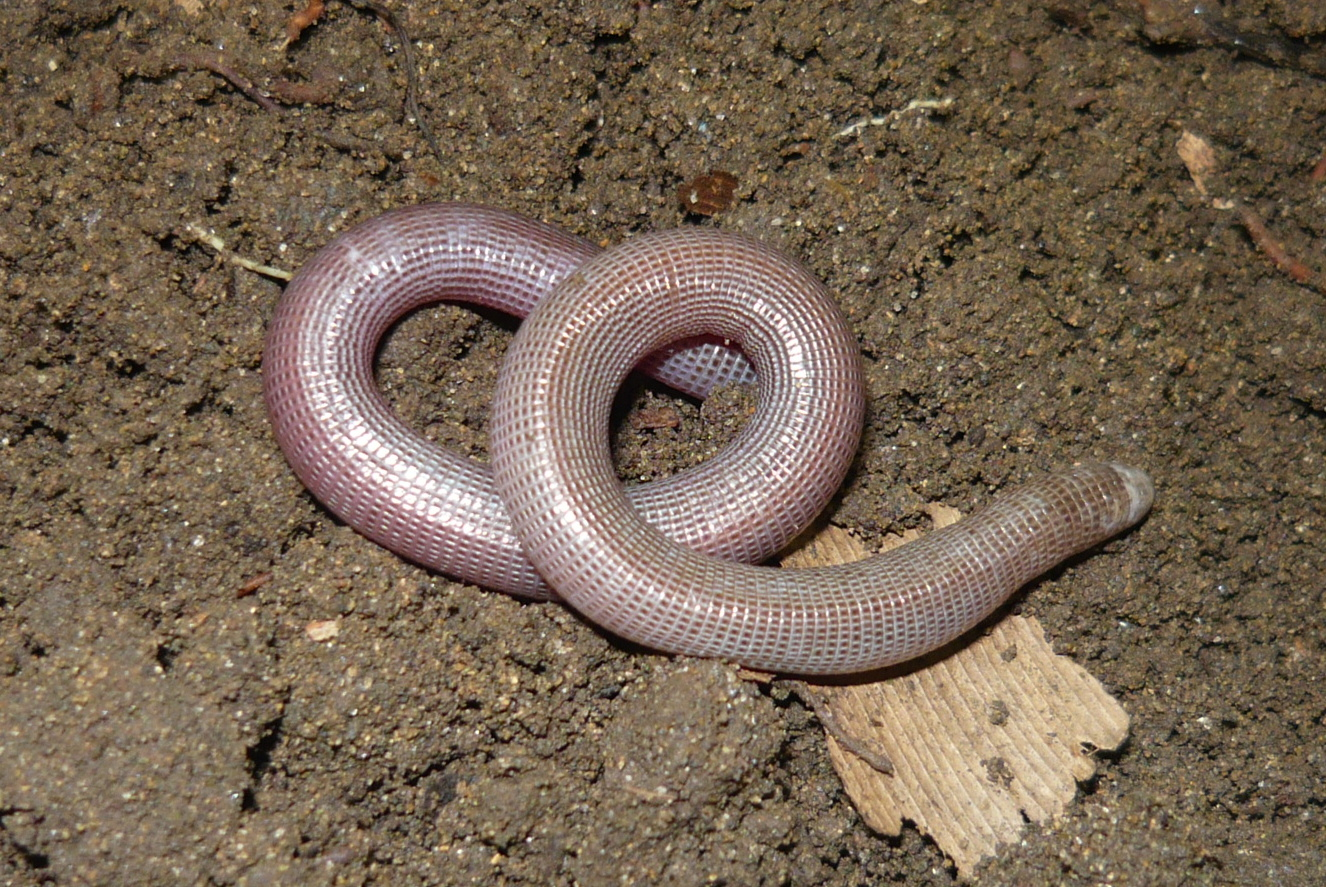
- from Puerto Rico
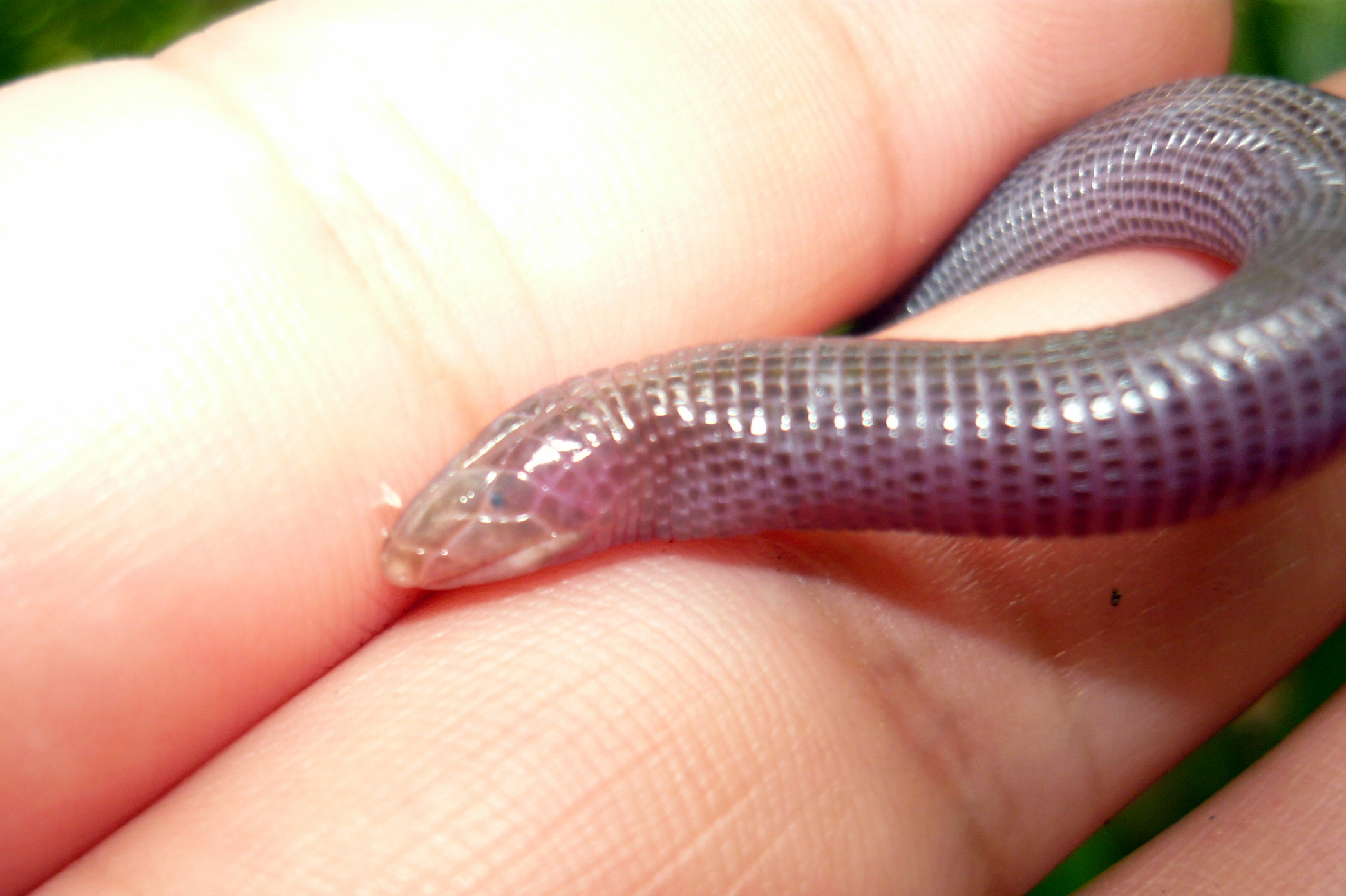
- biting researcher's hand. They are strong enough to rip off tiny pieces of skin.

Conservation status
- Least Concern (IUCN 3.1)

Scientific classification
- Kingdom: Animalia
- Phylum: Chordata
- Class: Reptilia
- Order: Squamata
- Clade: Amphisbaenia
- Family: Amphisbaenidae
- Genus: Amphisbaena
- Species: A. caeca

Binomial name
- Amphisbaena caeca Cuvier, 1829

= Amphisbaena caeca =

Species of reptile

Amphisbaena caeca, commonly known as the Puerto Rican worm lizard or blind worm lizard, is a species of worm lizard endemic to Puerto Rico. These animals are vermicular reptiles that live under logs, rocks, and dirt. Other species of Amphisbaenids in the Caribbean include Amphisbaena bakeri, Amphisbaena fenestrata, Amphisbaena schmidti, Amphisbaena xera, and Cadea blanoides.

Amphisbaenids are legless, worm-like reptiles with elongated bodies nearly uniform in diameter. They are covered with ring-like scales similar in appearance to earthworms. They are underground animals, hence the eyes have degenerated to tiny indistinct spots under the rings.

== Description ==
Amphisbaena caeca is pinkish-brown on the head and tail, with dark spots on each of the scales found throughout its annuli (body rings), of which there are between 214 and 237 in this species. This helps distinguish it from A. bakeri, whose annuli count is greater. It is one of the two largest amphisbaenids on the island (the other being A. bakeri), measuring up to 10 inches (250 millimeters) in snout to vent length (SVL). Like other members of its clade, it has only one median tooth. Because it is somewhat difficult to distinguish its head from its tail, it is sometimes referred to as a "two-headed snake" ("culebra de dos cabezas") by Puerto Rican locals. According to folklore, wearing a live Amphisbaena on the body "helps safeguard pregnancy" while wearing a dead snake "helps rheumatism".

== Habits ==
They can be found burrowing in the ground under logs, rocks, old tree stumps, and under termite and ant nests.

== Habitat ==
They live in dense woodlands, thickets, and caves.

== Geographic range ==
The distribution of this species is the widest of any amphisbaenid in Puerto Rico, being found throughout the central mountainous region of the island up to an elevation of 2,200 feet (670 meters). They have also been found in Isla Vieques, Isla Culebra, and the Virgin Islands.

== See also ==
- List of amphibians and reptiles of Puerto Rico
- List of endemic fauna of Puerto Rico
