= Anolis roosevelti =

Culebra Island giant anole

Conservation status
- Critically endangered, possibly extinct (IUCN 3.1)

Scientific classification
- Kingdom: Animalia
- Phylum: Chordata
- Class: Reptilia
- Order: Squamata
- Suborder: Iguania
- Family: Dactyloidae
- Genus: Anolis
- Species: A. roosevelti

Binomial name
- Anolis roosevelti Grant, 1931

Synonyms
- Xiphosurus roosevelti — Nicholson et al., 2012

Rare or extinct species of reptile

Anolis roosevelti, also known commonly as the Virgin Islands giant anole, Roosevelt's giant anole or the Culebra giant anole, is an extremely rare or possibly extinct species of lizard of the genus Anolis in the family Dactyloidae. The species is native to the Virgin Islands and Vieques.

== Taxonomy and etymology ==
The Culebra Island giant anole was first described in 1931 by American zoologist Chapman Grant, grandson of U.S. President Grant. It is named in honor of Theodore Roosevelt Jr., who was the governor of Puerto Rico at that time. It was initially described as Anolis roosevelti, but some have suggested it should be transferred into the genus Xiphosurus in 2012. This new classification system is controversial and many have preferred to maintain all anoles in genus Anolis.

== Geographic range ==
Anolis roosevelti is endemic to Culebra Island in Puerto Rico, and the Virgin Islands.

== Habitat ==
A. roosevelti lives in forested zones on the slopes of Mt. Resaca.

== Description ==
A. roosevelti can reach a snout-to-vent length (SVL) of 160 mm (6.3 in). The color of the body is brown-grey, while the tail has a yellow-brown hue and the abdomen is whitish. The throat fan varies from gray on the upperparts to yellow on the underparts, and the eyelids are yellow. A further feature are two long drawn-out lines on both sides of the body; one starts at the ear, the other at the shoulder.

== Reproduction ==
A. roosevelti is oviparous.

== Threats ==
Though A. roosevelti was only observed again in 1932 after its discovery, there have been unconfirmed sightings since 1973 (the last one in 1978). Some experts believe that it might still exist. It preferred a habitat with gumbo-limbo and ficus trees because it fed from the fruits of the trees. Due to human activities the habitat was almost destroyed; only a few specimens of the Culebra Giant Anole can be seen in museums. It was listed as federally endangered in the Endangered Species Act in 1977.

== See also ==
- Fauna of Puerto Rico
- List of endemic fauna of Puerto Rico
- List of reptiles of Puerto Rico
