= Chapman Grant =

American zoologist, historian and publisher (1887-1983)

- Born: March 27, 1887; Salem Center, New York, U.S.
- Died: January 5, 1983 (aged 95); Escondido, California, U.S.
- Education: Williams College
- Known for: Description of new taxa
- Spouse: Mabel Glenn Ward
- Father: Jesse Root Grant II
- Relatives: President Ulysses S. Grant (grandfather)
- Scientific career
- Fields: Herpetology, history
- Workplaces: Brooklyn Institute of Arts and Sciences, San Diego Natural History Museum, University of Wichita
- Author abbrev. (zoology): Grant

Chapman Grant (March 27, 1887 – January 5, 1983) was an American herpetologist, historian, and publisher. He was the last living grandson of United States President Ulysses S. Grant.

He was married and had two children, one of whom survived him, his only son Ulysses S. Grant V.

== Biography ==
Chapman Grant was born in Salem Center, New York, the son of Jesse Root Grant II, the youngest son of the 18th President of the United States Ulysses S. Grant. In 1892 he moved to San Diego with his parents. As a child, he spent time at the California Academy of Sciences, where he developed his interest in science. He graduated from Williams College in 1910. He became the assistant curator of entomology at the Children's Museum of the Brooklyn Institute of Arts and Sciences in September 1913. In November 1913, he left the museum for a military career beginning on the Mexican border. He was commissioned a 2nd Lieutenant in the 14th U.S. Cavalry. He married Mabel Glenn Ward in 1917. He continued his scientific studies while in the Army. When he was assigned as commandant of the Reserve Officers' Training Corps at the University of Wichita in the 1930s, he wrote scientific papers on herpetology and was curator at the Arkansas Valley Museum and Historical Society. He retired with a rank of major.

In the 1930s and 1950s several expeditions for the San Diego Natural History Museum and the Illinois Museum of Natural History led him to the study of the Caribbean herpetofauna where he described fifteen new taxa, including the blue iguana, the cotton ginner gecko, Gaige's dwarf gecko, Klauber's dwarf gecko, Nichols' dwarf gecko, Roosevelt's dwarf gecko, Townsend's dwarf gecko, Cook's anole, the Culebra Island giant anole, Cochran's croaking gecko, the web-footed coqui, Cook's robber frog, and the whistling coqui.

Two West Indian snakes are named in his honor: Chilabothrus granti and Typhlops granti.

In 1932 he established the scientific publication Herpetologica, the quarterly journal of the Herpetologists' League, an association of several notable herpetologists in the US, which he co-founded in 1936. He was also the publisher of a second magazine - Scientists Forum.

In 1982 the Major Chapman Grant Hall of Ecology in the San Diego Natural History Museum in Balboa Park was named in honor of him. In 1983 he died at the age of 95 in a nursing home at Escondido, California. He left one son, Ulysses S. Grant V (September 21, 1920 – March 7, 2011).

== Works ==
- (1935). "Secondary sexual differences and notes on the mud turtle Kinosternon subrubrum in northern Indiana". American Midland Naturalist 16 (5): 798–800.
- (1935). "Natrix sipedon sipedon in central Indiana, its individual and sexual variation". American Midland Naturalist 16 (6): 921–931.
- (1937). "Herpetological notes from central Kansas". American Midland Naturalist 18 (3): 370–372.
- (1940). (with W. Gardner Lynn). "The Herpetology of Jamaica". Bull. Inst. Jamaica Sci., Series 1: 1–148.
- (1960). "Differentiation of the two southwestern tortoises (genus Gopherus), with notes on their habits". Trans. San Diego Nat. Hist. Soc. 12 (27): 441–448.

== See also ==
- Tanager Expedition
