= Herpetologica =

- Discipline: Herpetology
- Language: English
- Edited by: Brian Halstead

Publication details
- History: 1936-present
- Publisher: Kriyadocs on behalf of the Herpetologists' League (United States)
- Impact factor: 1.1 (2025)

Standard abbreviations
- ISO 4: Herpetologica

Indexing
- CODEN: HPTGAP
- ISSN: 0018-0831 (print); 1938-5099 (web)
- LCCN: 41018025
- JSTOR: 00180831
- OCLC no.: 875838938

Links
- Journal homepage; Online access at BioOne

Herpetologica is a peer-reviewed scientific journal published by Kriyadocs on behalf of the Herpetologists' League covering herpetology. It was established in 1936 by Chapman Grant. The editor is Brian Halstead (USGS).

== Abstracting and indexing information ==
The journal is abstracted and indexed in:

- BIOSIS Previews
- Current Contents/Agriculture, Biology & Environmental Sciences
- Science Citation Index
- Scopus
- The Zoological Record

According to the Journal Citation Reports, the journal has a 2025 impact factor of 1.1.
