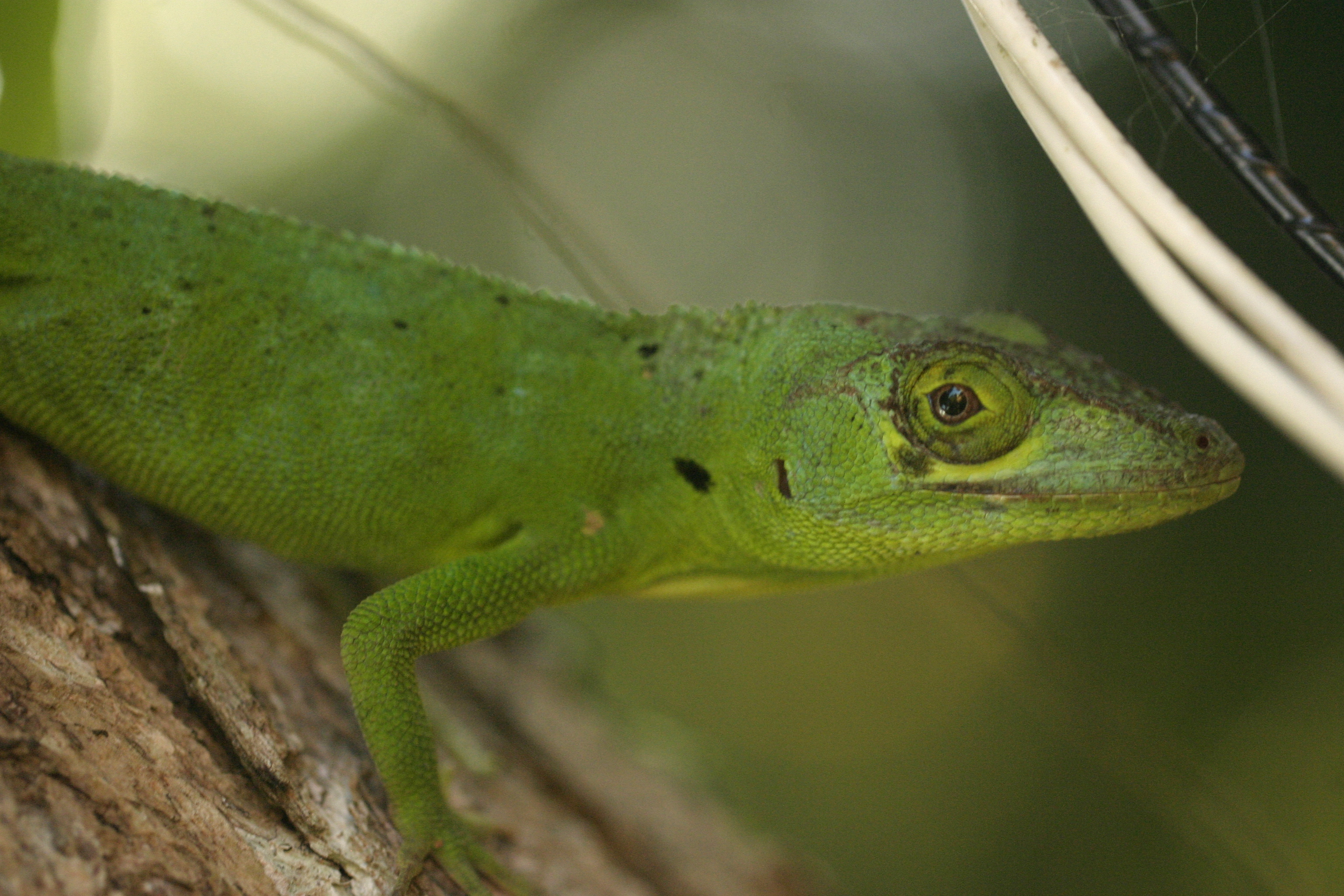

Conservation status
- Least Concern (IUCN 3.1)

Scientific classification
- Kingdom: Animalia
- Phylum: Chordata
- Class: Reptilia
- Order: Squamata
- Suborder: Iguania
- Family: Anolidae
- Genus: Anolis
- Species: A. cuvieri

Binomial name
- Anolis cuvieri Merrem, 1820

Synonyms
- Anolis cuvieri Merrem, 1820; Xiphosurus cuvieri — Fitzinger, 1826; Dactyloa cuvieri — Wagler, 1830; Ctenonotus (Semiurus) cuvieri — Fitzinger, 1843; Anolis cuvieri — Boulenger, 1885; Xiphosurus cuvieri — Nicholson et al., 2012; Ctenonotus cuvieri — Nicholson et al., 2018

= Anolis cuvieri =

Species of reptile

Anolis cuvieri (Vernacular Spanish: lagarto verde, lagarto chipojo; Vernacular English: Puerto Rican giant anole, Cuvier's anole, green giant anole.) is a large, arboreal species of lizard in the family Dactyloidae. The species is endemic to Puerto Rico, and is common in the Toro Negro State Forest. The species is known for its green coloration which it only acquires as an adult. A highly territorial and aggressive species, even capable of eating smaller anoles that it finds to be a threat. The species was once thought to be extinct, but now is relatively common found in forests with little to no human impact.

== Etymology ==
The specific name, cuvieri, is in honor of French naturalist Georges Cuvier.

== Description ==
A. cuvieri is a relatively large (for an anole) lizard with a mean snout–vent length (SVL) of up to 132 mm (5.2 in). It has a large, robust skull and long hind legs, as well as a serrated ridge of raised scales along its back. Like most anoles, this species has large flattened disks under the second and third phalanges of each toe which enable it to adhere to vertical surfaces. This species is predominantly green in body coloration with some individuals displaying faint light green stripes on the sides and dorsal surface.

In some specimens, particularly large adult males, the head is heavily blotched with sky blue coloration which suffuses onto the nape. This coloration may extend onto the neck area or even onto the dorsal surface running the length of the spine. In females where the blue coloration is present it is only as a sky blue tint on the head which does not extend onto the neck.

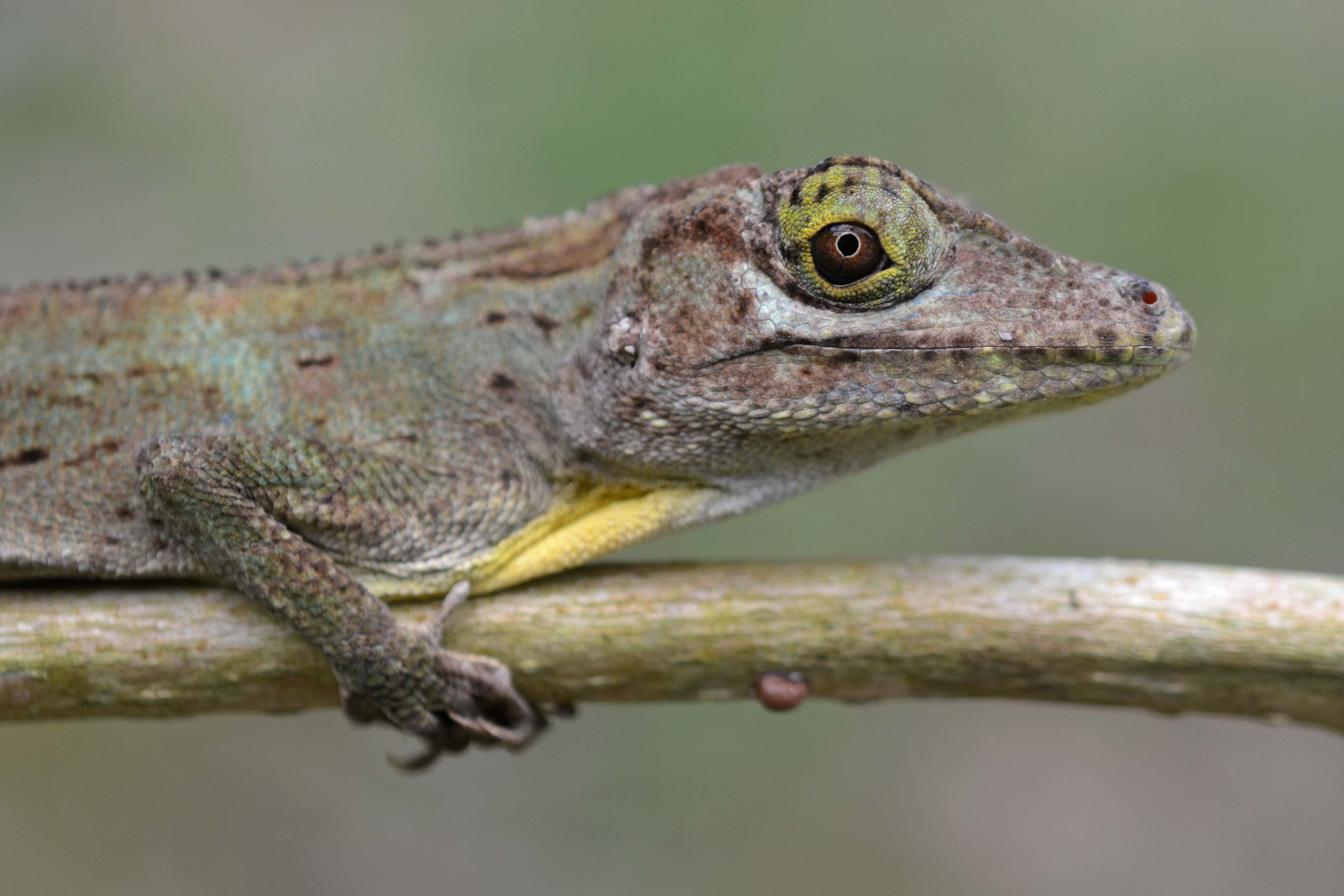
Rare brown morph of A.cuvieri.

In both males and females the orbital area is either bright yellow or vibrant yellow-green. Both male and female Puerto Rican giant anoles possess a large dewlap; however, it is noticeably larger and colored bright yellow in males whereas in females it is light green with a blue green superior portion and faint black stripes running horizontally across the upper two thirds. The coloration of A. cuvieri is ontogenic, with juveniles of both sexes being gray brown or brown in color with brown vertical stripes running along the entire dorsal surface of the body as well as the limbs. Their dewlap begins as a tan color with dark brown markings, eventually transitioning to yellow before they reach full maturity. As they mature, juveniles gradually acquire the green adult coloration. A. Cuvieri is the only known anole to display this color dimorphism that doesn't differ between genders. There also exists a rare brown adult morph of A. cuvieri which is solid brown in body coloration with black spots on the sides and neck and a yellow blotched orbital area. Both sexes possess a large erectile crest on the tail, though it is usually higher in males.

== Habitat ==
A. cuvieri belongs to a group of anoles known as crown giants, these are large species which inhabit the uppermost canopy of tall trees and rarely descend to ground level, made possible by the pads under their toes which allow them to stick to surfaces. A. cuvieri is only found in intact forest regions where large quantities of large trees are present. Juveniles are often found at the base of trees or even on the ground, while adults are typically active several meters above the ground and are found mainly in palm, Ficus, and other large trees. This species locomotes by jumping from branch to branch within the canopy, a lifestyle for which it has evolved long hind limbs. It is a mesic species, preferring areas of wet forest over more xeric conditions, where it is rarely found.

== Diet ==
Like all anoles, A. cuvieri is primarily insectivorous, feeding on arboreal insects such as large beetles and lepidopterans. This species is also an opportunist species, and its robust skull and powerful bite allow it to take a wide range of prey including other anoles and small birds as well as large snails and occasionally fruit.

== Behaviour ==
While hunting for food, A. cuvieri moves deliberately, using both eyes independently to scan for potential threats and for prey. Both sexes of A. cuvieri are extremely territorial and aggressive. Males, however, are particularly aggressive not only towards other males but also towards any organism or object that the anole perceives to be a threat. Males that encounter intruders in their territory will generally perform elaborate bodily displays, extending and recoiling the dewlap and performing various head bobs or pushups. This is usually done well before the intruder manages to get within close proximity of the defender and the display is often successful at warding off the intruder. However, if the intruding male is persistent then a fight may ensue with the males locking jaws and biting at each other's extremities until either male either gives up and flees or dies of exhaustion. Fights may also prove fatal if a serious wound, such as an amputated limb, occurs and subsequently becomes infected. This species attempts to bite when handled and its powerful jaws are capable of breaking skin. It may also display at a potential predator or captor if one is sighted. Like many reptiles the mouth of this species harbors Salmonella and an infection may occur if a bite breaks the skin.

== Predation ==
A. cuvieri is most likely to be preyed on by snakes and birds. It relies on its coloration and natural camouflage in order to avoid being detected.

== Threat and conservation ==
A. cuvieri is currently under threat in Puerto Rico due to the effects of past deforestation and environmental degradation. It is now only found in a select few areas of intact natural forest but its population appears to be stable. During Puerto Rico's period of rampant deforestation in the early twentieth century this species disappeared almost entirely and was not sighted for many years. It was feared extinct until after the agricultural collapse in Puerto Rico (late 1950s) which resulted in an end to deforestation. After this, the species made a remarkable recovery and, though its distribution is still limited, it has become quite common in some of the remaining areas of natural rainforest on the island.

== Gallery ==
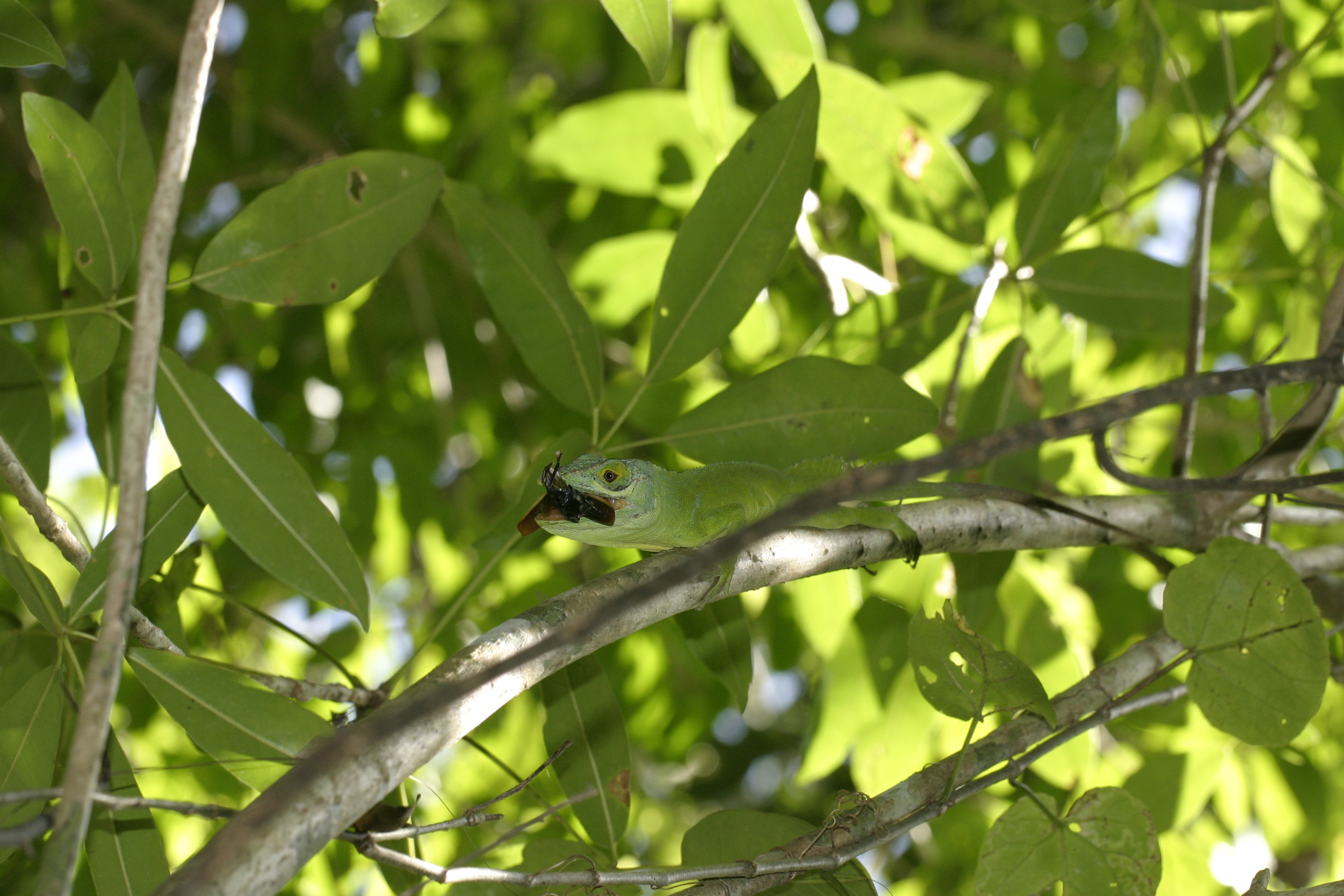
Anolis cuvieri consuming a beetle

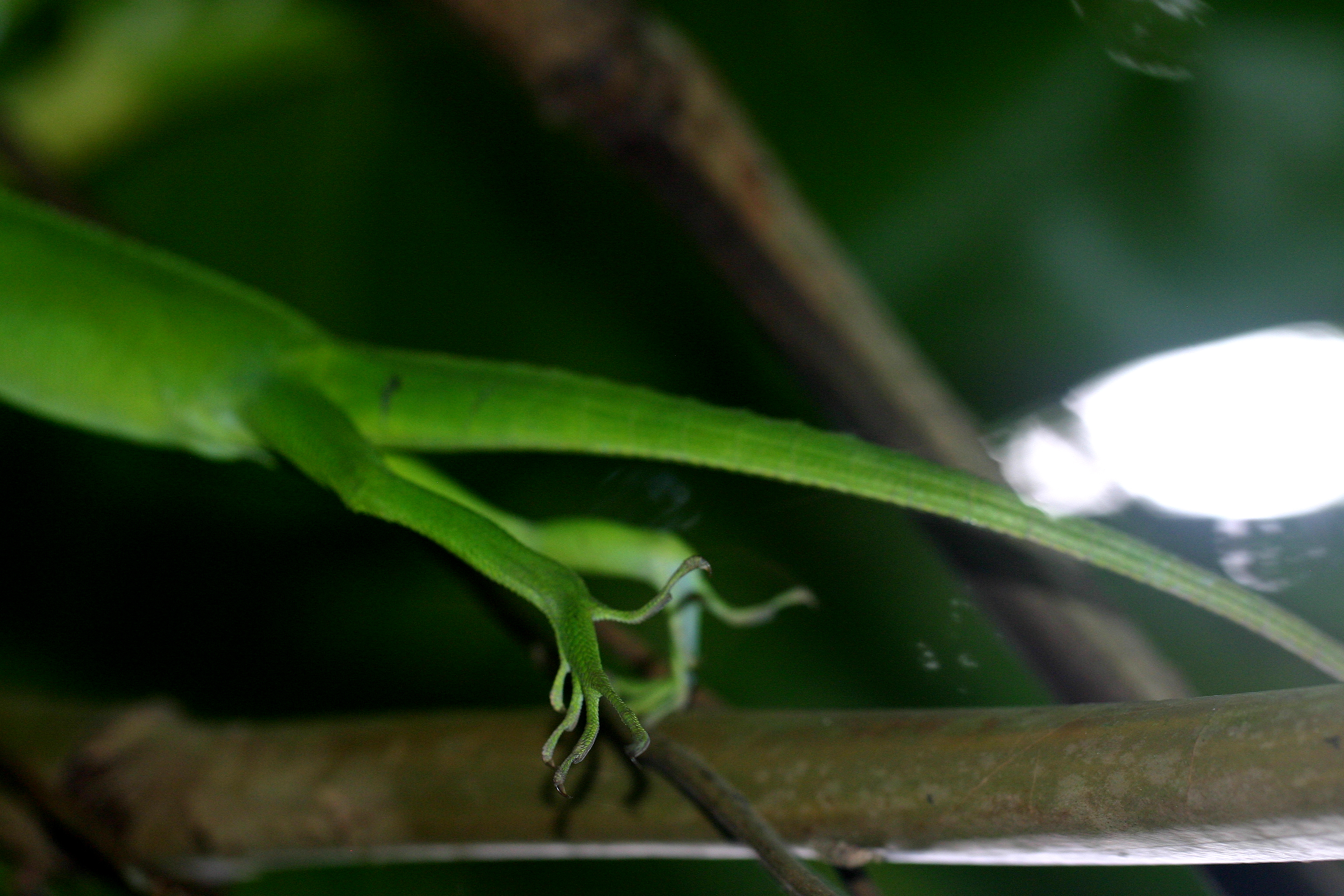
Hind legs of A. cuvieri

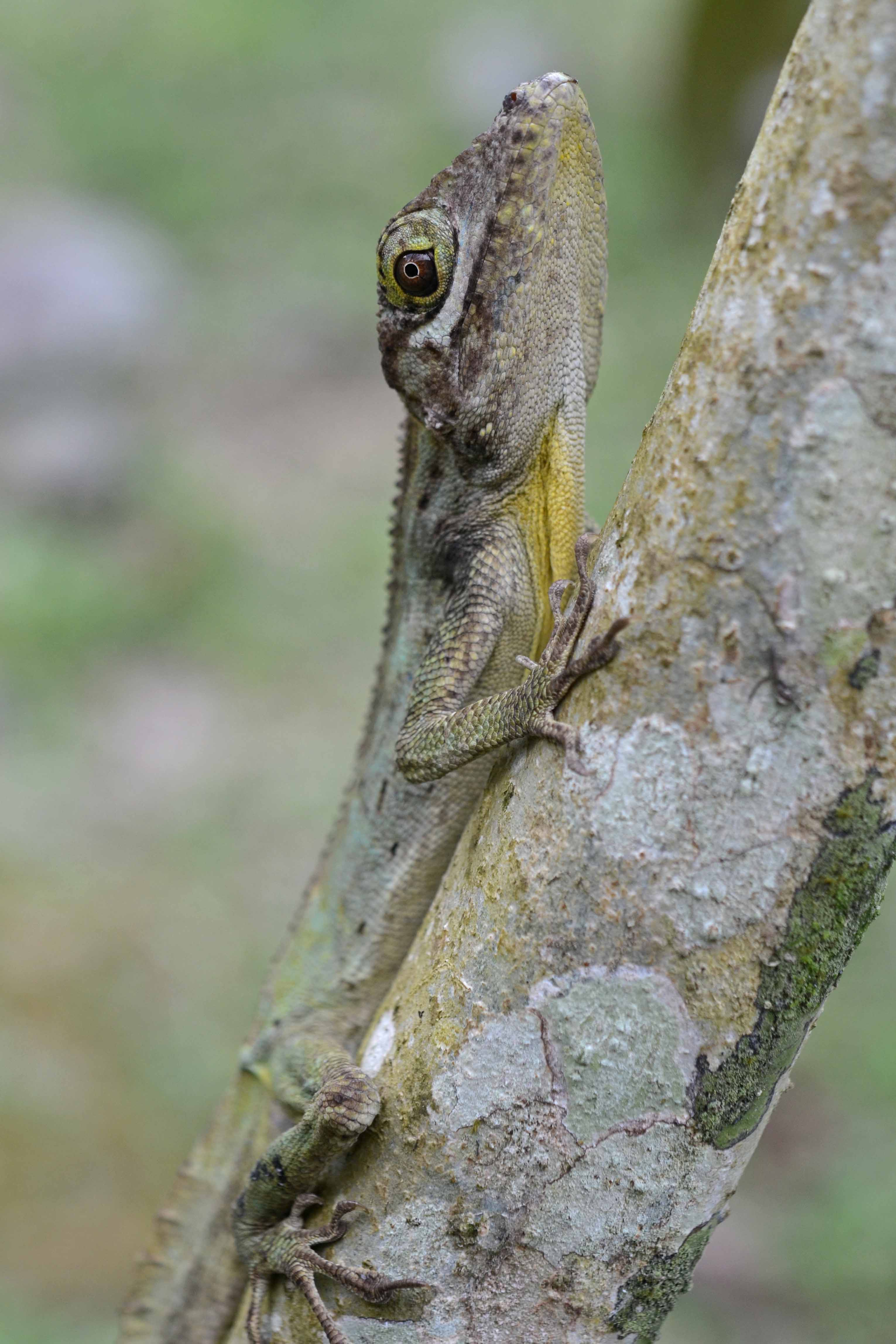
Rare brown morph Puerto Rican giant anole

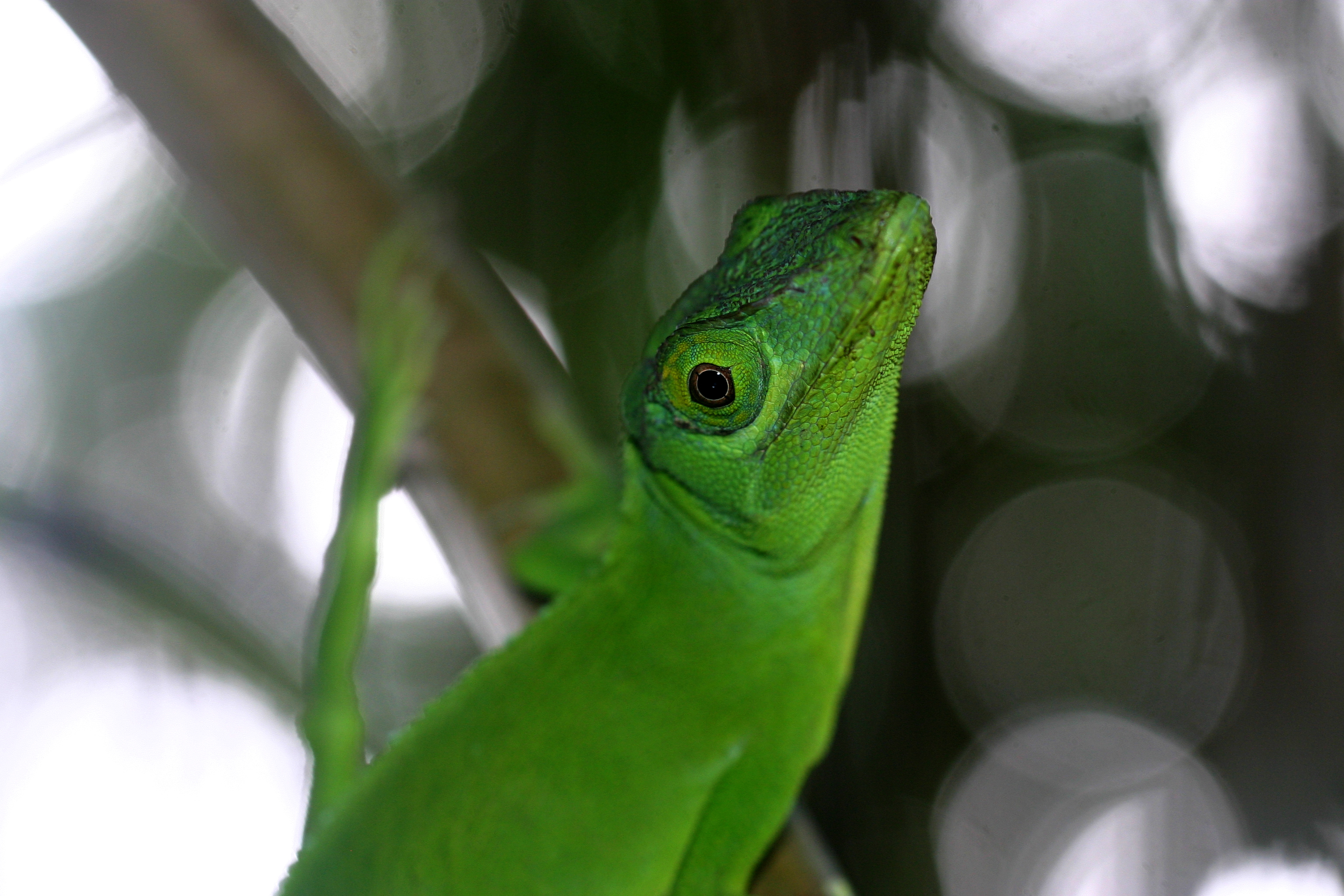
A. cuvieri looking

== See also ==
- List of reptiles of Puerto Rico
- Fauna of Puerto Rico
- List of endemic fauna of Puerto Rico
