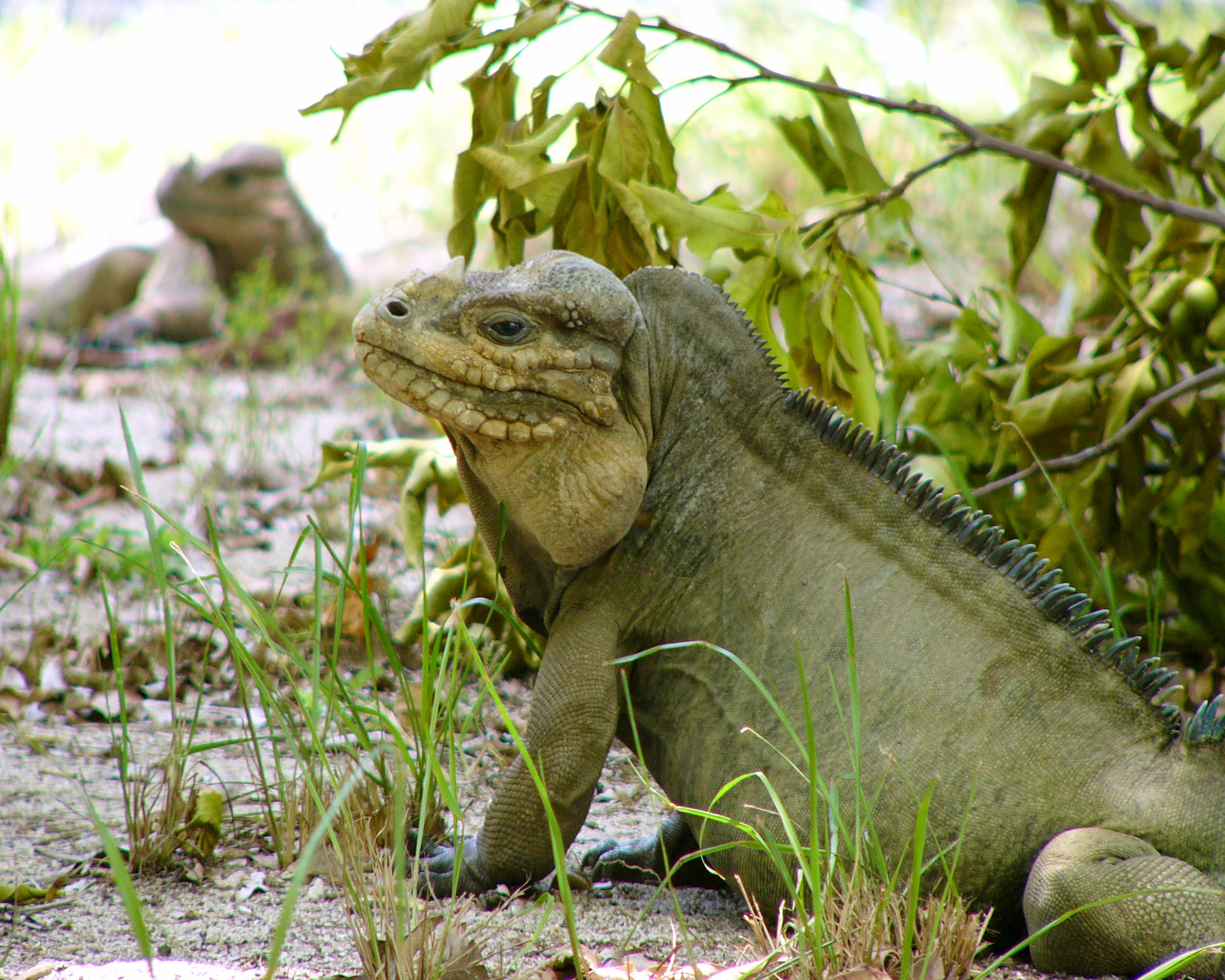

Conservation status
- Critically Endangered (IUCN 3.1)
- CITES Appendix I

Scientific classification
- Kingdom: Animalia
- Phylum: Chordata
- Class: Reptilia
- Order: Squamata
- Suborder: Iguania
- Family: Iguanidae
- Genus: Cyclura
- Species: C. stejnegeri

Binomial name
- Cyclura stejnegeri Barbour & Noble, 1916

Synonyms
- Cyclura cornuta stejnegeri (Barbour & Noble, 1916)

= Mona ground iguana =

Species of Cyclura closely related to the rhinoceros iguana

The Mona ground iguana (Cyclura stejnegeri) is a critically endangered species of rock iguana, endemic to Mona Island, Puerto Rico. It is one of the island's few large land animals, and it is the largest endemic terrestrial lizard in the U.S. territory, as well as one of the biggest rock iguanas within the Antilles. It was previously considered a subspecies of the rhinoceros iguana (Cyclura cornuta).

== Taxonomy ==
The Mona ground iguana belongs to the genus Cyclura. It was named by Thomas Barbour and Gladwyn Kingsley Noble as a species in 1916. In 1937, Barbour considered it to be a subspecies of Cyclura cornuta, although he doubted that it was particularly distinct. Research into scalation patterns in 1977 found little difference between this taxon and the nominate subspecies on Hispaniola, but markedly more differences in the subspecies onchiopsis, and thus found Barbour's 1937 taxonomic interpretation best approximated the obvious relatedness of these taxa. Its specific name, stejnegeri honors Leonhard Hess Stejneger, who, when writing his Herpetology of Porto Rico in 1902, suspected the rhinoceros iguanas of Mona Island might be slightly different in scale count than those in Haiti, although he was unsure.

In 1993, Robert Powell suggested that all three subspecies of the rhinoceros iguana could be seen as distinct species, if the word "species" was redefined to mean any population that was separated from another population. Although it does not appear to be distinct from the nominotypical subspecies morphologically, in a 1999 article, Powell again recommended recognizing this population as a different species, based on what he had said in 1993. Some authorities have decided to follow Powell. Still, others consider it a regional variant of the parent species, C. cornuta.

== Description ==
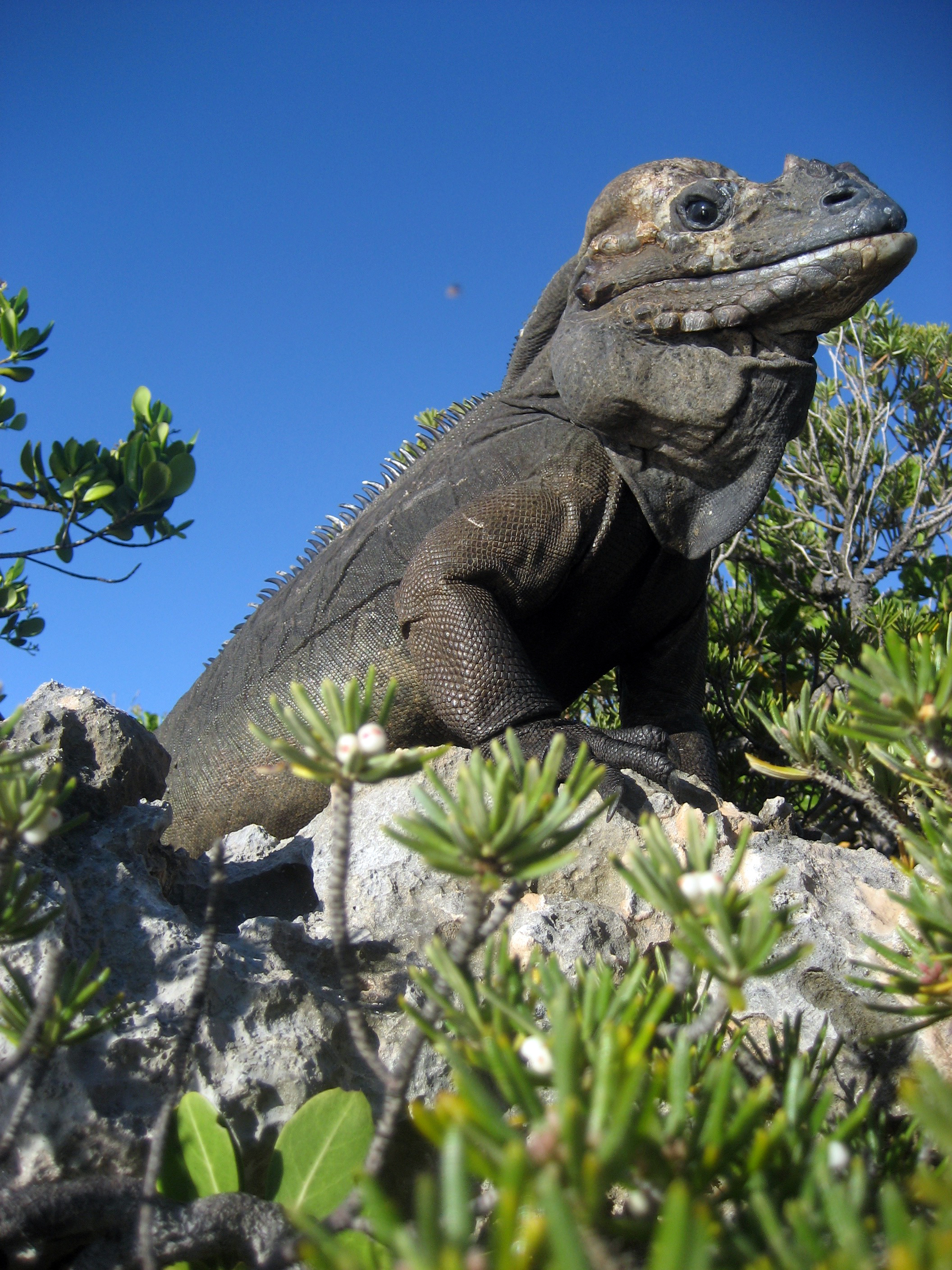

The Mona ground iguana is a large-bodied, heavy-headed lizard with strong legs and a vertically flattened tail. It is capable of reaching 1.22 m (4 ft 0 in) in length (from snout to tail). A crest of pointed, horned scales extends from the nape of the neck to the tip of the tail. The color is a uniform gray to olive drab, with slight brown or blue colorations. Juveniles differ from adults in that they have gray transverse bands across their bodies. These bands last until they are sexually mature at about three years of age.

Males possess bony, prominent tubercles on their snouts resembling horns, adipose pads in the form of a helmet on the occipital region of their heads, and large dewlaps. This subspecies, like other species of Cyclura, is sexually dimorphic; males are larger than females, and have more prominent dorsal crests, "horns" and femoral pores on their thighs, which are used to release pheromones. Thomas Wiewandt, who spent an extended period on Mona Island studying C. stejnegeri, suggested that the horns, along with lateral spines and prominent parietal bulges, function as protective armor against sharp rocks or as defensive tools to facilitate the escape of males from the grasp of one another.

== Habitat ==
Mona ground iguanas are diurnal and spend most of the day basking in the sun conserving energy. Mona ground iguanas are endemic to Mona Island; they are scattered through the entire island, though the southwest part of the island is used only during the nesting season. They live a considerable portion of their lives underground, and are usually found in talus slopes, caves and sinkhole depressions. The average depth underground in which they can be found is 1.5 m (4 ft 11 in).

== Reproduction ==
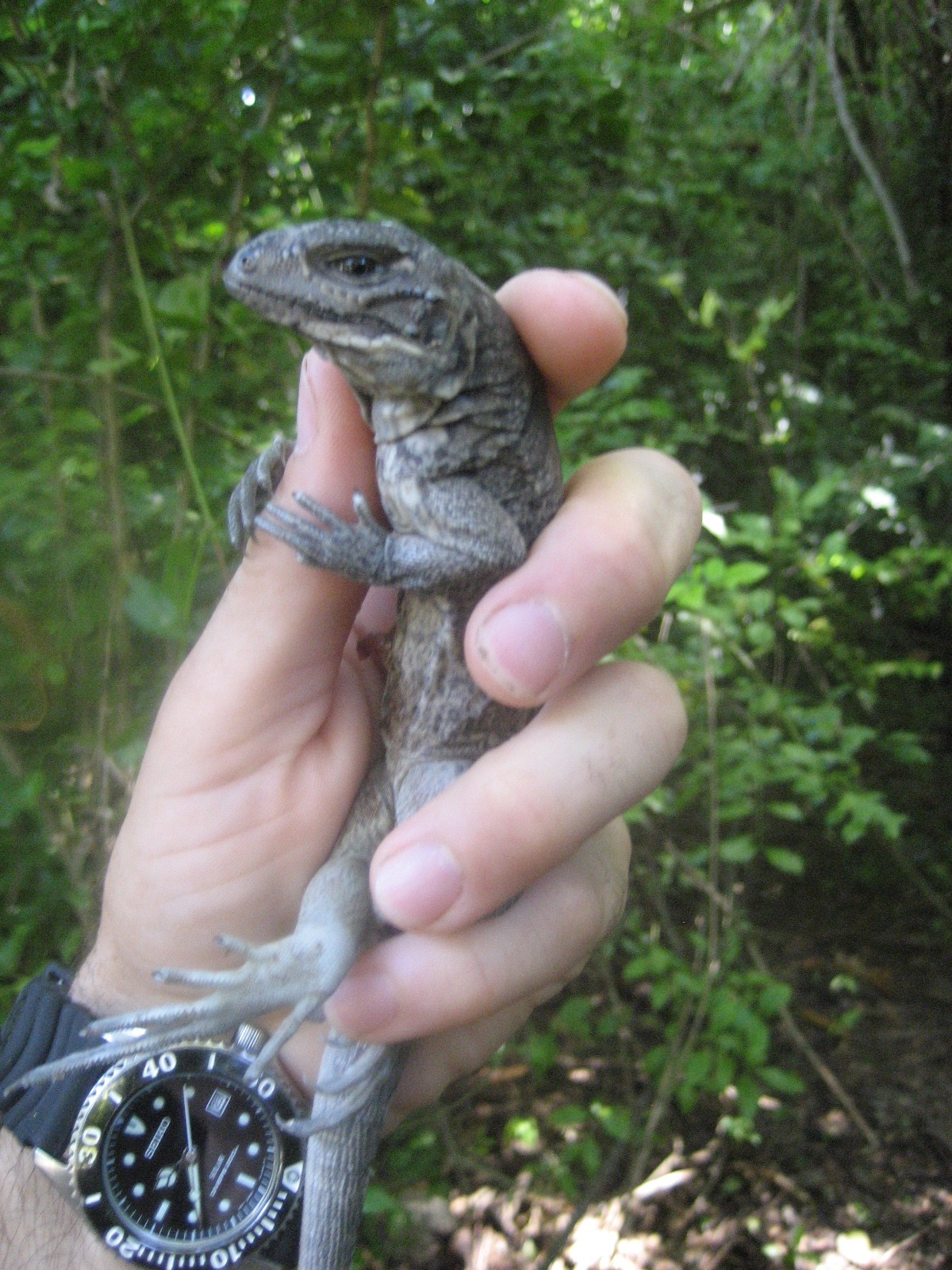
Mona ground iguana hatchling

Although Mona ground iguanas use the whole island as their habitat, only 1% of the territory, which contains loose sand and receives direct sunlight and is located on the southwest coast, is suitable for nesting. The females bury their eggs in the sand, and the sunlight incubates the eggs. Males reach sexual maturity at a size of 28–31 cm (11–12 in) in length from snout to vent, usually in their third to fourth year, while females mature one year later at a size of 35–40 cm (14–16 in).

Nesting season begins in the second week of June. Usually, one female mates with more than one male in the two weeks the mating season lasts. Copulation may last from 15 sec to 2 mins and 15 sec. One month later, nesting begins. Females will dig a tunnel 0.91 m (3 ft) long located one to two feet underground, where they deposit from five to 19 eggs, with 12 being the average. They will guard their nests for several days, but provide no parental care for the hatchlings, which hatch three months later. Hatchlings measure, on average, 32 cm (13 in) and weigh 73.7 g (2.60 oz) and grow at a rate of 5.23 cm (2.06 in) per year.

== Diet ==
Mona ground iguanas, like most Cyclura species, are primarily herbivorous, consuming leaves, flowers, berries, and fruits from different plant species. A study in 2000 by Dr Allison Alberts of the San Diego Zoo revealed that seeds passing through the digestive tracts of Cycluras germinate more rapidly than those that do not. These seeds in the fruits consumed by Cyclura have an adaptive advantage, by sprouting before the end of very short rainy seasons. The Mona ground iguana is also an important means of distributing these seeds to new areas (particularly since females migrate to nesting sites) and, as the largest native herbivores of their ecosystems, they are essential for maintaining the balance between climate and vegetation. Their diets are very rarely supplemented with insect larvae, crabs, slugs, dead birds, and fungi; individual animals do appear to be opportunistic carnivores. Fewer than a dozen animal species and 71 plant species are found in the Mona ground iguanas' diets. Mona ground iguanas eat the caterpillar of sphingid moths. These larvae feed on poisonous plants and are aposematically colored and avoided by other predators.

== Endangered status ==
Population numbers are estimated at 1,500 with lower densities than similar iguana-inhabited islands in the West Indies. Immature iguanas are scarce and represent only 5–10% of the population, revealing that the population is aging and in decline.

=== Reasons for decline ===
The biggest threat to C. stejnegeri are invasive species; feral pigs pose the most serious threat, as they root up iguana nests, and like most Cyclura species, the Mona ground iguana nests communally and at high density. Introduced goats and pigs are a major competitor for food, and overbrowsing by goats also leads to loss of protective cover from birds of prey such as the osprey and predation of juveniles by feral cats.

=== Recovery efforts ===
A headstarting program was put into place by the Puerto Rico Department of Natural and Environmental Resources, with cooperation from the IUCN Iguana Specialist Group, the U.S. Fish and Wildlife Service, the Toledo Zoo, and the University of Puerto Rico in 1999, to aid in the recovery of the Mona ground iguana. From within the safety of this program, the iguanas are reared until they are large enough to survive in the wild, and predators, such as pigs and feral cats, are no longer a threat. The facility also carries out health screening prior to the release of specimens. This health screening has been used to provide baselines of the normal physiologic values of the species, identifying potential future problems due to parasites, diseases, etc. that might threaten the population.

Gallery of the Mona ground iguana
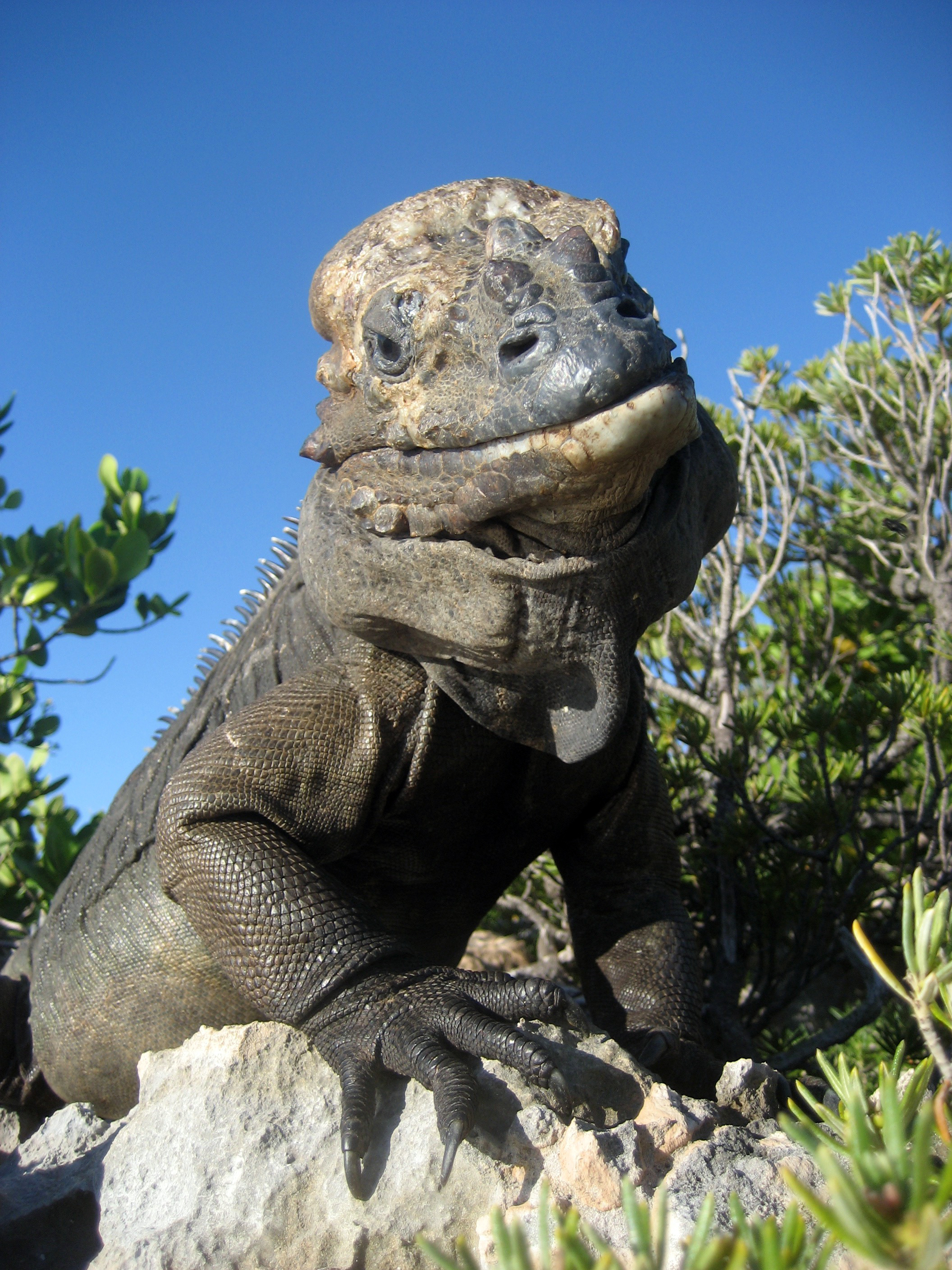
Mona iguana front shot

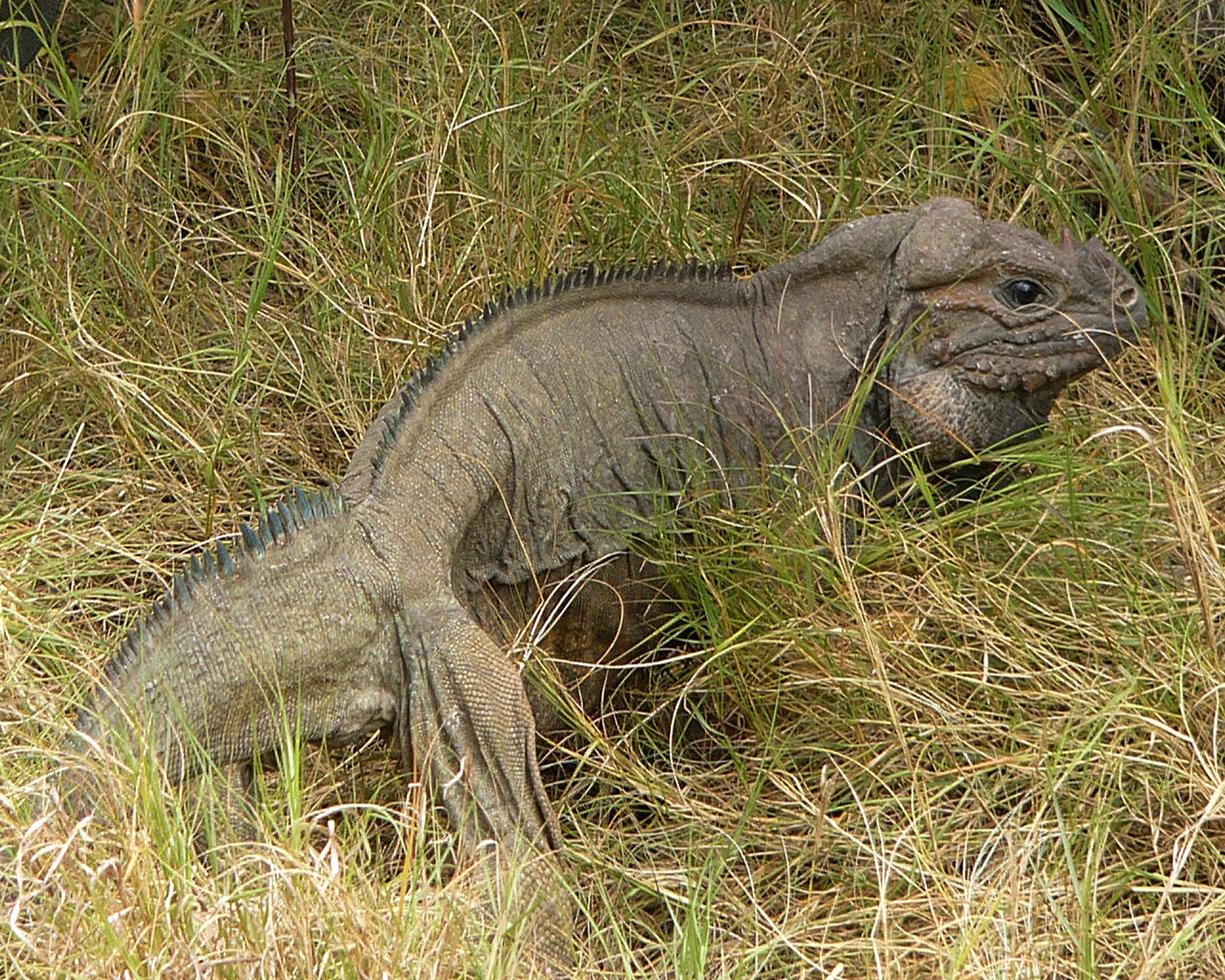
Full body shot of iguana in the grass

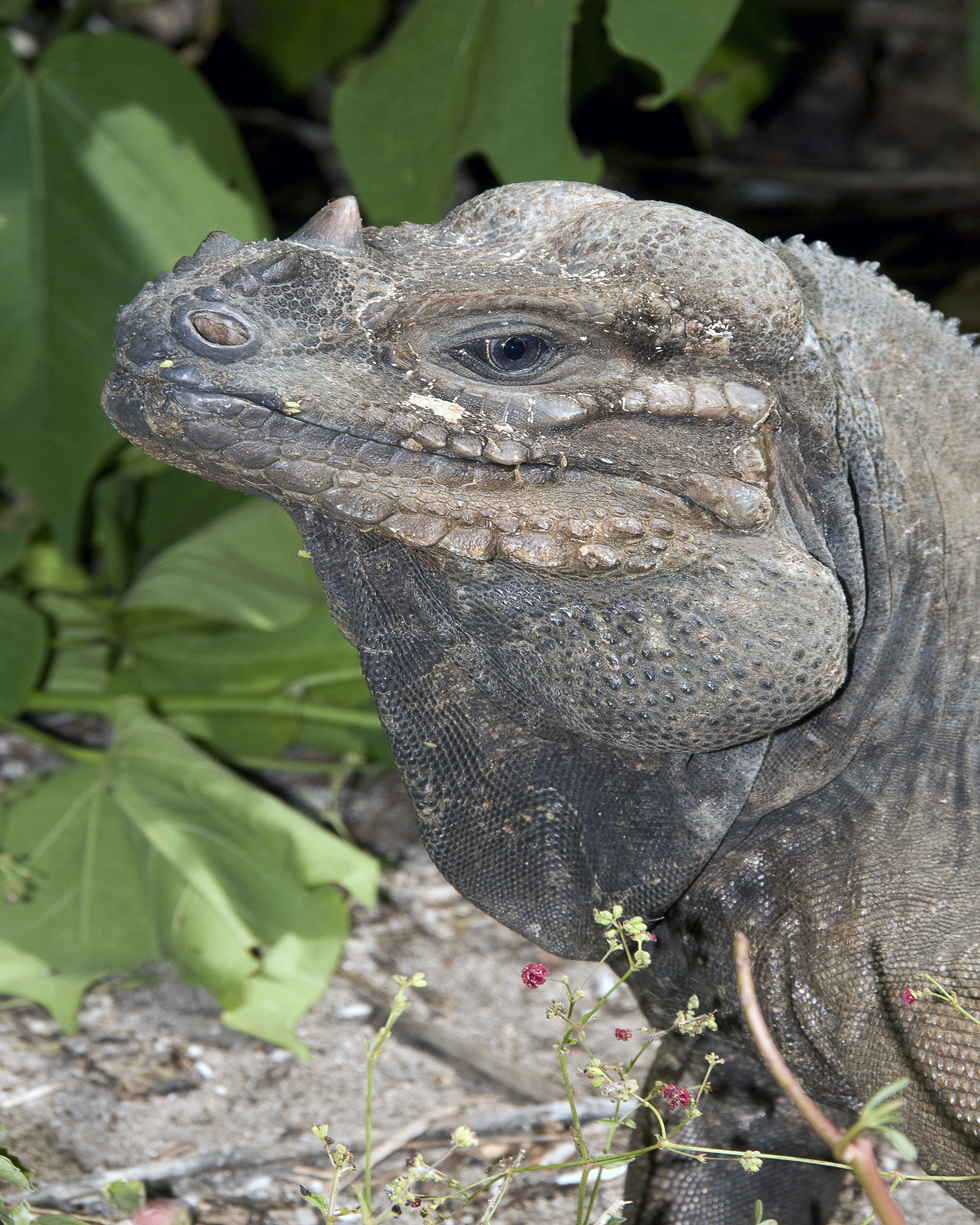
Close-up of head and shoulder

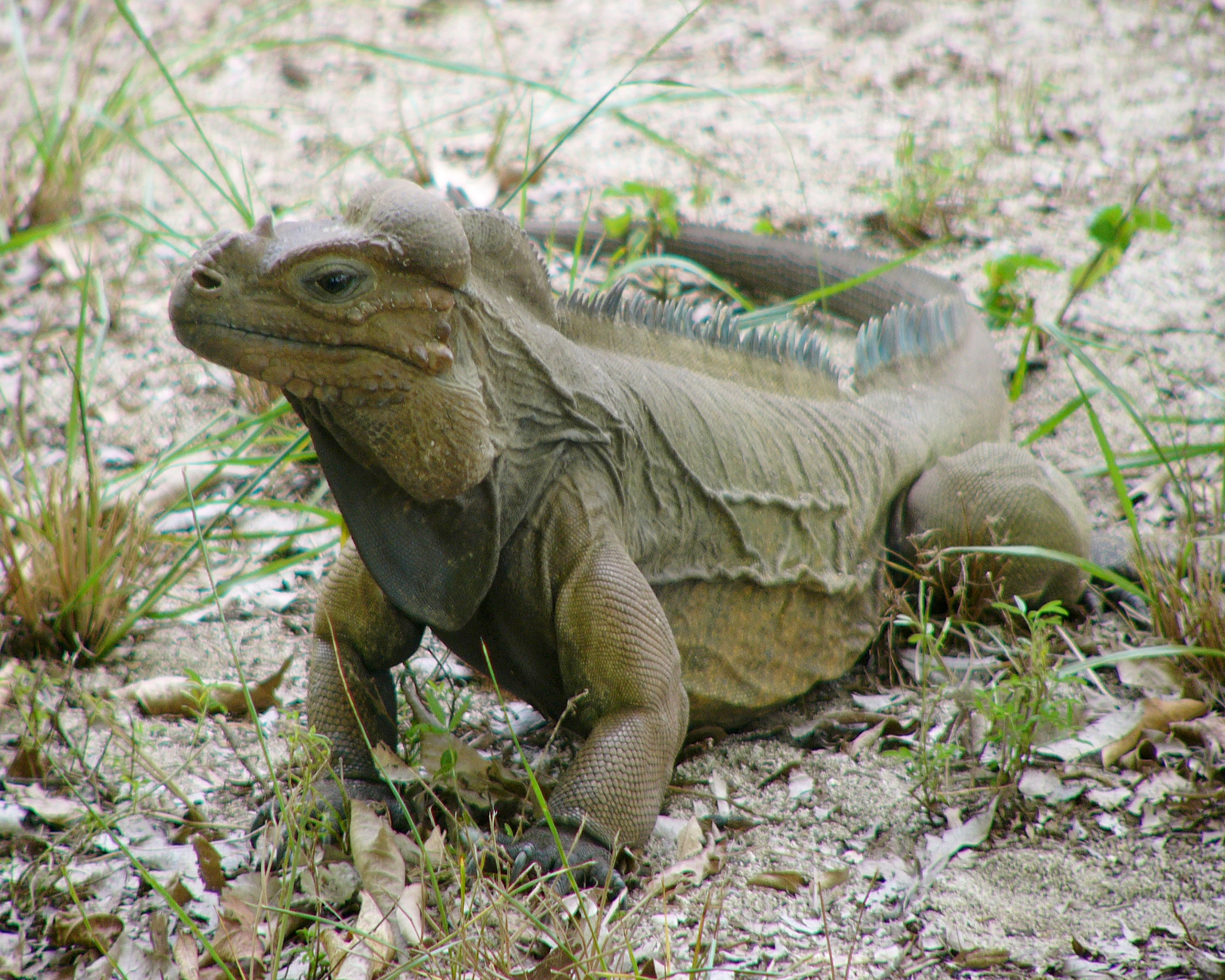
Iguana pausing in the grass

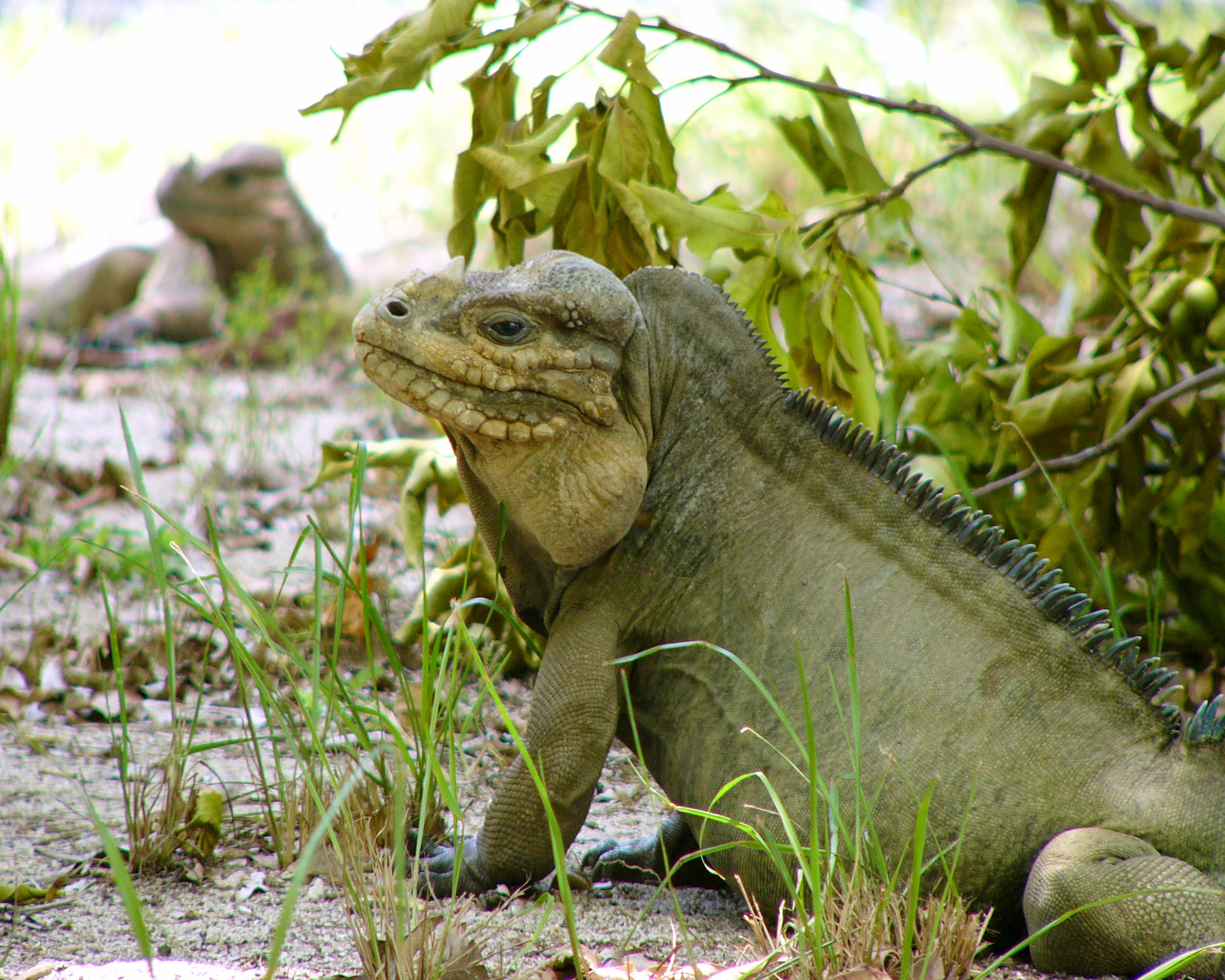
Iguana sitting down

== See also ==
- Fauna of Puerto Rico
- List of reptiles of Puerto Rico
- List of endemic fauna of Puerto Rico
