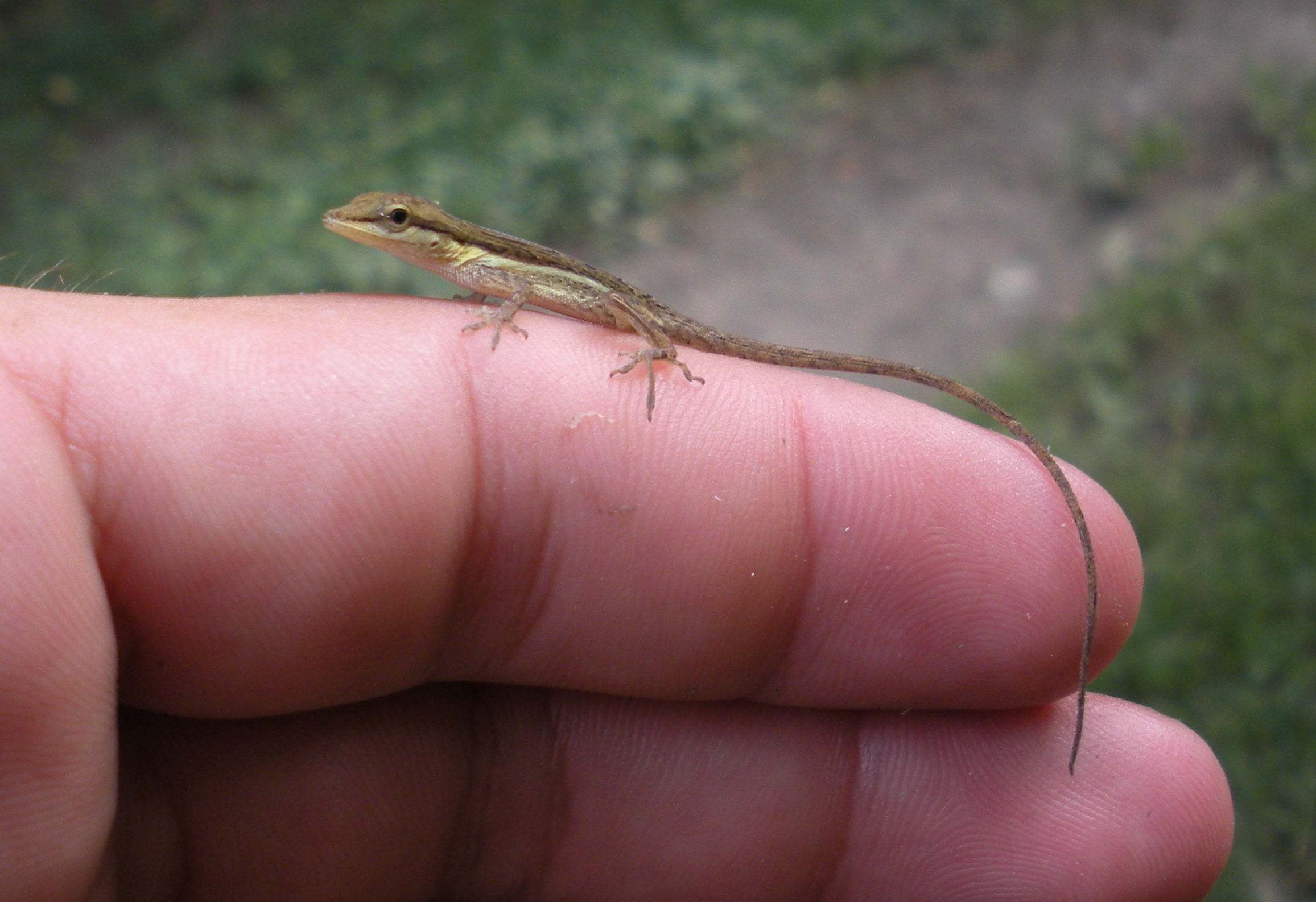
- Juvenile

Conservation status
- Least Concern (IUCN 3.1)

Scientific classification
- Kingdom: Animalia
- Phylum: Chordata
- Class: Reptilia
- Order: Squamata
- Suborder: Iguania
- Family: Anolidae
- Genus: Anolis
- Species: A. pulchellus

Binomial name
- Anolis pulchellus Duméril and Bibron, 1837

= Anolis pulchellus =

Species of reptile

Anolis pulchellus, the Puerto Rican anole, Puerto Rican bush anole, snake anole, or sharp-mouthed lizard, is a small species of anole lizard in the family Dactyloidae. The species is among the most common lizards in Puerto Rico, and also native to Vieques, Culebra, and the Virgin Islands (except St. Croix).

The sharp-mouthed lizard measures approximately 35 to 43 mm (1.4 to 1.7 in) in length from snout to vent. The species has a yellow-brown color with males having a purple dewlap that blends into crimson near the tip.

The anoles of the Greater Antilles have been extensively studied since they represent an interesting case of adaptive radiation. Species are more closely related to other species within the same island than to species of adjacent islands. Even though species divergence occurred independently on each island, the same set of ecomorphs (habitat specialists) have evolved on each island. Anolis pulchellus is considered a grass-bush anole, occurring primarily in bushes or grass.

== See also ==
- Fauna of Puerto Rico
- List of reptiles of Puerto Rico
