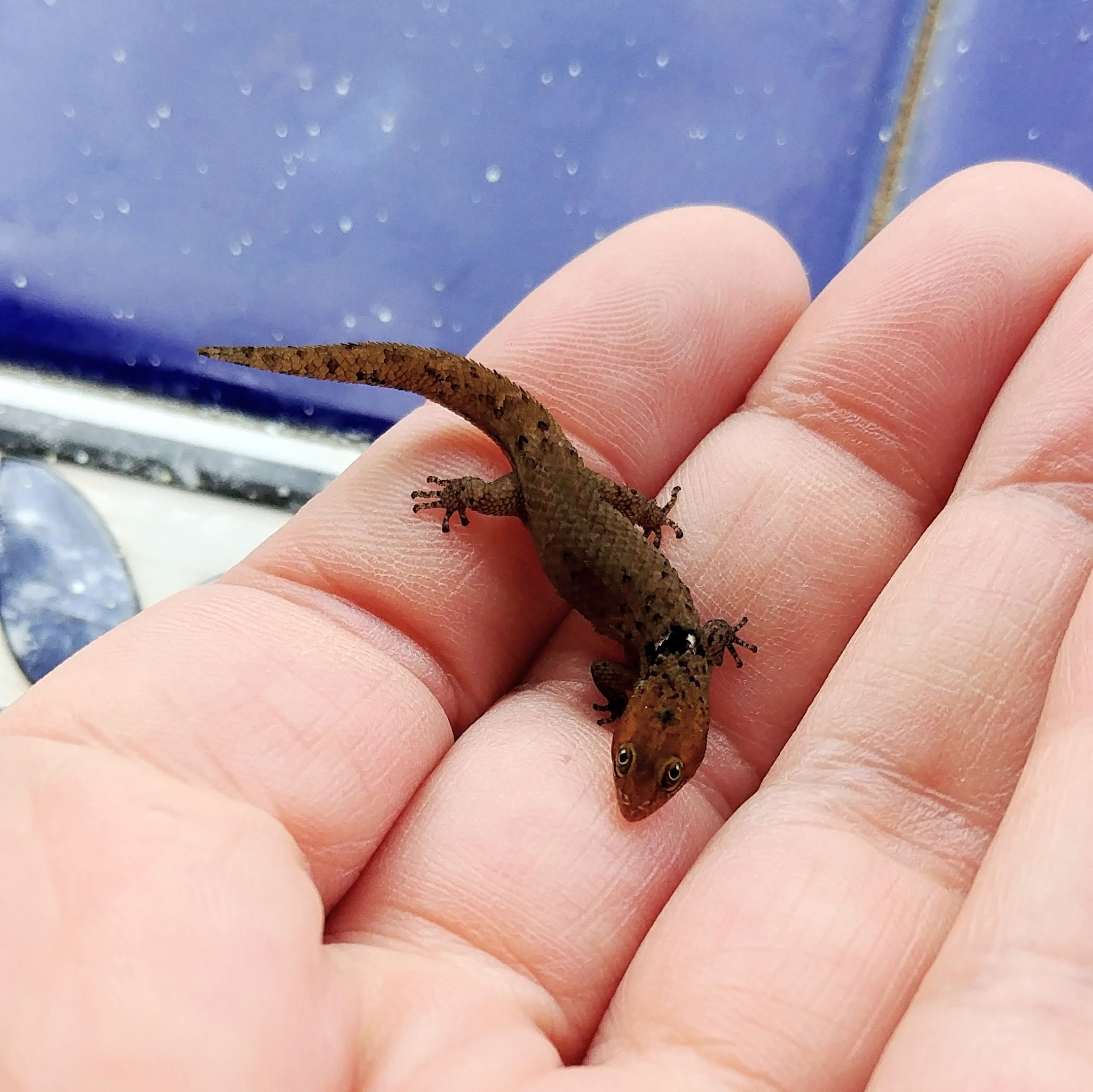

Scientific classification
- Kingdom: Animalia
- Phylum: Chordata
- Class: Reptilia
- Order: Squamata
- Suborder: Gekkota
- Family: Sphaerodactylidae
- Genus: Sphaerodactylus
- Species: S. inigoi

Binomial name
- Sphaerodactylus inigoi Thomas & Schwartz, 1966
- Sphaerodactylus inigoi range map

Synonyms
- Sphaerodactylus macrolepis inigoi Thomas & Schwartz, 1966; Sphaerodactylus inigoi Daza et al., 2019

= Sphaerodactylus inigoi =

Sphaerodactylus inigoi Temporal range: Middle Pleistocene–Present

Species of lizard

The Isla Vieques dwarf gecko (Sphaerodactylus inigoi) is a species of lizard in the family Sphaerodactylidae. It is endemic to Vieques and western Culebra in Puerto Rico.

== Description ==
Sphaerodactylus inigoi is only 3-4 cm in length, making it one of the smallest geckos in the world. It belongs to the dwarf gecko genus Sphaerodactylus, which is known also for their round pupils and round adhesive pads on their digits.

S. inigoi is sexually dimorphic. Females have gray or light brown colored heads with very well-defined head patterns, forming a central blotch, while males have much fainter patterns on their red or orange heads. In Vieques, females also have pigmentation on their throats that males lack, while in Culebra, males may have some orange or yellow pigmentation on their throats.

== Taxonomy ==
When Leonhard Steineger described his new species Sphaerodactylus grandisquamis in 1904, he included the dwarf gecko's of Isla Vieques. The parent species was then transferred to Sphaerodactylus macrolepis in 1928. The American zoologists Thomas & Schwartz were the first to distinguish the Vieques lizards as a new subspecies called S. m. inigoi, which they described in their 1966 paper. The holotype was an adult female identified in 1964 in Ensenada Sombe, near what is now Esperanza, Vieques. The subspecies was included in herpetological surveys for decades.

The present taxonomy for the Vieques geckos is based on a comprehensive phylogenetic and morphological study of the S. macrolepis species complex from Daza, Pinto, and Thomas, et al. (2019). In their taxonomic revision, they elevated S. inigoi from subspecies to full species status based on morphological and molecular data. They also found populations of S. macrolepis living on the eastern and southern parts of the island, distinct from the S. inigoi populations to the northwest. Finally, they resurrected S. grandisquamis to refer to all other subspecies on the mainland of Puerto Rico.

== Etymology ==
The species name inigoi is given after Sr. Felix Iñigo from Puerto Rico's Department of Agriculture and Commerce.

== Ecology ==
Sphaerodactylus inigoi is oviparous. The lizards can be found among coastal vegetation such as Coccoloba and coconut palms. Dwarf geckos do not face a high risk of predation on Vieques or Culebra island. Nevertheless, predators include the Puerto Rican bush anole, the Puerto Rican racer snake, and the bridled quail-dove. The diet of S. inigoi is composed of small arthropods, and particularly springtails, but also insects and spiders.
