= Puerto Rican worm snake =

Conservation status
- Least Concern (IUCN 3.1)

Scientific classification
- Kingdom: Animalia
- Phylum: Chordata
- Class: Reptilia
- Order: Squamata
- Suborder: Serpentes
- Family: Typhlopidae
- Genus: Typhlops
- Species: T. rostellatus

Binomial name
- Typhlops rostellatus Stejneger, 1904

Synonyms
- Typhlops rostellata

Species of reptile

The Puerto Rican worm snake (Typhlops rostellatus) is a species of snake in the Typhlopidae family.

== See also ==
- List of amphibians and reptiles of Puerto Rico
- Fauna of Puerto Rico
- List of endemic fauna of Puerto Rico
