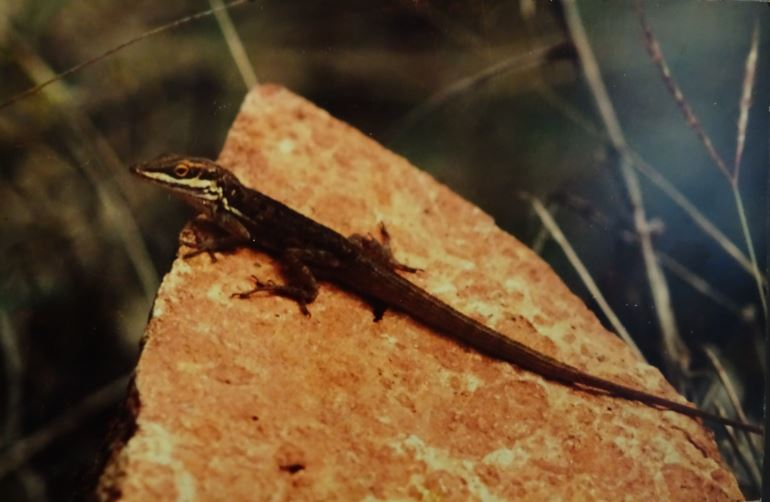
- In Ponce, Puerto Rico

Conservation status
- Least Concern (IUCN 3.1)

Scientific classification
- Kingdom: Animalia
- Phylum: Chordata
- Class: Reptilia
- Order: Squamata
- Suborder: Iguania
- Family: Dactyloidae
- Genus: Anolis
- Species: A. poncensis

Binomial name
- Anolis poncensis Stejneger, 1904

Synonyms
- Ctenonotus poncensis Nicholson, et al., 2012

= Anolis poncensis =

Ponce anole

Species of reptile

Anolis poncensis (commonly known as Ponce small-fanned anole, Ponce anole and dryland grass anole;) is a species of lizard of the family of Dactyloidae. The species is endemic to Puerto Rico. It was first identified in Ponce, in the hills three miles east (Note: There are no hills east of Ponce; all hills near Ponce are either north or west of Ponce. As the map on page 619 of this following source (https://faculty.unlv.edu/jrodriguez/39.pdf [Living together but remaining apart: comparative phylogeography of Anolis poncensis and A. cooki, two lizards endemic to the aridlands of Puerto Rico]) shows, as well as the location descriptions ("El Tuque", etc.,) given there (example: p. 621), the habitat for this species is clearly in the hills --and drylands-- west (not east) of Ponce, and, as such, Stejneger 1904's documentation appears to be a typo, most likely due to human directional interpretation error.) of the city. The Puerto Rico Department of Natural and Environmental Resources considers it a "vulnerable species".

== Description ==
The body of this anole is longer and more slender than other grass Anoles. It has distinguishing brownish dorsum, greenish sides, blue eyes, a small white dewlap, a short pale lateral line, and a number of black spots behind the eyes. Males grow up to 44 mm (1.7 in) and females up to 40 mm (1.6 in).

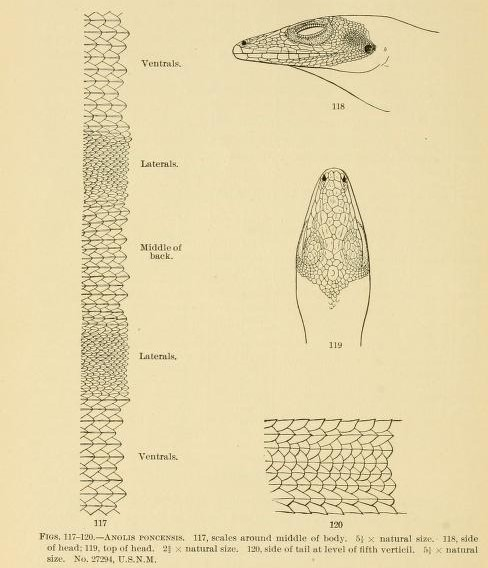
Anolis poncensis diagram from Stejneger, L. "The herpetology of Porto Rico". Rept. United States Natl. Mus. 1902: pp. 666. (1904).

== Distribution ==
This species is endemic to Puerto Rico. Its distribution is rather small, being limited to the arid and semi-arid western half of the southern coast of the island. It was identified and catalogued in 1902 by Leonhard Stejneger, a curator with the Division of Reptiles and Batrachians of the United States National Museum.

== Etymology ==
Its species name, consisting of "ponce" plus the Latin suffix -nsis, was given in reference to the place of its discovery, the city of Ponce. Its discovery and documentation were originally published in Stejneger, 1904: "The herpetology of Porto Rico".

== See also ==
- Fauna of Puerto Rico
- List of reptiles of Puerto Rico
