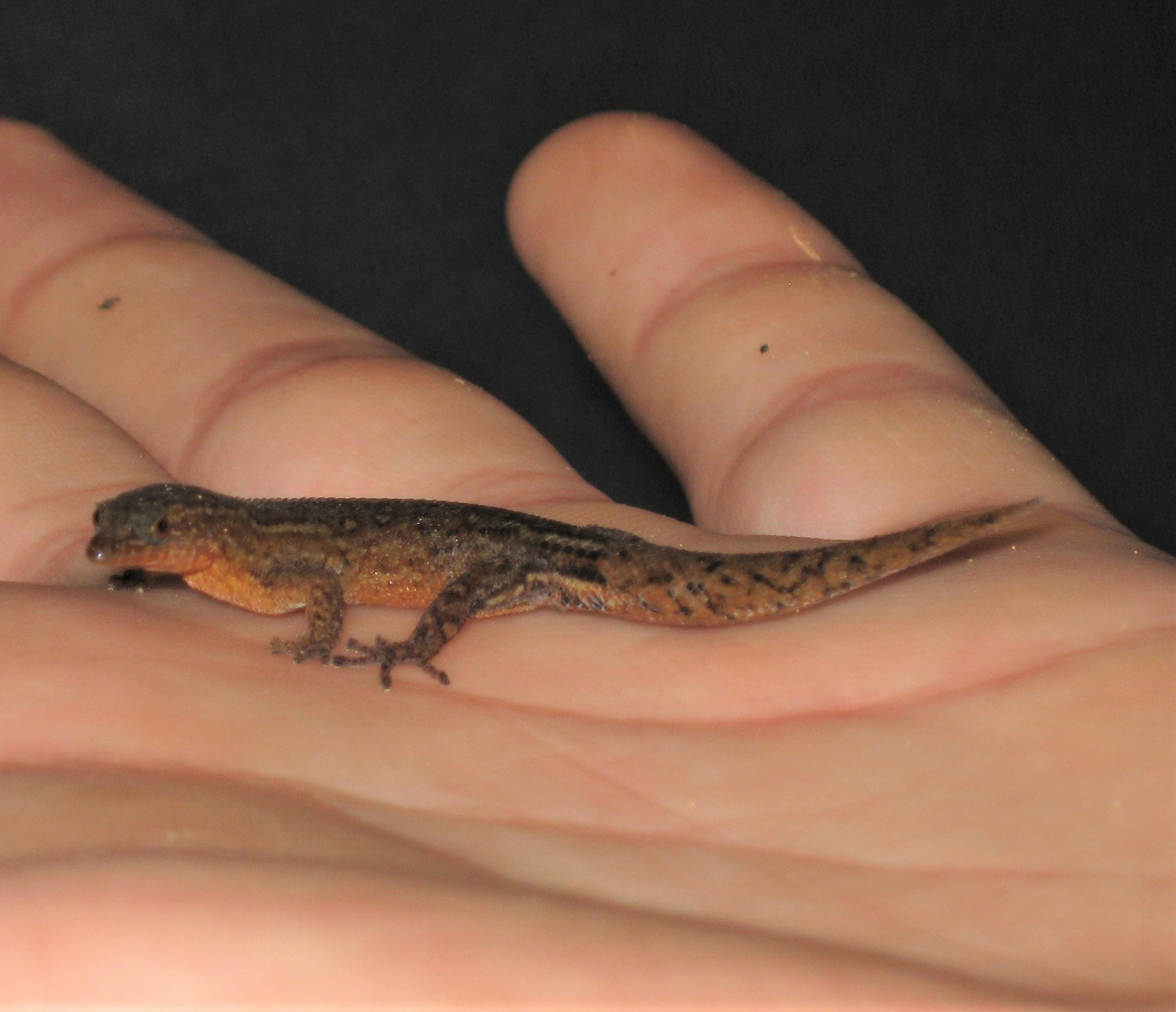

Conservation status
- Least Concern (IUCN 3.1)

Scientific classification
- Kingdom: Animalia
- Phylum: Chordata
- Class: Reptilia
- Order: Squamata
- Suborder: Gekkota
- Family: Sphaerodactylidae
- Genus: Sphaerodactylus
- Species: S. k.

Binomial name
- Sphaerodactylus klauberi Grant, 1931

= Sphaerodactylus klauberi =

Species of reptile

Sphaerodactylus klauberi is a species of gecko, a lizard in the family Sphaerodactylidae The species is endemic to the archipelago of Puerto Rico.

== Common names ==
Common names for S. klauberi include Klauber's dwarf gecko, Klauber's least gecko, Puerto Rican highland sphaero, Puerto Rican upland gecko, and Puerto Rican upland sphaero.

== Etymology ==
The epithet or specific name, klauberi, is in honor of American herpetologist Laurence Monroe Klauber.

== Description ==
Sphaerodactylus klauberi is one of the larger-sized Sphaerodactylus species. It may attain a snout-to-vent length (SVL) of 37 mm (1.5 in). Its colorings consist of a dark-brown upper body with darker-brown or black spots which become larger on the tail. The underbody is usually orange or reddish-pink with a gray throat that may have dark mottled areas.

== Behavior ==
Like all Sphaerodactylus species, S. klauberi is voiceless. It is mostly active at night.

== Diet ==
S. klauberi is an insectivore.

== Reproduction ==
The female of S. klauberi lays one hard-shelled egg that can be as large as her head. The egg's incubation lasts 2 to 3 months.

== Habitat ==
S. klauberi specimens have been collected between 160 ft (50 m) and 3,600 ft (1,097 m) in elevation. They can sometimes be seen on the ground or on low branches in the Tabonuco, Colorado, and Palma Sierra sections of the Caribbean National Rain Forest.

== See also ==
- List of amphibians and reptiles of Puerto Rico
- Fauna of Puerto Rico
- List of endemic fauna of Puerto Rico
