= Diploglossus pleii =

Conservation status
- Least Concern (IUCN 3.1)

Scientific classification
- Kingdom: Animalia
- Phylum: Chordata
- Class: Reptilia
- Order: Squamata
- Suborder: Anguimorpha
- Family: Diploglossidae
- Genus: Diploglossus
- Species: D. pleii

Binomial name
- Diploglossus pleii Duméril & Bibron, 1839

Species of lizard

Diploglossus pleii, the Puerto Rican galliwasp, is a species of lizard of the Diploglossidae family endemic to Puerto Rico. It inhabits the Northern Karst Belt, the Central Mountains, and the Luquillo Forest, where it inhabits moist habitats like forest, woodland edge, coffee plantations, and sugarcane farms at elevations of 50–670 m (160–2,200 ft). It is found under thick leaf litter. It is classified as being of least-concern by the IUCN despite its rather restricted range due to its relative abundance and stable population.

== Taxonomy ==
Diploglossus pleii was formally described in 1839 by the French zoologists André Marie Constant Duméril and Gabriel Bibron. They incorrectly gave the type locality as Martinique. The species is named after Auguste Plee, a French collecter who was active in the Antilles and Colombia. It has the English common name Puerto Rican galliwasp and the Spanish common name Culebra de Cuatro Patas.

== Description ==
Diploglossus pleii has a base color of glossy mahogany brown.

== Distribution and ecology ==
Diploglossus pleii is only found on Puerto Rico, where it inhabits the Northern Karst Belt, the Central Mountains, and the Luquillo Forest. It inhabits moist forest and woodland edge habitats at elevations of 50–670 m (160–2,200 ft). It is also known from agricultural areas such as coffee plantations and sugarcane farms. It is found under thick leaf litter.

The species has eggs that develop within its body, following which it gives live birth. A mating ritual has been observed in the species where two galliwasps lie side-by-side, following which the male bites the female's head.

== Conservation ==
Diploglossus pleii is classified as being of least-concern by the IUCN. Despite having a rather restricted range, it is fairly common, with a stable population and no pressing threats to its survival. Although hard to find, it is common in certain localities, with densities as high as 20 individuals in a 36 sq m patch of suitable leaf litter.
