= Pholidoscelis alboguttatus =

Scientific classification
- Domain: Eukaryota
- Kingdom: Animalia
- Phylum: Chordata
- Class: Reptilia
- Order: Squamata
- Family: Teiidae
- Genus: Pholidoscelis
- Species: P. alboguttatus

Binomial name
- Pholidoscelis alboguttatus (Boulenger, 1896)

Species of lizard

Pholidoscelis alboguttatus, the Mona ground lizard or Mona ameiva, is a member of the family Teiidae of lizards. It is endemic to Isla de Mona in Puerto Rico.
