= Sphaerodactylus gaigeae =

Conservation status
- Least Concern (IUCN 3.1)

Scientific classification
- Kingdom: Animalia
- Phylum: Chordata
- Class: Reptilia
- Order: Squamata
- Suborder: Gekkota
- Family: Sphaerodactylidae
- Genus: Sphaerodactylus
- Species: S. gaigeae

Binomial name
- Sphaerodactylus gaigeae Grant, 1932

Species of reptile

Sphaerodactylus gaigeae, also known commonly as the chevronated sphaero or Gaige's least gecko, is a species of lizard in the family Sphaerodactylidae . The species is endemic to Puerto Rico.

== Etymology ==
The specific name, gaigeae, is in honor of American herpetologist Helen Beulah Thompson Gaige.

== Habitat ==
The preferred habitat of S. gaigeae is forest at altitudes of 0–450 m (0–1,476 ft).

== Description ==
Adults of S. gaigeae may attain a snout-to-vent length (SVL) of 22–25 mm (0.87–0.98 in).

== Reproduction ==
S. gaigeae is oviparous.
