= Amphisbaena schmidti =

Conservation status
- Least Concern (IUCN 3.1)

Scientific classification
- Kingdom: Animalia
- Phylum: Chordata
- Class: Reptilia
- Order: Squamata
- Clade: Amphisbaenia
- Family: Amphisbaenidae
- Genus: Amphisbaena
- Species: A. schmidti

Binomial name
- Amphisbaena schmidti Gans, 1964
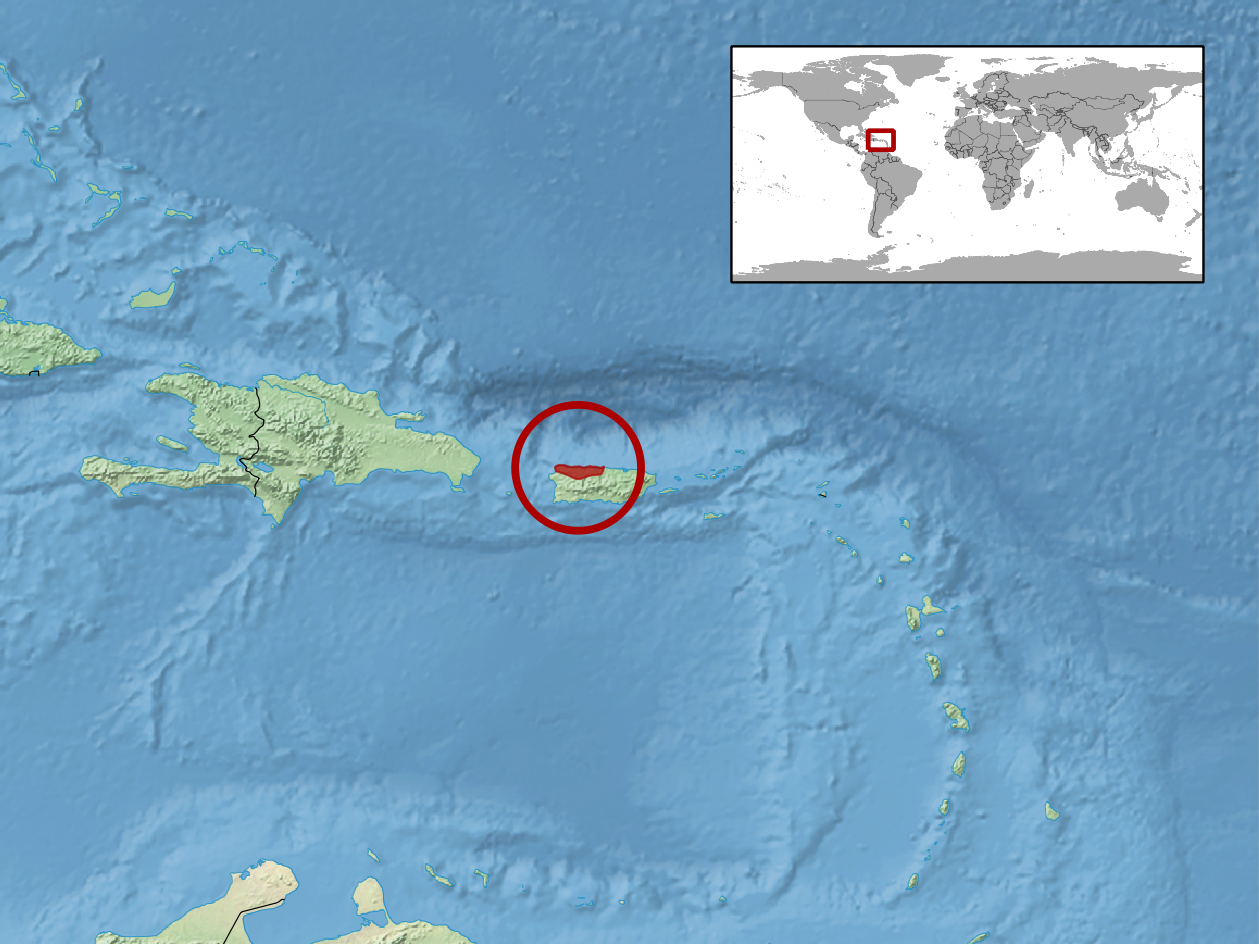
- Geographic distribution of Amphisbaena schmidti

Species of reptile

Amphisbaena schmidti, known commonly as Schmidt's worm lizard or the Puerto Rican dusky worm lizard, is a species of amphisbaenian in the family Amphisbaenidae. The species is endemic to the Caribbean.

== Etymology ==
The specific name, schmidti, is in honor of American herpetologist Karl Patterson Schmidt.

== Geographic range ==
A. schmidti is found in Puerto Rico.

== Habitat ==
The preferred habitats of A. schmidti are shrubland, forest, and grassland at altitudes of 0–400 m (0–1,312 ft).

== Reproduction ==
A. schmidti is oviparous.

== See also ==
- Fauna of Puerto Rico
- List of endemic fauna of Puerto Rico
