= Anolis monensis =

Conservation status
- Least Concern (IUCN 3.1)

Scientific classification
- Kingdom: Animalia
- Phylum: Chordata
- Class: Reptilia
- Order: Squamata
- Suborder: Iguania
- Family: Dactyloidae
- Genus: Anolis
- Species: A. monensis

Binomial name
- Anolis monensis Stejneger, 1904

Species of lizard

Anolis monensis, the Mona anole, is a species of lizard in the family Dactyloidae. The species is found on Isla de Mona in Puerto Rico.
