= Baker's worm lizard =

Conservation status
- Least Concern (IUCN 3.1)

Scientific classification
- Kingdom: Animalia
- Phylum: Chordata
- Class: Reptilia
- Order: Squamata
- Clade: Amphisbaenia
- Family: Amphisbaenidae
- Genus: Amphisbaena
- Species: A. bakeri

Binomial name
- Amphisbaena bakeri Stejneger, 1904

Species of reptile

Baker's worm lizard (Amphisbaena bakeri) is a species of worm lizard in the family Amphisbaenidae.

== Geographic range ==
A. bakeri is endemic to Puerto Rico.

== Habitat ==
The preferred habitat of A. bakeri is forest at altitudes of 0–600 m (0–1,969 ft).

== Reproduction ==
A. bakeri is oviparous.

== Etymology ==
The specific name, bakeri, is in honor of Arthur B. Baker, a zoologist with the United States Fish Commission in Puerto Rico, who collected the type specimen.

== See also ==
- List of amphibians and reptiles of Puerto Rico
- Fauna of Puerto Rico
- List of endemic fauna of Puerto Rico
