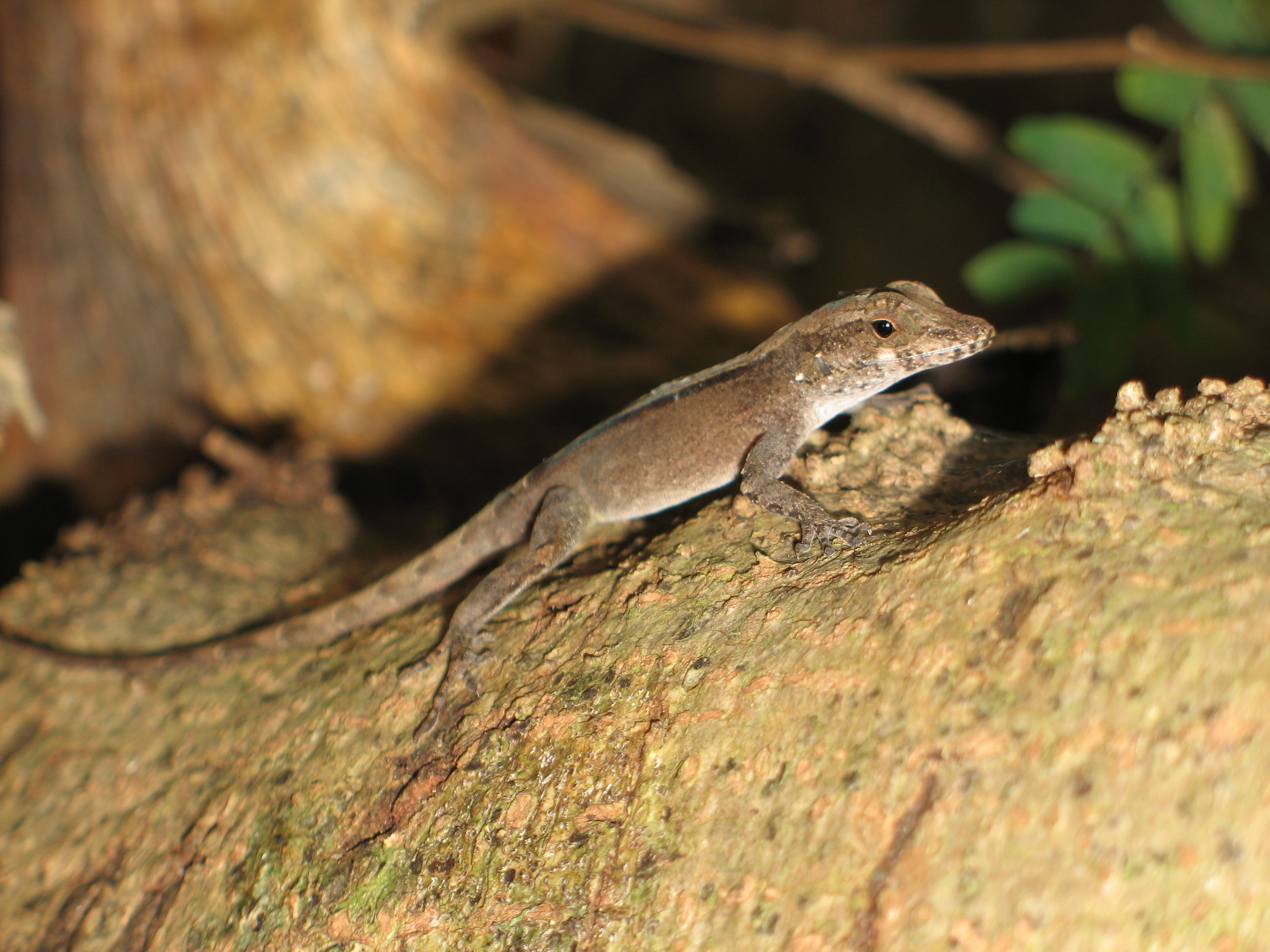

Conservation status
- Endangered (IUCN 3.1)

Scientific classification
- Kingdom: Animalia
- Phylum: Chordata
- Class: Reptilia
- Order: Squamata
- Suborder: Iguania
- Family: Dactyloidae
- Genus: Anolis
- Species: A. cooki

Binomial name
- Anolis cooki Grant, 1931

Synonyms
- Anolis cristatellus cooki Grant, 1931; Anolis cooki — Thomas, 1966; Anolis cooki — Schwartz & Henderson, 1991; Ctenonotus cooki — Nicholson et al., 2012

= Anolis cooki =

Species of lizard

Anolis cooki, also known commonly as Cook's anole, Cook's pallid anole, and the Guanica pallid anole, is a species of lizard in the family Dactyloidae. The species is endemic to Puerto Rico.

== Etymology ==
The specific name, cooki, is in honor of Melville Thurston Cook (1869–1952), who was an American botanist and entomologist.

== Geographic range ==
A. cooki is found in southwestern Puerto Rico, including the island of Caja de Muertos.

== Habitat ==
The preferred natural habitat of A. cooki is forest, at altitudes from sea level to 100 m (330 ft).

== Description ==
Moderate-sized for the genus Anolis, males of A. cooki may attain a snout-to-vent length (SVL) of 7 cm (2.8 in). Females are smaller, attaining 6 cm (2.4 in) SVL.

== Reproduction ==
A. cooki is oviparous.

== Taxonomy ==
A. cooki was originally described as a subspecies of Anolis cristatellus but raised to species rank in 1966. In 2012 Nicholson et al. "split" the genus Anolis and placed A. cooki in the genus Ctenonotus, a move which has not been widely accepted.
