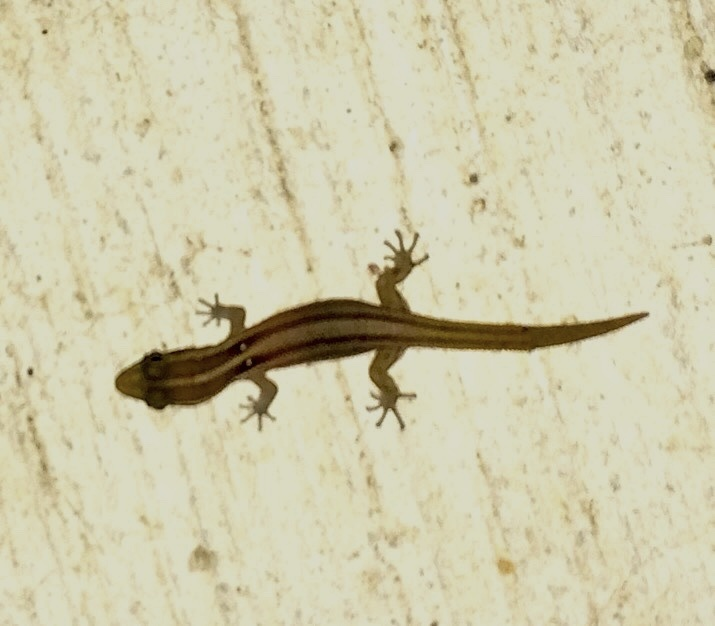

Conservation status
- Near Threatened (IUCN 3.1)

Scientific classification
- Kingdom: Animalia
- Phylum: Chordata
- Class: Reptilia
- Order: Squamata
- Suborder: Gekkota
- Family: Sphaerodactylidae
- Genus: Sphaerodactylus
- Species: S. roosevelti

Binomial name
- Sphaerodactylus roosevelti Grant, 1931

= Sphaerodactylus roosevelti =

Species of reptile

Sphaerodactylus roosevelti, also known commonly as Roosevelt's beige sphaero or Roosevelt's least gecko, is a small species of lizard in the family Sphaerodactylidae. The species is endemic to Puerto Rico.

== Etymology ==
The specific name, roosevelti, is in honor of Theodore Roosevelt Jr., who was Governor of Puerto Rico in 1931.

== Habitat ==
The preferred habitats of S. roosevelti are forest and shrubland at altitudes of 0–100 m (0–328 ft).

== Description ==
Adults of S. roosevelti have a snout-to-vent length (SVL) of 33–39 mm (1.3–1.5 in). All dorsal scales are large, strongly keeled, flattened, and overlapping. There is no middorsal zone of granular scales.

== Reproduction ==
S. roosevelti is oviparous.
