= Amphisbaena xera =

Conservation status
- Near Threatened (IUCN 3.1)

Scientific classification
- Kingdom: Animalia
- Phylum: Chordata
- Class: Reptilia
- Order: Squamata
- Suborder: Lacertoidea
- Clade: Amphisbaenia
- Family: Amphisbaenidae
- Genus: Amphisbaena
- Species: A. xera

Binomial name
- Amphisbaena xera Thomas, 1966

Species of reptile

Amphisbaena xera, known commonly as the dry worm lizard, Puerto Rican dryland worm lizard, or the North American worm lizard, is a worm lizard species. It is endemic to Puerto Rico.

== Etymology ==
The specific name, xera, which is from Greek via Late Latin, means "dry".

== Geographic range ==
It is found in Puerto Rico, both on the main island and also on the offshore Isla de Caja de Muertos.

== See also ==
- Fauna of Puerto Rico
- List of endemic fauna of Puerto Rico
