= Antillotyphlops monensis =

Conservation status
- Least Concern (IUCN 3.1)

Scientific classification
- Kingdom: Animalia
- Phylum: Chordata
- Class: Reptilia
- Order: Squamata
- Suborder: Serpentes
- Family: Typhlopidae
- Genus: Antillotyphlops
- Species: A. monensis

Binomial name
- Antillotyphlops monensis (Schmidt, 1926)

Synonyms
- Typhlops monensis - Schmidt, 1926

Species of reptile

Antillotyphlops monensis, the Mona worm snake, is a harmless blind snake species is endemic to Mona Island in the West Indies. No subspecies are currently recognized.

== Geographic range ==
Known only from the type locality, which is given as "Mona Island, West Indies."
