= Sphaerodactylus levinsi =

Conservation status
- Least Concern (IUCN 3.1)

Scientific classification
- Kingdom: Animalia
- Phylum: Chordata
- Class: Reptilia
- Order: Squamata
- Suborder: Gekkota
- Family: Sphaerodactylidae
- Genus: Sphaerodactylus
- Species: S. levinsi

Binomial name
- Sphaerodactylus levinsi Heatwole, 1968

Species of reptile

Sphaerodactylus levinsi, also known commonly as the Desecheo gecko or the Isla Desecheo least gecko, is a species of lizard in the family Sphaerodactylidae. The species is endemic to Desecheo Island in Puerto Rico.

== Etymology ==
The specific name, levinsi, is in honor of American theoretical ecologist Richard Levins.

== Habitat ==
The preferred habitat of S. levinsi is forest at altitudes of 0–218 m (0–715 ft).

== Description ==
The holotype of S. levinsi has a snout-to-vent length (SVL) of 28.2 mm (1.11 in).

== Reproduction ==
S. levinsi is oviparous.
