= Sphaerodactylus nicholsi =

Conservation status
- Least Concern (IUCN 3.1)

Scientific classification
- Kingdom: Animalia
- Phylum: Chordata
- Class: Reptilia
- Order: Squamata
- Suborder: Gekkota
- Family: Sphaerodactylidae
- Genus: Sphaerodactylus
- Species: S. nicholsi

Binomial name
- Sphaerodactylus nicholsi Grant, 1931

Species of reptile

Sphaerodactylus nicholsi, also known commonly as Nichol's dwarf sphaero, Nichols least gecko, and the Puerto Rican crescent geckolet, is a species of lizard in the family Sphaerodactylidae . The species is endemic to Puerto Rico.

== Etymology ==
The specific name, nicholsi, is in honor of American ichthyologist John Treadwell Nichols.

== Habitat ==
The preferred natural habitats of Sphaerodactylus nicholsi are forest, shrubland, and marine intertidal, at elevations from sea level to 450 m (1,480 ft), but it may also be found in introduced vegetation.

== Behavior ==
Sphaerodactylus nicholsi is terrestrial and diurnal.

== Reproduction ==
Sphaerodactylus nicholsi is oviparous.
