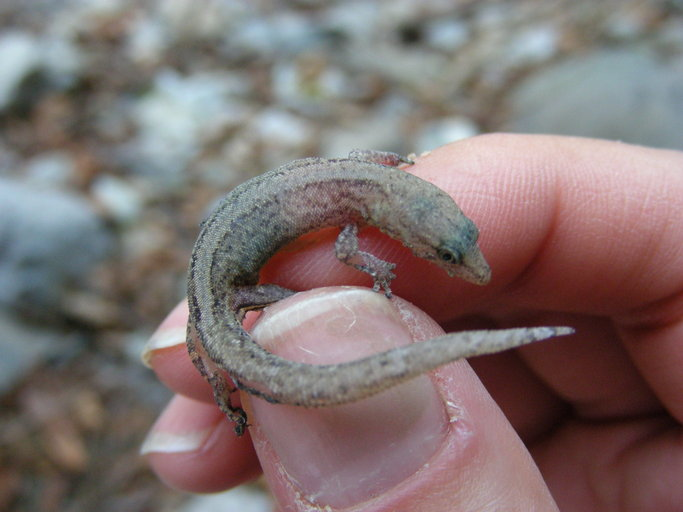

Conservation status
- Least Concern (IUCN 3.1)

Scientific classification
- Kingdom: Animalia
- Phylum: Chordata
- Class: Reptilia
- Order: Squamata
- Suborder: Gekkota
- Family: Sphaerodactylidae
- Genus: Sphaerodactylus
- Species: S. glaucus

Binomial name
- Sphaerodactylus glaucus Cope, 1865

= Sphaerodactylus glaucus =

Species of lizard

Sphaerodactylus glaucus is a species of gecko known by the common name collared dwarf gecko or least gecko. (geco-enano collarejo in Spanish). It is native to Mexico and parts of Central America, its range extending from Oaxaca and Veracruz in Mexico through Guatemala to Honduras.

This gecko has a cream-colored band bordered by two black bands around the neck. There is a similar band bordered by black spots at the base of the tail and another at the middle of the tail. It can be distinguished from S. continentalis by its dorsal scales, which are smooth rather than keeled. It is diurnal.

This species has been observed in several kinds of tropical forest, subtropical moist forest, and mangrove ecotones from sea level to 1000 meters in elevation. It is sometimes found near human habitation hiding under debris and in thatching.

This gecko is common in its range and faces no immediate major threats. It is sometimes prey and competition for the common house gecko (Hemidactylus frenatus) in human habitations, but not in wild habitat.
