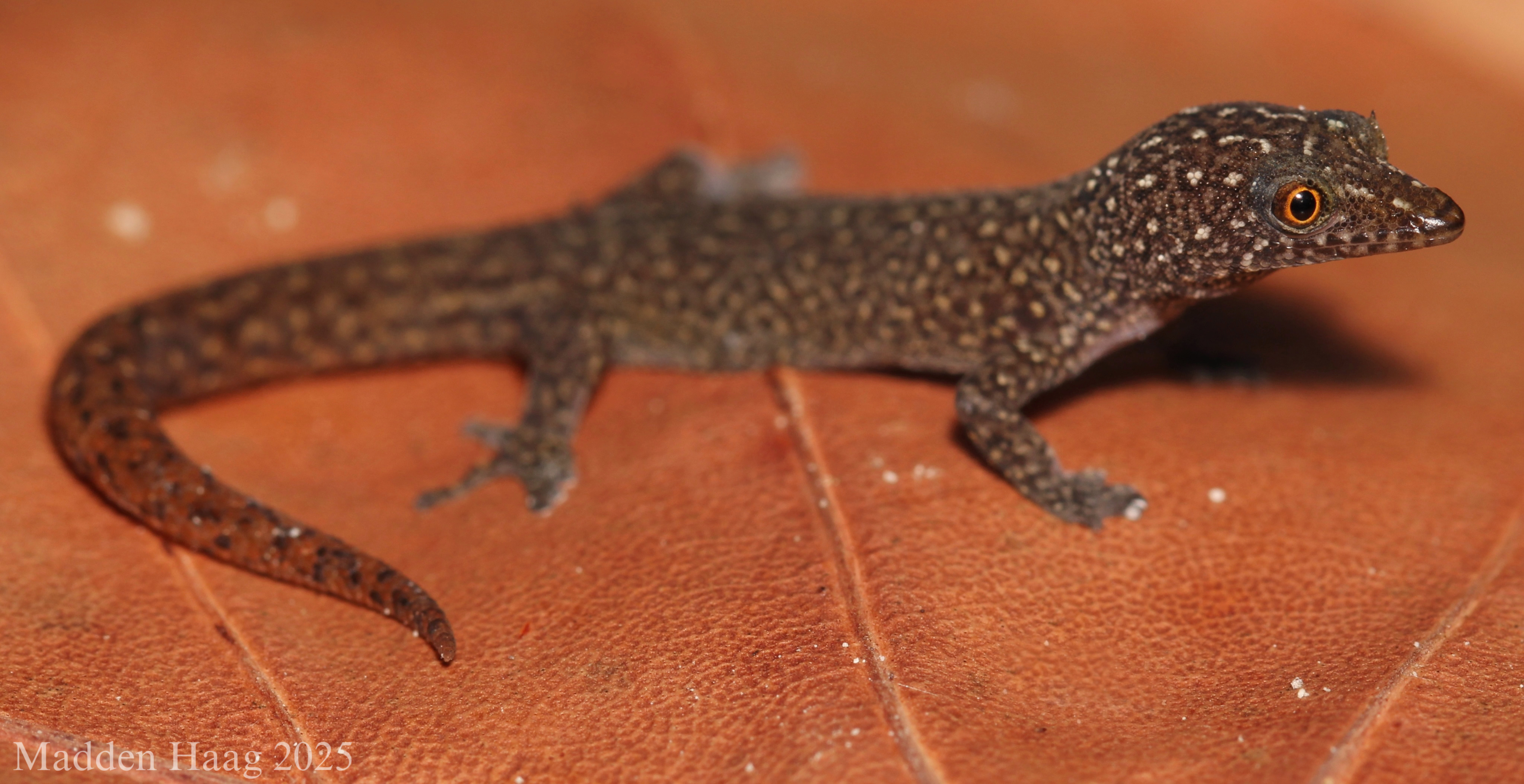
- Ocellated gecko (Sphaerodactylus argus)

Conservation status
- Least Concern (IUCN 3.1)

Scientific classification
- Kingdom: Animalia
- Phylum: Chordata
- Class: Reptilia
- Order: Squamata
- Suborder: Gekkota
- Family: Sphaerodactylidae
- Genus: Sphaerodactylus
- Species: S. argus

Binomial name
- Sphaerodactylus argus Gosse, 1850

= Sphaerodactylus argus =

Species of reptile

Sphaerodactylus argus, also known commonly as the ocellated gecko, the ocellated sphaero, and the stippled sphaero, is a species of lizard in the family Sphaerodactylidae native to the Caribbean and surrounding regions. There are two recognized subspecies.

== Etymology ==
The specific name, argus, refers to Argus, the many-eyed giant in Greek mythology, an allusion to the ocelli (eye spots) of this species.

== Geographic range ==
S. argus is found in Jamaica, Cuba and on adjacent islets, The Bahamas, San Andres and Providencia in Colombia and in the Yucatán Peninsula of Mexico. S. argus can also be found in the Florida Keys, where it has well-established populations, though introduced.

== Habitat ==
The preferred natural habitat of S. argus is forest, at altitudes from sea level to 100 m (330 ft). A climbing species, it can also be seen on walls and in buildings.

== Diet ==
S. argus feeds on insects and other small invertebrates.

== Reproduction ==
S. argus is oviparous.

== Subspecies ==
Two subspecies are recognized as being valid, including the nominate subspecies.

- S. a. argus Gosse, 1850
- S. a. andresensis Dunn & Saxe, 1950
