= Haitian least gecko =

Conservation status
- Endangered (IUCN 3.1)

Scientific classification
- Domain: Eukaryota
- Kingdom: Animalia
- Phylum: Chordata
- Class: Reptilia
- Order: Squamata
- Infraorder: Gekkota
- Family: Sphaerodactylidae
- Genus: Sphaerodactylus
- Species: S. asterulus

Binomial name
- Sphaerodactylus asterulus Schwartz & Graham, 1980

Species of lizard

The Haitian least gecko (Sphaerodactylus asterulus) is a species of lizard in the family Sphaerodactylidae . It is endemic to Haiti.
