= Sphaerodactylus armasi =

Conservation status
- Endangered (IUCN 3.1)

Scientific classification
- Kingdom: Animalia
- Phylum: Chordata
- Class: Reptilia
- Order: Squamata
- Suborder: Gekkota
- Family: Sphaerodactylidae
- Genus: Sphaerodactylus
- Species: S. armasi

Binomial name
- Sphaerodactylus armasi Schwartz & Garrido, 1974

Species of lizard

Sphaerodactylus armasi, also known commonly as the Guantanamo coastal gecko or the Guantanamo least gecko, is a species of lizard in the family Sphaerodactylidae. The species is endemic to Cuba.

== Etymology ==
The specific name, armasi, is in honor of Cuban zoologist Luis F. de Armas.

== Geographic range ==
S. armasi is found in Guantánamo Province in extreme southeastern Cuba.

== Habitat ==
The preferred natural habitat of S. armasi is dry forest, often with Agave.

== Reproduction ==
S. armasi is oviparous.
