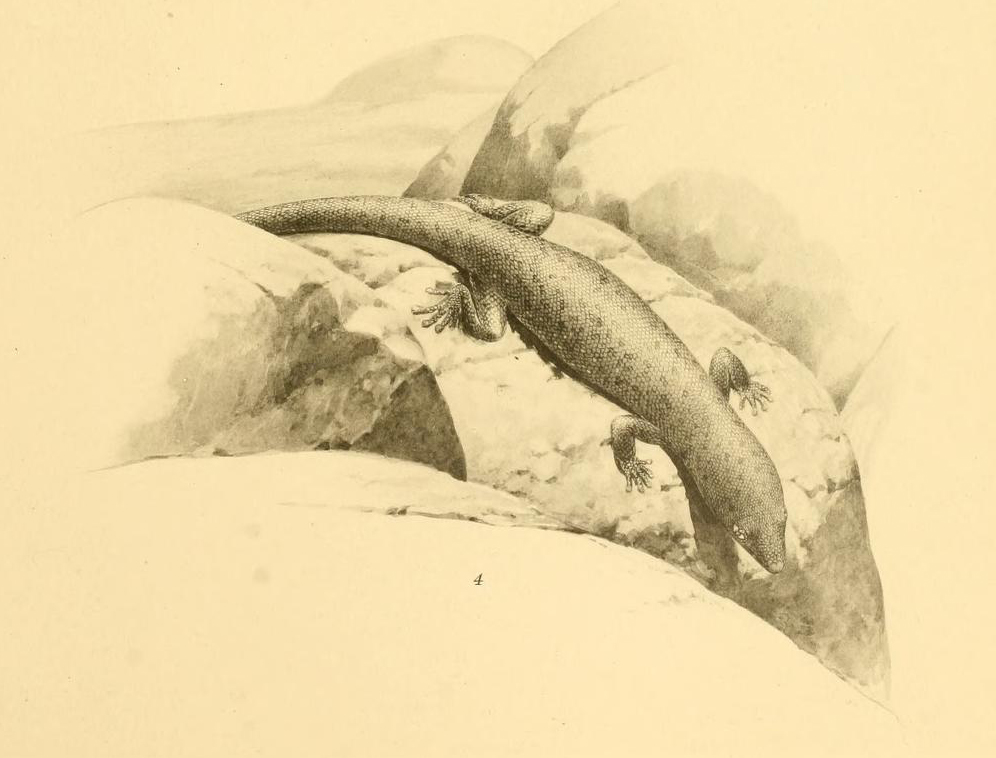
- Drawing of Sphaerodactylus corticola by E.N. Fischer from Barbour, 1921

Conservation status
- Least Concern (IUCN 3.1)

Scientific classification
- Kingdom: Animalia
- Phylum: Chordata
- Class: Reptilia
- Order: Squamata
- Suborder: Gekkota
- Family: Sphaerodactylidae
- Genus: Sphaerodactylus
- Species: S. corticola

Binomial name
- Sphaerodactylus corticola Garman, 1888

Synonyms
- Sphaerodactylus corticolus Garman, 1888; Sphaerodactylus corticola — Schwartz, 1968

= Sphaerodactylus corticola =

Species of lizard

Sphaerodactylus corticola, also known commonly as the central Bahamas sphaero or the Rum Cay least gecko, is a species of lizard in the family Sphaerodactylidae. The species is endemic to the Bahamas.

== Reproduction ==
S. corticola is oviparous.

== Subspecies ==
Four subspecies are recognized as being valid, including the nominotypical subspecies.

- Sphaerodactylus corticola aporrox Schwartz, 1968
- Sphaerodactylus corticola campter Schwartz, 1968
- Sphaerodactylus corticola corticola Garman, 1888
- Sphaerodactylus corticola soter Schwartz, 1968
