= Sphaerodactylus inaguae =

Conservation status
- Endangered (IUCN 3.1)

Scientific classification
- Kingdom: Animalia
- Phylum: Chordata
- Class: Reptilia
- Order: Squamata
- Suborder: Gekkota
- Family: Sphaerodactylidae
- Genus: Sphaerodactylus
- Species: S. inaguae

Binomial name
- Sphaerodactylus inaguae Noble, 1932

Species of lizard

Sphaerodactylus inaguae, also known as the Inagua sphaero or Inagua least gecko, is a species of lizard in the family Sphaerodactylidae. It is endemic to The Bahamas, where it is found on Great Inagua and Sheep Island. It inhabits coastal forests and human settlements. It reproduces by laying eggs, making communal nests with 2–13 eggs in plants such as Casuarina equisetifolia. It is classified by the IUCN as being endangered due to its extremely small range and the threat of both ongoing habitat degradation and introduced mammals.

== Taxonomy ==
Sphaerodactylus inaguae was formally described in 1932 by the American zoologist Gladwyn Kingsley Noble based on an adult male specimen collected from Mathew Town on Great Inagua in The Bahamas. It is named after the island on which it was discovered. It has the common names Inagua sphaero and Inagua least gecko.

== Description ==
Sphaerodactylus inaguae has a pale grayish-brown back with numerous dark brown spots and a white underside.

== Distribution and ecology ==
Sphaerodactylus inaguae is endemic to The Bahamas, where it is found on Great Inagua and Sheep Island. It traditionally inhabits coastal forests, but can also be seen in human settlements.

Sphaerodactylus inaguae reproduces by laying eggs. It has been observed nesting communally in Casuarina equisetifolia plants in arid coastal shrublands, only a few dozen metres from the shore. Eggs were laid in clumps of old branchlets accumulating 0.5–1.2 m above the ground at forks in branches. Each nest had 2–13 eggs, with the hard-shelled eggs being 7.2×5.3 mm in dimensions.

== Conservation ==
Sphaerodactylus inaguae is classified by the IUCN as being endangered. Found only on one island, it has an extremely small range and is threatened by both ongoing habitat degradation and introduced mammals. It has survived alongside introduced predators such as rats and cats for centuries. It is also tolerant of urbanized habitats and can be seen in human settlements. However, the combination of these two factors over a long period of time has probably reduced the gecko's population density below normal levels, a population decline that is thought to be ongoing. The gecko is known from two protected areas.
