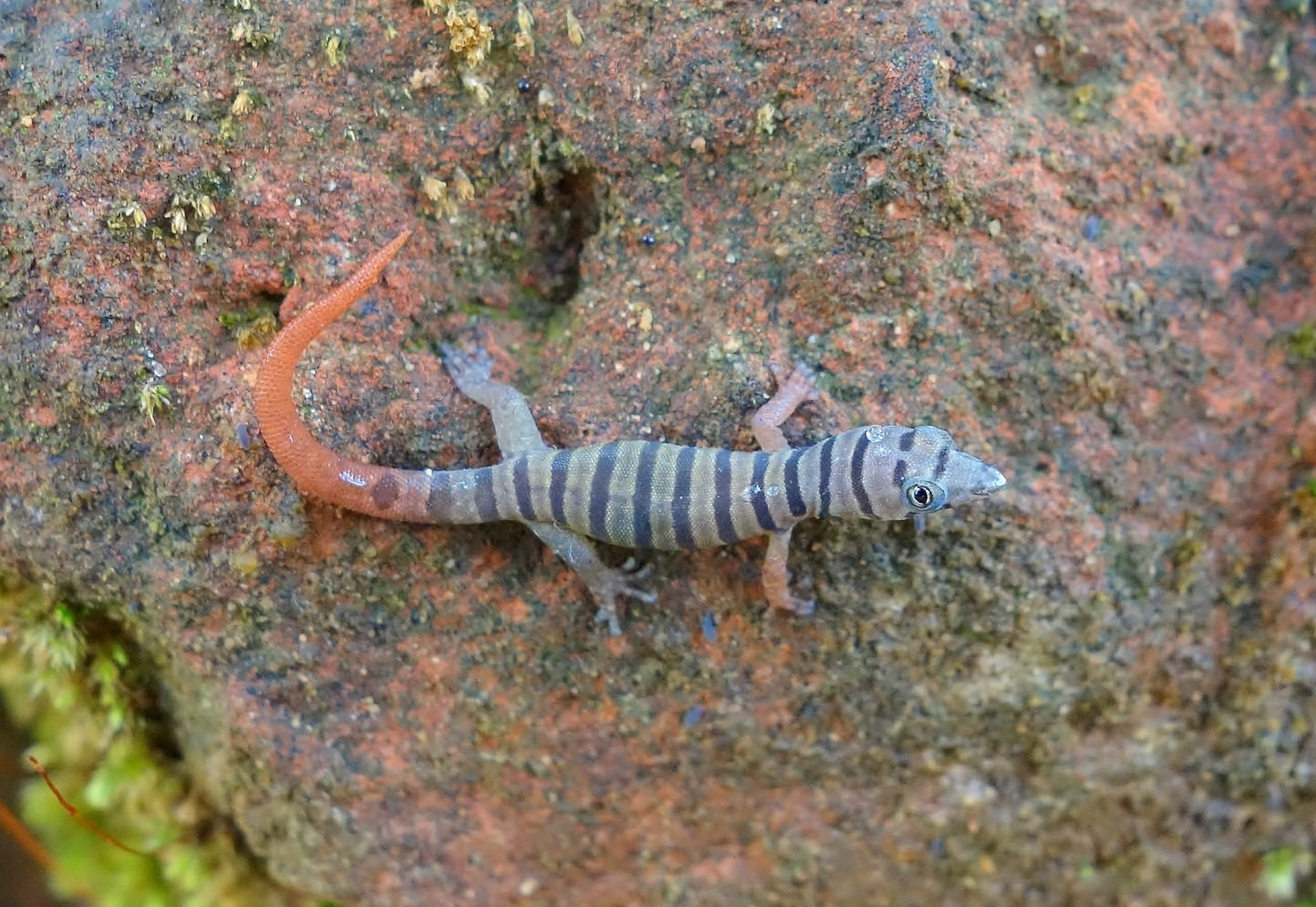

Conservation status
- Least Concern (IUCN 3.1)

Scientific classification
- Kingdom: Animalia
- Phylum: Chordata
- Class: Reptilia
- Order: Squamata
- Suborder: Gekkota
- Family: Sphaerodactylidae
- Genus: Sphaerodactylus
- Species: S. elegans

Binomial name
- Sphaerodactylus elegans (Macleay, 1834)

= Ashy gecko =

Species of reptile

The ashy gecko (Sphaerodactylus elegans) is a species of gecko native to Cuba (including Isla de la Juventud) and Hispaniola (Haiti, including Gonâve Island and Les Cayemites, and the Dominican Republic). It is a small species, dark in color with many white spots. It is also a good climber. Ashy geckos have been introduced to a few small islands in southernmost Florida, and have established populations there.

== Taxonomy ==
There are two subspecies of S. elegans:

- Sphaerodactylus elegans elegans Macleay, 1834 — Cuba, introduced to small area of southernmost Florida
- Sphaerodactylus elegans punctatissimus Duméril and Bibron, 1836 — Hispaniola (Haiti and Dominican Republic), including some satellite islands

S. elegans elegans is the subspecies native to Cuba including Isla de la Juventud, the archipelagos of Canarreos and Jardines de la Reina, and throughout the length of the Sabana-Camagüey Archipelago.

== Description ==
S. elegans elegans is small. S. elegans elegans has granular scales. Its snout has a maximum length of 39 millimeters. Its colors range from a red tail to a blue tail, with a green midsection, and always with thin horizontal bands of black across its body. Its limbs are a variously colored and seem almost opaque in comparison to the rest of the body. There are no color differences between male and females in this subspecies. The other subspecies, S. elegans punctatissimus, is more muted and earthy in tone, overall less vibrant, with more of a spotted pattern.

== In Florida ==
The first observation of the species in Florida occurred in 1922 when it was introduced from somewhere in the West Indies excluding The Bahamas. Prior to 1930 species from the West Indies migrated to nearby islands through the means of cargo shipments. This mechanism is the most probable means of the immigration for S. elegans elegans to Monroe County, specifically the lower Florida Keys. The subspecies has not travelled far since 1922. Still found in the lower Keys, this species has had a century to migrate north but has been limited by geographic barriers. Although many of the lower Keys are connected by bridges used for vehicular traffic, and the Seven Mile Bridge connects Big Pine Key and Bahia Honda Key to Marathon Key, this is apparently not a viable route for this tiny, tropical species. S. elegans elegans is one of only twelve of over five hundred species of reptiles and amphibians from the West Indies to colonize south Florida. The proximity of the origin of the species is an important factor in its immigration to the lower Keys.
