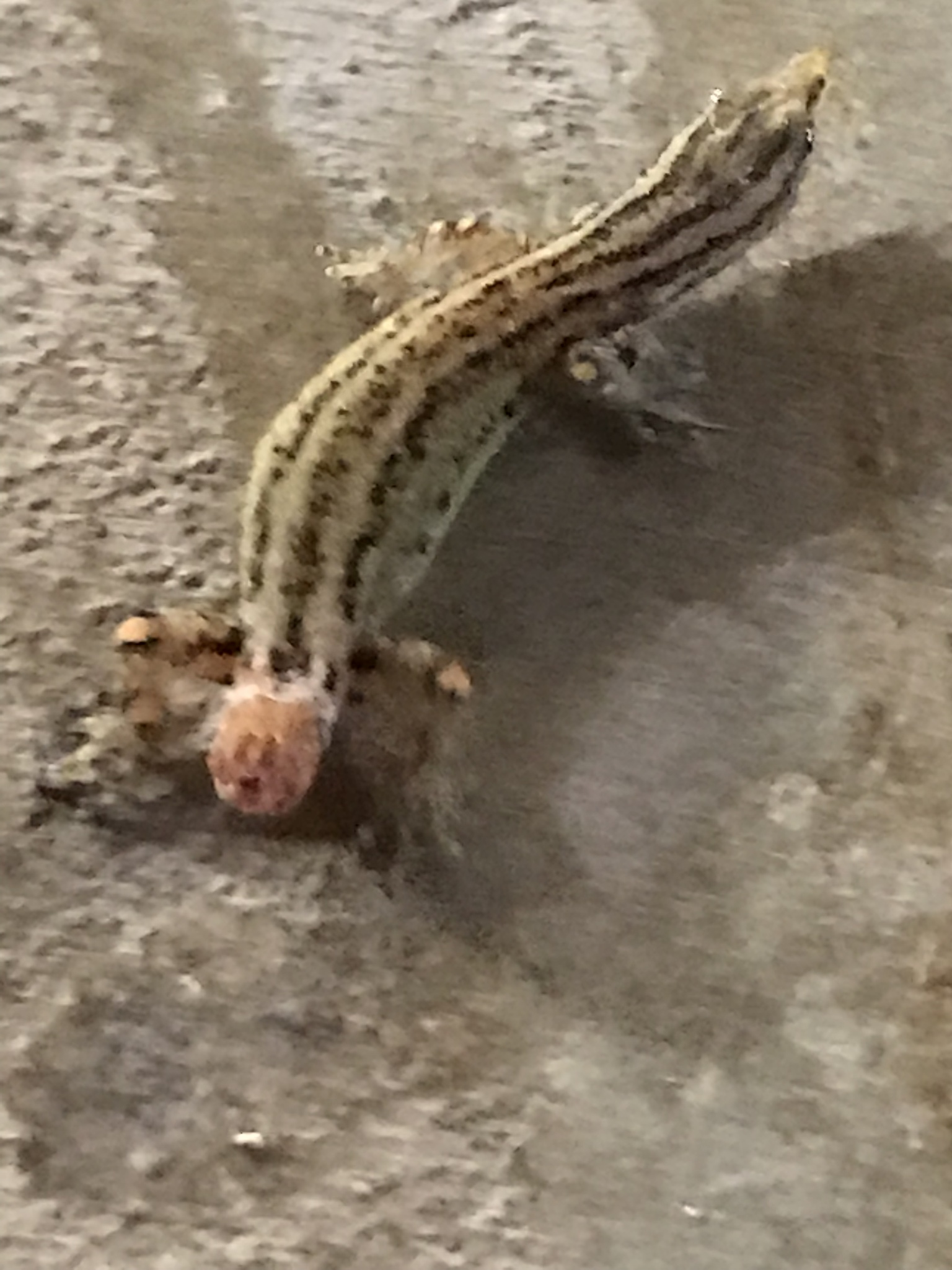

Conservation status
- Least Concern (IUCN 3.1)

Scientific classification
- Kingdom: Animalia
- Phylum: Chordata
- Class: Reptilia
- Order: Squamata
- Suborder: Gekkota
- Family: Sphaerodactylidae
- Genus: Sphaerodactylus
- Species: S. graptolaemus

Binomial name
- Sphaerodactylus graptolaemus Harris & Kluge, 1984

= Costa Rica least gecko =

Species of lizard

The Costa Rica least gecko (Sphaerodactylus graptolaemus) is a species of lizard in the family Sphaerodactylidae. It is endemic to Costa Rica and Panama.
