= Cap-Haitien least gecko =

Conservation status
- Critically endangered, possibly extinct (IUCN 3.1)

Scientific classification
- Kingdom: Animalia
- Phylum: Chordata
- Class: Reptilia
- Order: Squamata
- Suborder: Gekkota
- Family: Sphaerodactylidae
- Genus: Sphaerodactylus
- Species: S. lazelli

Binomial name
- Sphaerodactylus lazelli Shreve, 1968

Species of lizard

The Cap-Haitien least gecko (Sphaerodactylus lazelli) is a species of lizard in the family Sphaerodactylidae. The species is endemic to Haiti.

== Etymology ==
The specific name, lazelli, is in honor of American herpetologist James Draper "Skip" Lazell, Jr. (born 1939).

== Habitat ==
The preferred habitat of S. lazelli is forest at sea level.

== Description ==
The holotype of S. lazelli has a snout-to-vent length (SVL) of 31 mm (1.2 in).

== Reproduction ==
S. lazelli is oviparous.
