= TerreNueve least gecko =

Terre-Neuve least gecko

Conservation status
- Critically Endangered (IUCN 3.1)

Scientific classification
- Kingdom: Animalia
- Phylum: Chordata
- Class: Reptilia
- Order: Squamata
- Suborder: Gekkota
- Family: Sphaerodactylidae
- Genus: Sphaerodactylus
- Species: S. sommeri

Binomial name
- Sphaerodactylus sommeri Graham, 1981

Species of lizard

The Terre-Neuve least gecko (Sphaerodactylus sommeri), also known commonly as the northwest Haitian banded geckolet, is a species of lizard in the family Sphaerodactylidae. The species is endemic to Haiti.

== Etymology ==
The specific name, sommeri, is in honor of American entomologist William W. Sommer.

== Habitat ==
The preferred habitat of S. sommeri is forest at altitudes of 0–680 m (0–2,231 ft).

== Description ==
The maximum recorded snout-to-vent length (SVL) of S. sommeri is 3.5 cm (1.4 in) for females and 3.0 cm (1.2 in) for males.

== Reproduction ==
S. sommeri is oviparous.
