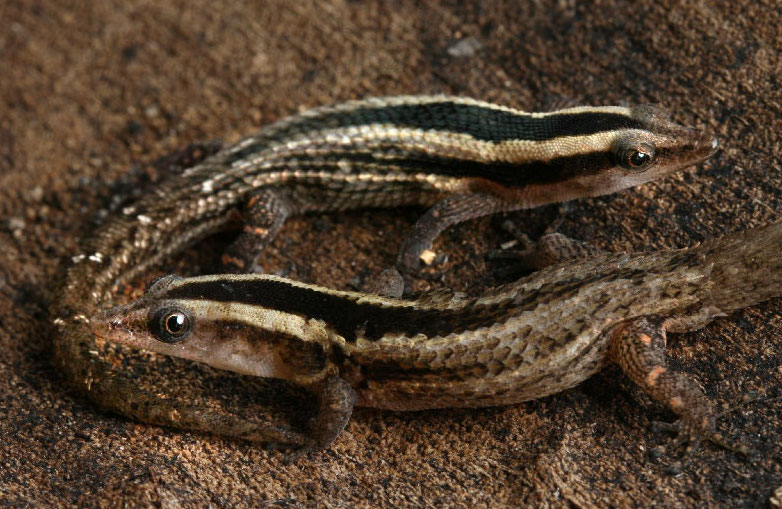

Conservation status
- Critically Endangered (IUCN 3.1)

Scientific classification
- Kingdom: Animalia
- Phylum: Chordata
- Class: Reptilia
- Order: Squamata
- Suborder: Gekkota
- Family: Sphaerodactylidae
- Genus: Sphaerodactylus
- Species: S. cochranae

Binomial name
- Sphaerodactylus cochranae Ruibal, 1946
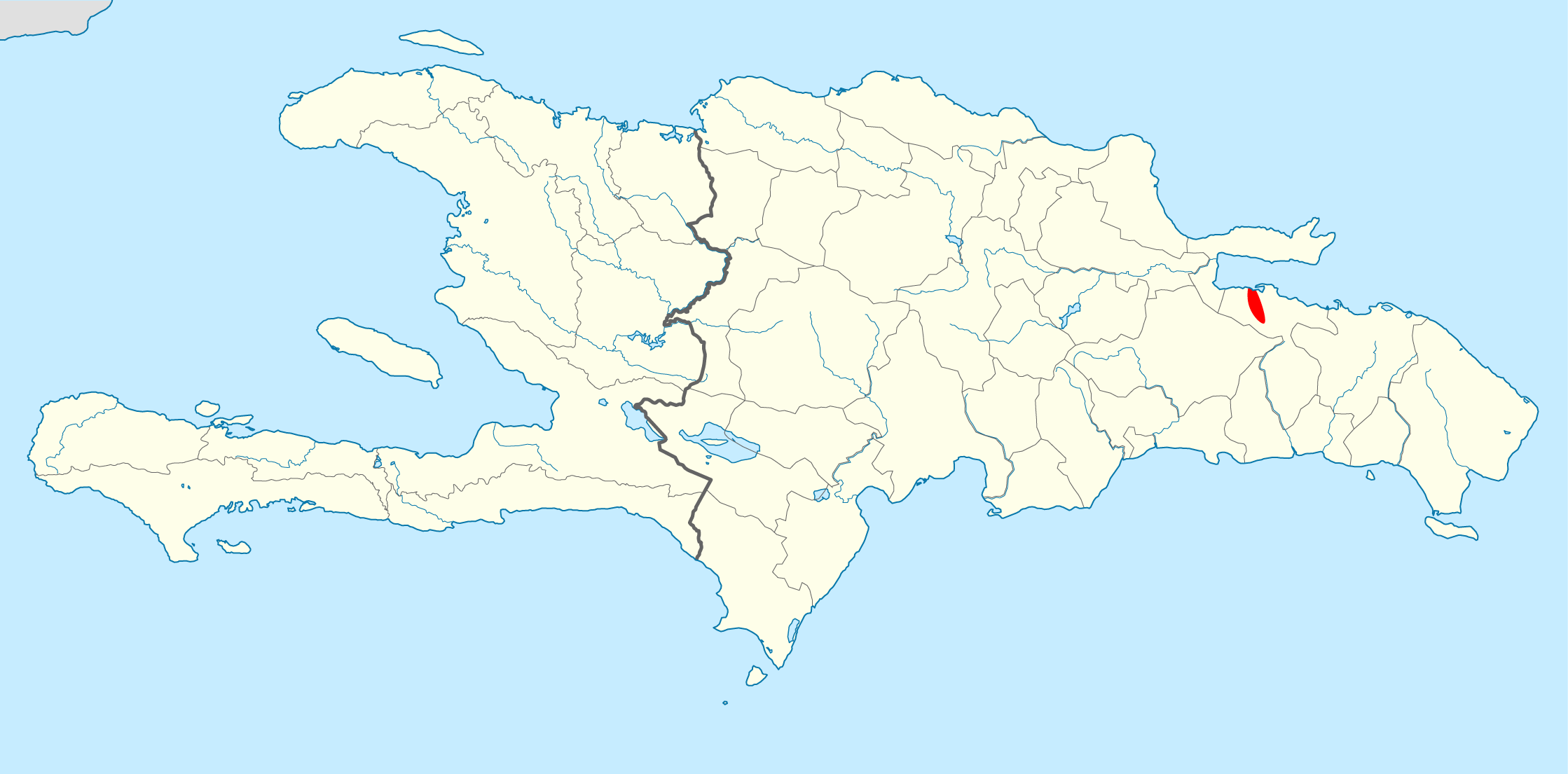
- Distribution of Sphaerodactylus cochranae. Inferred range in red.

= Cochran's least gecko =

Species of lizard

Sphaerodactylus cochranae, commonly known as Cochran's least gecko, is a critically endangered species of lizard in the family Sphaerodactylidae. It is endemic to Hispaniola, specifically found within the Los Haitises National Park and adjacent karst regions in the Dominican Republic.

== Description ==
Sphaerodactylus cochranae is a small gecko, with adult males reaching a maximum snout-vent length (SVL) of 30 mm and females up to 28 mm. The species is characterized by its distinctive dorsal scales, which are large, acute, strongly keeled, and imbricate, numbering 20–23 from axilla to groin. The dorsal coloration is not sexually dichromatic, featuring a yellowish-brown to tan ground color with three dark-brown to black longitudinal stripes extending onto the tail. Ventral scales are smooth and cycloid, contributing to its unique appearance among its congeners.

== Etymology ==
The species is named in honor of Doris Mable Cochran, a distinguished American herpetologist and curator at the National Museum of Natural History, recognizing her contributions to the study of Hispaniolan herpetofauna.

== Distribution and habitat ==
Sphaerodactylus cochranae is exclusively found in the karstic Los Haitises region south of the Bahía de Samaná, thriving in mesic environments closely associated with bromeliads. Its habitat is characterized by steep mogotes (karstic hilltops) that have remained largely undisturbed by human activity, which is crucial for the survival of this gecko. The species' range is highly restricted, covering less than 71 km^{2} (27 sq mi).

== Ecology ==
Little is known about the natural history of S. cochranae, but it is believed to be a bromeliad dweller, exceedingly sensitive to changes in its habitat, particularly those caused by agricultural expansion. The species' reliance on specific microhabitats within its limited range underscores its vulnerability to environmental disturbances.

== Conservation ==
Listed as Critically Endangered by the IUCN Red List, S. cochranae faces significant threats from habitat loss due to agricultural expansion. Despite a portion of its habitat being protected within the Los Haitises National Park, enforcement and boundary demarcation issues have led to continued deforestation and habitat degradation within the park. Conservation efforts are urgently needed to protect this species and its habitat.
