= Sphaerodactylus poindexteri =

Scientific classification
- Kingdom: Animalia
- Phylum: Chordata
- Class: Reptilia
- Order: Squamata
- Suborder: Gekkota
- Family: Sphaerodactylidae
- Genus: Sphaerodactylus
- Species: S. poindexteri

Binomial name
- Sphaerodactylus poindexteri McCranie & Hedges, 2013

Species of lizard

Sphaerodactylus poindexteri is a small species of gecko, a lizard in the family Sphaerodactylidae. The species is endemic to Útila, one of the Bay Islands of Honduras.

== Etymology ==
The specific name, poindexteri, is in honor of James A. Poindexter of the USNM Support Center in Suitland, Maryland.

== Habitat ==
The preferred habitat of S. poindexteri is leaf litter of Coccoloba uvifera and hardwood trees at altitudes of 3–10 m (9.8–32.8 ft).
