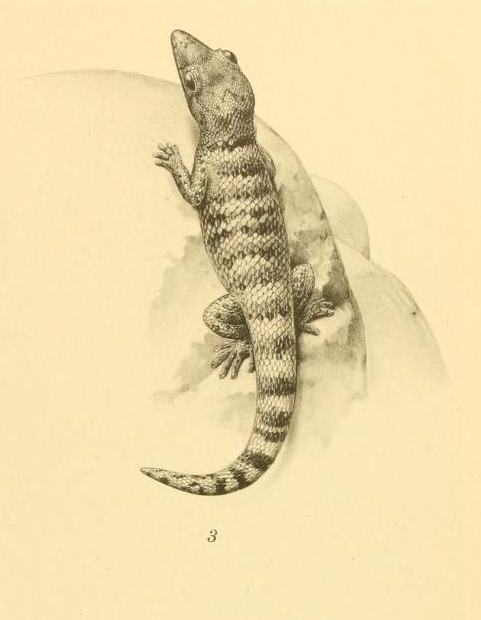
- S. richardsonii, drawing by E.N. Fischer, from Barbour, 1921

Conservation status
- Endangered (IUCN 3.1)

Scientific classification
- Kingdom: Animalia
- Phylum: Chordata
- Class: Reptilia
- Order: Squamata
- Suborder: Gekkota
- Family: Sphaerodactylidae
- Genus: Sphaerodactylus
- Species: S. richardsonii

Binomial name
- Sphaerodactylus richardsonii Gray, 1845

= Sphaerodactylus richardsonii =

Species of lizard

Sphaerodactylus richardsonii, also known commonly as Richardson's least gecko or the northern Jamaica banded sphaero, is a small species of lizard in the family Sphaerodactylidae. The species is endemic to Jamaica.

== Etymology ==
The specific name, richardsonii, is in honor of Scottish naturalist John Richardson.

The subspecific name, gossei, is in honor of English naturalist Philip Henry Gosse.

== Subspecies ==
Two subspecies are recognized as being valid, including the nominotypical subspecies.

- Sphaerodactylus richardsonii gossei Grant, 1939
- Sphaerodactylus richardsonii richardsonii Gray, 1845

== Habitat ==
The preferred habitats of S. richardsonii are forest and shrubland.

== Description ==
For its genus, S. richardson is stockily-built and long. Adults may attain a snout-to-vent length (SVL) of 4 cm (1.6 in) and a tail length of 3.5 cm (1.4 in). All the dorsal scales are large, keeled, and imbricate (overlapping). There is no middorsal granular row.

== Reproduction ==
S. richardsonii is oviparous.
