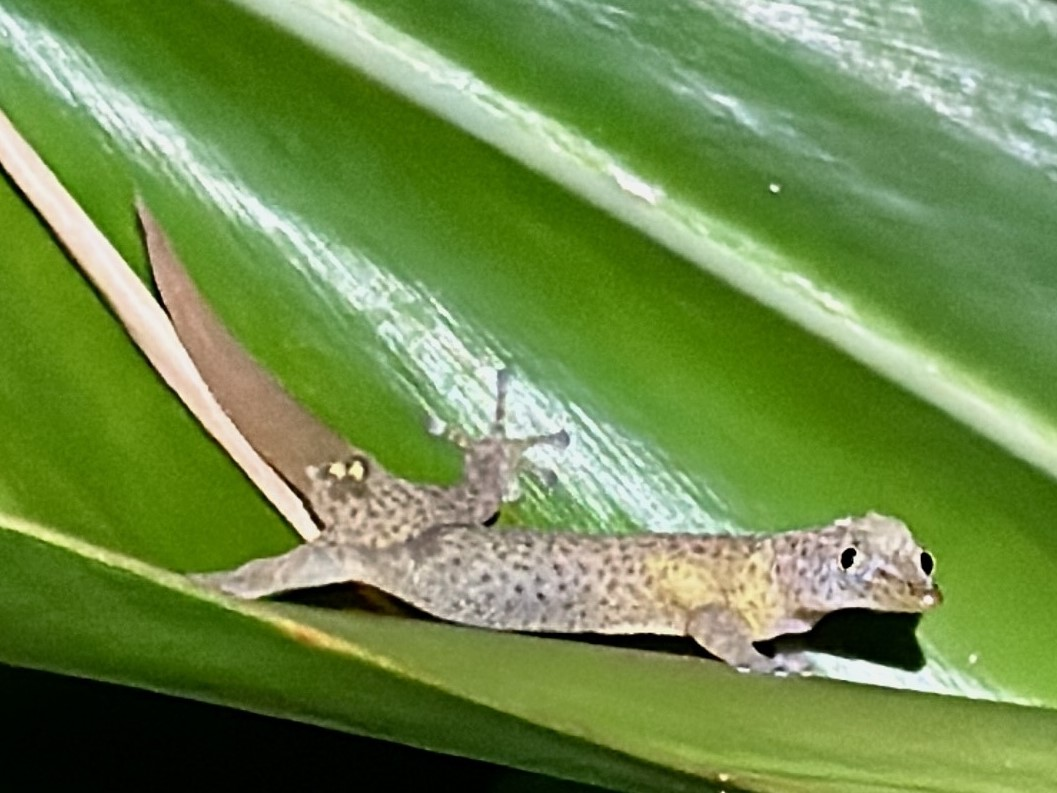

Conservation status
- Endangered (IUCN 3.1)

Scientific classification
- Kingdom: Animalia
- Phylum: Chordata
- Class: Reptilia
- Order: Squamata
- Suborder: Gekkota
- Family: Sphaerodactylidae
- Genus: Sphaerodactylus
- Species: S. dacnicolor

Binomial name
- Sphaerodactylus dacnicolor Barbour, 1910

= Sphaerodactylus dacnicolor =

Species of lizard

Sphaerodactylus dacnicolor, also known as the Jamaican tailspot sphaero or eastern Jamaican sharpnosed sphaero, is a species of lizard in the family Sphaerodactylidae. It is endemic to Jamaica.
