= Caribbean least gecko =

Conservation status
- Least Concern (IUCN 3.1)

Scientific classification
- Kingdom: Animalia
- Phylum: Chordata
- Class: Reptilia
- Order: Squamata
- Suborder: Gekkota
- Family: Sphaerodactylidae
- Genus: Sphaerodactylus
- Species: S. homolepis

Binomial name
- Sphaerodactylus homolepis Cope, 1886

Species of lizard

The Caribbean least gecko (Sphaerodactylus homolepis) is a species of lizard in the family Sphaerodactylidae. It is endemic to Nicaragua, Costa Rica, and Panama.
