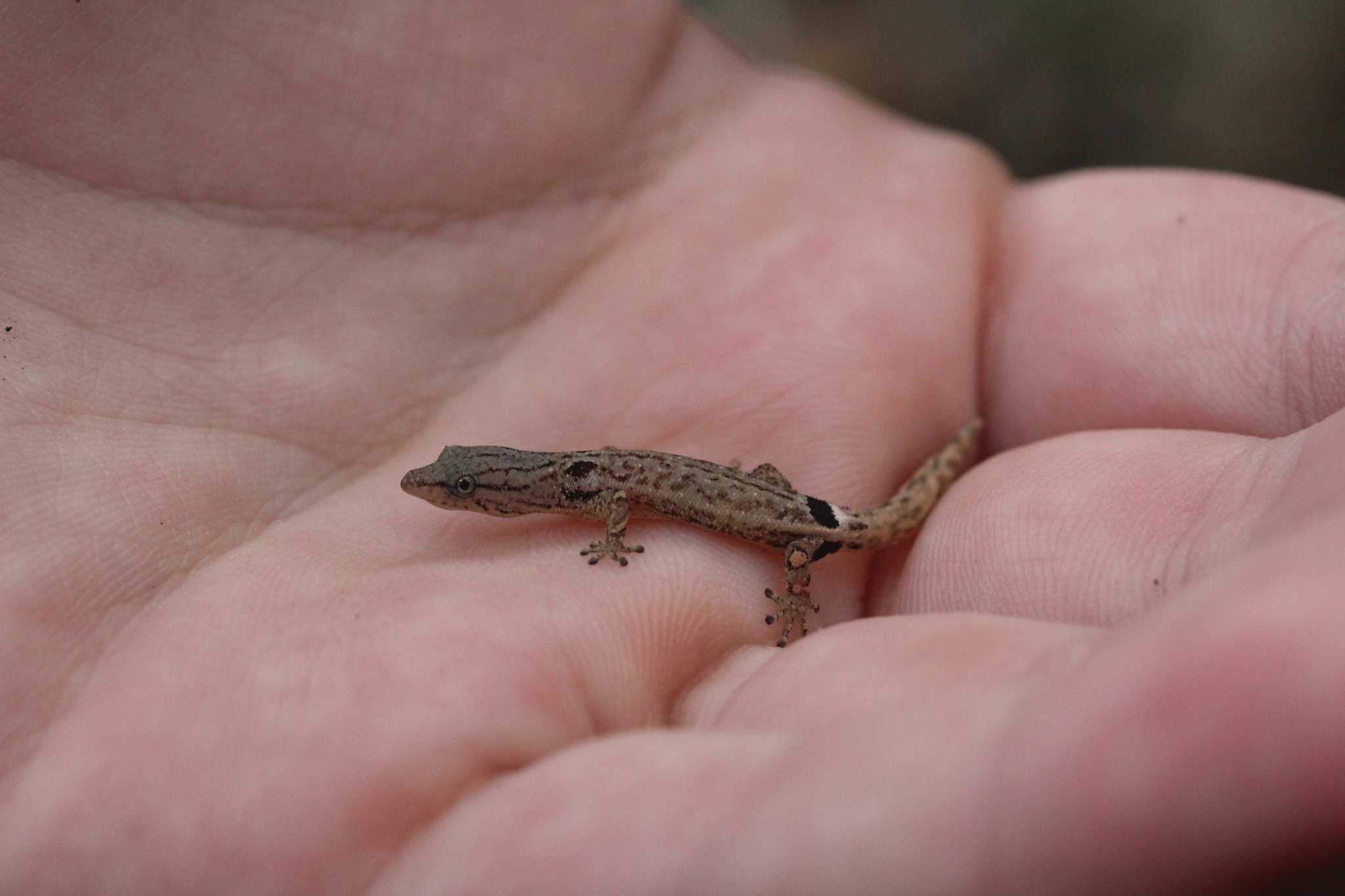
- Sphaerodactylus millepunctatus on a human hand

Conservation status
- Least Concern (IUCN 3.1)

Scientific classification
- Kingdom: Animalia
- Phylum: Chordata
- Class: Reptilia
- Order: Squamata
- Suborder: Gekkota
- Family: Sphaerodactylidae
- Genus: Sphaerodactylus
- Species: S. millepunctatus

Binomial name
- Sphaerodactylus millepunctatus Hallowell, 1861

= Spotted least gecko =

Species of lizard

The spotted least gecko (Sphaerodactylus millepunctatus) is a species of lizard in the family Sphaerodactylidae. It is endemic to Central America.
