= Ramsden's least gecko =

Conservation status
- Least Concern (IUCN 3.1)

Scientific classification
- Kingdom: Animalia
- Phylum: Chordata
- Class: Reptilia
- Order: Squamata
- Suborder: Gekkota
- Family: Sphaerodactylidae
- Genus: Sphaerodactylus
- Species: S. ramsdeni

Binomial name
- Sphaerodactylus ramsdeni Ruibal, 1959

Species of lizard

Ramsden's least gecko (Sphaerodactylus ramsdeni) is a species of lizard in the family Sphaerodactylidae. The species is endemic to Cuba.

== Etymology ==
The specific name, ramsdeni, is in honor of herpetologist Charles Theodore Ramsden (1876–1951), who collected the holotype in 1914.

== Habitat ==
The preferred habitat of S. ramsdeni is forest.

== Description ==
S. ramsdeni has a very large rostral which is bordered posteriorly by six scales. The scales between the orbits are smooth. The dorsal scales are small. The ventrals are smooth. The posterior margin of each caudal is convex.

== Reproduction ==
S. ramsdeni is oviparous.
