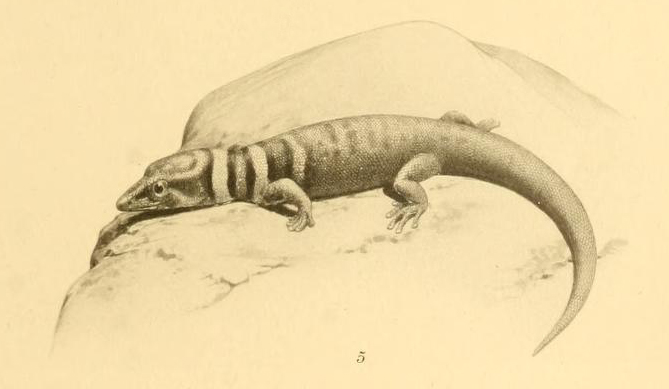

Conservation status
- Endangered (IUCN 3.1)

Scientific classification
- Kingdom: Animalia
- Phylum: Chordata
- Class: Reptilia
- Order: Squamata
- Suborder: Gekkota
- Family: Sphaerodactylidae
- Genus: Sphaerodactylus
- Species: S. intermedius

Binomial name
- Sphaerodactylus intermedius Barbour & Ramsden, 1919

= Mantanzas least gecko =

Species of lizard

The Mantanzas least gecko (Sphaerodactylus intermedius) is a species of lizard in the family Sphaerodactylidae. It is endemic to Cuba.
