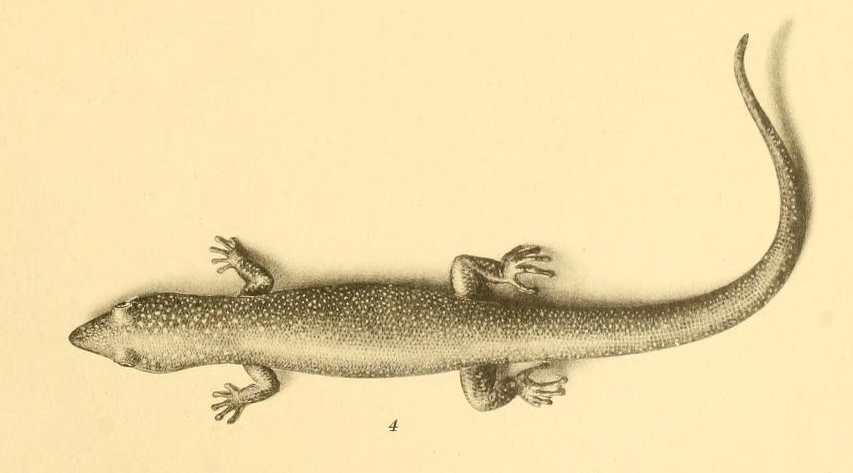

Conservation status
- Vulnerable (IUCN 3.1)

Scientific classification
- Kingdom: Animalia
- Phylum: Chordata
- Class: Reptilia
- Order: Squamata
- Suborder: Gekkota
- Family: Sphaerodactylidae
- Genus: Sphaerodactylus
- Species: S. cinereus

Binomial name
- Sphaerodactylus cinereus Wagler, 1830

= Gray gecko =

Species of lizard

The gray gecko (Sphaerodactylus cinereus) is a species of lizard in the family Sphaerodactylidae . It is endemic to Haiti.
