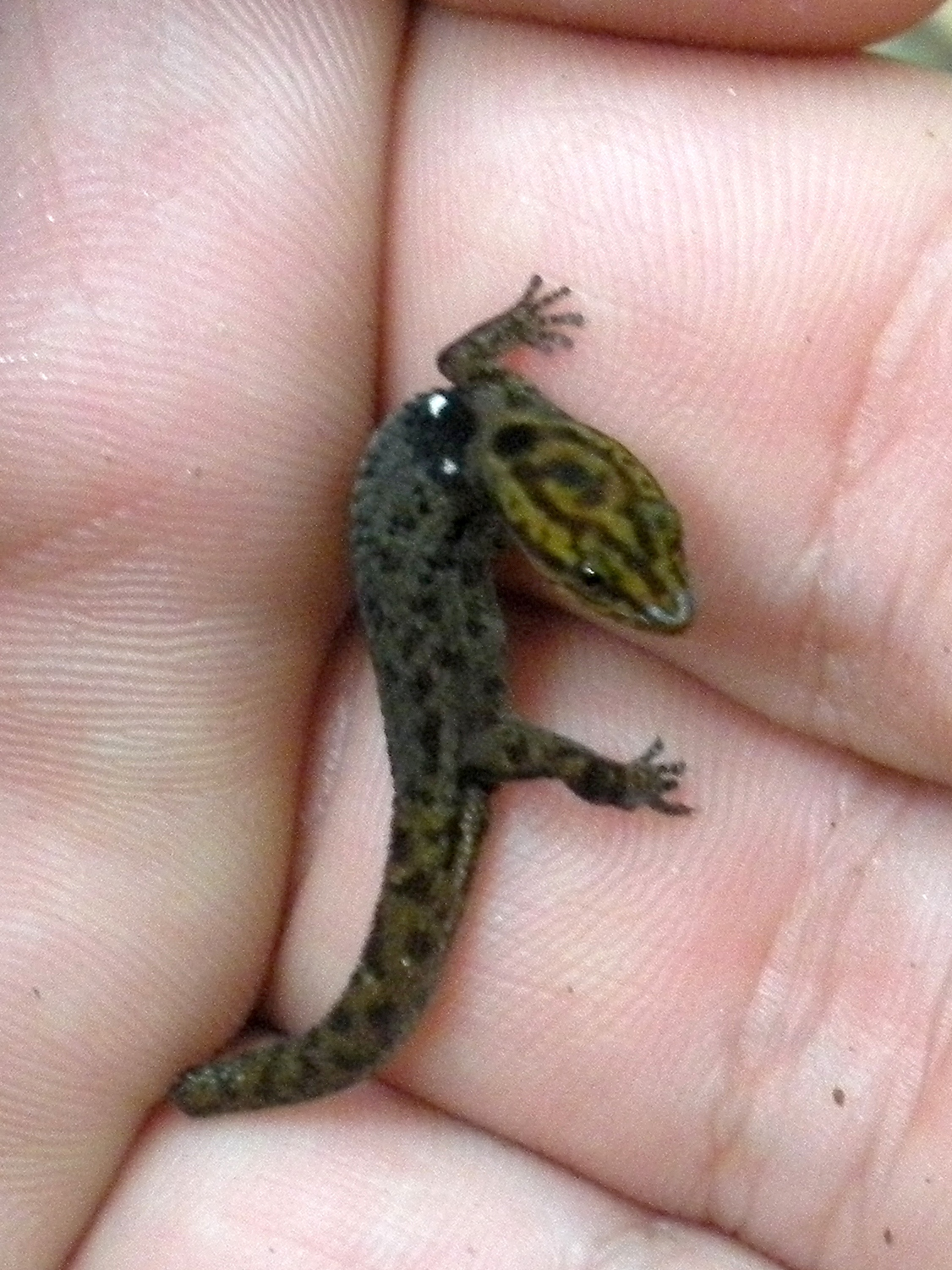
- Sphaerodactylus macrolepis

Scientific classification
- Kingdom: Animalia
- Phylum: Chordata
- Class: Reptilia
- Order: Squamata
- Suborder: Gekkota
- Family: Sphaerodactylidae
- Genus: Sphaerodactylus; Wagler, 1830

= Sphaerodactylus =

Genus of lizards

Sphaerodactylus is a genus of geckos from the Americas that are distinguished from other Gekkota by their small size, by their round, rather than vertical, eye pupils, and by each digit terminating in a single, round adhesive pad or scale, from which their name (Sphaero = round, dactylus = finger) is derived. All species in this genus are rather small, but two species, S. ariasae and S. parthenopion, are tiny, and – with a snout-vent length of about 1.6 cm (0.63 in) – the smallest reptiles in the world.

== Fossil record ==
Fossil remains referred to Sphaerodactylus have been recovered from Dominican amber.

== Species ==
The following 108 species are recognized as being valid.

- Sphaerodactylus alphus McCranie & Hedges, 2013 - Guanaja large-scaled geckolet
- Sphaerodactylus altavelensis Noble, 1933 - Alto Velo least gecko, Alto Velo sphaero
- Sphaerodactylus argivus Garman, 1888 - Cayman least gecko
- Sphaerodactylus argus Gosse, 1850 - ocellated gecko, ocellated sphaero, stippled sphaero
- Sphaerodactylus ariasae Hedges & Thomas, 2001 - Jaragua sphaero, Jaragua dwarf gecko
- Sphaerodactylus armasi Schwartz & Garrido, 1974 - Guantanamo least gecko, Guantanamo coastal gecko
- Sphaerodactylus armstrongi Noble, 1933 - Armstrong's least gecko, southern forest geckolet
- Sphaerodactylus asterulus Schwartz & Graham, 1980 - Haitian least gecko
- Sphaerodactylus beattyi Grant, 1937 - Saint Croix's sphaero, Beatty's least gecko
- Sphaerodactylus becki Schmidt, 1919 - Beck's least gecko
- Sphaerodactylus bromeliarum G. Peters & Schwartz, 1977 - El Yunque least gecko
- Sphaerodactylus caicosensis Cochran, 1934 - Caicos banded sphaero, Caicos least gecko
- Sphaerodactylus callocricus Schwartz, 1976 - rough-banded sphaero, callous least gecko
- Sphaerodactylus celicara Garrido & Schwartz, 1982 - Baracoan eyespot sphaero
- Sphaerodactylus cinereus Wagler, 1830 - gray gecko
- Sphaerodactylus clenchi Shreve, 1968 - peninsula least gecko
- Sphaerodactylus cochranae Ruibal, 1946 - Cochran's least gecko
- Sphaerodactylus continentalis F. Werner, 1896 - upper Central American geckolet
- Sphaerodactylus copei Steindachner, 1867 - Cope's least gecko
- Sphaerodactylus corticola Garman, 1888 - central Bahamas sphaero, Rum Cay least gecko
- Sphaerodactylus cricoderus Thomas, Hedges & Garrido, 1992 - Turquino collared sphaero
- Sphaerodactylus cryphius Thomas & Schwartz, 1977 - Bakoruco least gecko
- Sphaerodactylus dacnicolor Barbour, 1910 - Jamaican tailspot sphaero, eastern Jamaican sharpnosed sphaero
- Sphaerodactylus darlingtoni Shreve, 1968 - Darlington's least gecko
- Sphaerodactylus difficilis Barbour, 1914 - Hispaniolan eyespot sphaero, difficult least gecko
- Sphaerodactylus dimorphicus Fong & Díaz, 2004 - Santiago de Cuba geckolet
- Sphaerodactylus docimus Schwartz & Garrido, 1985 - Cabo Cruz banded sphaero
- Sphaerodactylus dunni Schmidt, 1936 - Dunn's least gecko
- Sphaerodactylus elasmorhynchus Thomas, 1966 - Marche Leon least gecko, snout-shield sphaero
- Sphaerodactylus elegans Macleay, 1834 - ashy gecko
- Sphaerodactylus elegantulus Barbour, 1917 - Antigua least gecko
- Sphaerodactylus epiurus Thomas & Hedges, 1993 - Hispaniolan tailspot sphaero
- Sphaerodactylus exsul Barbour, 1914 - Swan Islands geckolet
- Sphaerodactylus fantasticus A.M.C. Duméril & Bibron, 1836 - fantastic least gecko
- Sphaerodactylus gaigeae Grant, 1932 -chevronated sphaero, Gaige's least gecko
- Sphaerodactylus gilvitorques Cope, 1862 - Jamaican collared sphaero, Jamaican least gecko
- Sphaerodactylus glaucus Cope, 1866 - collared dwarf gecko, least gecko
- Sphaerodactylus goniorhynchus Cope, 1895 - Jamaican forest sphaero, Cakoarita least gecko
- Sphaerodactylus grandisquamis Stejneger, 1904 - big-scaled least gecko, big-scaled dwarf gecko, cotton ginner
- Sphaerodactylus graptolaemus Harris & Kluge, 1984 - Costa Rica least gecko
- Sphaerodactylus guanajae McCranie & Hedges, 2012 - Guanaja head-spotted geckolet
- Sphaerodactylus heliconiae Harris, 1982
- Sphaerodactylus homolepis Cope, 1886 - Caribbean least gecko
- Sphaerodactylus inaguae Noble, 1932 - Inagua sphaero, Inagua least gecko
- Sphaerodactylus inigoi Thomas & Schwartz, 1966 - Isla Vieques dwarf gecko
- Sphaerodactylus intermedius Barbour & Ramsden, 1919 - Mantanzas least gecko
- Sphaerodactylus kirbyi Lazell, 1994 - Bequia dwarf gecko, Bequia sphaero, Grenadines sphaero
- Sphaerodactylus klauberi Grant, 1931 - Klauber's dwarf gecko, Klauber's least gecko, Puerto Rican highland sphaero
- Sphaerodactylus ladae Thomas & Hedges, 1988 - Martin Garcia least gecko
- Sphaerodactylus lazelli Shreve, 1968 - Cap-Haitien least gecko
- Sphaerodactylus leonardovaldesi McCranie & Hedges, 2012
- Sphaerodactylus leucaster Schwartz, 1973 - eastern least gecko
- Sphaerodactylus levinsi Heatwole, 1968 - Desecheo gecko, Isla Desecheo least gecko
- Sphaerodactylus lineolatus Lichtenstein & von Martens, 1856 - Panama least gecko
- Sphaerodactylus macrolepis Günther, 1859 - big-scaled least gecko, big-scaled dwarf gecko, cotton ginner
- Sphaerodactylus mariguanae Cochran, 1934 - southern Bahamas sphaero, Mayaguana least gecko
- Sphaerodactylus microlepis J.T. Reinhardt & Lütken, 1862 - little-scaled least gecko
- Sphaerodactylus micropithecus Schwartz, 1977 - Monito gecko
- Sphaerodactylus millepunctatus Hallowell, 1861 - spotted least gecko
- Sphaerodactylus molei Boettger, 1894 - Tobago least gecko
- Sphaerodactylus monensis Meerwarth, 1901 - Mona least gecko
- Sphaerodactylus nicholsi Grant, 1931 - Nichols least gecko, Nichol's dwarf sphaero, Puerto Rican crescent sphaero
- Sphaerodactylus nigropunctatus Gray, 1845 - black-spotted least gecko, three-banded sphaero
- Sphaerodactylus notatus Baird, 1859 - reef gecko, brown-speckled sphaero
- Sphaerodactylus nycteropus Thomas & Schwartz, 1977 - Morne Dubois least gecko
- Sphaerodactylus ocoae Schwartz, 1977 - Peravia least gecko
- Sphaerodactylus oliveri Grant, 1944 - Juventud least gecko
- Sphaerodactylus omoglaux Thomas, 1982 - Fond Parisien least gecko
- Sphaerodactylus oxyrhinus Gosse, 1850 - Jamaican sharpnosed sphaero
- Sphaerodactylus pacificus Stejneger, 1903 - Pacific least gecko
- Sphaerodactylus parkeri (Grant, 1939) - Parker's least gecko, southern Jamaica banded sphaero
- Sphaerodactylus parthenopion Thomas, 1965 - Virgin Islands dwarf sphaero, Virgin Gorda least gecko, Virgin Islands dwarf gecko
- Sphaerodactylus parvus King, 1962 - Anguilla Bank geckolet
- Sphaerodactylus perissodactylius Thomas & Hedges, 1988 - Dominican least gecko
- Sphaerodactylus phyzacinus Thomas, 1964 - Les Saintes geckolet
- Sphaerodactylus pimienta Thomas, Hedges & Garrido, 1998 - pepper sphaero, Cuban pepper sphaero
- Sphaerodactylus plummeri Thomas & Hedges, 1992 - Barahona big-scaled sphaero
- Sphaerodactylus poindexteri McCranie & Hedges, 2013 - Utila small-scaled geckolet
- Sphaerodactylus ramsdeni Ruibal, 1959 - Ramsden's least gecko
- Sphaerodactylus randi Shreve, 1968 - Pedernales least gecko
- Sphaerodactylus rhabdotus Schwartz, 1970 - two-striped sphaero, Vallede Neiba least gecko
- Sphaerodactylus richardi Hedges & Garrido, 1993 - Richard's banded sphaero, Zapata big-scaled sphaero
- Sphaerodactylus richardsonii Gray, 1845 - Richardson's least gecko, northern Jamaica banded sphaero
- Sphaerodactylus roosevelti Grant, 1931 - Roosevelt's beige sphaero, Roosevelt's least gecko
- Sphaerodactylus rosaurae Parker, 1940 - Bay Island least gecko
- Sphaerodactylus ruibali Grant, 1959 - Ruibal's least gecko
- Sphaerodactylus sabanus Cochran, 1938 - Saba least gecko
- Sphaerodactylus samanensis Cochran, 1932 - Samana least gecko
- Sphaerodactylus savagei Shreve, 1968 - Altagracia speckled sphaero, Savage's least gecko
- Sphaerodactylus scaber Barbour & Ramsden, 1919 - double-collared sphaero, Camaguey least gecko
- Sphaerodactylus scapularis Boulenger, 1902 - Boulenger's least gecko
- Sphaerodactylus schuberti Thomas & Hedges, 1998 - Neiba agave geckolet, Neiba agave sphaero, Schubert's least gecko
- Sphaerodactylus schwartzi Thomas, Hedges & Garrido, 1992 - Guantanamo collared sphaero, Monitongas collared geckolet, Schwartz's dwarf gecko
- Sphaerodactylus semasiops Thomas, 1975 - Cockpit eyespot sphaero, Cockpit least gecko
- Sphaerodactylus shrevei Lazell, 1961 - Shreve's least gecko
- Sphaerodactylus siboney Fong & Diaz, 2004 - Siboney gray-headed geckolet
- Sphaerodactylus sommeri Graham, 1981 - TerreNueve least gecko, Terre-Neuve least gecko, northwest Haitian banded geckolet
- Sphaerodactylus sputator (Sparrman, 1784) - island least gecko
- Sphaerodactylus storeyae Grant, 1944 - Isle of Pines sphaero, Los Canarreos sphaero
- Sphaerodactylus streptophorus Thomas & Schwartz, 1977 - Hispaniola least gecko, Hispaniolan small-eared sphaero
- Sphaerodactylus thompsoni Schwartz & Franz, 1976 - Thompson's least gecko, Barahona limestone sphaero
- Sphaerodactylus torrei Barbour, 1914 - Barbour's least gecko, Cuban broad-banded geckolet
- Sphaerodactylus townsendi Grant, 1931 - Townsend's least gecko, Townsend's dwarf sphaero, Puerto Rican sandy geckolet
- Sphaerodactylus underwoodi Schwartz, 1968 - Underwood's least gecko, Turks Islands geckolet
- Sphaerodactylus verdeluzicola Díaz-Lameiro, Villamil, Gamble, Pinto, Herrera-Martínez, Thomas, Bernstein, Titus-McQuillan, Nielsen, Agosto-Torres, Puente-Rolón, Bird-Picó, Oleksyk, Martínez-Cruzado & Daza, 2022 - Puerto Rican karst gecko
- Sphaerodactylus vincenti Boulenger, 1891 - Vincent's least gecko, Central Lesser Antillean sphaero, Windward geckolet
- Sphaerodactylus williamsi Thomas & Schwartz, 1983 - Williams's least gecko, Haitian striped geckolet
- Sphaerodactylus zygaena Schwartz, 1977 - Dame-Marie least gecko, Tiburon coastal geckolet

Nota bene: A binomial authority in parentheses indicates that the species was originally described in a genus other than Sphaerodactylus.
