= Sphaerodactylus exsul =

Scientific classification
- Domain: Eukaryota
- Kingdom: Animalia
- Phylum: Chordata
- Class: Reptilia
- Order: Squamata
- Infraorder: Gekkota
- Family: Sphaerodactylidae
- Genus: Sphaerodactylus
- Species: S. exsul

Binomial name
- Sphaerodactylus exsul Barbour, 1914

Species of lizard

Sphaerodactylus exsul is a species of lizard in the family Sphaerodactylidae. It is endemic to the Swan Islands in Honduras.
