= Dame-Marie least gecko =

Conservation status
- Endangered (IUCN 3.1)

Scientific classification
- Kingdom: Animalia
- Phylum: Chordata
- Class: Reptilia
- Order: Squamata
- Suborder: Gekkota
- Family: Sphaerodactylidae
- Genus: Sphaerodactylus
- Species: S. zygaena

Binomial name
- Sphaerodactylus zygaena Schwartz, 1977

Species of lizard

The Dame-Marie least gecko (Sphaerodactylus zygaena) is a species of lizard in the family Sphaerodactylidae. It is endemic to Haiti.
