= El Yunque least gecko =

Conservation status
- Data Deficient (IUCN 3.1)

Scientific classification
- Kingdom: Animalia
- Phylum: Chordata
- Class: Reptilia
- Order: Squamata
- Suborder: Gekkota
- Family: Sphaerodactylidae
- Genus: Sphaerodactylus
- Species: S. bromeliarum

Binomial name
- Sphaerodactylus bromeliarum Peters & Schwartz, 1977

Species of lizard

The El Yunque least gecko (Sphaerodactylus bromeliarum) is a species of lizard in the family Sphaerodactylidae. It is endemic to Cuba.
