= Sphaerodactylus difficilis =

Conservation status
- Least Concern (IUCN 3.1)

Scientific classification
- Kingdom: Animalia
- Phylum: Chordata
- Class: Reptilia
- Order: Squamata
- Suborder: Gekkota
- Family: Sphaerodactylidae
- Genus: Sphaerodactylus
- Species: S. difficilis

Binomial name
- Sphaerodactylus difficilis Barbour, 1914

Species of lizard

Sphaerodactylus difficilis, also known as the Hispaniolan eyespot sphaero or difficult least gecko, is a species of lizard in the family Sphaerodactylidae . It is endemic to Hispaniola. Sphaerodactylus difficilis has horizontal stripes on its body except for its head and neck when it is young, and brown spots appear on its back when it becomes an adult.
