= Sphaerodactylus guanajae =

Scientific classification
- Kingdom: Animalia
- Phylum: Chordata
- Class: Reptilia
- Order: Squamata
- Suborder: Gekkota
- Family: Sphaerodactylidae
- Genus: Sphaerodactylus
- Species: S. guanajae

Binomial name
- Sphaerodactylus guanajae McCranie & Hedges, 2012

Species of lizard

Sphaerodactylus guanajae is a species of lizard in the family Sphaerodactylidae. It is endemic to Islas de la Bahía and Islas de la Bahía in Honduras.
