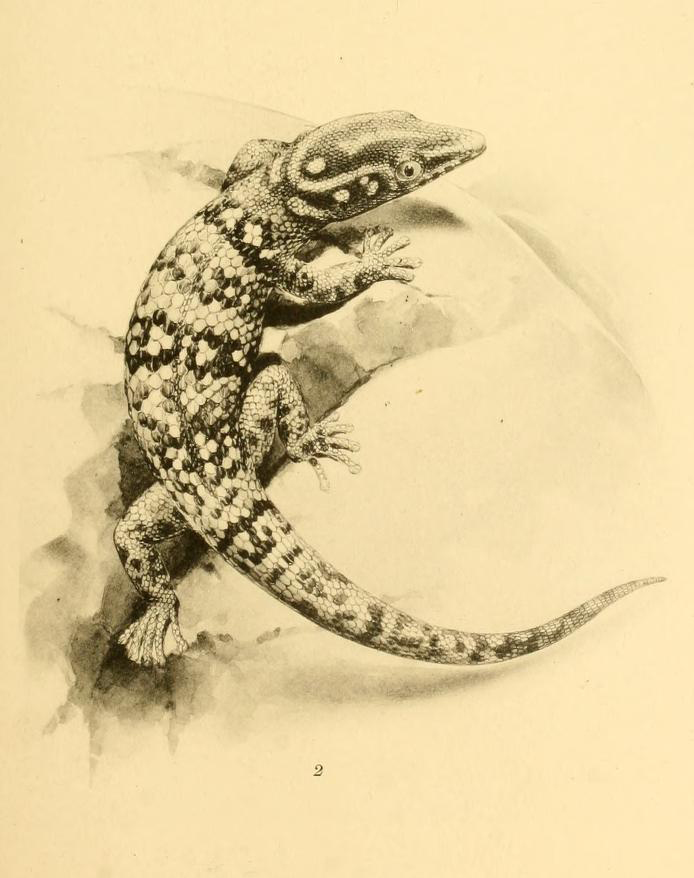
- Sphaerodactylus copei, drawing by E.N. Fischer from Barbour, 1921

Conservation status
- Near Threatened (IUCN 3.1)

Scientific classification
- Kingdom: Animalia
- Phylum: Chordata
- Class: Reptilia
- Order: Squamata
- Suborder: Gekkota
- Family: Sphaerodactylidae
- Genus: Sphaerodactylus
- Species: S. copei

Binomial name
- Sphaerodactylus copei Steindachner, 1867

Synonyms
- Sphaerodactylus anthracinus Cope, 1862; Sphaerodactylus copei Steindachner, 1867; Sphaerodactylus copii [sic] — Boulenger, 1885; Sphaerodactylus asper Garman, 1888; Sphaerodactylus copei — Schwartz & Henderson, 1991

= Cope's least gecko =

Species of lizard

Cope's least gecko (Sphaerodactylus copei) is a species of lizard in the family Sphaerodactylidae. The species is endemic to the West Indies.

== Etymology ==
The specific name, copei, is in honor of American herpetologist and paleontologist Edward Drinker Cope.

== Geographic range ==
S. copei is found in Haiti and the Bahamas. Whether the Bahamian populations result from introductions or natural dispersal is debated.

== Habitat ==
The preferred habitat of S. copei is forest at altitudes of 0–900 m (0–2,953 ft). Through findings in the terms of biogeographic and other relationships, it was found that the West Indian Geckos belong to the genus Sphaerodactylus by the analysis of protein variation.

== Reproduction ==
S. copei is oviparous.

== Subspecies ==
Nine subspecies are recognized as being valid, including the nominotypical subspecies

- Sphaerodactylus copei astreptus Schwartz, 1975
- Sphaerodactylus copei cataplexis Schwartz & Thomas, 1965
- Sphaerodactylus copei copei Steindachner, 1867
- Sphaerodactylus copei deuterus Schwartz, 1975
- Sphaerodactylus copei enochrus Schwartz & Thomas, 1965
- Sphaerodactylus copei pelates Schwartz, 1975
- Sphaerodactylus copei picturatus Garman, 1887
- Sphaerodactylus copei polyommatus Thomas, 1968
- Sphaerodactylus copei websteri Schwartz, 1975
