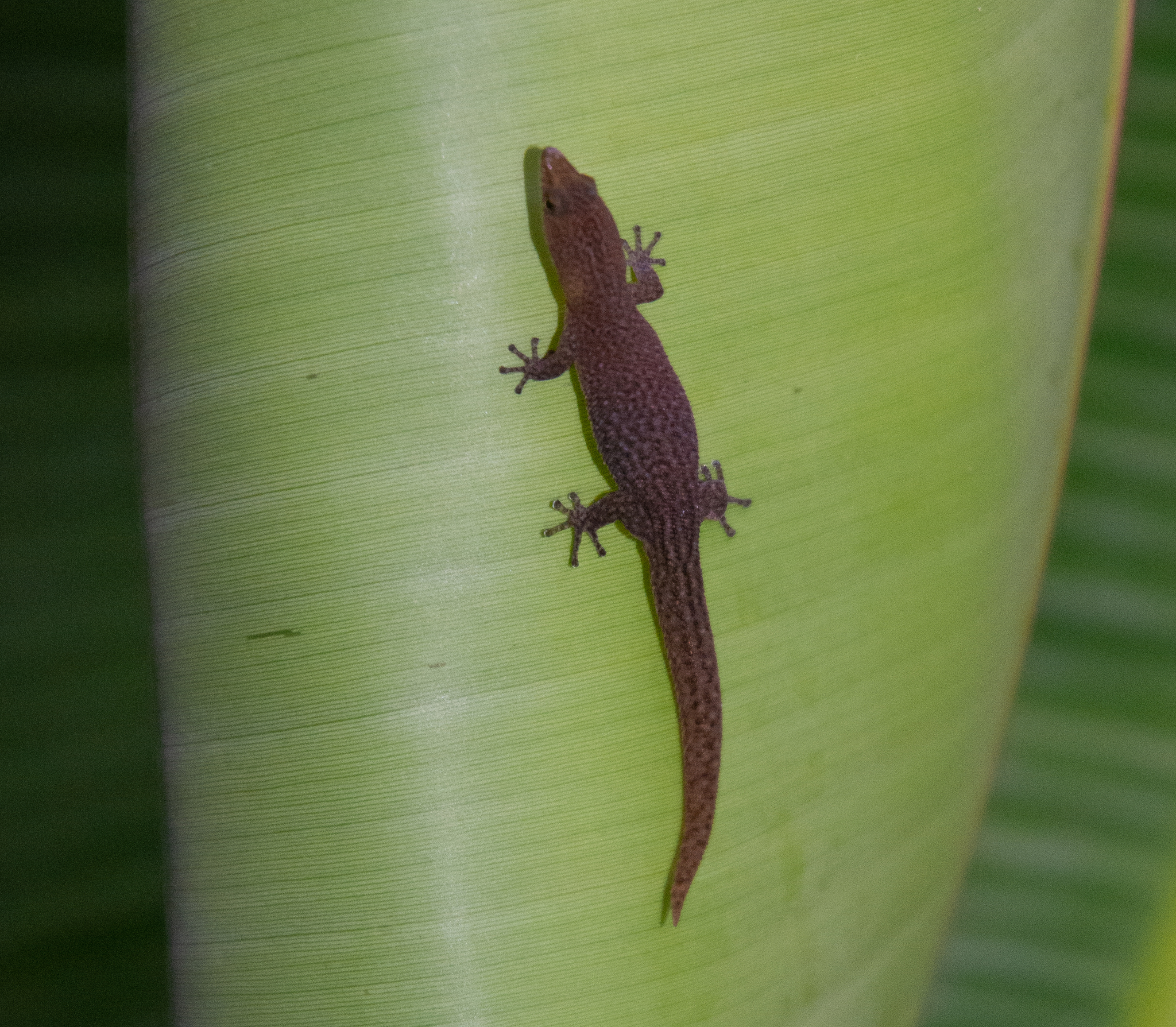

Conservation status
- Least Concern (IUCN 3.1)

Scientific classification
- Domain: Eukaryota
- Kingdom: Animalia
- Phylum: Chordata
- Class: Reptilia
- Order: Squamata
- Infraorder: Gekkota
- Family: Sphaerodactylidae
- Genus: Sphaerodactylus
- Species: S. argivus

Binomial name
- Sphaerodactylus argivus Garman, 1888

= Cayman least gecko =

Species of lizard

The Cayman least gecko (Sphaerodactylus argivus) is a species of lizard in the family Sphaerodactylidae. It is endemic to Cayman Brac in the Cayman Islands.
