= Boulenger's least gecko =

Conservation status
- Endangered (IUCN 3.1)

Scientific classification
- Kingdom: Animalia
- Phylum: Chordata
- Class: Reptilia
- Order: Squamata
- Suborder: Gekkota
- Family: Sphaerodactylidae
- Genus: Sphaerodactylus
- Species: S. scapularis

Binomial name
- Sphaerodactylus scapularis Boulenger, 1902

Species of lizard

Boulenger's least gecko (Sphaerodactylus scapularis) is a species of lizard in the family Sphaerodactylidae. It is found in Ecuador and Colombia.
