= Sphaerodactylus verdeluzicola =

Scientific classification
- Kingdom: Animalia
- Phylum: Chordata
- Class: Reptilia
- Order: Squamata
- Suborder: Gekkota
- Family: Sphaerodactylidae
- Genus: Sphaerodactylus
- Species: S. verdeluzicola

Binomial name
- Sphaerodactylus verdeluzicola Díaz-Lameiro, Villamil, Gamble, Pinto, Herrera-Martínez, Thomas, Bernstein, Titus-McQuillan, Nielsen, Agosto-Torres, Puente-Rolón, Bird-Picó, Oleksyk, Martínez-Cruzado, & Daza, 2022

Species of lizard

Sphaerodactylus verdeluzicola, also known commonly as the Puerto Rican karst gecko, is a small species of lizard in the family Sphaerodactylidae. The species is endemic to Puerto Rico.

Background and Discovery

The colonization history of dwarf geckos of the genus Sphaerodactylus in the Mona Passage—spanning the islands of Puerto Rico, Mona, and Desecheo—has been reconstructed using mitochondrial DNA from the 12S and 16S rRNA genes. A phylogeographic study proposed a stepwise colonization model in which Sphaerodactylus nicholsi from southwestern Puerto Rico dispersed to Mona Island, giving rise to the endemic S. monensis, which subsequently colonized Desecheo Island and diverged into S. levinsi. Phylogenetic analyses and haplotype networks showed that these three species form a monophyletic group distinct from other Caribbean species, with divergence times estimated at approximately 3 million years ago for the Mona colonization and 2.6 million years ago for the subsequent dispersal to Desecheo. The study also identified a genetically distinct population of Sphaerodactylus in Rincón, Puerto Rico, that may represent a previously undescribed species.

Species Description

This population was formally described in 2022 as Sphaerodactylus verdeluzicola, the first new species of dwarf gecko described from Puerto Rico in nearly a century. S. verdeluzicola was differentiated from its sister species S. klauberi by differences in body size, scale morphology, head coloration, and skull structure, as well as by a 16S rRNA mitochondrial sequence divergence of 5.1–5.6%, a level exceeding the commonly used threshold for species-level distinction in reptiles. Formerly referred to as Cluster I by Thomas and Schwartz (1966), Sphaerodactylus spp. by Díaz-Lameiro et al. (2013), and the "Northwest clade" of S. klauberi by Daza et al. (2019), this lineage is now recognized as taxonomically distinct.

Taxonomic Consequences

The recognition of S. verdeluzicola also leads to a taxonomic revision of S. klauberi, which is now restricted to high-elevation populations in El Yunque National Forest, the Sierra de Cayey, and the Cordillera Central. Although the genetic diversity within S. verdeluzicola based on the 16S gene appears low, variation in faster-evolving loci such as ND2 has been reported. The estimated population density in the Rincón locality was approximately 3,983 individuals per hectare, which is relatively moderate compared to other species in the genus. This discovery highlights the importance of continued field surveys and integrative taxonomic research in well-studied biogeographic regions like Puerto Rico to ensure proper conservation planning and biodiversity assessments.
