= Armstrong's least gecko =

Conservation status
- Least Concern (IUCN 3.1)

Scientific classification
- Kingdom: Animalia
- Phylum: Chordata
- Class: Reptilia
- Order: Squamata
- Suborder: Gekkota
- Family: Sphaerodactylidae
- Genus: Sphaerodactylus
- Species: S. armstrongi

Binomial name
- Sphaerodactylus armstrongi Noble & Hassler, 1933

Species of lizard

Armstrong's least gecko (Sphaerodactylus armstrongi), also known commonly as the southern forest geckolet, is a species of lizard in the family Sphaerodactylidae. The species is endemic to the island of Hispaniola.

== Etymology ==
The specific name, armstrongi, is in honor of Lorenzo D. Armstrong, a patron of the American Museum of Natural History who financed the 1932 expedition on which the holotype was collected.

== Geographic range ==
S. armstrongi is found in the Dominican Republic and Haiti.

== Habitat ==
The preferred natural habitat of S. armstrongi is forest, at altitudes from sea level to 1,800 m (5,900 ft).

== Reproduction ==
S. armstrongi is oviparous.
