= Sphaerodactylus altavelensis =

Conservation status
- Least Concern (IUCN 3.1)

Scientific classification
- Domain: Eukaryota
- Kingdom: Animalia
- Phylum: Chordata
- Class: Reptilia
- Order: Squamata
- Infraorder: Gekkota
- Family: Sphaerodactylidae
- Genus: Sphaerodactylus
- Species: S. altavelensis

Binomial name
- Sphaerodactylus altavelensis Noble, 1933

Species of lizard

Sphaerodactylus altavelensis, also known as the Alto Velo least gecko or Alto Velo sphaero, is a species of lizard in the family Sphaerodactylidae. It is endemic to Hispaniola.
