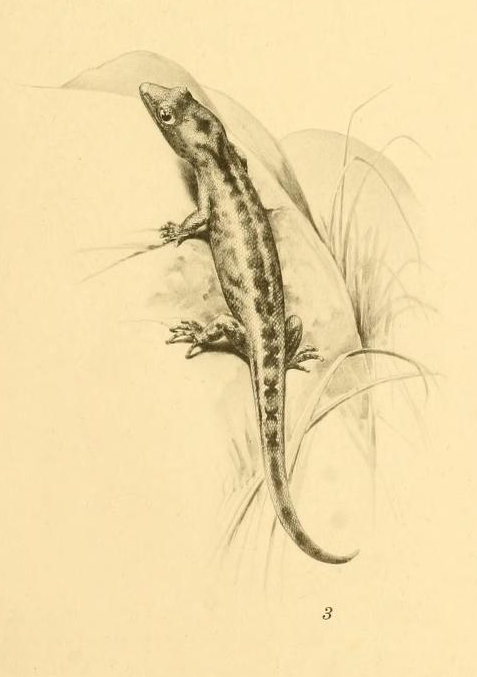

Conservation status
- Near Threatened (IUCN 3.1)

Scientific classification
- Kingdom: Animalia
- Phylum: Chordata
- Class: Reptilia
- Order: Squamata
- Suborder: Gekkota
- Family: Sphaerodactylidae
- Genus: Sphaerodactylus
- Species: S. goniorhynchus

Binomial name
- Sphaerodactylus goniorhynchus Cope, 1895

= Sphaerodactylus goniorhynchus =

Species of lizard

Sphaerodactylus goniorhynchus, also known as the Jamaican forest sphaero or Cakoarita least gecko, is a species of lizard in the family Sphaerodactylidae . It is endemic to Jamaica.
