= Dunn's least gecko =

Conservation status
- Least Concern (IUCN 3.1)

Scientific classification
- Kingdom: Animalia
- Phylum: Chordata
- Class: Reptilia
- Order: Squamata
- Suborder: Gekkota
- Family: Sphaerodactylidae
- Genus: Sphaerodactylus
- Species: S. dunni

Binomial name
- Sphaerodactylus dunni Schmidt, 1936

Species of lizard

Dunn's least gecko (Sphaerodactylus dunni) is a species of lizard in the family Sphaerodactylidae. The species is endemic to Honduras.

== Etymology ==
The specific name, dunni, is in honor of American herpetologist Emmett Reid Dunn.

== Geographic range ==
S. dunni is found in northern Honduras.

== Habitat ==
The preferred natural habitat of S. dunni is forest, at altitudes of 60–700 m (200–2,300 ft).

== Description ==
The holotype of S. dunni has a snout-to-vent length (SVL) of 25 mm (0.98 in). The dorsal scales are keeled and imbricate (overlapping).

== Behavior ==
S. dunni is terrestrial and diurnal.

== Reproduction ==
S. dunni is oviparous.
