= Sphaerodactylus heliconiae =

Conservation status
- Near Threatened (IUCN 3.1)

Scientific classification
- Kingdom: Animalia
- Phylum: Chordata
- Class: Reptilia
- Order: Squamata
- Suborder: Gekkota
- Family: Sphaerodactylidae
- Genus: Sphaerodactylus
- Species: S. heliconiae

Binomial name
- Sphaerodactylus heliconiae Harris, 1982

Species of lizard

Sphaerodactylus heliconiae is a species of lizard in the family Sphaerodactylidae. It is endemic to Colombia.
