= Sphaerodactylus streptophorus =

Conservation status
- Vulnerable (IUCN 3.1)

Scientific classification
- Kingdom: Animalia
- Phylum: Chordata
- Class: Reptilia
- Order: Squamata
- Suborder: Gekkota
- Family: Sphaerodactylidae
- Genus: Sphaerodactylus
- Species: S. streptophorus

Binomial name
- Sphaerodactylus streptophorus Thomas & Schwartz, 1977

Species of lizard

Sphaerodactylus streptophorus, also known as the Hispaniola least gecko or Hispaniolan small-eared sphaero, is a small species of gecko endemic to Hispaniola.
