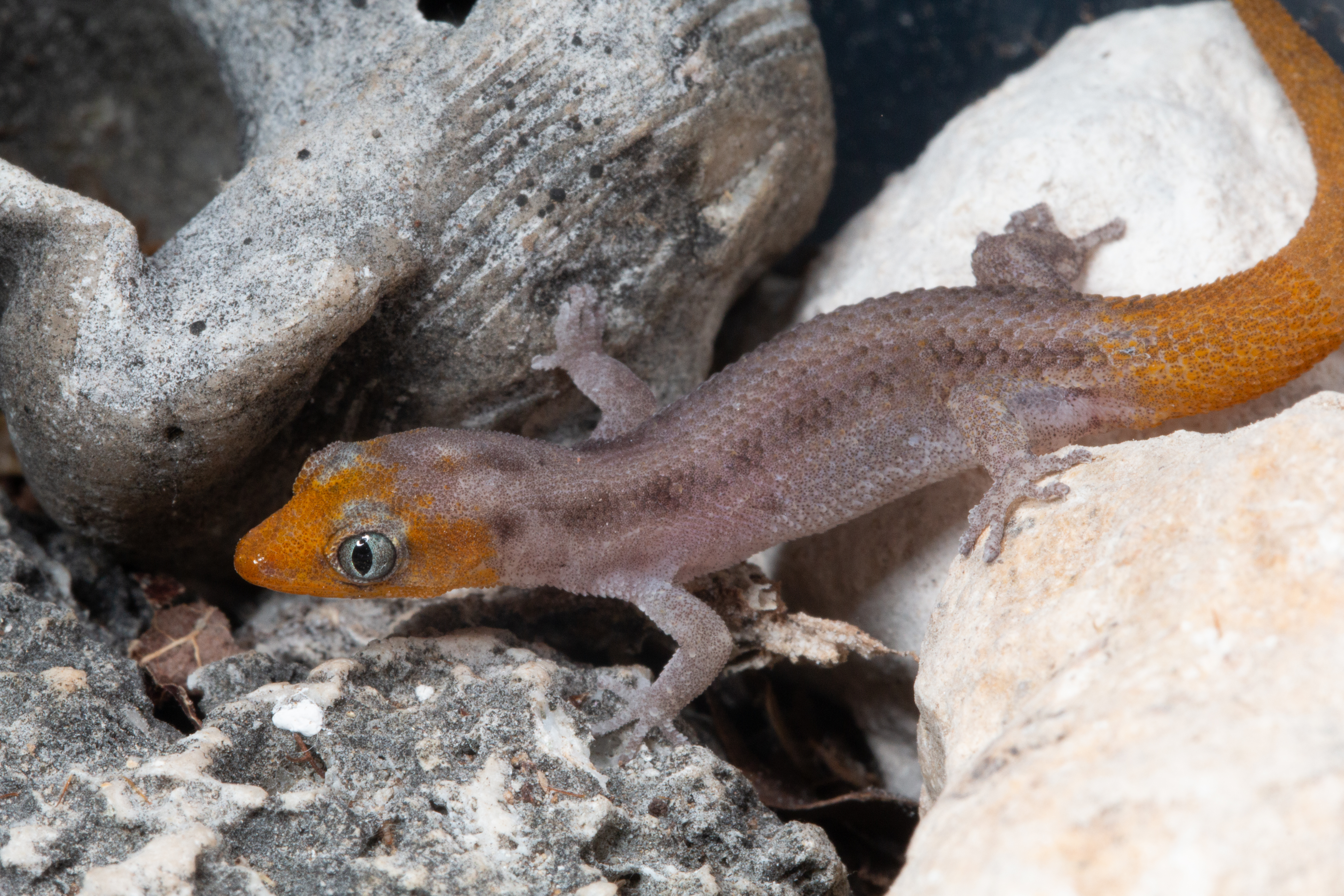

Conservation status
- Endangered (IUCN 3.1)

Scientific classification
- Domain: Eukaryota
- Kingdom: Animalia
- Phylum: Chordata
- Class: Reptilia
- Order: Squamata
- Infraorder: Gekkota
- Family: Sphaerodactylidae
- Genus: Sphaerodactylus
- Species: S. rhabdotus

Binomial name
- Sphaerodactylus rhabdotus Schwartz, 1970

= Sphaerodactylus rhabdotus =

Species of lizard

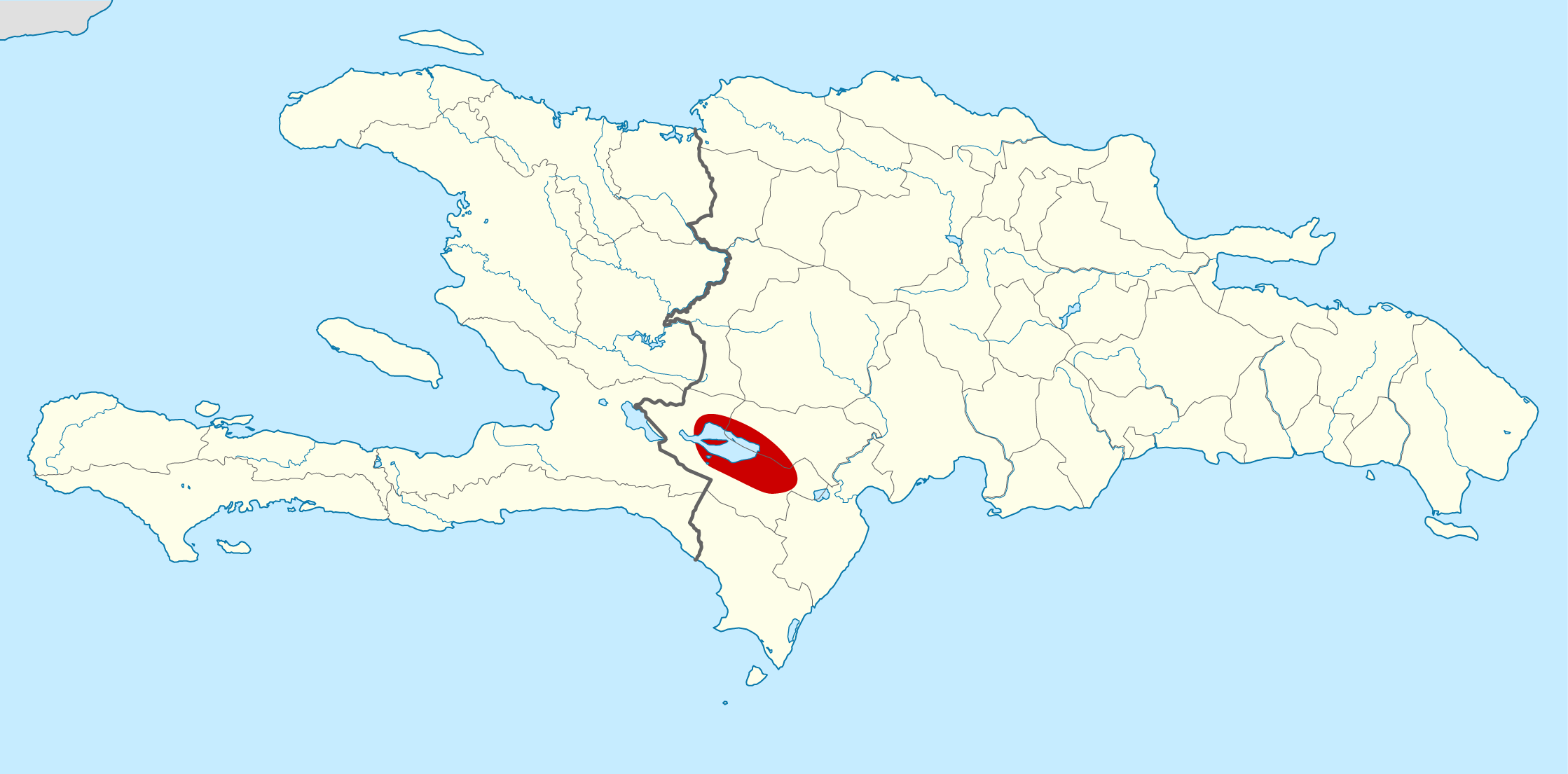
Distribution of Sphaerodactylus rhabdotus (known range; red).

Sphaerodactylus rhabdotus, also known as the two-striped sphaero or Valle de Neiba least gecko, is a small species of gecko endemic to the Dominican Republic.
