= Samana least gecko =

Conservation status
- Critically Endangered (IUCN 3.1)

Scientific classification
- Kingdom: Animalia
- Phylum: Chordata
- Class: Reptilia
- Order: Squamata
- Suborder: Gekkota
- Family: Sphaerodactylidae
- Genus: Sphaerodactylus
- Species: S. samanensis

Binomial name
- Sphaerodactylus samanensis Cochran, 1932

Species of lizard

The Samana least gecko (Sphaerodactylus samanensis) is a species of lizard in the family Sphaerodactylidae. It is endemic to the Dominican Republic.

== Description ==
S. samanensis is characterized by a distinctive banded dorsal pattern. The body displays a series of dark transverse bands alternating with lighter interspaces along the dorsum and tail. The ground color is typically pale grayish-brown to tan, with darker brown to blackish crossbands that are well-defined and regular in spacing.

== Distribution ==
Sphaerodactylus samanensis is endemic to the Dominican Republic on the island of Hispaniola. The species was originally known only from the type locality in the Haitises region (Los Haitises National Park) in the northeastern part of the country. More recent surveys have expanded the known range to include additional localities in the same general region, though it remains restricted to a relatively small area of suitable limestone forest habitat.

== Taxonomy ==
The relationships of S. samanensis to other species in the genus are not fully resolved. Early molecular studies using protein electrophoresis placed it in a clade of species almost entirely from Hispaniola, including those of the difficilis complex and the banded species S. callocricus, thought to be a close relative based on morphology. Another banded species, S. epiurus, described in 1993, is considered closely related to S. samanensis and S. callocricus.

== Habitat and Ecology ==
Sphaerodactylus samanensis inhabits leaf litter and rock crevices in semi-arid to mesic karstic forests of the Haitises region. The species is associated with limestone substrates and individuals are most commonly encountered under rocks, fallen logs, and within the accumulated organic matter of the forest floor.

== Conservation ==
Despite the expanded known range, S. samanensis remains a rarely encountered species and was designated as Critically Endangered by the IUCN in 2016. Conservation efforts continue to monitor populations throughout its range.
