= Sphaerodactylus siboney =

Conservation status
- Least Concern (IUCN 3.1)

Scientific classification
- Kingdom: Animalia
- Phylum: Chordata
- Class: Reptilia
- Order: Squamata
- Suborder: Gekkota
- Family: Sphaerodactylidae
- Genus: Sphaerodactylus
- Species: S. siboney

Binomial name
- Sphaerodactylus siboney Fong & Diaz, 2004

Species of lizard

Sphaerodactylus siboney is a small species of gecko endemic to Cuba.
