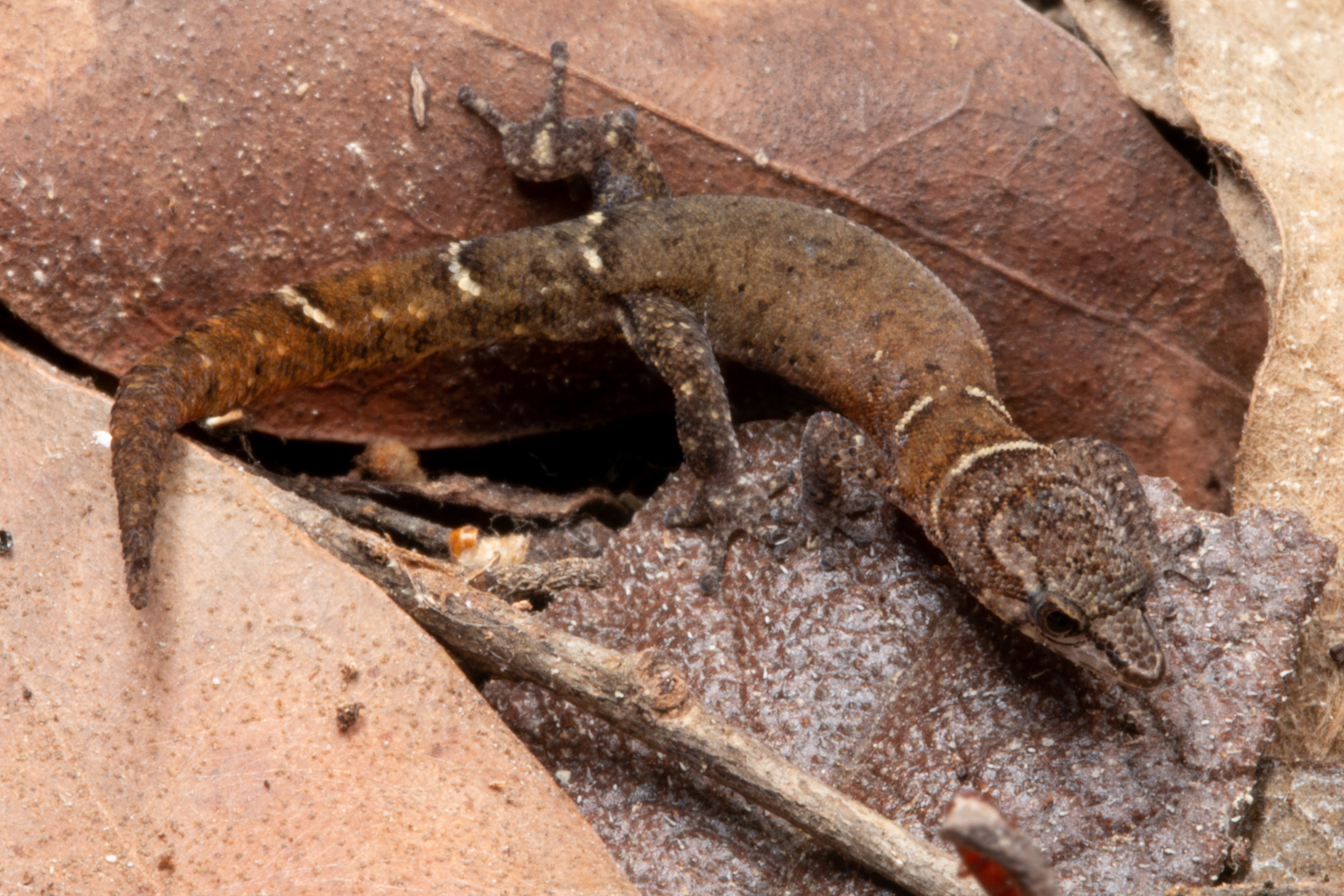

Conservation status
- Endangered (IUCN 3.1)

Scientific classification
- Kingdom: Animalia
- Phylum: Chordata
- Class: Reptilia
- Order: Squamata
- Suborder: Gekkota
- Family: Sphaerodactylidae
- Genus: Sphaerodactylus
- Species: S. perissodactylius

Binomial name
- Sphaerodactylus perissodactylius Hedges & Thomas, 1988

= Dominican least gecko =

Species of lizard

The Dominican least gecko (Sphaerodactylus perissodactylius) is a species of lizard in the family Sphaerodactylidae. It is endemic to the Dominican Republic.

== Distribution ==
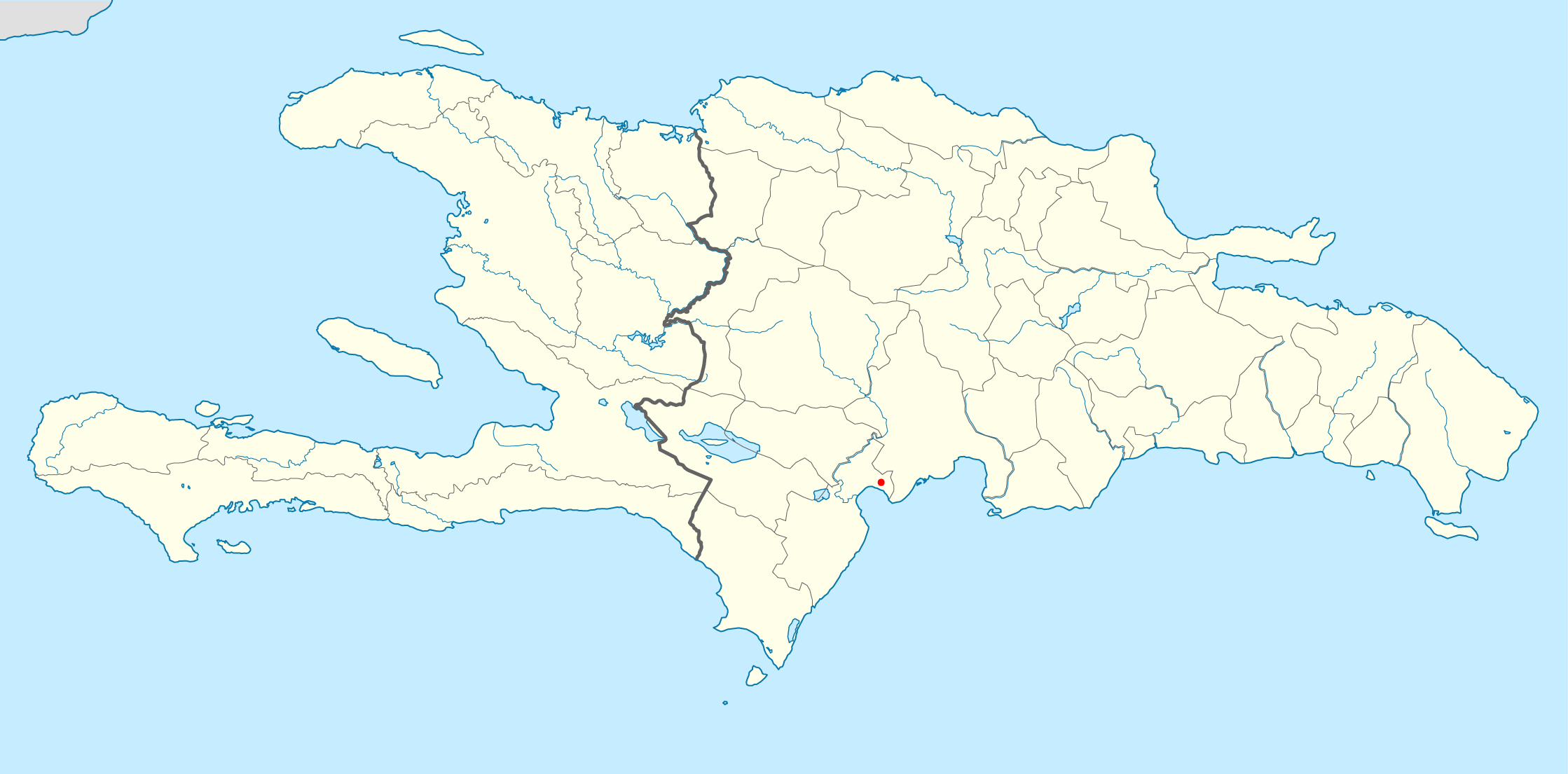
Distribution of Sphaerodactylus perissodactylius. Known range in red.

This species is only known from one locality in Sierra Martin Garcia.
