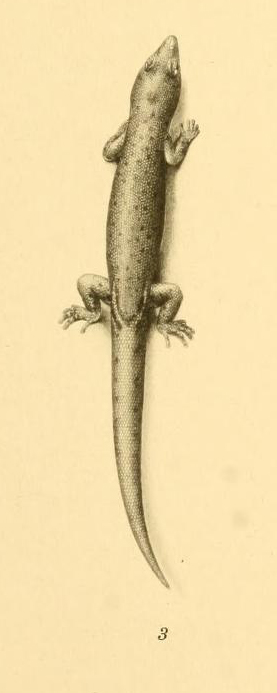
- 1921 illustration of specimen from Saint Vincent

Conservation status
- Least Concern (IUCN 3.1)

Scientific classification
- Kingdom: Animalia
- Phylum: Chordata
- Class: Reptilia
- Order: Squamata
- Suborder: Gekkota
- Family: Sphaerodactylidae
- Genus: Sphaerodactylus
- Species: S. vincenti

Binomial name
- Sphaerodactylus vincenti Boulenger, 1891

= Vincent's least gecko =

Species of lizard

Vincent's least gecko (Sphaerodactylus vincenti) is a species of lizard in the family Sphaerodactylidae. The species is endemic to the Caribbean.

== Geographic range ==
S. vincenti is found on the Windward Islands except for the southernmost island in the chain — Grenada, namely, on the islands of Dominica, Martinique, Saint Lucia, and Saint Vincent.

== Habitat ==
The preferred habitats of S. vincenti are forest and shrubland. Population density is greatest in moist, shaded leaf-litter. These microhabitats provide shelter, access to prey, and protection against desiccation.

== Reproduction ==
S. vincenti is oviparous.

== Etymology ==
The specific name, vincenti, refers to the island of Saint Vincent.

== Subspecies ==
Including the nominotypical subspecies, ten subspecies are recognized as being valid.

- Sphaerodactylus vincenti adamas Schwartz, 1964
- Sphaerodactylus vincenti diamesus Schwartz, 1964
- Sphaerodactylus vincenti festus Barbour, 1915
- Sphaerodactylus vincenti josephinae Schwartz, 1964
- Sphaerodactylus vincenti monilifer Barbour, 1921
- Sphaerodactylus vincenti paulmarinae Breuil, 2013
- Sphaerodactylus vincenti pheristus Schwartz, 1964
- Sphaerodactylus vincenti psammius Schwartz, 1964
- Sphaerodactylus vincenti ronaldi Schwartz, 1964
- Sphaerodactylus vincenti vincenti Boulenger, 1891
