= Sphaerodactylus dimorphicus =

Conservation status
- Endangered (IUCN 3.1)

Scientific classification
- Kingdom: Animalia
- Phylum: Chordata
- Class: Reptilia
- Order: Squamata
- Suborder: Gekkota
- Family: Sphaerodactylidae
- Genus: Sphaerodactylus
- Species: S. dimorphicus

Binomial name
- Sphaerodactylus dimorphicus Fong & Diaz, 2004

Species of lizard

Sphaerodactylus dimorphicus is a species of lizard in the family Sphaerodactylidae. It is endemic to Cuba.
