= Sphaerodactylus thompsoni =

Conservation status
- Endangered (IUCN 3.1)

Scientific classification
- Kingdom: Animalia
- Phylum: Chordata
- Class: Reptilia
- Order: Squamata
- Suborder: Gekkota
- Family: Sphaerodactylidae
- Genus: Sphaerodactylus
- Species: S. thompsoni

Binomial name
- Sphaerodactylus thompsoni Schwartz & Franz, 1976

Species of lizard

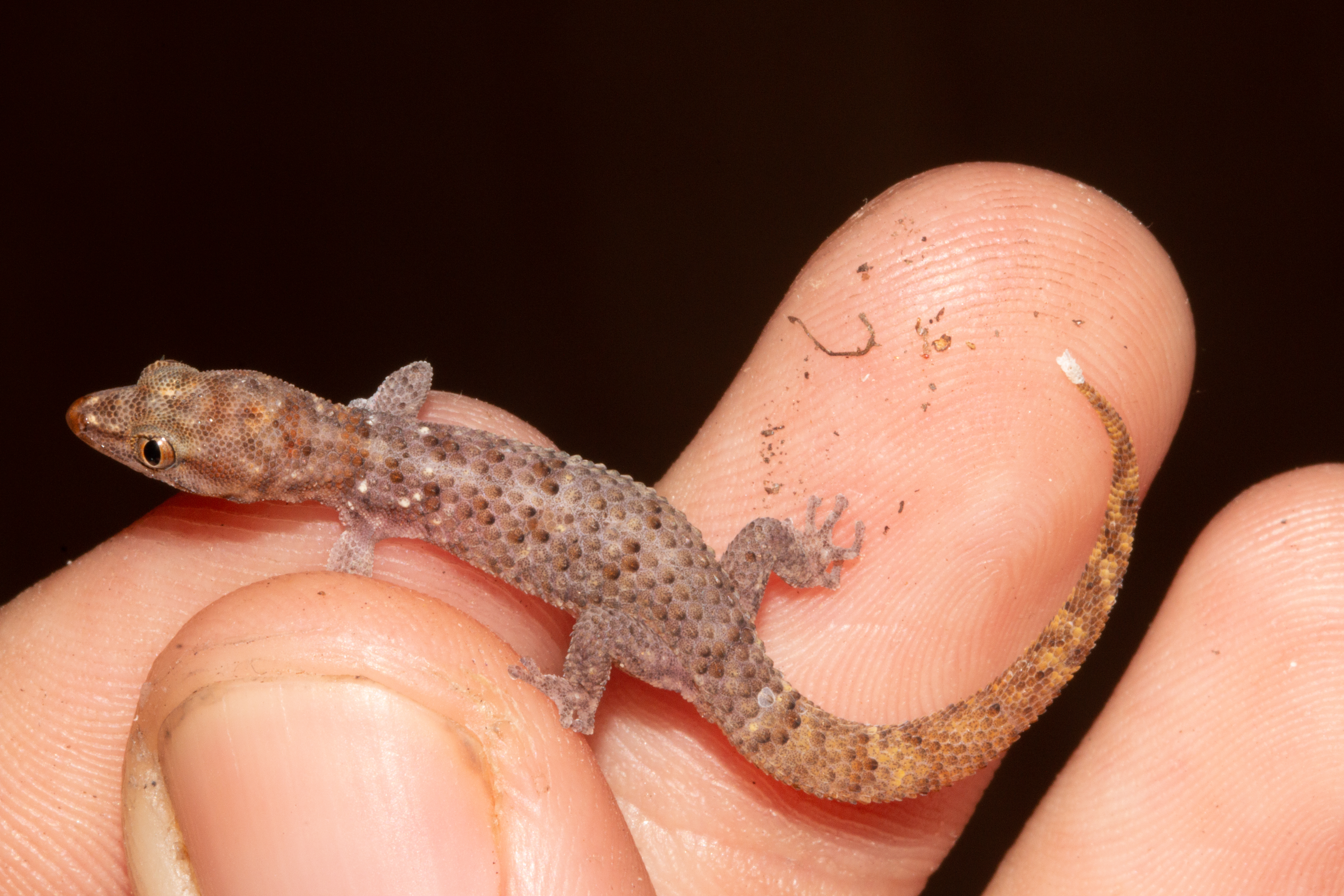
Adult male S. thompsoni

Sphaerodactylus thompsoni, also known commonly as Thompson's least gecko or the Barahona limestone geckolet, is a small species of lizard in the family Sphaerodactylidae. The species is endemic to Hispaniola.

== Etymology ==
The specific name, thompsoni, is in honor of American malacologist Fred Gilbert Thompson (1934–2016), collector of the holotype.

== Geographic range ==
S. thompsoni is found in the Dominican Republic and Haiti.

== Habitat ==
The preferred habitats of S. thompsoni are rocky areas and shrubland at altitudes of 0–60 m (0–197 ft).

== Description ==
Large for its genus, Sphaerodactylus thompsoni may attain a snout-to-vent length (SVL) of 3.3 cm (1.3 in).

== Reproduction ==
S. thompsoni is oviparous.
