= Ruibal's least gecko =

Conservation status
- Endangered (IUCN 3.1)

Scientific classification
- Kingdom: Animalia
- Phylum: Chordata
- Class: Reptilia
- Order: Squamata
- Suborder: Gekkota
- Family: Sphaerodactylidae
- Genus: Sphaerodactylus
- Species: S. ruibali

Binomial name
- Sphaerodactylus ruibali Grant, 1959

Species of lizard

Ruibal's least gecko (Sphaerodactylus ruibali) is a species of lizard in the family Sphaerodactylidae. The species is endemic to Cuba and was first described by Chapman Grant in 1959.

== Etymology ==
The specific name, ruibali, is in honor of Cuban-American herpetologist Rodolfo Ruibal (1927–2016).

== Habitat ==
The preferred habitats of S. ruibali are forest and shrubland at altitudes of 0–200 m (0–656 ft).

== Reproduction ==
S. ruibali is oviparous.
