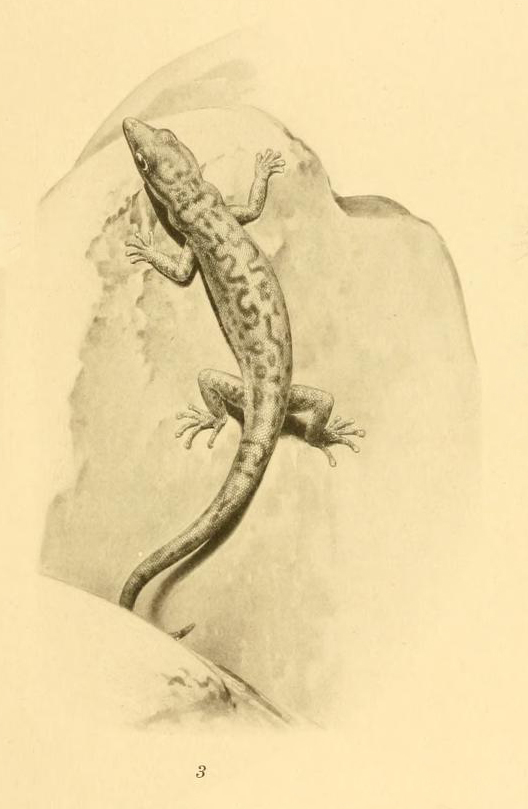

Conservation status
- Least Concern (IUCN 3.1)

Scientific classification
- Kingdom: Animalia
- Phylum: Chordata
- Class: Reptilia
- Order: Squamata
- Suborder: Gekkota
- Family: Sphaerodactylidae
- Genus: Sphaerodactylus
- Species: S. pacificus

Binomial name
- Sphaerodactylus pacificus Stejneger, 1903

= Pacific least gecko =

Species of lizard

The Pacific least gecko (Sphaerodactylus pacificus) is a species of lizard in the family Sphaerodactylidae. It is endemic to Cocos Island.
