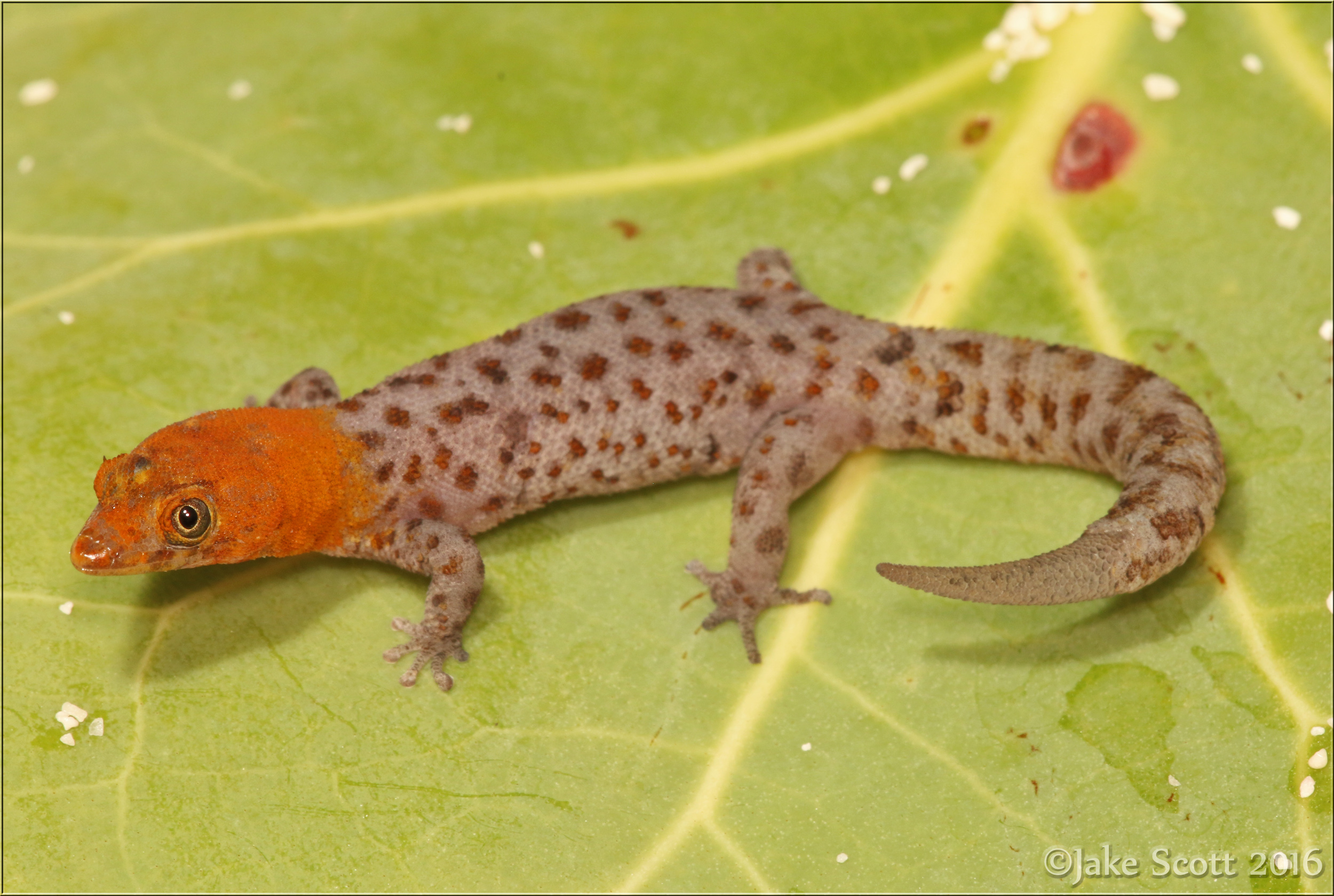

Conservation status
- Least Concern (IUCN 3.1)

Scientific classification
- Kingdom: Animalia
- Phylum: Chordata
- Class: Reptilia
- Order: Squamata
- Suborder: Gekkota
- Family: Sphaerodactylidae
- Genus: Sphaerodactylus
- Species: S. underwoodi

Binomial name
- Sphaerodactylus underwoodi Schwartz, 1968

= Sphaerodactylus underwoodi =

Species of lizard

Sphaerodactylus underwoodi, also known commonly as Underwood's least gecko or the Turks Islands geckolet, is a small species of lizard in the family Sphaerodactylidae. The species is endemic to Grand Turk Island.

== Etymology ==
The specific name, underwoodi, is in honor of British herpetologist Garth Leon Underwood.

== Habitat ==
The preferred habitat of S. underwoodi is shrubland.

== Reproduction ==
S. underwoodi is oviparous.
