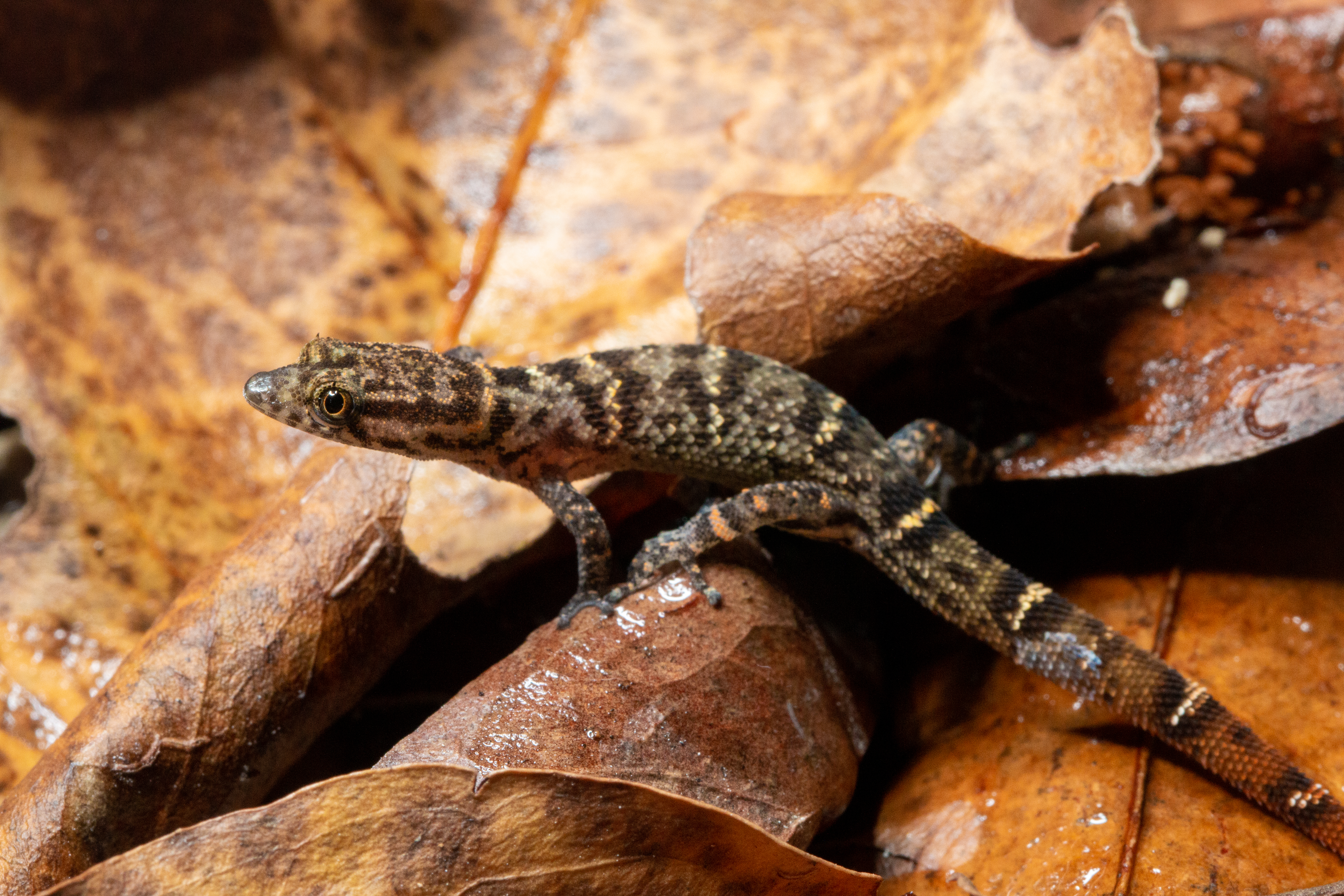

Conservation status
- Near Threatened (IUCN 3.1)

Scientific classification
- Kingdom: Animalia
- Phylum: Chordata
- Class: Reptilia
- Order: Squamata
- Suborder: Gekkota
- Family: Sphaerodactylidae
- Genus: Sphaerodactylus
- Species: S. savagei

Binomial name
- Sphaerodactylus savagei Shreve, 1968
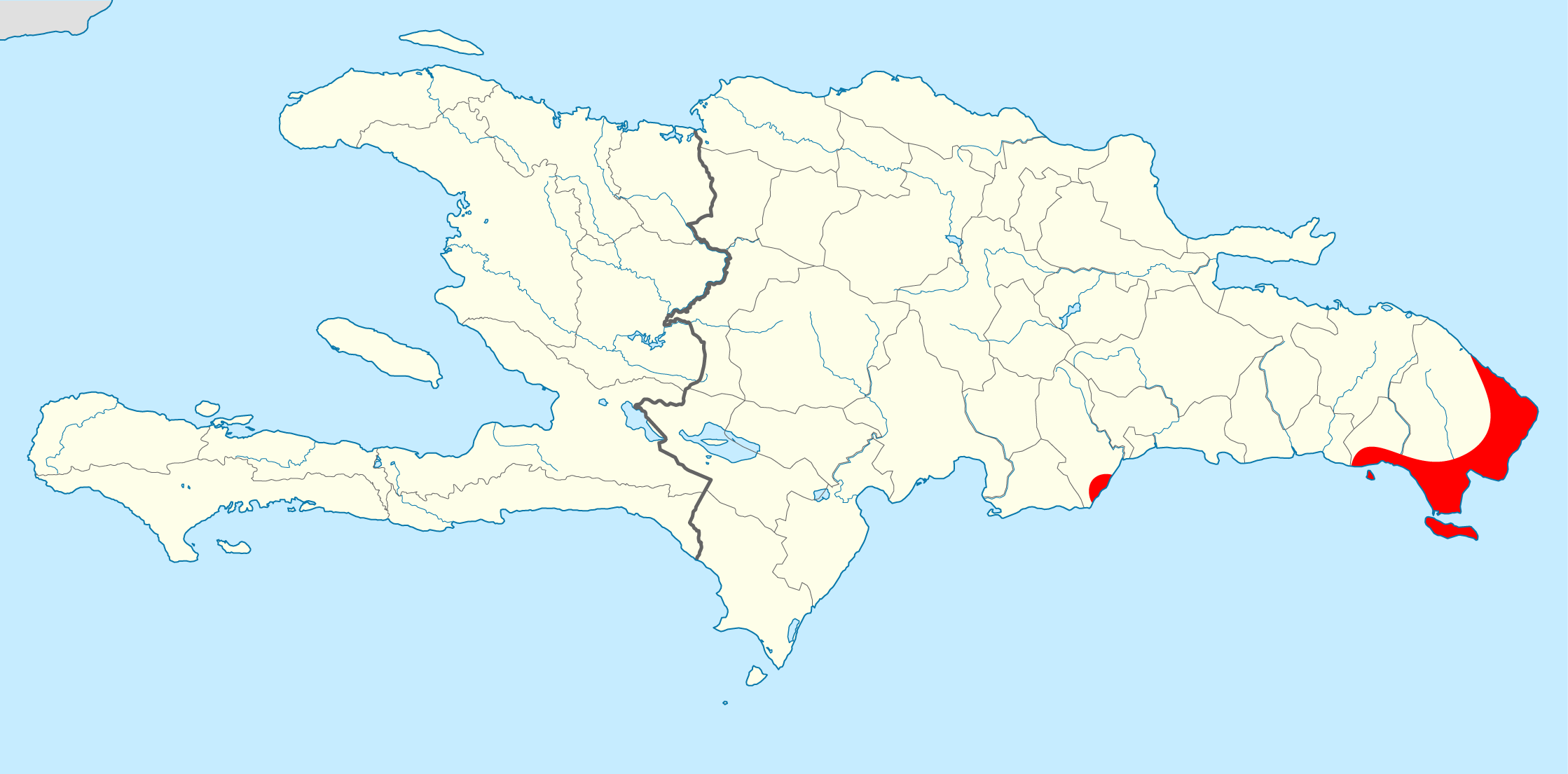

Synonyms
- Sphaerodactylus notatus savagei Shreve, 1968; Sphaerodactylus savagei — Schwartz & Thomas, 1975

= Sphaerodactylus savagei =

Species of lizard

Sphaerodactylus savagei, also known commonly as the Altagracia speckled sphaero or Savage's least gecko, is a small species of lizard in the family Sphaerodactylidae. The species is endemic to the Dominican Republic.

== Etymology ==
The specific name, savagei, is in honour of American herpetologist Jay M. Savage.

== Habitat ==
The preferred habitats of S. savagei are rocky areas and forests at altitudes of 0–116 m (0–381 ft)

== Reproduction ==
S. savagei is oviparous.

== Subspecies ==
Two subspecies are recognized as being valid, including the nominotypical subspecies.

- Sphaerodactylus savagei juanilloensis Shreve, 1968
- Sphaerodactylus savagei savagei Shreve, 1968
