= Sphaerodactylus parkeri =

Conservation status
- Endangered (IUCN 3.1)

Scientific classification
- Kingdom: Animalia
- Phylum: Chordata
- Class: Reptilia
- Order: Squamata
- Suborder: Gekkota
- Family: Sphaerodactylidae
- Genus: Sphaerodactylus
- Species: S. parkeri

Binomial name
- Sphaerodactylus parkeri (Grant, 1939)

Synonyms
- Spliacrodactylus parkeri Grant, 1939; Sphaerodactylus parkeri — Schwartz & Henderson, 1991

Species of lizard

Sphaerodactylus parkeri, also known commonly as Parker's least gecko or the southern Jamaica banded sphaero, is a small species of lizard in the family Sphaerodactylidae. The species is endemic to Jamaica.

== Etymology ==
The specific name, parkeri, is in honor of English herpetologist Hampton Wildman Parker.

== Habitat ==
The preferred habitat of Sphaerodactylus parkeri is forest at altitudes of 0–230 m (0–755 ft).

== Reproduction ==
Sphaerodactylus parkeri is oviparous.
