= Sphaerodactylus semasiops =

Conservation status
- Endangered (IUCN 3.1)

Scientific classification
- Domain: Eukaryota
- Kingdom: Animalia
- Phylum: Chordata
- Class: Reptilia
- Order: Squamata
- Infraorder: Gekkota
- Family: Sphaerodactylidae
- Genus: Sphaerodactylus
- Species: S. semasiops

Binomial name
- Sphaerodactylus semasiops Thomas, 1975

Species of lizard

Sphaerodactylus semasiops, also known as the Cockpit eyespot sphaero or Cockpit least gecko, is a small species of gecko endemic to Jamaica.
