= Sphaerodactylus phyzacinus =

Conservation status
- Endangered (IUCN 3.1)

Scientific classification
- Kingdom: Animalia
- Phylum: Chordata
- Class: Reptilia
- Order: Squamata
- Suborder: Gekkota
- Family: Sphaerodactylidae
- Genus: Sphaerodactylus
- Species: S. phyzacinus

Binomial name
- Sphaerodactylus phyzacinus Thomas, 1964

Synonyms
- Sphaerodactylus fantasticus phyzacinus Thomas, 1964

Species of lizard

Sphaerodactylus phyzacinus, the Les Saintes dwarf gecko or Les Saintes geckolet, is a species of lizard belonging to the family Sphaerodactylidae, the least geckos or sphaeros. This species is endemic to Guadeloupe.

== Taxonomy ==
Sphaerodactylus phyzacinus was first formally described in 1962 as a subspecies of S. macrolepis, S. fantasticus phyzacinus, by the American herpetologist Richard Thomas, with its type locality given as Îlet à Cabrit, Îles des Saintes, off Guadeloupe. In 2008 Roger Thorpe and his co-authors changed its taxonomic status from a subspecies to a species, S. phyzacinus. Sphaerodactylus was formerly included in the family Gekkonidae, but in 1954 Garth Underwood proposed the family Sphaerodactylidae. This family is classified within the infraorder Gekkota, the sole extant taxon within the clade Gekkonomorpha of the order Squamata, which includes the lizards and snakes.

== Etymology ==
Sphaerodactylus phyzacinus is a member of the genus Sphaerodactylus, a name which is a combination of the Greek sphaira, meaning "a ball", or sphairion, which means "a little ball", with dactylos, meaning "finger", seemingly an allusion to round tips to the toes. The specific name, phyzacinus, means "flighty", "timid" or "fearful" in Greek.

== Description ==
Sphaerodactylus phyzacinus is sexually dimorphic:

- In males the colour of the head is different from the colour of the body, being vermiculated with black to grey, to a variable extent. In the majority of males there is an obvious white spot on the back of the head. The back is yellowish brown with brown svcales forming speckling in some individuals or bars in others. The throat may be vermiculated or marbled with pale grey to buff and black.
- The females' heads are more indistinctly patterned, with a bright yellow throat. The tails have a pattern of ocelli, eye-like spots, when they are unbroken.

These are small geckos with the sexes being similar in size, with a maximum snout-vent length of 25 mm (1.0 in).

== Distribution and habitat ==
Sphaerodactylus phyzacinus is endemic to the Îles des Saintes, a small archipelago of four islands off Guadeloupe. These islands are Grand-Îlet, Terre de Bas, Îlet à Cabrit and Terre-de-Haut.They also occur on the small islet of La Coche. They are found under rocks and in the leaf litter of forests; some are found in sea grape (Coccoloba uvifera) leaf litter.
