= Sphaerodactylus leonardovaldesi =

Scientific classification
- Kingdom: Animalia
- Phylum: Chordata
- Class: Reptilia
- Order: Squamata
- Suborder: Gekkota
- Family: Sphaerodactylidae
- Genus: Sphaerodactylus
- Species: S. leonardovaldesi

Binomial name
- Sphaerodactylus leonardovaldesi McCranie & Hedges, 2012

Species of lizard

Sphaerodactylus leonardovaldesi is a species of lizard in the family Sphaerodactylidae. The species is endemic to the island of Roatán in Honduras.

== Etymology ==
The specific name, leonardovaldesi, is in honor of Honduran biologist Leonardo Valdés Orellana.

== Description ==
S. leonardovaldesi may attain a snout-to-vent length (SVL) of 26.8 mm (1.06 in).
