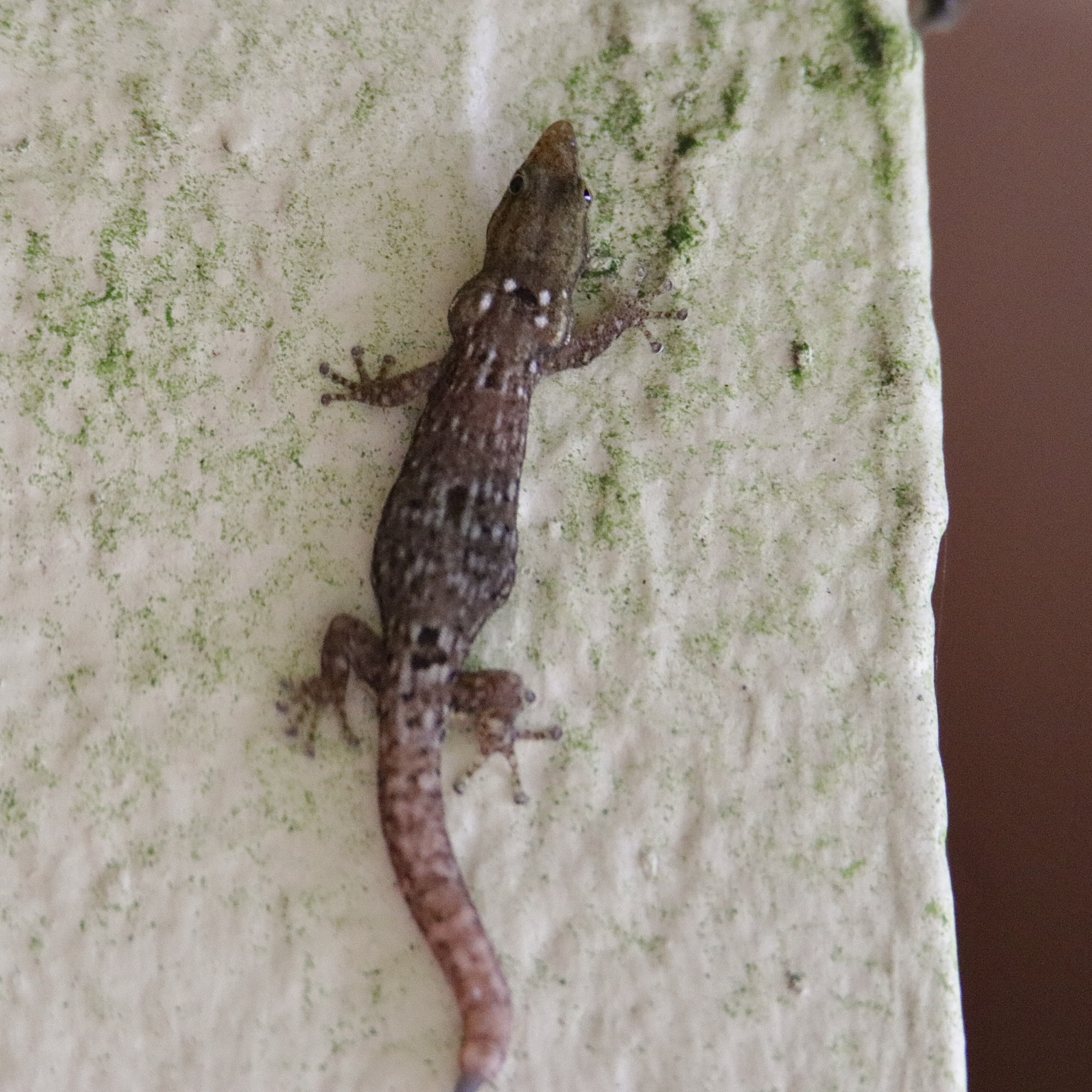

Conservation status
- Least Concern (IUCN 3.1)

Scientific classification
- Domain: Eukaryota
- Kingdom: Animalia
- Phylum: Chordata
- Class: Reptilia
- Order: Squamata
- Infraorder: Gekkota
- Family: Sphaerodactylidae
- Genus: Sphaerodactylus
- Species: S. lineolatus

Binomial name
- Sphaerodactylus lineolatus Lichtenstein & Von Martens, 1856

= Panama least gecko =

Species of lizard

The Panama least gecko (Sphaerodactylus lineolatus) is a species of lizard in the family Sphaerodactylidae. It is endemic to Panama and Colombia.
