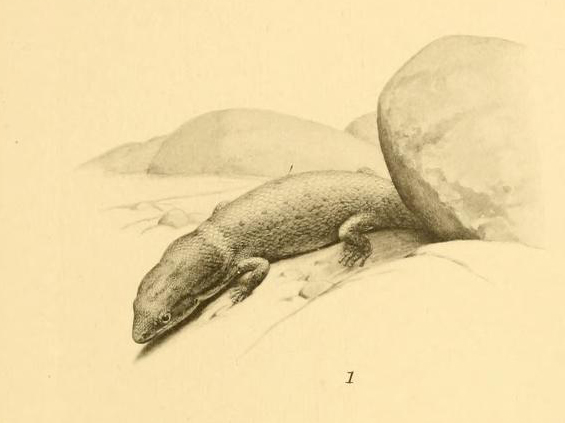

Conservation status
- Data Deficient (IUCN 3.1)

Scientific classification
- Kingdom: Animalia
- Phylum: Chordata
- Class: Reptilia
- Order: Squamata
- Suborder: Gekkota
- Family: Sphaerodactylidae
- Genus: Sphaerodactylus
- Species: S. gilvitorques

Binomial name
- Sphaerodactylus gilvitorques Cope, 1862

= Sphaerodactylus gilvitorques =

Species of lizard

Sphaerodactylus gilvitorques, also known as the Jamaican collared sphaero or Jamaican least gecko, is a species of lizard in the family Sphaerodactylidae. It is endemic to Jamaica.
