= Sphaerodactylus alphus =

Scientific classification
- Kingdom: Animalia
- Phylum: Chordata
- Class: Reptilia
- Order: Squamata
- Suborder: Gekkota
- Family: Sphaerodactylidae
- Genus: Sphaerodactylus
- Species: S. alphus

Binomial name
- Sphaerodactylus alphus McCranie & Hedges, 2013

Species of lizard

Sphaerodactylus alphus is a species of lizard in the family Sphaerodactylidae. It is endemic to Islas de la Bahía in Honduras.
