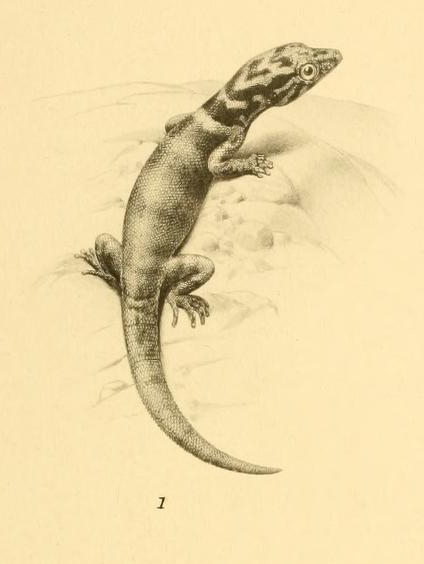
- 1921 illustration of specimen from Saint Lucia

Scientific classification
- Domain: Eukaryota
- Kingdom: Animalia
- Phylum: Chordata
- Class: Reptilia
- Order: Squamata
- Infraorder: Gekkota
- Family: Sphaerodactylidae
- Genus: Sphaerodactylus
- Species: S. microlepis

Binomial name
- Sphaerodactylus microlepis Reinhardt & Lütken, 1862

Subspecies
- S. m. microlepis; S. m. thomasi

Synonyms
- Sphaerodactylus melanospilos

= Little-scaled least gecko =

Little-scaled Least Gecko

Species of lizard

The little-scaled least gecko (Sphaerodactylus microlepis) is a gecko species mainly found on the Caribbean island of Saint Lucia, where it was once thought to be endemic. It has falsely been recorded on St. Croix, Martinique, Monito Island, the British Virgin Islands, and Costa Rica, but does not exist there.

Both sexes reach a length of 34 mm snout-to-vent. Its color pattern is variable, usually with six or seven dark bands between its limbs and a light brown or gray ground color; these markings may fade in some adults. Its tail is bright pink to pale orange with ladder-shaped markings. Its ventral surface is white or yellow, with dark stripes extending from its chin to its throat or chest. The top of its head is light brown or yellow, with dark stripes extending from behind its eyes and joining behind its neck.
