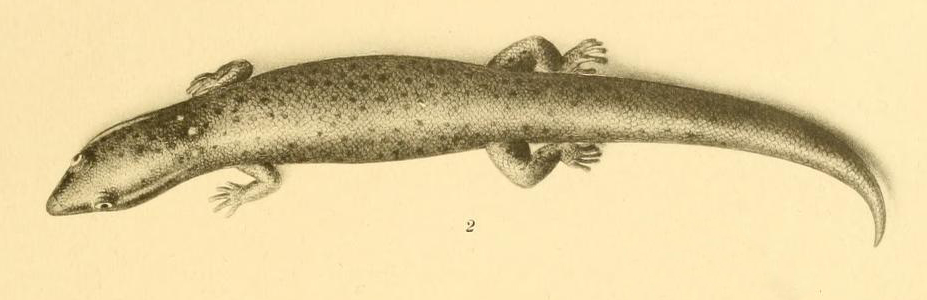

Conservation status
- Least Concern (IUCN 3.1)

Scientific classification
- Kingdom: Animalia
- Phylum: Chordata
- Class: Reptilia
- Order: Squamata
- Suborder: Gekkota
- Family: Sphaerodactylidae
- Genus: Sphaerodactylus
- Species: S. nigropunctatus

Binomial name
- Sphaerodactylus nigropunctatus Gray, 1845

= Sphaerodactylus nigropunctatus =

Species of lizard

Sphaerodactylus nigropunctatus, also known as the black-spotted least gecko or three-banded sphaero, is a species of lizard in the family Sphaerodactylidae. It is found in the Bahamas and Cuba.
