= Eastern least gecko =

Conservation status
- Least Concern (IUCN 3.1)

Scientific classification
- Kingdom: Animalia
- Phylum: Chordata
- Class: Reptilia
- Order: Squamata
- Suborder: Gekkota
- Family: Sphaerodactylidae
- Genus: Sphaerodactylus
- Species: S. leucaster

Binomial name
- Sphaerodactylus leucaster Schwartz, 1973

Species of lizard

The eastern least gecko (Sphaerodactylus leucaster) is a species of lizard in the family Sphaerodactylidae. It is endemic to the Dominican Republic.
