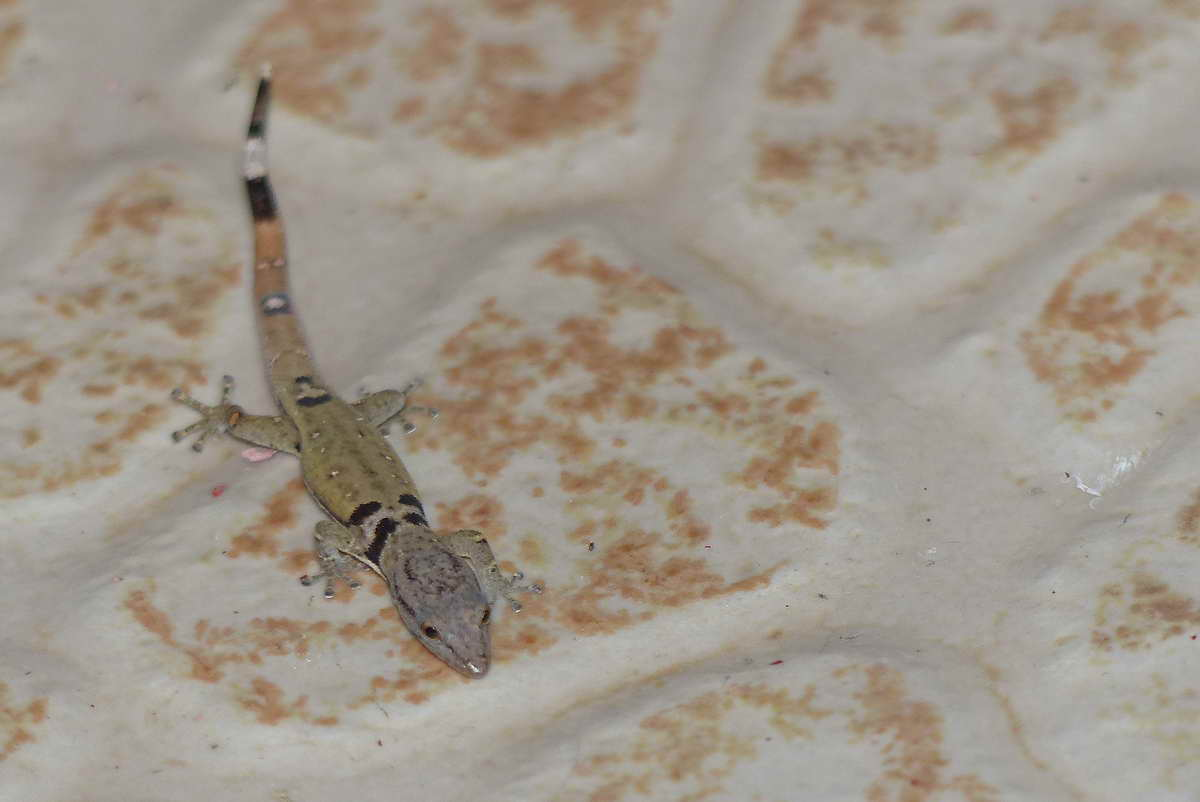

Scientific classification
- Domain: Eukaryota
- Kingdom: Animalia
- Phylum: Chordata
- Class: Reptilia
- Order: Squamata
- Infraorder: Gekkota
- Family: Sphaerodactylidae
- Genus: Sphaerodactylus
- Species: S. continentalis

Binomial name
- Sphaerodactylus continentalis Werner, 1896

= Sphaerodactylus continentalis =

Species of lizard

Sphaerodactylus continentalis is a species of lizard in the family Sphaerodactylidae. It is found in Honduras and southern Mexico.
