= List of endangered animals of North America =

As of May 16, 2024, the United States Environmental Protection Agency listed approximately 1,300 animal species as endangered or threatened in North America.

Note: This list is intended only for species listed as endangered under the United States Endangered Species Act (ESA) and the United States Fish and Wildlife Service, not species listed as endangered by other countries or agencies such as the International Union for the Conservation of Nature (IUCN).

Below is a partial list:

== Mammals ==
- Alouatta coibensis (Colba Island howler)
- Alouatta palliata (mantled howler)
- Alouatta pigra (Guatemalan black howler)
- Ammospermophilus nelsoni (San Joaquin antelope squirrel)
- Antilocapra americana peninsularis (Baja California pronghorn)
- Antilocapra americana sonoriensis (Sonoran pronghorn)
- Aplodontia rufa nigra (Mendocino County mountain beaver)
- Ateles fusciceps (black-headed spider monkey)
- Ateles geoffroyi (Geoffroy's spider monkey)
- Atopogale cubana (Cuban solenodon)
- Balaenoptera borealis (sei whale)
- Balaenoptera musculus (blue whale)
- Balaenoptera physalus (fin whale)
- Bison bison athabascae (wood bison)
- Bradypus pygmaeus (pygmy three-toed sloth)
- Canis lupus baileyi (Mexican wolf)
- Canis lupus manningi (Baffin Island wolf)
- Canis lupus orion (Greenland wolf)
- Canis rufus (red wolf)
- Corynorhinus townsendii ingens (Ozark big-eared bat)
- Corynorhinus townsendii virginianus (Virginia big-eared bat)
- Cryptotis endersi (Enders's small-eared shrew)
- Cryptotis griseoventris (Guatemalan broad-clawed shrew)
- Cryptotis nelsoni (Nelson's small-eared shrew)
- Cynomys mexicanus (Mexican prairie dog)
- Cynomys parvidens (Utah prairie dog)
- Dasyprocta coibae (Coiban agouti)
- Dasyprocta ruatanica (Ruatan Island agouti)
- Delphinapterus leucas (Cook Inlet Beluga whale)
- Dipodomys heermanni morroensis (Morro Bay kangaroo rat)
- Dipodomys ingens (giant kangaroo rat)
- Dipodomys merriami parvus (San Bernardino Merriam's kangaroo rat)
- Dipodomys nitratoides (kangaroo rat) (vulnerable)
- Dipodomys stephensi (Stephens's kangaroo rat)
- Enhydra lutris nereis (southern sea otter)
- Eschrichtius robustus (gray whale)
- Eubalaena glacialis (North Atlantic right whale)
- Eubalaena japonica (North Pacific right whale) Hawaiian Islands, Alaska, Northeast Pacific
- Eumetopias jubatus (Steller sea lion) Western Distinct Population Segment only (Alaska)
- Eumops floridanus (Florida bonneted bat)
- Geocapromys brownii (Jamaican coney)
- Geomys tropicalis (tropical pocket gopher)
- Glaucomys sabrinus coloratus (Carolina northern flying squirrel)
- Lasiurus cinereus semotus (Hawaiian hoary bat)
- Herpailurus yagouaroundi cacomitli (Gulf Coast jaguarundi)
- Herpailurus yagouaroundi panamensis (Panamanian jaguarundi)
- Herpailurus yagouaroundi tolteca (Sinaloan jaguarundi)
- Leopardus pardalis (ocelot)
- Leopardus wiedii (margay)
- Leptonycteris curasoae yerbabuenae (lesser long-nosed bat)
- Leptonycteris nivalis (Mexican long-nosed bat)
- Leptonycteris yerbabuenae (Lesser long-nosed bat)
- Lepus flavigularis (Tehuantepec jackrabbit)
- Lynx canadensis (Canada lynx)
- Lynx rufus escuinapae (Mexican bobcat)
- Marmota vancouverensis (Vancouver Island marmot)
- Megaptera novaeangliae (humpback whale)
- Mesocapromys angelcabrerai (Cabrera's hutia)
- Mesocapromys auritus (eared hutia)
- Mesocapromys nanus (dwarf hutia)
- Mesocapromys sanfelipensis (San Felipe hutia)
- Microtus californicus scirpensis (amargosa vole)
- Microtus mexicanus hualpaiensis (Hualpai Mexican vole)
- Microtus oaxacensis (tarabundí vole)
- Microtus pennsylvanicus dukecampbelli (Florida salt marsh vole)
- Microtus umbrosus (zempoaltépec vole)
- Mustela nigripes (black-footed ferret)
- Myotis peninsularis (peninsular myotis)
- Myotis planiceps (flat-headed myotis)
- Myotis sodalis (Indiana bat)
- Mysateles garridoi (Garrido's hutia)
- Mysateles meridionalis (southern hutia)
- Nasua narica nelsoni (Cozumel Island coati)
- Neomonachus schauinslandi (Hawaiian monk seal)
- Neotoma floridana smalli (Key Largo woodrat)
- Neotoma fuscipes riparia (riparian woodrat)
- Odocoileus hemionus cerrosensis (Cedros Island mule deer)
- Odocoileus virginianus clavium (Key deer)
- Odocoileus virginianus leucurus (Columbian white-tailed deer)
- Oryzomys palustris natator (rice rat)
- Orcinus orca (orca)
- Orthogeomys lanius (big pocket gopher)
- Ovis canadensis californiana (California bighorn sheep)
- Ovis canadensis nelsoni (peninsular bighorn sheep)
- Ovis canadensis sierrae (Sierra Nevada bighorn sheep)
- Panthera onca (jaguar)
- Pappogeomys alcorni (Alcorn's pocket gopher)
- Perognathus longimembris pacificus (Pacific pocket mouse)
- Peromyscus gossypinus allapaticola (Key Largo cotton mouse)
- Phocoena sinus (vaquita)
- Physeter macrocephalus (sperm whale)
- Plagiodontia aedium (Hispaniolan hutia)
- Procyon lotor maynardi (Bahamian raccoon)
- Procyon pygmaeus (Cozumel raccoon)
- Puma concolor couguar (Florida panther)
- Puma concolor couguar (North American cougar) Ontario, New Brunswick
- Rangifer tarandus caribou (woodland caribou)
- Rangifer tarandus pearyi (Peary caribou)
- Reithrodontomys raviventris (salt marsh harvest mouse)
- Rhogeessa genowaysi (Genoways's yellow bat)
- Sciurus niger cinereus (Delmarva Peninsula fox squirrel)
- Sorex ornatus relictus (Buena Vista Lake ornate shrew)
- Sorex pribilofensis (Pribilof Island shrew)
- Sorex sclateri (Sclater's shrew)
- Sorex stizodon (San Cristobal shrew)
- Spermophilus atricapillus (Baja California rock squirrel)
- Sylvilagus bachmani riparius (brush rabbit)
- Sylvilagus dicei (Dice's cottontail)
- Sylvilagus graysoni (Tres Marias cottontail)
- Sylvilagus insonus (Omilteme cottontail)
- Sylvilagus palustris hefneri (Lower Keys marsh rabbit)
- Sylvilagus robustus (robust cottontail)
- Tamias palmeri (Palmer's chipmunk)
- Tamiasciurus fremonti grahamensis (Mount Graham red squirrel)
- Tapirus bairdii (Baird's tapir)
- Trichechus manatus (West Indian manatee)
- Urocitellus brunneus (Northern Idaho ground squirrel)
- Urocyon littoralis catalinae (Santa Catalina island fox)
- Urocyon littoralis littoralis (San Miguel island fox)
- Urocyon littoralis santacruzae (Santa Cruz island fox)
- Urocyon littoralis santarosae (Santa Rosa island fox)
- Ursus arctos horribilis (grizzly bear) Listed as threatened in lower 48 states only. Other distinct population segments are secure or experimental.
- Vulpes macrotis mutica (San Joaquin kit fox)
- Vulpes velox hebes (northern swift fox)
- Xerospermophilus perotensis (Perote ground squirrel)
- Zygogeomys trichopus (Michoacan pocket gopher)

== Birds ==
- Agelaius xanthomus (yellow-shouldered blackbird)
- Amazona imperialis (imperial amazon)
- Amazona vittata (Puerto Rican amazon)
- Antrostomus noctitherus (Puerto Rican nightjar)
- Buteo ridgwayi (Ridgway's hawk)
- Campephilus principalis (ivory-billed woodpecker)
- Catharopeza bishopi (whistling warbler)
- Chondrohierax wilsonii (Cuban kite)
- Coccyzus rufigularis (bay-breasted cuckoo)
- Colinus virginianus ridgwayi (masked bobwhite)
- Ferminia cerverai (Zapata rail)
- Geotrygon leucometopia (white-fronted quail-dove)
- Grus americana (whooping crane)
- Gymnogyps californianus (California condor)
- Icterus northropi (Bahama oriole)
- Leptotila wellsi (Grenada dove)
- Leucopeza semperi (Semper's warbler)
- Leuconotopicus borealis (red-cockaded woodpecker)
- Loxia megaplaga (Hispaniolan crossbill)
- Melanospiza richardsoni (Saint Lucia black finch)
- Mimus graysoni (Socorro mockingbird)
- Nesopsar nigerrimus (Jamaican blackbird)
- Oceanodroma macrodactyla (Guadalupe storm petrel)
- Oreophasis derbianus (horned guan)
- Patagioenas inornata wetmorei (Puerto Rican plain pigeon)
- Pterodroma cahow (Bermuda petrel)
- Pterodroma caribbaea (Jamaican petrel)
- Pterodroma hasitata (black-capped petrel)
- Ramphocinclus brachyurus (white-breasted thrasher)
- Siphonorhis americana (Jamaican poorwill)
- Setophaga angelae (elfin woods warbler)
- Setophaga kirtlandii (Kirtland's warbler)
- Sitta pusilla insularis (Bahama nuthatch)
- Starnoenas cyanocephala (blue-headed quail-dove)
- Tachycineta cyaneoviridis (Bahama swallow)
- Toxostoma guttatum (Cozumel thrasher)
- Tyrannus cubensis (giant kingbird)
- Vermivora bachmanii (Bachman's warbler)

== Reptiles ==
- Anolis roosevelti (Culebra Island giant anole)
- Borikenophis sanctaecrucis (Saint Croix racer)
- Caretta caretta (loggerhead sea turtle)
- Chelonia mydas (green sea turtle)
- Chilabothrus monensis (Virgin Islands tree boa)
- Clemmys guttata (spotted turtle)
- Clemmys muhlenbergii (bog turtle)
- Crocodylus acutus (American crocodile)
- Crocodylus moreletii (Morelet's crocodile)
- Crocodylus rhombifer (Cuban crocodile)
- Crotalus catalinensis (Catalina rattlesnake)
- Crotalus pusillus (Tancitarian dusky rattlesnake)
- Crotalus unicolor (Aruba rattlesnake)
- Crotalus willardi obscurus (New Mexican ridge-nosed rattlesnake)
- Cyclura carinata bartschi (Bartsch's iguana)
- Cyclura carinata carinata (Turks and Caicos rock iguana)
- Cyclura cychlura cychlura (Andros iguana)
- Cyclura cychlura figginsi (Exuma Island iguana)
- Cyclura cychlura inornata (Allen Cays rock iguana)
- Cyclura collei (Jamaican iguana)
- Cyclura cornuta cornuta (rhinoceros iguana)
- Cyclura cornuta stejnegeri (Mona ground iguana)
- Cyclura lewisi (blue iguana)
- Cyclura nubila caymanensis (lesser Caymans iguana)
- Cyclura pinguis (Anegada ground iguana)
- Cyclura ricordii (Ricord's ground iguana)
- Cyclura rileyi cristata (White Cay iguana)
- Cyclura rileyi nuchalis (Acklins ground iguana)
- Cyclura rileyi rileyi (Bahamian rock iguana)
- Dermatemys mawii (Central American river turtle)
- Dermochelys coriacea (leatherback sea turtle)
- Drymarchon couperi (eastern indigo snake)
- Eretmochelys imbricata (hawksbill sea turtle)
- Gambelia silus (blunt-nosed leopard lizard)
- Glyptemys insculpta (wood turtle)
- Gopherus agassizii (desert tortoise)
- Gopherus flavomarginatus (Bolson tortoise)
- Gopherus polyphemus (gopher tortoise)
- Graptemys flavimaculata (yellow-blotched map turtle)
- Graptemys oculifera (ringed map turtle)
- Heloderma suspectum (Gila monster)
- Iguana delicatissima (Lesser Antillean iguana)
- Lepidochelys kempii (Kemp's ridley sea turtle)
- Lepidochelys olivacea (olive ridley sea turtle)
- Mabuya hispaniolae (Hispaniolan two-lined skink)
- Macrochelys temminckii (alligator snapping turtle)
- Masticophis lateralis euryxanthus (Alameda whipsnake)
- Pholidoscelis polops (St. Croix ground lizard)
- Pseudemys alabamensis (Alabama red-belly turtle)
- Sauromalus varius (San Esteban Island chuckwalla)
- Sphaerodactylus armasi (Guantanamo least gecko)
- Sphaerodactylus callocricus (callous least gecko)
- Sphaerodactylus cochranae (Cochran's least gecko)
- Sphaerodactylus epiurus (Hispaniolan tailspot sphaero)
- Sphaerodactylus intermedius (Mantanzas least gecko)
- Sphaerodactylus ladae (Martin Garcia least gecko)
- Sphaerodactylus micropithecus (Monito gecko)
- Sphaerodactylus ocoae (Peravia least gecko)
- Sphaerodactylus oliveri (Juventud least gecko)
- Sphaerodactylus perissodactylius (Dominican least gecko)
- Sphaerodactylus pimienta (pepper sphaero)
- Sphaerodactylus plummeri (Barahona big-scaled sphaero)
- Sphaerodactylus randi (Pedernales least gecko)
- Sphaerodactylus rhabdotus (Valle de Neiba least gecko)
- Sphaerodactylus ruibali (Ruibal's least gecko)
- Sphaerodactylus samanensis (Samana least gecko)
- Sphaerodactylus schuberti (Neiba agave sphaero)
- Sphaerodactylus schwartzi (Guantanamo collared sphaero)
- Sphaerodactylus storeyae (Los Canarreos geckolet)
- Sphaerodactylus torrei (Barbour's least gecko)
- Sternotherus depressus (flattened musk turtle)
- Terrapene coahuila (aquatic box turtle)
- Thamnophis gigas (giant garter snake)
- Thamnophis sirtalis tetrataenia (San Francisco garter snake)
- Tropidophis hendersoni (Cuban khaki dwarf boa)
- Typhlops syntherus (Barahona Peninsula blindsnake)
- Uma inornata (Coachella Valley fringe-toed lizard)

== Amphibians ==
- Ambystoma bishopi (reticulated flatwoods salamander)
- Ambystoma californiense (California tiger salamander)
- Ambystoma cingulatum (frosted flatwoods salamander)
- Anaxyrus houstonensis (Houston toad)
- Eleutherodactylus alcoae (Barahona rock frog)
- Eleutherodactylus auriculatoides
- Eleutherodactylus haitianus
- Eleutherodactylus heminota (half-stripe bromeliad frog)
- Eleutherodactylus hypostenor (Baoruco burrowing frog)
- Eleutherodactylus jasperi (golden coquí)
- Eleutherodactylus minutus (tiny robber frog)
- Eleutherodactylus montanus (Dominican mountain robber frog)
- Eleutherodactylus patriciae
- Eleutherodactylus pituinus
- Eleutherodactylus probolaeus
- Eleutherodactylus ruthae (Ruth's robber frog)
- Eurycea sosorum (Barton Springs salamander)
- Osteopilus pulchrilineatus (Hispaniolan yellow tree frog)
- Osteopilus vastus (Hispaniolan giant tree frog)
- Peltophryne guentheri (southern crested toad)
- Plethodon shenandoah (Shenandoah salamander)
- Rana muscosa (mountain yellow-legged frog)
- Rana sierrae (Sierra Nevada Mountain yellow-legged frog)
- Typhlomolge rathbuni (Texas blind salamander )

== Insects and arachnids ==
- Apodemia mormo langei (Lange's metalmark butterfly)
- Boloria acrocnema (Uncompahgre fritillary butterfly)
- Brychius hungerfordi (Hungerford's crawling water beetle)
- Cicindela nevadica lincolniana (Salt Creek tiger beetle)
- Cicindela ohlone (Ohlone tiger beetle)
- Euphilotes battoides allyni (El Segundo blue butterfly)
- Euphilotes enoptes smithi (Smith's blue butterfly)
- Euphydryas editha quino (Quino checkerspot butterfly)
- Icaricia icarioides (Boisduval's blue butterfly)
- Microhexura montivaga (spruce-fir moss spider)
- Neonympha mitchellii (Mitchell's satyr butterfly)
- Nicrophorus americanus (American burying beetle)
- Plebejus melissa samuelis (Karner blue butterfly)
- Pyrgus ruralis lagunae (Laguna Mountains skipper)
- Speyeria callippe callippe (callippe silverspot butterfly)
- Texamaurops reddelli (Kretschmarr Cave mold beetle)
- Texella reddelli (Bee Creek cave harvestman)
- Trimerotropis infantilis (Zayante band-winged grasshopper)
- Hylaeus longiceps (Hawaiian yellow-faced bee)

== Fish ==
- Acipenser brevirostrum (shortnose sturgeon)
- Acipenser oxyrinchus desotoi (Gulf sturgeon)
- Amblyopsis rosae (Ozark cavefish)
- Anguilla rostrata (American eel)
- Catostomus microps (Modoc sucker)
- Catostomus santaanae (Santa Ana sucker)
- Catostomus warnerensis (Warner sucker)
- Carcharhinus longimanus (oceanic whitetip shark)
- Carcharhinus obscurus (Dusky shark)
- Carcharodon carcharias (great white shark)
- Cetorhinus maximus (basking shark)
- Chasmistes brevirostris (shortnose sucker)
- Chasmistes cujus (cui-ui)
- Chasmistes liorus (June sucker)
- Crenichthys baileyi baileyi (White River springfish)
- Crenichthys baileyi grandis (Hiko White River springfish)
- Crenichthys nevadae (Railroad Valley springfish)
- Crystallaria cincotta (diamond darter)
- Cyprinella caerulea (blue shiner)
- Cyprinella formosa (beautiful shiner)
- Cyprinodon bovinus (Leon Springs pupfish)
- Cyprinodon diabolis (Devils Hole pupfish)
- Cyprinodon elegans (Comanche Springs pupfish)
- Cyprinodon macularius (desert pupfish)
- Cyprinodon radiosus (Owens pupfish)
- Deltistes luxatus (Lost River sucker)
- Dionda diaboli (Devils River minnow)
- Epinephelus striatus (Nassau grouper)
- Eremichthys acros (desert dace)
- Erimystax cahni (slender chub)
- Etheostoma boschungi (slackwater darter)
- Etheostoma nuchale (watercress darter)
- Etheostoma okaloosae (Okaloosa darter)
- Etheostoma wapiti (boulder darter)
- Eucyclogobius newberryi (tidewater goby)
- Fundulus julisia (Barrens topminnow)
- Gambusia dominicensis (Dominican gambusia)
- Gambusia gaigei (Big Bend gambusia)
- Gambusia heterochir (Clear Creek gambusia)
- Gambusia nobilis (Pecos gambusia)
- Gila bicolor mohavensis (Mohave tui chub)
- Gila boraxobius (Borax Lake chub)
- Gila cypha (humpback chub)
- Gila ditaenia (Sonora chub)
- Gila elegans (bonytail chub)
- Gila intermedia (Gila chub)
- Gila nigrescens (Chihuahua chub)
- Gila purpurea (Yaqui chub)
- Gila seminuda (Virgin River chub)
- Hybognathus amarus (Rio Grande silvery minnow)
- Hypomesus transpacificus (delta smelt)
- Ictalurus pricei (Yaqui catfish)
- Isurus oxyrinchus (shortfin mako shark)
- Isurus paucus (longfin mako shark)
- Lepidomeda albivallis (White River spinedace)
- Lepidomeda vittata (Little Colorado spinedace)
- Meda fulgida (spikedace)
- Moapa coriacea (moapa dace)
- Notropis cahabae (Cahaba shiner)
- Notropis mekistocholas (Cape Fear shiner)
- Noturus flavipinnis (yellowfin madtom)
- Noturus stanauli (pygmy madtom)
- Noturus trautmani (Scioto madtom)
- Oncorhynchus apache (Apache trout) (threatened)
- Oncorhynchus clarki henshawi (Lahontan cutthroat trout) (threatened)
- Oncorhynchus clarki seleniris (Paiute cutthroat trout) (threatened)
- Oncorhynchus clarki stomias (greenback cutthroat trout) (threatened)
- Oncorhynchus gilae (Gila trout) (threatened)
- Oncorhynchus keta (chum salmon) Two evolutionary significant units (ESU) of chum have been listed as threatened. These are the Hood Canal Summer Run population and the Lower Columbia River Population. The Pacific Coast ESU and Puget Sound/Strait of Georgia ESU are secure.
- Oregonichthys crameri (Oregon chub)
- Percina antesella (amber darter)
- Percina aurolineata (goldline darter)
- Percina jenkinsi (Conasauga logperch)
- Percina pantherina (leopard darter)
- Percina rex (Roanoke logperch)
- Percina tanasi (snail darter)
- Phoxinus cumberlandensis (blackside dace)
- Plagopterus argentissimus (woundfin)
- Poecilia latipunctata (broadspotted molly)
- Poecilia sulphuraria (sulphur molly)
- Poeciliopsis occidentalis (Gila topminnow)
- Pristis pectinata (smalltooth sawfish)
- Pristis pristis (largetooth sawfish)
- Ptychocheilus lucius (Colorado pikeminnow)
- Salvelinus confluentus (bull trout) (threatened)
- Scaphirhynchus albus (pallid sturgeon)
- Scaphirhynchus suttkusi (Alabama sturgeon)
- Speoplatyrhinus poulsoni (Alabama cavefish)
- Sphyrna lewini (scalloped hammerhead)
- Tiaroga cobitis (loach minnow)
- Xyrauchen texanus (razorback sucker)

== Crustaceans ==
- Orconectes shoupi (Nashville crayfish)

== See also ==
- List of endangered plants of North America
