= Richard Thomas (herpetologist) =

American taxonomist and systematist (born 1938)

- Born: John Paul Richard Thomas; May 2, 1938 (age 88); Jacksonville, Florida
- Education: University of South Florida; Louisiana State University
- Known for: Describing over 60 animal species, including the common coquí
- Scientific career
- Fields: Taxonomy, systematics, herpetology, evolution
- Workplaces: University of Puerto Rico, Río Piedras Campus

John Paul Richard Thomas (born 1938) is an American taxonomist and systematist, and retired professor of herpetology and evolution at University of Puerto Rico-Rio Piedras (San Juan, Puerto Rico). He described several species new to science, mostly amphibians and reptiles, from throughout the Caribbean islands including the common coquí (Eleutherodactlys coqui), the national animal of Puerto Rico.

== Early life and education ==
Thomas was born in Jacksonville, Florida, USA, on May 2, 1938. At the University of South Florida, Thomas graduated as a Bachelor of Arts in 1969. Later, he went to Louisiana State University and obtained a PhD in 1976.

== Research ==
Thomas' research has focused mostly on amphibians and reptiles, spanning several fields from natural history to systematics and evolution. His studies have yielded descriptions of new species of dwarf geckos (Sphaerodactylus), blind snakes (Scolecophidia), and rain frogs (Eleutherodactylus).

== Taxonomic descriptions ==
During his career as herpetologist, Thomas has described more than 60 new species. A non-comprehensive list of described new species includes:

- Bachia panoplia Thomas, 1965
- Mitophis pyrites Thomas, 1965
- Sphaerodactylus parthenopion Thomas, 1965
- Typhlops syntherus Thomas, 1965
- Amphisbaena xera Thomas, 1966
- Eleutherodactylus coqui Thomas, 1966
- Eleutherodactylus schwartzi Thomas, 1966
- Sphaerodactylus elasmorhynchus Thomas, 1966
- Typhlops monastus Thomas, 1966
- Anolis rimarum Thomas & Schwartz, 1967
- Cubatyphlops epactius (Thomas, 1968)
- Celestus agasepsoides (Thomas, 1971)
- Amerotyphlops tasymicris Thomas, 1974
- Typhlops hectus Thomas, 1974
- Eleutherodactylus probolaeus Schwartz & Thomas, 1987
- Sphaerodactylus semasiops Thomas, 1975
- Sphaerodactylus cryphius Thomas & Schwartz, 1977
- Sphaerodactylus nycteropus Thomas & Schwartz, 1977
- Sphaerodactylus streptophorus Thomas & Schwartz, 1977
- Sibynomorphus oneilli Rossman & Thomas, 1979
- Bolitoglossa digitigrada Wake, Brame & Thomas, 1982
- Sphaerodactylus omoglaux Thomas, 1982
- Sphaerodactylus williamsi Thomas & Schwartz, 1983
- Mitophis asbolepis Thomas, McDiarmid & Thompson, 1985
- Mitophis calypso Thomas, McDiarmid & Thompson, 1985
- Mitophis leptipileptus Thomas, McDiarmid & Thompson, 1985
- Eleutherodactylus amadeus Hedges, Thomas & Franz, 1987
- Eleutherodactylus parapelates Hedges & Thomas, 1987
- Sphaerodactylus ladae Thomas & Hedges, 1988
- Sphaerodactylus perissodactylus Thomas & Hedges, 1988
- Anolis placidus Hedges & Thomas, 1989
- Celestus macrotus Thomas & Hedges, 1989
- Typhlops schwartzi Thomas, 1989
- Typhlops tetrathyreus Thomas, 1989
- Typhlops titanops Thomas, 1989
- Typhlops catapontus Hedges & Thomas, 1991
- Typhlops hypomethes Hedges & Thomas, 1991
- Eleutherodactylus caribe Hedges & Thomas, 1992
- Eleutherodactylus corona Hedges & Thomas, 1992
- Eleutherodactylus dolomedes Hedges & Thomas, 1992
- Eleutherodactylus guantanamera Hedges, Estrada & Thomas, 1992
- Eleutherodactylus ionthus Hedges, Estrada & Thomas, 1992
- Eleutherodactylus mariposa Hedges, Estrada & Thomas, 1992
- Eleutherodactylus melacara Hedges, Estrada & Thomas, 1992
- Sphaerodactylus cricoderus Thomas, Hedges & Garrido, 1992
- Sphaerodactylus schwartzi Thomas, Hedges & Garrido, 1992
- Sphaerodactylus plummeri Thomas & Hedges, 1992
- Sphaerodactylus epiurus Thomas & Hedges, 1993
- Amphisbaena carlgansi Thomas & Hedges, 1998
- Diploglossus garridoi Thomas & Hedges, 1998
- Sphaerodactylus pimienta Thomas, Hedges & Garrido, 1998
- Sphaerodactylus schuberti Thomas & Hedges, 1998
- Sphaerodactylus ariasae Hedges & Thomas, 2001
- Amphisbaena cayemite Thomas & Hedges, 2006
- Amphisbaena leali Thomas & Hedges, 2006
- Eleutherodactylus juanariveroi Rios-López & Thomas, 2007
- Typhlops agoralionis Thomas & Hedges, 2007
- Typhlops anchaurus Thomas & Hedges, 2007
- Typhlops anousius Thomas & Hedges, 2007
- Typhlops arator Thomas & Hedges, 2007
- Typhlops contorhinus Thomas & Hedges, 2007
- Typhlops eperopeus Thomas & Hedges, 2007
- Typhlops notorachius Thomas & Hedges, 2007
- Typhlops paradoxus Thomas & Hedges, 2007
- Typhlops perimychus Thomas & Hedges, 2007
- Typhlops proancylops Thomas & Hedges, 2007
- Typhlops satelles Thomas & Hedges, 2007
- Typhlops sylleptor Thomas & Hedges, 2007

Nota bene: A binomial authority in parentheses indicates that the species was originally described in a different genus.

== Eponyms ==
Richard Thomas is honored in the scientific names of several lizards, namely Liolaemus thomasi, Anolis equestris thomasi Schwartz 1958, Leiocephalus lunatus thomasi Schwartz 1967, and Sphaerodactylus microlepis thomasi Schwartz 1965.
