= List of amphibians of the Dominican Republic =

This is a list of amphibians found in the Dominican Republic. There is a total of 47 amphibian species recorded in the Dominican Republic. This list is derived from the database listing of AmphibiaWeb.

== Frogs and Toads (Anura) ==
=== Bufonidae ===
Order: Anura. Family: Bufonidae

- Peltophryne fluviatica (CR)
- Peltophryne fracta (EN)
- Peltophryne guentheri (VU)
- Rhinella marina (LC) (I)

=== Eleutherodactylidae ===
Order: Anura. Family: Eleutherodactylidae

- Eleutherodactylus abbotti (LC)
- Eleutherodactylus alcoae (EN)
- Eleutherodactylus aporostegus
- Eleutherodactylus armstrongi (EN)
- Eleutherodactylus audanti (VU)
- Eleutherodactylus auriculatoides (EN)
- Eleutherodactylus bothroboans
- Eleutherodactylus coqui (LC) (I)
- Eleutherodactylus diplasius
- Eleutherodactylus flavescens (NT)
- Eleutherodactylus fowleri (CR)
- Eleutherodactylus furcyensis (CR)
- Eleutherodactylus haitianus (EN)
- Eleutherodactylus heminota (EN)
- Eleutherodactylus hypostenor (EN)
- Eleutherodactylus inoptatus (LC)
- Eleutherodactylus jugans (CR)
- Eleutherodactylus leoncei (CR)
- Eleutherodactylus melatrigonum
- Eleutherodactylus minutus (EN)
- Eleutherodactylus montanus (EN)
- Eleutherodactylus nortoni (CR)
- Eleutherodactylus notidodes
- Eleutherodactylus parabates (CR)
- Eleutherodactylus paralius
- Eleutherodactylus patriciae (EN)
- Eleutherodactylus pictissimus (VU)
- Eleutherodactylus pituinus (EN)
- Eleutherodactylus probolaeus (EN)
- Eleutherodactylus rucillensis
- Eleutherodactylus rufifemoralis (CR)
- Eleutherodactylus ruthae (EN)
- Eleutherodactylus schmidti (CR)
- Eleutherodactylus sommeri
- Eleutherodactylus tychathrous
- Eleutherodactylus weinlandi (LC)
- Eleutherodactylus wetmorei (VU)

=== Hylidae ===
Order: Anura. Family: Hylidae

- Hypsiboas heilprini (VU)
- Osteopilus dominicensis (LC)
- Osteopilus pulchrilineatus (EN)
- Osteopilus vastus (EN)

=== Leptodactylidae ===
Order: Anura. Family: Leptodactylidae

- Leptodactylus albilabris (LC)

=== Ranidae ===
Order: Anura. Family: Ranidae

- Rana catesbeiana (LC) (I)

== See also ==
- List of amphibians of Hispaniola
