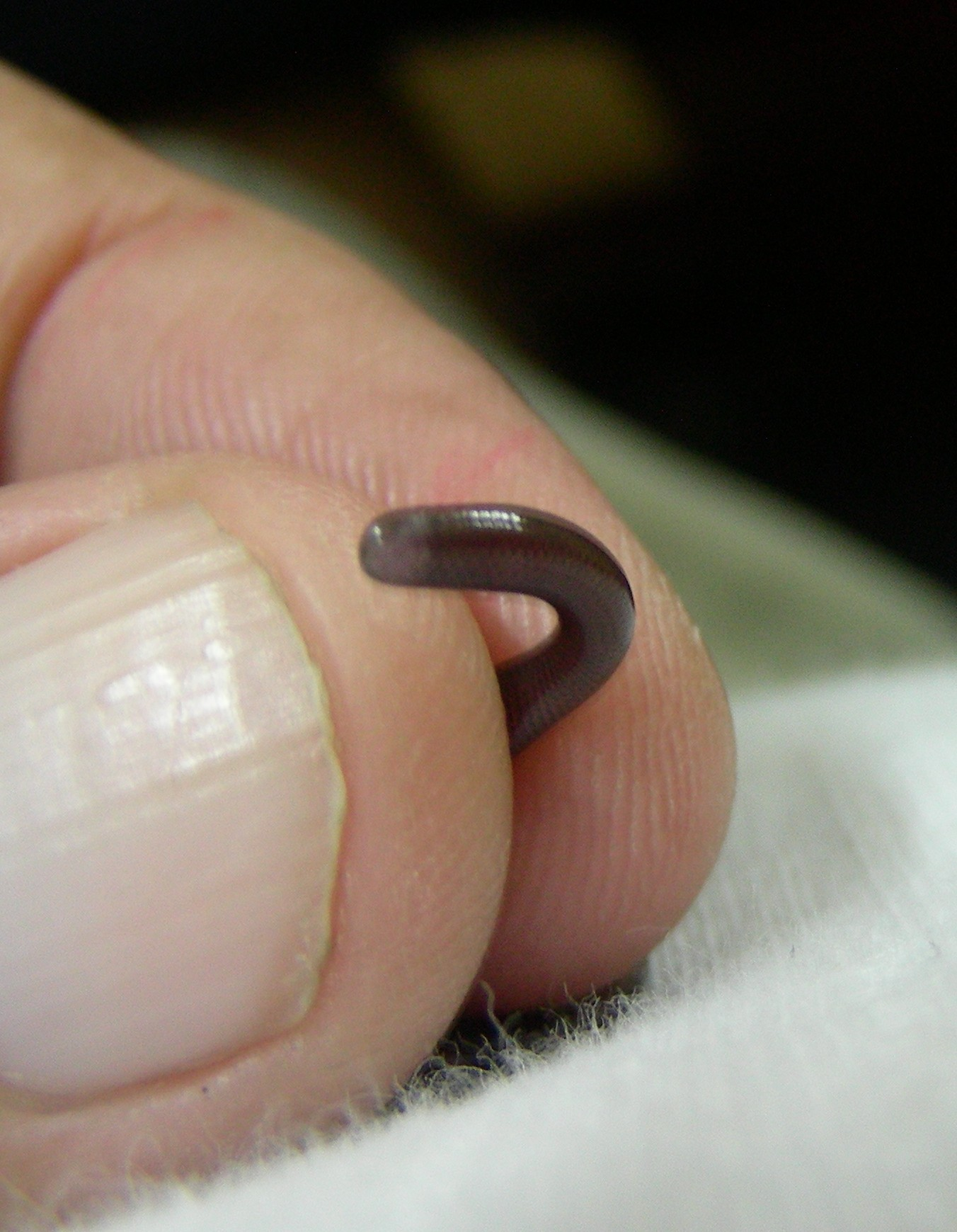

Scientific classification
- Kingdom: Animalia
- Phylum: Chordata
- Class: Reptilia
- Order: Squamata
- Suborder: Serpentes
- Infraorder: Scolecophidia
- Superfamily: Typhlopoidea
- Family: Typhlopidae
- Subfamily: Typhlopinae
- Genus: Typhlops; Oppel, 1811

Synonyms
- Typhlops Oppel, 1811; Tiphlops Rafinesque, 1815; Typhlops — Hemprich, 1820; Typhlos Bonaparte, 1831; Aspidorhynchus Fitzinger, 1843; Gerrhopilus Fitzinger, 1843; Ophthalmidion A.M.C. Duméril & Bibron, 1844; Cathetorhinus A.M.C. Duméril & Bibron, 1844; Anilios Gray, 1845; Argyrophis Gray, 1845; Meditoria Gray, 1845; Typhlops — Gistel, 1846; Diaphorotyphlops Jan in Jan & Sordelli, 1860; Typhlops — Boulenger, 1893; Typhlops — M.A. Smith, 1922; Ophthalmidium Loveridge, 1957

= Typhlops =

Genus of snakes

Typhlops is a genus of blind snakes in the family Typhlopidae. The genus is endemic to the West Indies. Some species which were formerly placed in the genus Typhlops have been moved to the genera Afrotyphlops, Amerotyphlops, Anilios, Antillotyphlops, Argyrophis, Cubatyphlops, Indotyphlops, Letheobia, Madatyphlops, Malayotyphlops, and Xerotyphlops.

== Species ==
Species	Taxon author	Subsp.*	Common name	Geographic range
T. agoralionis	Thomas & Hedges, 2007	0	la Hotte blind snake
T. capitulatus	Richmond, 1964	0	Haitian pale-lipped blind snake, Richmond's worm snake
T. eperopeus	Thomas & Hedges, 2007	0	Bahoruco blind snake
T. gonavensis	Richmond, 1964	0	Gonâve Island worm snake
T. guadeloupensis	Richmond, 1966	0	Guadeloupe blind snake, Guadeloupe worm snake
T. hectus	Thomas, 1974	0	Tiburon Peninsula blind snake, Thomas's worm snake
T. jamaicensis	(Shaw, 1802)	0	Jamaican blind snake, Jamaica worm snake
T. leptolepis	Domínguez, Fong & Iturriaga, 2013	0
T. lumbricalis^{T}	(Linnaeus, 1758)	0	earthworm blind snake
T. oxyrhinus	Domínguez & Díaz, 2011	0
T. pachyrhinus	Domínguez & Díaz, 2011	0
T. proancylops	Thomas & Hedges, 2007	0	La Selle blind snake
T. pusillus	Barbour, 1914	0	Hispaniola worm snake
T. rostellatus	Stejneger, 1904	0	Puerto Rican worm snake
T. schwartzi	Thomas, 1989	0	Schwartz's worm snake
T. silus	Legler, 1959	0
T. sulcatus	Cope, 1868	0	island worm snake
T. sylleptor	Thomas & Hedges, 2007	0	Pestel blind snake
T. syntherus	Thomas, 1965	0	Barahona Peninsula blind snake, Barahona worm snake
T. tetrathyreus	Thomas, 1989	0	Haitian worm snake
T. titanops	Thomas, 1989	0	titan worm snake

*) Not including the nominate subspecies.
^{T}) Type species.
