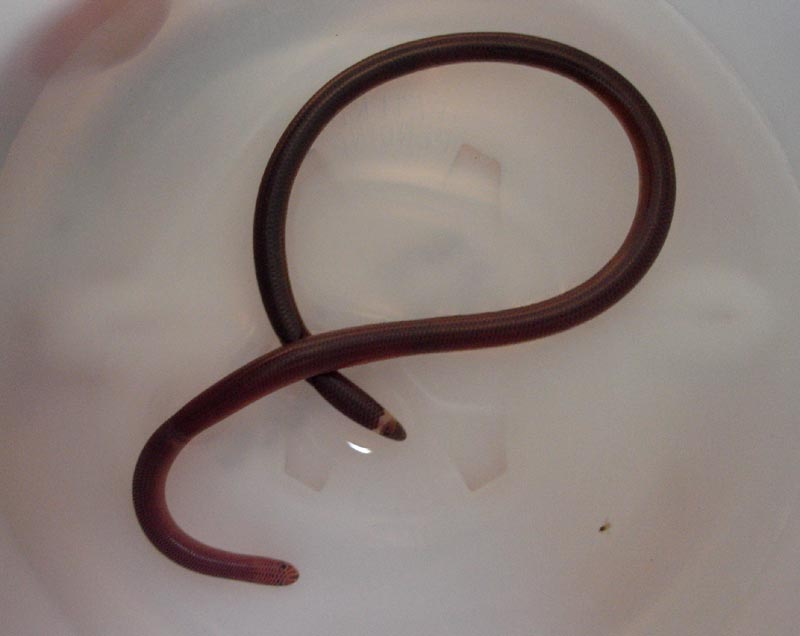
- Antillotyphlops platycephalus, flathead worm snake

Scientific classification
- Kingdom: Animalia
- Phylum: Chordata
- Class: Reptilia
- Order: Squamata
- Suborder: Serpentes
- Family: Typhlopidae
- Genus: Antillotyphlops; Hedges, Marion, Lipp, Marin & Vidal, 2014

= Antillotyphlops =

Genus of snakes

Antillotyphlops is a genus of snakes in the family Typhlopidae.

== Distribution ==
The 12 species of the genus Antillotyphlops are found on Caribbean islands.

== Species ==
The following species are recognized as being valid.

- Antillotyphlops annae (Breuil, 1999)
- Antillotyphlops catapontus (Thomas, 1966)
- Antillotyphlops dominicanus (Stejneger, 1904)
- Antillotyphlops geotomus (Thomas, 1966)
- Antillotyphlops granti (Ruthven & Gaige, 1935)
- Antillotyphlops guadeloupensis (Richmond, 1966)
- Antillotyphlops hypomethes (Hedges & Thomas, 1991)
- Antillotyphlops monastus (Thomas, 1966)
- Antillotyphlops monensis (Schmidt, 1926)
- Antillotyphlops naugus (Thomas, 1966)
- Antillotyphlops platycephalus (A.M.C. Duméril & Bibron, 1844)
- Antillotyphlops richardi (A.M.C. Duméril & Bibron, 1844)

Nota bene A binomial authority in parentheses indicates that the species was originally described in a genus other than Antillotyphlops.
