= Bend Whitewater Park =

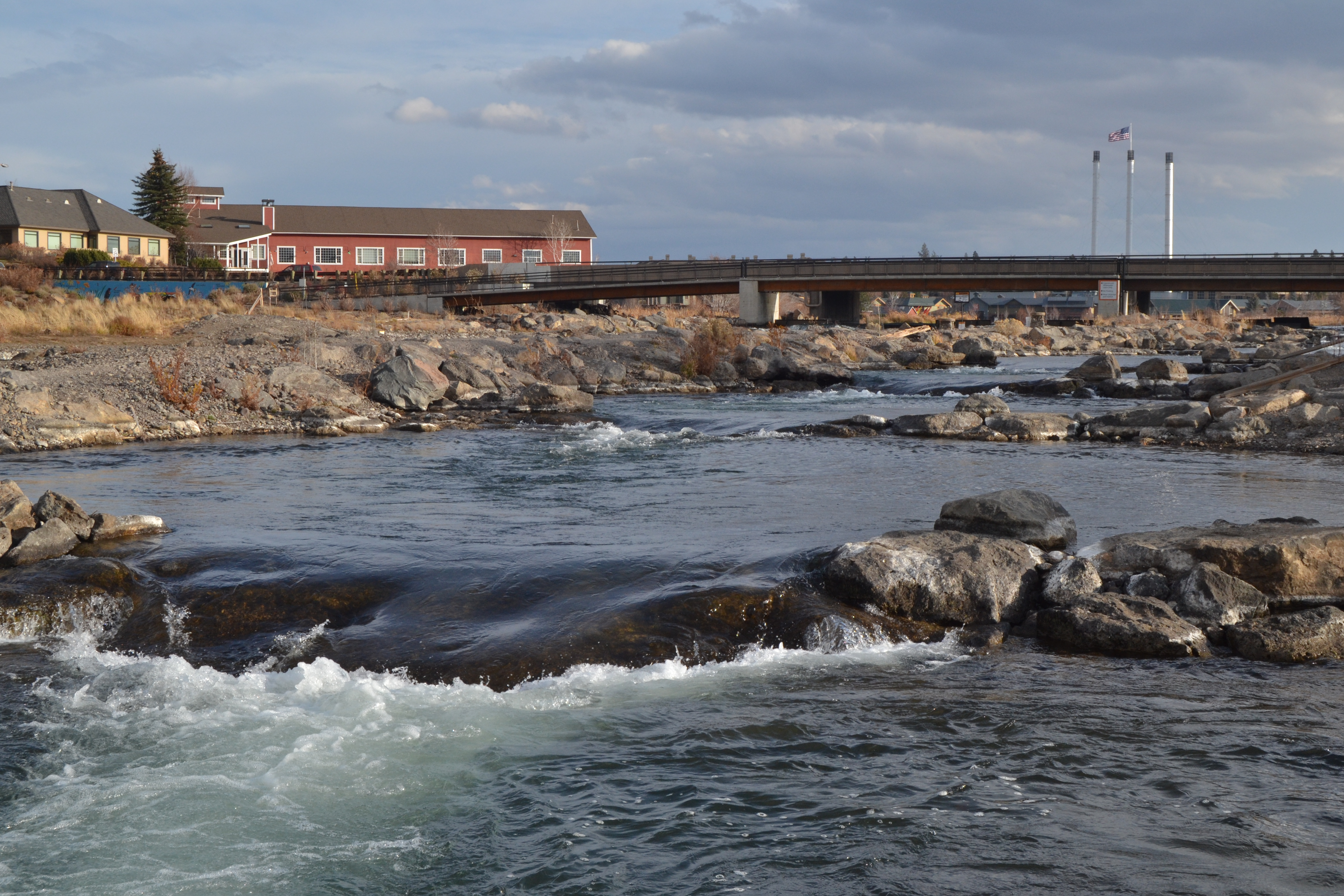
- View from the bottom of the passageway channel

- Location within Oregon
- Interactive map of Bend Whitewater Park
- Location: Bend, Oregon, U.S.
- Coordinates: 44.05029°N 121.32089°W
- Opened: September 2015

Bend Whitewater Park is a water recreation park in Bend, Oregon, in the United States.

== Description and history ==
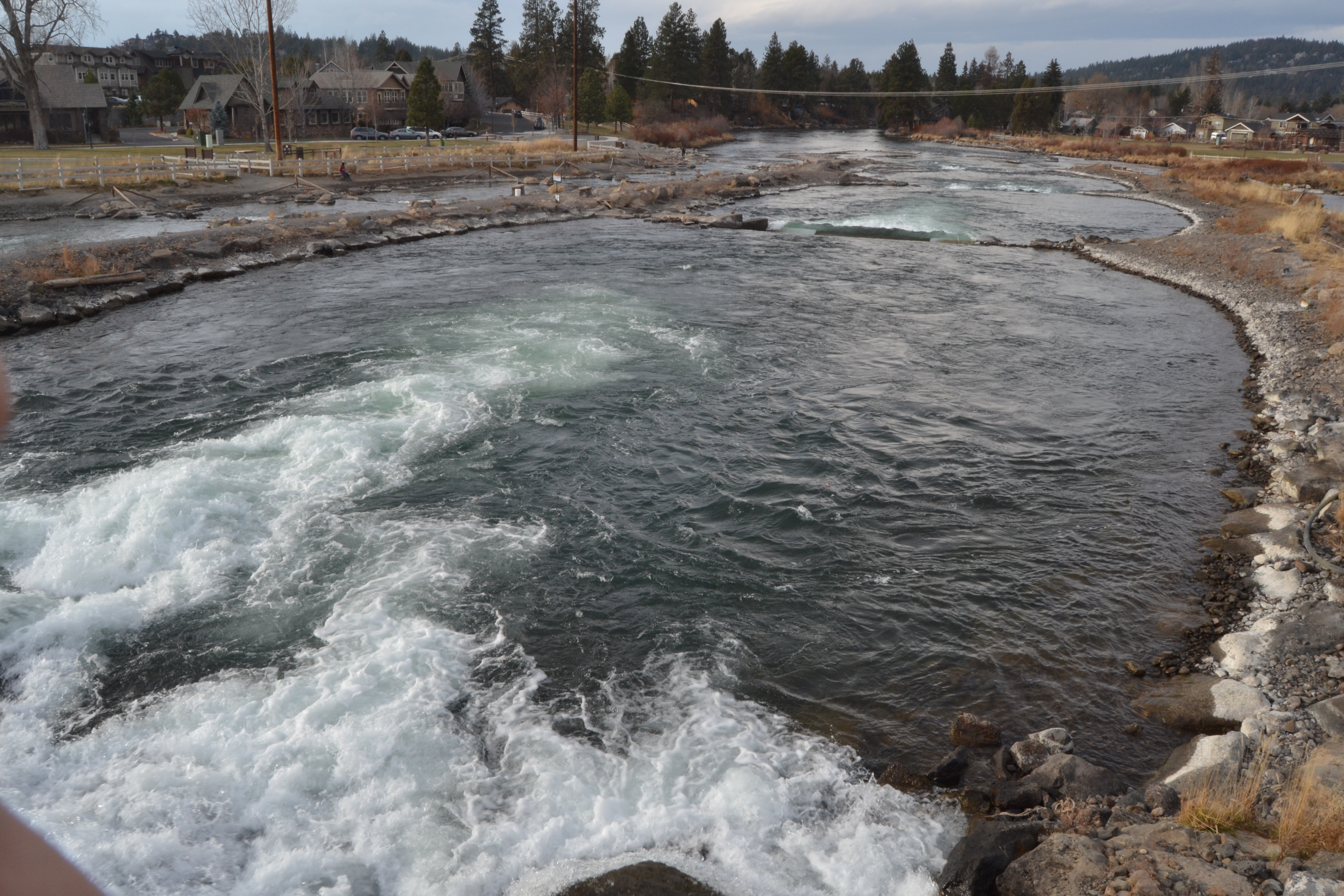
View from the top of the whitewater channel, which is for experts only.

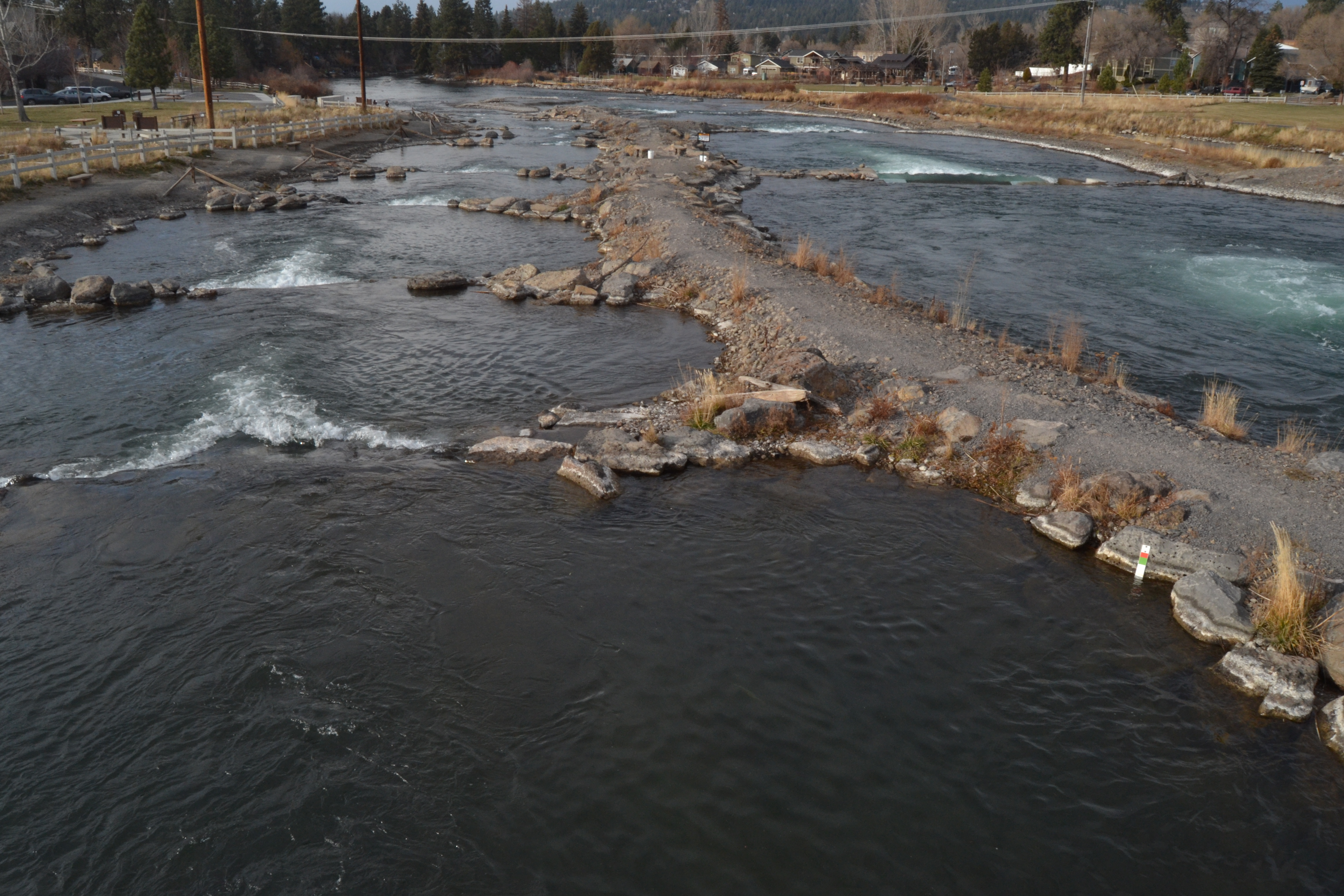
View from the top of the passageway channel, which is ideal for tubing.

The park was conceived by the Bend Park & Recreation District and the Bend Paddle Trail Alliance (BPTA) in 2007, and cost $9,681,985, including $1.13 million in community fundraising by the Bend Paddle Trail Alliance. It opened in September 2015. The park allows kayaking, surfing, tubing, whitewater paddleboarding, and bodyboarding. More than 230,000 people visited the park in 2017.

The park is located on the middle Deschutes River. It spans a 200-yard stretch of the river, and intersects with Colorado Avenue, at 166 SW Shevlin Hixon Dr., Bend, OR 97702. It features three distinct channels. On river left is the "passageway" channel, which consists of several small rapids that are appropriate for tubing. The middle channel is the "whitewater" channel, and is labeled "experts only". It is appropriate for whitewater kayakers, surfers, bodyboarders, and experienced paddleboarders. The third channel, on river right, is the "habitat" channel, and is strictly off limits to the public. Its purpose is to "protect and enhance river health and provide habitat to important local and migratory wildlife." A prime example of a wildlife species benefiting from this channel is the Oregon spotted frog, which is listed as threatened under the Endangered Species Act.

On April 30, 2022, they closed the river wave indefinitely due to a fatal incident.
