= Morne Dubois least gecko =

Conservation status
- Critically Endangered (IUCN 3.1)

Scientific classification
- Kingdom: Animalia
- Phylum: Chordata
- Class: Reptilia
- Order: Squamata
- Suborder: Gekkota
- Family: Sphaerodactylidae
- Genus: Sphaerodactylus
- Species: S. nycteropus

Binomial name
- Sphaerodactylus nycteropus Thomas & Schwartz, 1977

Species of lizard

The Morne Dubois least gecko (Sphaerodactylus nycteropus) is a species of lizard in the family Sphaerodactylidae. The species is endemic to Haiti.

== Geographic range ==
S. nycteropus is found on the Morne Dubois Peninsula, Département du Sud, Haiti.

== Reproduction ==
S. nycteropus is oviparous.
