= Anolis rimarum =

Conservation status
- Critically Endangered (IUCN 3.1)

Scientific classification
- Kingdom: Animalia
- Phylum: Chordata
- Class: Reptilia
- Order: Squamata
- Suborder: Iguania
- Family: Dactyloidae
- Genus: Anolis
- Species: A. rimarum

Binomial name
- Anolis rimarum Thomas & Schwartz, 1967

Species of lizard

Anolis rimarum, the Artibonite bush anole or marmelade anole, is a species of lizard in the family Dactyloidae. The species is found in Haiti.
