= Jaybird Cave =

Cave in Tennessee, United States

- Location within Tennessee
- Location: Perry County, Tennessee, US
- Coordinates: 35°46′N 87°45′W
- Length: 2.6 miles (4.2 km)
- Entrances: 1

Jaybird Cave is a cave located in Perry County, Tennessee. The cave is located in a hollow near the Buffalo River northeast of Lobelville. The cave reportedly served as shelter for Henri DeLobel, the founder of Lobelville. There is archeological evidence of saltpeter mining in the cave. It is a roosting location for the endangered little brown bat. In 2013, white nose syndrome was detected in the cave.
