= Typhlops capitulatus =

Conservation status
- Endangered (IUCN 3.1)

Scientific classification
- Kingdom: Animalia
- Phylum: Chordata
- Class: Reptilia
- Order: Squamata
- Suborder: Serpentes
- Family: Typhlopidae
- Genus: Typhlops
- Species: T. capitulatus

Binomial name
- Typhlops capitulatus Richmond, 1964

Species of snake

Typhlops capitulatus, the Haitian pale-lipped blind snake or Richmond's worm snake, is a species of snake belonging to the family Typhlopidae, the long-tailed blind snakes. This snake is endemic to Haiti.

== Taxonomy ==
Typhlops capitulatus was first formally described in 1964 by the American herpetologist Neil D. Richmond with its type locality given as the northwest end of Étang Saumâtre at Manneville, Haiti. This species is in the genus Typhlops which is classified within the long-tailed blind snake family Typhlopidae.

== Etymology ==
Typhlops capitulatus belongs to the genus Typhlops, a name which means "blind eyes. The specific name, capitulatus, means "having a small head".

== Geographic range ==
Typhlops capitulatusis endemic to Haiti on Hispaniola, where it is known from the Tiburon Peninsula. Its range extends from the Plain of the Cul-de-Sac along the Tiburon Peninsula to Miragoane, as well as along the south coast to the east and southwest of Jacmel.

== Habitat ==
Typhlops capitulatus is found in areas with an open canopy in woods, shaded ravines and on boulder strewnhills, at altitudes of 19–881 m (62–2,890 ft). It prefers xerophilic and mesophilic habitats it is fossorial and is often found under limestone rocks, large decaying logs and in moist leaf litter.

== Description ==
Typhlops capitulatus is small-headed and slender-bodied. Dorsally, it is light brown. Ventrally, it is paler, with scattered white scales. The anal region and the ventral surface of the tail are white. The total length (including tail) of the holotype is 20.5 cm (8.1 in), and the diameter at midbody is 4 mm (0.16 in).

== Reproduction ==
Typhlops capitulatus is oviparous.
