= Marche Leon least gecko =

Conservation status
- Critically Endangered (IUCN 3.1)

Scientific classification
- Kingdom: Animalia
- Phylum: Chordata
- Class: Reptilia
- Order: Squamata
- Suborder: Gekkota
- Family: Sphaerodactylidae
- Genus: Sphaerodactylus
- Species: S. elasmorhynchus

Binomial name
- Sphaerodactylus elasmorhynchus Thomas, 1966

Species of lizard

The Marche Leon least gecko (Sphaerodactylus elasmorhynchus), also known commonly as the snout-shield sphaero, is a species of lizard in the family Sphaerodactylidae. The species is endemic to Haiti.

== Geographic range ==
S. elasmorhynchus is known only from the type locality: "ca. 5 km (airline) SSE Marché Léon ... Haiti".

== Reproduction ==
S. elasmorhynchus is oviparous.
