= Endangered Species Act of 1969 =

United States law

The Endangered Species Conservation Act of 1969 (Public Law 91-135) was an expansion of the Endangered Species Preservation Act of 1966 which authorized the United States Secretary of the Interior to develop a comprehensive list of endangered species or subspecies of animals that were threatened with worldwide extinction. It also prohibited the importation from any foreign country of any animal, whole or in part, any product, or any egg belonging to a species on that list. Limited exceptions for scientific, educational, zoological, or propagational purposes, and for certain cases of commercial "economic hardship", were allowed under strict permitting procedures.

== History ==
=== Lacey Act of 1900 ===
A predecessor to the Endangered Species Act of 1969, the Lacey Act of 1900, was the first in a long line of efforts by the United States government to preserve wildlife. Introduced by Iowa Congressman John F. Lacey in the House of Representatives in 1900, and signed into law by President William McKinley on May 25, 1900, it was originally "directed more at the preservation of game and wild birds by making it a federal crime to poach game in one state with the purpose of selling the bounty in another".

=== Endangered Species Preservation Act of 1966 ===
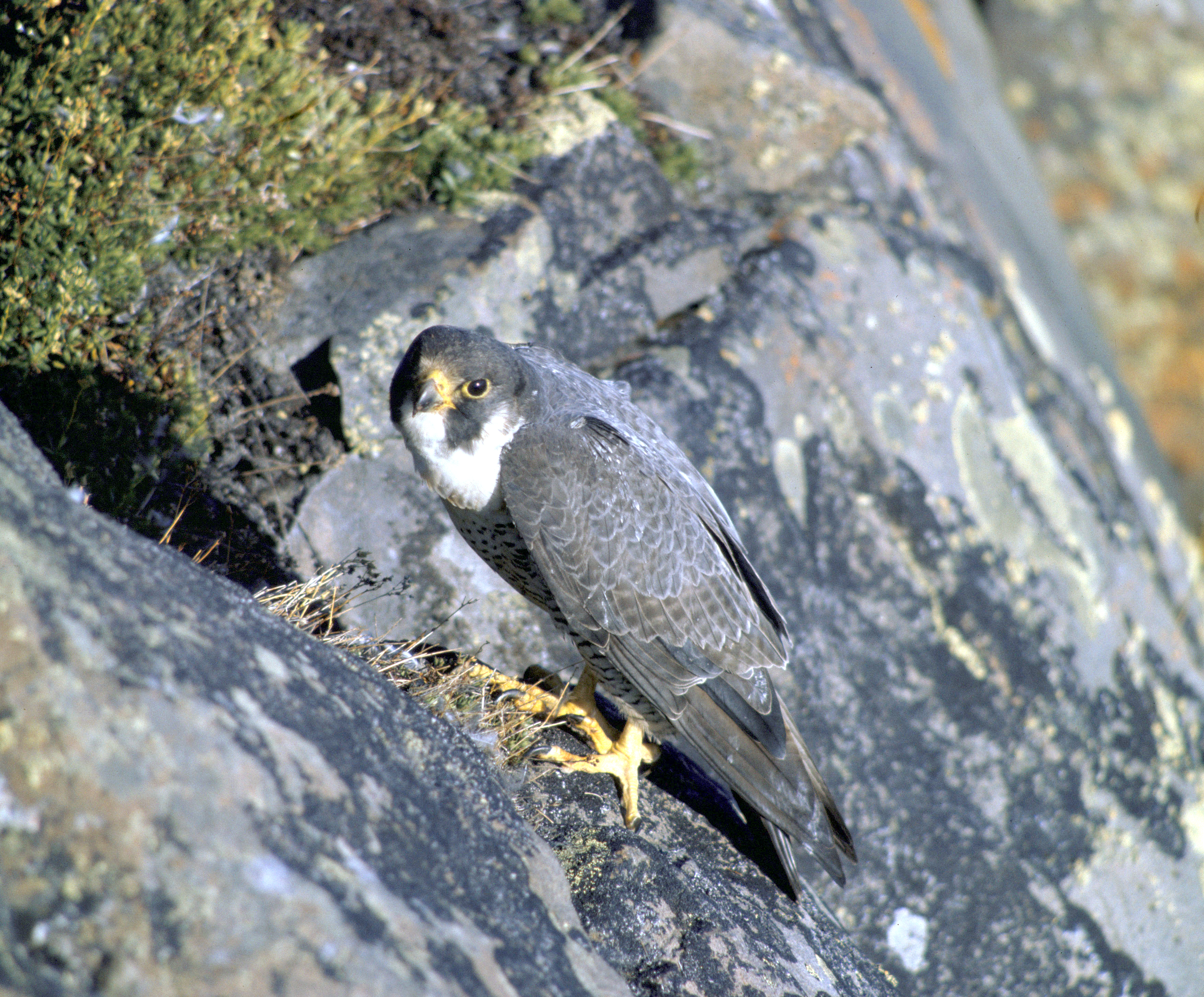
Peregrine falcon on rock

The Endangered Species Preservation Act of 1966 (Public Law 89-669) was passed prior to the 1969 act, and set up a list of species native to the United States that qualified as endangered. The animals on this list were then afforded certain protections from the National Wildlife Refuge System. For example, the Endangered Species Preservation Act was in part dedicated to raising awareness of endangered species of birds like the peregrine falcon, and to "conserve, protect, restore, and propagate certain species of native fish and wildlife".

Despite these protections, researchers found that the act was insufficient. This led to the passage of the Endangered Species Conservation Act of 1969.

== Provisions of the Endangered Species Act of 1969 ==
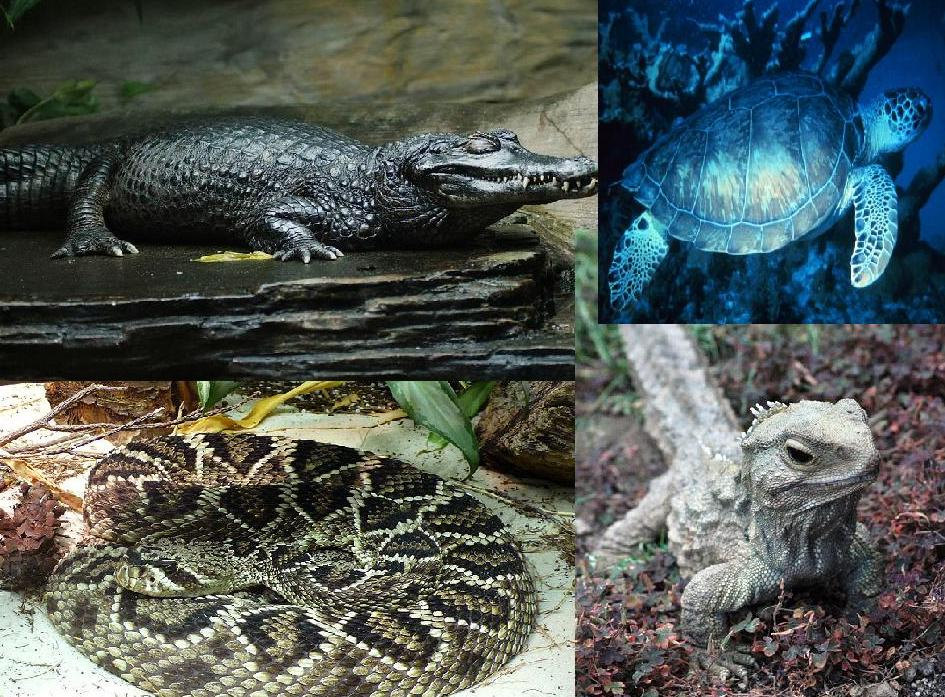
Multiple images of reptiles

The Endangered Species Preservation Act of 1969 was largely an expansion of the Lacey Act of 1900. In 1969, it was amended to protect species beyond game and wild birds. It granted protection to amphibians, reptiles, mollusks, and crustaceans, groups previously unprotected by any U.S. law. It also expanded the maximum punishment for poaching to a possible $10,000 and up to a year of jail time.

In addition, it established two lists into which endangered species could be sorted, foreign and domestic. The act then allowed for species on the domestic list to be given extra protection by United States agencies such as the U.S. Fish and Wildlife Service. It also stated that species on the foreign endangered list could not be brought into the United States.

The 1969 act further amended other existing laws to prohibit throughout the United States the sale or purchase by any person of any domestically endangered species or part or product thereof that was taken in any manner in violation of the laws or regulations of a state or foreign country. It also established the framework for the Convention on International Trade in Endangered Species of Wild Fauna and Flora, or CITIES which, "accords varying degrees of protection to more than 30,000 species of animals and plants, whether they are traded as live specimens, fur coats or dried herbs." Finally, the 1969 Act authorized up to $15 million to be appropriated to acquire land for the purpose of conserving, protecting, restoring, or propagating any endangered species.

== Endangered Species Act of 1973 ==
The Endangered Species Act of 1969 was only in effect for four years. It was soon replaced by the Endangered Species Act of 1973. The 1973 act was signed into law by President Richard Nixon, and expanded the protections afforded by the Endangered Species Act of 1969. The act is administered by two federal agencies, the United States Fish and Wildlife Service(FWS) and the National Oceanic and Atmospheric Administration (NOAA).

== See also ==
- Environment of the United States
- Conservation in the United States
- List of endangered species in North America
- List of extinct animals
