= Richard's worm snake =

Conservation status
- Near Threatened (IUCN 3.1)

Scientific classification
- Kingdom: Animalia
- Phylum: Chordata
- Class: Reptilia
- Order: Squamata
- Suborder: Serpentes
- Family: Typhlopidae
- Genus: Antillotyphlops
- Species: A. richardi

Binomial name
- Antillotyphlops richardi (A.M.C. Duméril & Bibron, 1844)

Synonyms
- Typhlops richardii A.M.C. Duméril & Bibron, 1844; Typhlops richardii — McDiarmid, Campbell & Touré, 1999; Antillotyphlops richardi — Hedges et al., 2014

Species of snake

Richard's worm snake (Antillotyphlops richardi) is a species of snake in the family Typhlopidae.

== Etymology ==
The specific name, richardi, is in honor of either of two French Botanists, Louis Claude Marie Richard or his son Achille Richard.

== Geographic range ==
It is endemic to the Caribbean, where it is found on Anegada in the British Virgin Islands, on the Turks and Caicos Islands, and on the United States Virgin Islands.
