= Schwartz's worm snake =

Conservation status
- Near Threatened (IUCN 3.1)

Scientific classification
- Kingdom: Animalia
- Phylum: Chordata
- Class: Reptilia
- Order: Squamata
- Suborder: Serpentes
- Family: Typhlopidae
- Genus: Typhlops
- Species: T. schwartzi

Binomial name
- Typhlops schwartzi Thomas, 1989

Species of snake

Schwartz's worm snake (Typhlops schwartzi) is a species of snake in the family Typhlopidae. The species is endemic to the Dominican Republic.

== Etymology ==
The specific name, schwartzi, is in honor of American herpetologist Albert Schwartz.
