= Dominican blind snake =

Conservation status
- Least Concern (IUCN 3.1)

Scientific classification
- Kingdom: Animalia
- Phylum: Chordata
- Class: Reptilia
- Order: Squamata
- Suborder: Serpentes
- Family: Typhlopidae
- Genus: Antillotyphlops
- Species: A. dominicanus

Binomial name
- Antillotyphlops dominicanus (Stejneger, 1904)

Synonyms
- Typhlops cinereus Typhlops dominicana Typhlops dominicanus

Species of reptile from the Lesser Antilles

The Dominican blind snake or Dominican worm snake (Antillotyphlops dominicanus) is a species of blind snake that is endemic to the Caribbean island-nation of Dominica, in the Lesser Antilles.

It is widespread, mainly in coastal xeric woodland and associated cultivated lands, but it is uncommonly seen because of its burrowing habits. It can reach 385 mm long. It has a small, rounded head, and colored brown all over, with a lighter ventral surface.

The Guadeloupe blind snake (A. guadeloupensis), endemic to Guadeloupe, is sometimes described as a subspecies, A. d. guadeloupensis, with the Dominican population then classified as the nominate subspecies, A. d. dominicanus.
