= Fond Parisien least gecko =

Conservation status
- Endangered (IUCN 3.1)

Scientific classification
- Domain: Eukaryota
- Kingdom: Animalia
- Phylum: Chordata
- Class: Reptilia
- Order: Squamata
- Infraorder: Gekkota
- Family: Sphaerodactylidae
- Genus: Sphaerodactylus
- Species: S. omoglaux

Binomial name
- Sphaerodactylus omoglaux Thomas, 1982

Species of lizard

The Fond Parisien least gecko (Sphaerodactylus omoglaux) is a species of lizard in the family Sphaerodactylidae. It is endemic to Haiti.
