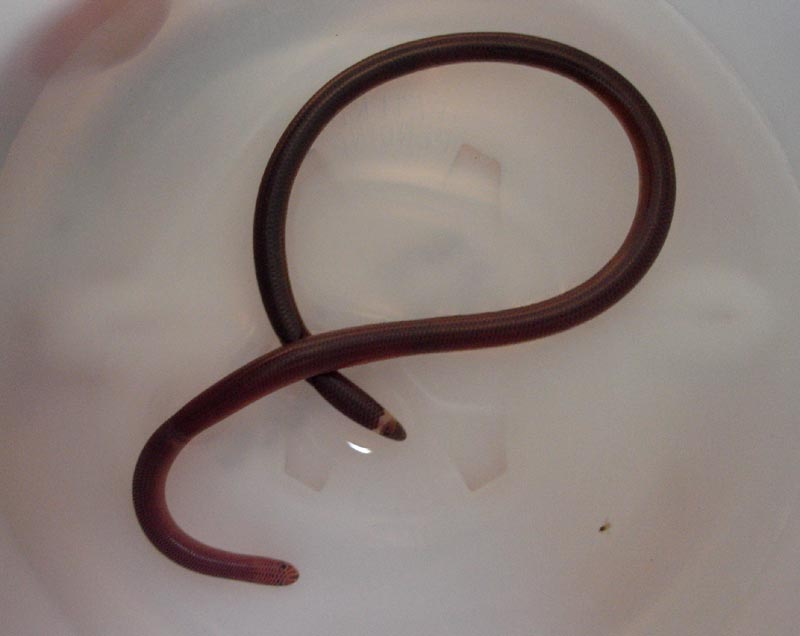

Scientific classification
- Domain: Eukaryota
- Kingdom: Animalia
- Phylum: Chordata
- Class: Reptilia
- Order: Squamata
- Suborder: Serpentes
- Family: Typhlopidae
- Genus: Antillotyphlops
- Species: A. platycephalus

Binomial name
- Antillotyphlops platycephalus (Duméril & Bibron, 1844)

Synonyms
- Typhlops platycephalus; Typhlops richardi platycephalus

= Flathead worm snake =

Species of reptile

The flathead worm snake (Antillotyphlops platycephalus) is a species of snake in the Typhlopidae family.
