= Hispaniola worm snake =

Conservation status
- Least Concern (IUCN 3.1)

Scientific classification
- Kingdom: Animalia
- Phylum: Chordata
- Class: Reptilia
- Order: Squamata
- Suborder: Serpentes
- Family: Typhlopidae
- Genus: Typhlops
- Species: T. pusillus

Binomial name
- Typhlops pusillus Barbour, 1914

Synonyms
- Typhlops pusilla

Species of snake

The Hispaniola worm snake (Typhlops pusillus) is a species of snake in the Typhlopidae family.
