= Cayemite short-tailed amphisbaena =

Conservation status
- Critically Endangered (IUCN 3.1)

Scientific classification
- Kingdom: Animalia
- Phylum: Chordata
- Class: Reptilia
- Order: Squamata
- Clade: Amphisbaenia
- Family: Amphisbaenidae
- Genus: Amphisbaena
- Species: A. cayemite

Binomial name
- Amphisbaena cayemite Thomas & Hedges, 2006

Species of lizard

The Cayemite short-tailed amphisbaena (Amphisbaena cayemite) is a worm lizard species in the family Amphisbaenidae. It is endemic to Haiti.
