= Typhlops jamaicensis =

Conservation status
- Least Concern (IUCN 3.1)

Scientific classification
- Kingdom: Animalia
- Phylum: Chordata
- Class: Reptilia
- Order: Squamata
- Suborder: Serpentes
- Family: Typhlopidae
- Genus: Typhlops
- Species: T. jamaicensis

Binomial name
- Typhlops jamaicensis (Shaw, 1802)

Synonyms
- Anguis Jamaicensis; Meditoria nasuta; Anilios leachii

Species of snake

Typhlops jamaicensis, also known as the Jamaican blind snake or Jamaica worm snake, is a species of snake in the Typhlopidae family.
