= Anolis placidus =

Conservation status
- Endangered (IUCN 3.1)

Scientific classification
- Kingdom: Animalia
- Phylum: Chordata
- Class: Reptilia
- Order: Squamata
- Suborder: Iguania
- Family: Dactyloidae
- Genus: Anolis
- Species: A. placidus

Binomial name
- Anolis placidus Hedges & Thomas, 1989

Species of lizard

Anolis placidus, also known as the Neiba twig anole or placid anole, is a species of lizard in the family Dactyloidae. The species is found in the Dominican Republic.
