= Sphaerodactylus williamsi =

Conservation status
- Critically Endangered (IUCN 3.1)

Scientific classification
- Kingdom: Animalia
- Phylum: Chordata
- Class: Reptilia
- Order: Squamata
- Suborder: Gekkota
- Family: Sphaerodactylidae
- Genus: Sphaerodactylus
- Species: S. williamsi

Binomial name
- Sphaerodactylus williamsi Thomas & Schwartz, 1983

Species of lizard

Sphaerodactylus williamsi, also known commonly as Williams's least gecko or the Haitian striped geckolet, is a small species of lizard in the family Sphaerodactylidae. The species is endemic to Haiti.

== Etymology ==
The specific name, williamsi, is in honor of American herpetologist Ernest Edward Williams.

== Habitat ==
The preferred habitat of S. williamsi is forest.

== Description ==
S. williamsi is a small species. The holotype has a snout-to-vent length (SVL) of 22 mm (0.87 in). It has small keeled dorsal scales.

== Reproduction ==
S. williamsi is oviparous.
