= Egg-mimic darter =

Conservation status
- Vulnerable (IUCN 3.1)

- Critically Imperiled (NatureServe)

Scientific classification
- Kingdom: Animalia
- Phylum: Chordata
- Class: Actinopterygii
- Order: Perciformes
- Family: Percidae
- Genus: Etheostoma
- Species: E. pseudovulatum

Binomial name
- Etheostoma pseudovulatum Page & Ceas, 1992

Species of fish

The egg-mimic darter (Etheostoma pseudovulatum) is a species of freshwater ray-finned fish, a darter from the subfamily Etheostomatinae, part of the family Percidae, which also contains the perches, ruffes and pikeperches. It is endemic to the eastern United States, where it is only known from the Duck River drainage of Tennessee. It inhabits creeks and headwaters, living in pools with very slow current. This species can reach a length of 6.1 cm (2.4 in). The fish's common name refers to round, fish egg-like yellow knobs projecting from the rays of the male's second dorsal fin, these "false eggs" attract females to spawn with the male.
