= Bakoruco least gecko =

Conservation status
- Endangered (IUCN 3.1)

Scientific classification
- Domain: Eukaryota
- Kingdom: Animalia
- Phylum: Chordata
- Class: Reptilia
- Order: Squamata
- Infraorder: Gekkota
- Family: Sphaerodactylidae
- Genus: Sphaerodactylus
- Species: S. cryphius

Binomial name
- Sphaerodactylus cryphius Thomas & Schwartz, 1977

Species of lizard

The Bakoruco least gecko (Sphaerodactylus cryphius) is a species of lizard in the family Sphaerodactylidae. It is endemic to the Dominican Republic.
