= Peravia least gecko =

Conservation status
- Endangered (IUCN 3.1)

Scientific classification
- Kingdom: Animalia
- Phylum: Chordata
- Class: Reptilia
- Order: Squamata
- Suborder: Gekkota
- Family: Sphaerodactylidae
- Genus: Sphaerodactylus
- Species: S. ocoae

Binomial name
- Sphaerodactylus ocoae Schwartz & Thomas, 1977

Species of lizard

The Peravia least gecko (Sphaerodactylus ocoae), also known commonly as the Ocoa geckolet, is a species of lizard in the family Sphaerodactylidae. The species is endemic to the Dominican Republic.

== Etymology ==
The specific name, ocoae, refers to the Sierra de Ocoa mountain range.

== Geographic distribution ==
Sphaerodactylus ocoae is found in Peravia Province, Dominican Republic.

== Habitat ==
The preferred habitat of Sphaerodactylus ocoae is forest.

== Reproduction ==
Sphaerodactylus ocoae is oviparous.
