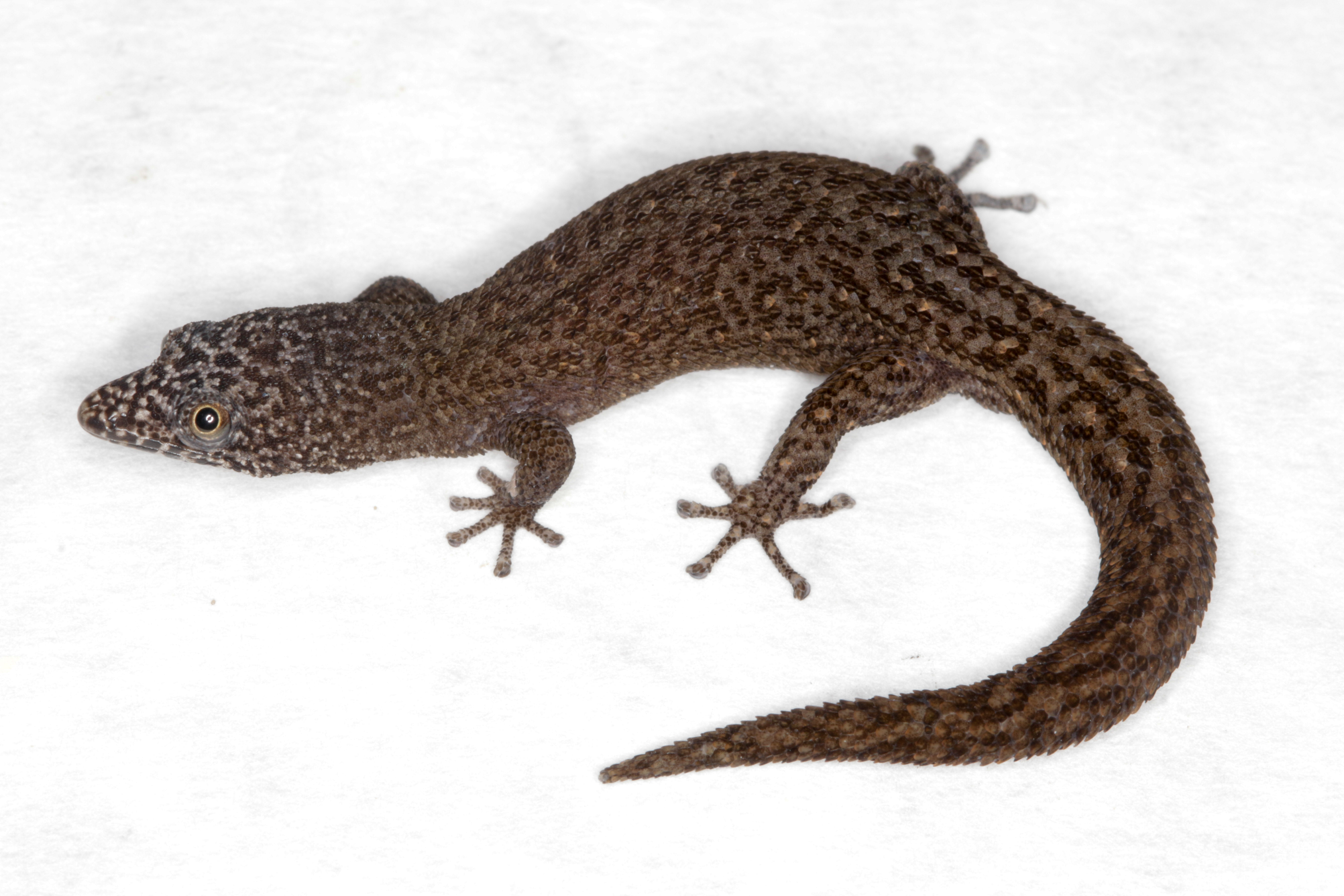

Conservation status
- Endangered (IUCN 3.1)

Scientific classification
- Kingdom: Animalia
- Phylum: Chordata
- Class: Reptilia
- Order: Squamata
- Suborder: Gekkota
- Family: Sphaerodactylidae
- Genus: Sphaerodactylus
- Species: S. randi

Binomial name
- Sphaerodactylus randi Shreve, 1968
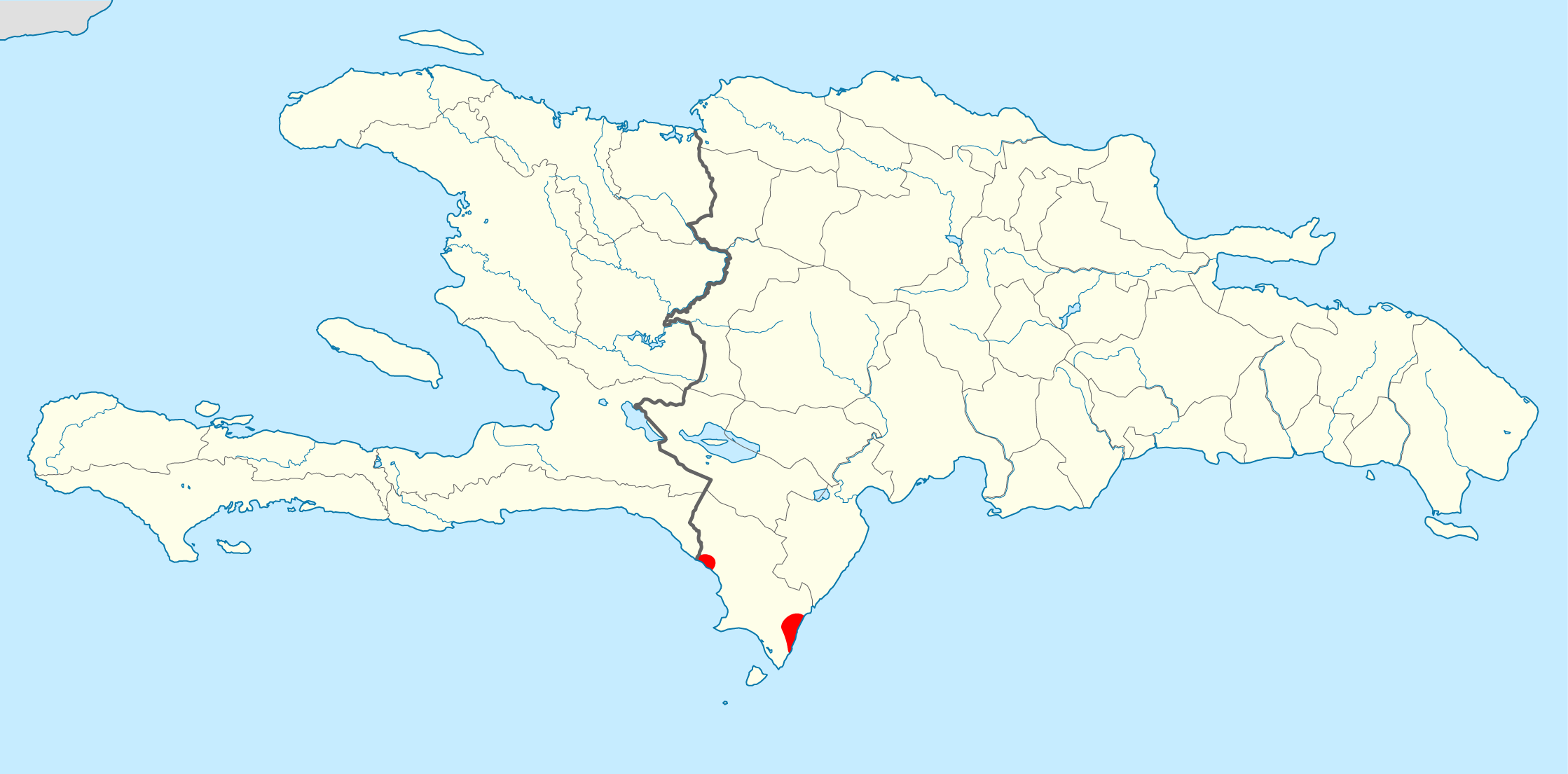
- Distribution of Sphaerodactylus randi. Known range in red.

Synonyms
- Sphaerodactylus notatus randi Shreve, 1968; Sphaerodactylus difficilis randi — Schwartz & Thomas, 1975; Sphaerodactylus randi — Schwartz, 1977

= Pedernales least gecko =

Species of lizard

The Pedernales least gecko (Sphaerodactylus randi) is a species of lizard in the family Sphaerodactylidae. The species is endemic to the Dominican Republic.

== Etymology ==
The specific name, randi, is in honor of American herpetologist Austin Stanley Rand (1932–2005).

The subspecific name, strahmi, is in honor of herpetologist Michael H. Strahm.

== Habitat ==
The preferred habitat of S. randi is forest at altitudes of 9–123 m (30–404 ft). This species inhabits dry forests and coastal scrubs, where it has been found beneath piles of organic debris like piles of coconut husks.

== Reproduction ==
S. randi is oviparous.

== Subspecies ==
Three subspecies are recognized as being valid, including the nominotypical subspecies.

- Sphaerodactylus randi methorius Schwartz, 1977
- Sphaerodactylus randi randi Shreve, 1968
- Sphaerodactylus randi strahmi Schwartz, 1977
