= Grant's worm snake =

Conservation status
- Endangered (IUCN 3.1)

Scientific classification
- Kingdom: Animalia
- Phylum: Chordata
- Class: Reptilia
- Order: Squamata
- Suborder: Serpentes
- Family: Typhlopidae
- Genus: Antillotyphlops
- Species: A. granti

Binomial name
- Antillotyphlops granti (Ruthven & Gaige, 1935)

Synonyms
- Typhlops granti Ruthven & Gaige, 1935; Antillotyphlops granti — Hedges et al., 2014; Typhlops granti — Pyron & Wallach, 2014

Species of snake

Grant's worm snake (Antillotyphlops granti), also known commonly as the Guanica blindsnake, is a species of snake in the family Typhlopidae. The species is endemic to Puerto Rico.

== Etymology ==
The specific name, granti, is in honor of American herpetologist Chapman Grant.

== Geographic range ==
A. granti is found in southwestern Puerto Rico, including Caja de Muertos, an island 8 miles (13 km) offshore from Ponce.

== Habitat ==
The preferred natural habitat of A. granti is forest, at altitudes from sea level to 100 m (330 ft).

== Description ==
A. granti may attain a total length (including a short tail) of 21 cm (8.3 in).

== Reproduction ==
A. granti is oviparous.
