= Faxonius alabamensis =

Conservation status
- Least Concern (IUCN 3.1)

- Secure (NatureServe)

Scientific classification
- Kingdom: Animalia
- Phylum: Arthropoda
- Class: Malacostraca
- Order: Decapoda
- Suborder: Pleocyemata
- Family: Cambaridae
- Genus: Faxonius
- Species: F. alabamensis

Binomial name
- Faxonius alabamensis (Faxon, 1884)

Synonyms
- Cambarus alabamensis Faxon, 1884; Orconectes alabamensis (Faxon, 1884)

Species of crayfish

Faxonius alabamensis, the Alabama crayfish, is a species of freshwater crayfish that lives in Alabama, Mississippi and Tennessee.

== Description ==
The largest individuals of Faxonius alabamensis reach a carapace length of 35 millimeters (1.4 in), while the smallest adults have a carapace length of only 14.6 mm (0.57 in).

== Distribution ==
Faxonius alabamensis is endemic to the Tennessee River drainage basin, with a range extending from Shoal Creek (Lawrence County and Hardin County, Tennessee) to Lauderdale County, Alabama.

== Status ==
Faxonius alabamensis is listed as a species of Least Concern on the IUCN Red List. Under the NatureServe system used by The Nature Conservancy, F. alabamensis is classified as G5: "secure".
