= Island worm snake =

Conservation status
- Near Threatened (IUCN 3.1)

Scientific classification
- Kingdom: Animalia
- Phylum: Chordata
- Class: Reptilia
- Order: Squamata
- Suborder: Serpentes
- Family: Typhlopidae
- Genus: Typhlops
- Species: T. sulcatus

Binomial name
- Typhlops sulcatus Cope, 1868

Synonyms
- Typhlops haitiensis Richmond, 1964; Typhlops sulcata [sic] - Schwartz & Thomas, 1975

Species of snake

The island worm snake (Typhlops sulcatus) is a species of snake in the Typhlopidae family.

== Geographic range ==
It is endemic to southwestern Hispaniola (Dominican Republic and Haiti), formerly including Navassa Island, an uninhabited island located in the Caribbean.

== Conservation status ==
It has been rated Near Threatened. It is extirpated from Navassa Island, where the species became a casualty of human interference and feral predators, such as rodents, cats, dogs and goats that were introduced during the large-scale mining period on this small island during the 1800s.
