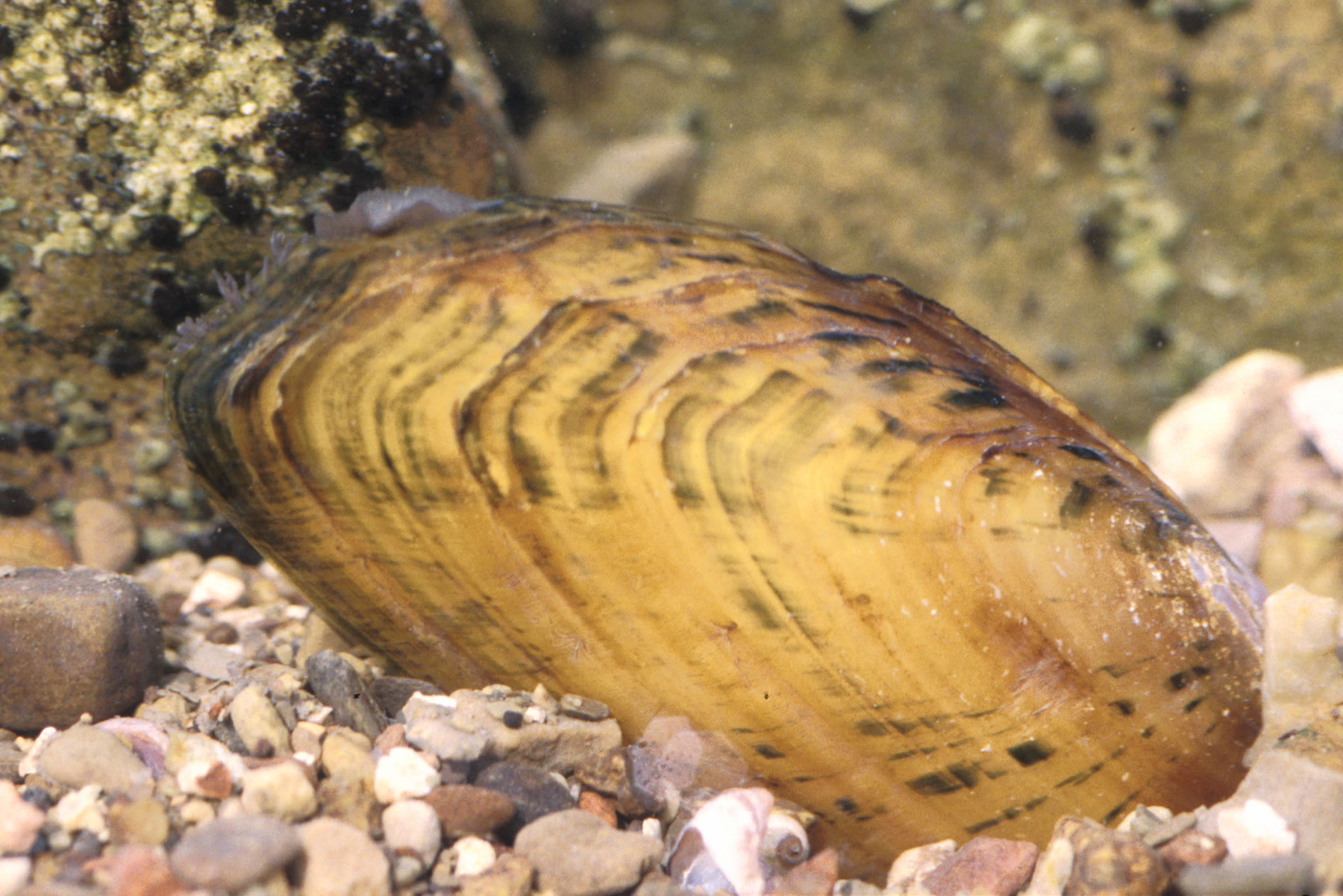

Conservation status
- Critically Endangered (IUCN 2.3)

- Endangered (ESA)

Scientific classification
- Kingdom: Animalia
- Phylum: Mollusca
- Class: Bivalvia
- Order: Unionida
- Family: Unionidae
- Tribe: Pleurobemini
- Genus: Hemistena; Rafinesque, 1820
- Species: H. lata

Binomial name
- Hemistena lata (Rafinesque, 1820)

Synonyms
- Lastena lata (Rafinesque, 1820); Anodonta lata Rafinesque, 1820; Unio dehiscens Say, 1829; Unio oriens Lea, 1831; Odatelia radiata Rafinesque, 1832; Unio hildrethi Delessert, 1841; Unio dehiscens subsp. oriensopsis de Gregorio, 1914

= Cracking pearlymussel =

Species of bivalve

The cracking pearlymussel (Hemistena lata) is an endangered species of freshwater mussel, an aquatic bivalve mollusk in the family Unionidae.

This species is native to the United States, where it remains only in Tennessee and Virginia. It was originally distributed in the Ohio River, Cumberland River and Tennessee River systems, but it has been extirpated from most of its previous range.

Parmalee and Bogan reported that there were still populations in the Clinch River in Tennessee. Other populations that are known to survive are located in the Powell and Elk Rivers.

== Shell description ==
These mussels have thin, fairly weak, elongated shells. The shells may reach up to 69 millimetres (2.7 in) in height The outer coloring of the shell varies from yellow to brown, while the interior of the shell is pale bluish white, with a purple beak cavity.

== Ecology ==
This species spends its adult life buried under the sand or mud at the bottom of medium-sized, flowing rivers. The females capture sperm released into the water by males. They store the sperm until they need them to fertilize their eggs. After fertilization, the females release the larvae into the river, where the larvae attach themselves to fish. Once the larva matures into juveniles with shells, they leave their host fish and drop into the sediment, where they bury themselves. This process, therefore, requires an environment with ample fish to act as hosts. They prefer relatively shallow (usually less than 2 ft deep) water with a moderate current.

== Conservation ==
The main threats to the continued existence of this species are habitat changes due to damming of rivers, silting of rivers due to erosion caused by construction, farming and logging, and poisoning due to agricultural and industrial pollution. The U.S. Fish and Wildlife Service has created a recovery plan for this species. As of the most recent 5 year review, the cracking pearlymussel is still critically endangered and has not met the recovery goals.
