= Eleutherodactylus auriculatoides =

Conservation status
- Vulnerable (IUCN 3.1)

Scientific classification
- Kingdom: Animalia
- Phylum: Chordata
- Class: Amphibia
- Order: Anura
- Family: Eleutherodactylidae
- Genus: Eleutherodactylus
- Species: E. auriculatoides

Binomial name
- Eleutherodactylus auriculatoides Noble, 1923

Species of amphibian

Eleutherodactylus auriculatoides, the eared robber frog or northern hammer frog, is a species of frog in the family Eleutherodactylidae endemic to the Cordillera Central in the Dominican Republic. Its natural habitats are montane closed forest. It is an arboreal species often found in bromeliads. Habitat loss caused by agriculture and charcoal production is the main threat to it. Its presence is uncertain in Haiti.

== Taxonomy ==
Eleutherodactylus auriculatoides was formally described in 1923 based on a specimen collected from the Constanza-Jarabacoa Trail near Paso Bajito in the province of La Vega in Dominican Republic. It has the English common names eared robber frog and northern hammer frog. It has occasionally been considered a subspecies of E. auriculatus and E. montanus in the past. Gladwyn Kingsley Noble, while describing the species, noted that he considered it to be closely related to E. flavescens and E. auriculatus. Today, it is generally considered to be part of the Eleutherodactylus montanus species group in the subgenus Eleutherodactylus.

== Distribution and habitat ==
Eleutherodactylus auriculatoides is endemic to the Cordillera Central of the Dominican Republic, where it is found irregularly in closed-canopy forest. It is arboreal and lives inside bromeliads and palm bracts in the montane forests it inhabits. It is known from elevations of 788–1,890 m (2,585–6,201 ft) and has an estimated extent of occurrence of 6,546 km^{2}.

Females lay clutches of nine eggs in bromeliads, where they are protected by males. The species grows via direct development, with eggs hatching directly into juvenile frogs instead of tadpoles.

== Conservation ==
Eleutherodactylus auriculatoides is classified as being endangered by the IUCN due to its rather limited range, which is suffering from ongoing habitat degradation. Like other frogs from Hispaniola, it does not react well to degradation of its habitat. Forests in its range is currently threatened by ranching, agriculture, logging, and charcoal production. The species is also extremely vulnerable to climactic disturbances caused by climate change. It is known from several protected areas in the Dominican Republic.
