= Gonâve Island worm snake =

Conservation status
- Endangered (IUCN 3.1)

Scientific classification
- Kingdom: Animalia
- Phylum: Chordata
- Class: Reptilia
- Order: Squamata
- Suborder: Serpentes
- Family: Typhlopidae
- Genus: Typhlops
- Species: T. gonavensis

Binomial name
- Typhlops gonavensis Richmond, 1964

Synonyms
- Typhlops capitulatus gonavensis

Species of snake

The Gonâve Island worm snake (Typhlops gonavensis) is a species of snake in the Typhlopidae family.
