= Montserrat worm snake =

Conservation status
- Near Threatened (IUCN 3.1)

Scientific classification
- Kingdom: Animalia
- Phylum: Chordata
- Class: Reptilia
- Order: Squamata
- Suborder: Serpentes
- Family: Typhlopidae
- Genus: Antillotyphlops
- Species: A. monastus

Binomial name
- Antillotyphlops monastus (Thomas, 1966)

Synonyms
- Typhlops monastus

Species of snake

The Montserrat worm snake (Antillotyphlops monastus) is a species of blind snake that is endemic to the Caribbean Lesser Antilles.

It has a trunk length up to 258 mm, with a tail up to 44 mm long. Its dorsal surface is medium brown, with a lighter ventral surface. It is insectivorous and fossorial.

It is found on Montserrat.
