= Martin Garcia least gecko =

Conservation status
- Endangered (IUCN 3.1)

Scientific classification
- Kingdom: Animalia
- Phylum: Chordata
- Class: Reptilia
- Order: Squamata
- Suborder: Gekkota
- Family: Sphaerodactylidae
- Genus: Sphaerodactylus
- Species: S. ladae

Binomial name
- Sphaerodactylus ladae Thomas & Hedges, 1988

Species of lizard

The Martin Garcia least gecko (Sphaerodactylus ladae), also known commonly as the spotted agave geckolet, is a species of lizard in the family Sphaerodactylidae. The species is endemic to the Dominican Republic.

== Etymology ==
The specific name, ladae, is in honor of the Lada, the reliable Russian car.

== Geographic range ==
Sphaerodactylus ladae is found in the Sierra Martín García, Dominican Republic.

== Habitat ==
The preferred natural habitat of Sphaerodactylus ladae is forest, at altitudes of 15–235 m (49–771 ft).

== Reproduction ==
Sphaerodactylus ladae is oviparous.
