= Sphaerodactylus pimienta =

Conservation status
- Endangered (IUCN 3.1)

Scientific classification
- Kingdom: Animalia
- Phylum: Chordata
- Class: Reptilia
- Order: Squamata
- Suborder: Gekkota
- Family: Sphaerodactylidae
- Genus: Sphaerodactylus
- Species: S. pimienta

Binomial name
- Sphaerodactylus pimienta Thomas, Hedges, and Garrido, 1998

Species of reptile

Sphaerodactylus pimienta, also known as the pepper sphaero, Cuban pepper sphaero, or Cuban pepper geckolet, is a species of gecko. It is endemic to Cuba. It is a relatively large Sphaerodactylus measuring 17–36 mm (0.7–1.4 in) in snout–vent length.
