= Puerto Rican coastal blind snake =

Scientific classification
- Kingdom: Animalia
- Phylum: Chordata
- Class: Reptilia
- Order: Squamata
- Suborder: Serpentes
- Family: Typhlopidae
- Genus: Antillotyphlops
- Species: A. hypomethes

Binomial name
- Antillotyphlops hypomethes (Hedges & Thomas, 1991)

Synonyms
- Typhlops hypomethes

Species of reptile

The Puerto Rican coastal blind snake (Antillotyphlops hypomethes) is a species of snake in the Typhlopidae family.
