= Antillotyphlops catapontus =

Conservation status
- Data Deficient (IUCN 3.1)

Scientific classification
- Kingdom: Animalia
- Phylum: Chordata
- Class: Reptilia
- Order: Squamata
- Suborder: Serpentes
- Family: Typhlopidae
- Genus: Antillotyphlops
- Species: A. catapontus

Binomial name
- Antillotyphlops catapontus (Thomas, 1966)

Synonyms
- Typhlops richardi catapontus; Typhlops catapontus

Species of snake

Antillotyphlops catapontus is a species of snake in the Typhlopidae family.
