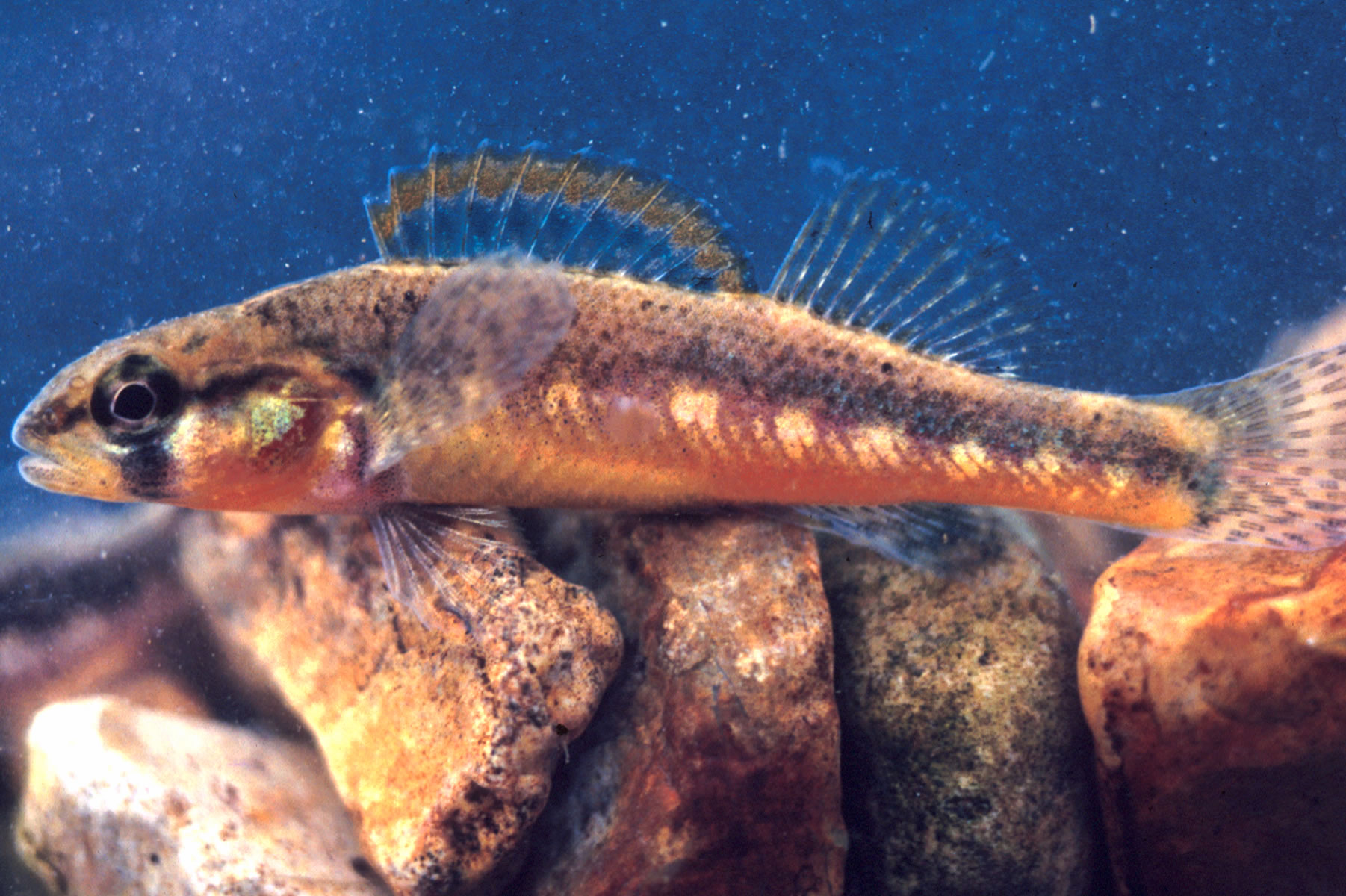

Conservation status
- Endangered (IUCN 3.1)

- Threatened (ESA)

Scientific classification
- Kingdom: Animalia
- Phylum: Chordata
- Class: Actinopterygii
- Order: Perciformes
- Family: Percidae
- Genus: Etheostoma
- Species: E. boschungi

Binomial name
- Etheostoma boschungi Wall & J. D. Williams, 1974

= Slackwater darter =

Species of fish

The slackwater darter (Etheostoma boschungi) is a small species of the freshwater ray-finned fish and a darter from the subfamily Etheostomatinae, part of the family Percidae, which also contains the perches, ruffes and pikeperches. Some authors consider it to be a member of the stippled darter group. The slackwater darter has a conspicuous dark subocular bar and three prominent saddles. It is rather drab in color, with the dorsum being dusky, olivaceous, or brownish. The lateral blotches are dark brown to blue-black. The venter is slightly dusky and may have some orange and yellow pigments, which are more intense in males than in females. Maximum size is about 55 millimetres (2.2 in) standard length.

== Reproduction ==
The reproductive behavior of the slackwater darter varies with the temperature of the breeding habitat and the amount of rainfall. Spawning has not been recorded in water less than 14 °C (57 °F). In addition, heavy rainfall must cause enough flooding to lift the darters into the breeding area. Usually, adult darters begin their migration to the breeding area in mid-January. They reach the breeding habitat in February and begin spawning in March. By April, the darter progeny is developing and ready to leave the breeding area in May. Young darters double in size between April and June. Evidence suggests the slackwater darter is a short-lived species with a lifespan of only three years.

== Range and population ==
The geographic range of the slackwater darter is five tributaries to the southern bend of the Tennessee River in northern Alabama and southwestern Tennessee. The species is known from one locality in the headwaters of the Buffalo River in Lawrence County, Tennessee, nineteen localities in the Cypress Creek drainage in Wayne County, Tennessee and Lauderdale County, Alabama, three localities in Swan Creek, Limestone County, Alabama, and three localities in the Flint River drainage in Madison County, Alabama. Moreover, one specimen was found in Shoal Creek, Lawrence County, Tennessee. Nothing is known of this darter's past distribution and abundance.

Periodic sampling in the headwaters of the Buffalo River in Lawrence County has indicated its population of slackwater darters is extremely small and limited. In this area, the species is confined to a short segment of a very small stream, and the number of individuals is apparently quite low. The population in the Flint River drainage in Madison County, Alabama, is similarly small and limited. The largest population and the stronghold of the species is in the Cypress Creek drainage system, Wayne County, Tennessee, and Lauderdale County, Alabama.

== Habitat ==
The slackwater darter uses two different, but adjacent, breeding and nonbreeding habitats. Its nonbreeding habitat is small to moderately large streams with moderate to slow currents. The species seems to prefer bottom conditions characterized by an accumulation of leaves and detritus, but in some areas, it has been found in association with clean silt, sand, and small gravel substrates. Breeding habitat is seepage water in open fields or woods. The water in the breeding area, about 4 to 8 centimetres (1.6 to 3.1 in) deep, flows slowly into an adjacent stream (the nonbreeding habitat). Since the breeding habitat is usually 30 to 45 centimetres (12 to 18 in) above the stream, the stream water must periodically rise (as it does during heavy rains) to give darters access to the breeding grounds.

== Threatened species ==
The restricted range of this species increases its vulnerability to the detrimental effects of human activity. Urbanization, ditching to drain areas with shallow groundwater, and degradation of ground and surface water from pesticides and waste are all serious threats. For example, the population in the Flint River drainage in Madison County, Alabama, is threatened by changing land use patterns associated with the growth of the city of Huntsville.

This species' existence is dependent upon adjacent and suitable breeding and nonbreeding habitats. If either of these habitats becomes unsuitable, darters will be extirpated from that location. A declining groundwater table has eliminated darter breeding sites in some areas. Slackwater darter breeding areas are also potential sites for farm fish ponds, which would inundate the habitat.

== Management and protection ==
The future well-being of the slackwater darter will depend on the wise use of land and the general adoption of policies that will assure preservation of essential habitat needs. This species' recovery plan, approved in 1984, provides the following guidelines for its recovery: (1) establishment and protection of one or more specific habitat areas in at least three different tributaries to the Tennessee River System, with spawning areas protected by purchase or cooperative agreement; (2) data to show that populations are stable or increasing; and, (3) water quality and ecological data to indicate that the environment is suitable and stable or improving.

The above goals will be achieved by researching and providing this fish's survival needs. Some strategies, listed in the recovery plan, include: three- to five-year censuses near and in selected breeding habitats to determine and monitor populations; analyses of water quality and other characteristics in breeding and nonbreeding habitats; and research on the darter's reproductive and life cycles. The U.S. Fish and Wildlife Service is also continuing to coordinate with the Soil Conservation Service to protect the slackwater darter's habitat in the Cypress Creek drainage, Tennessee.
