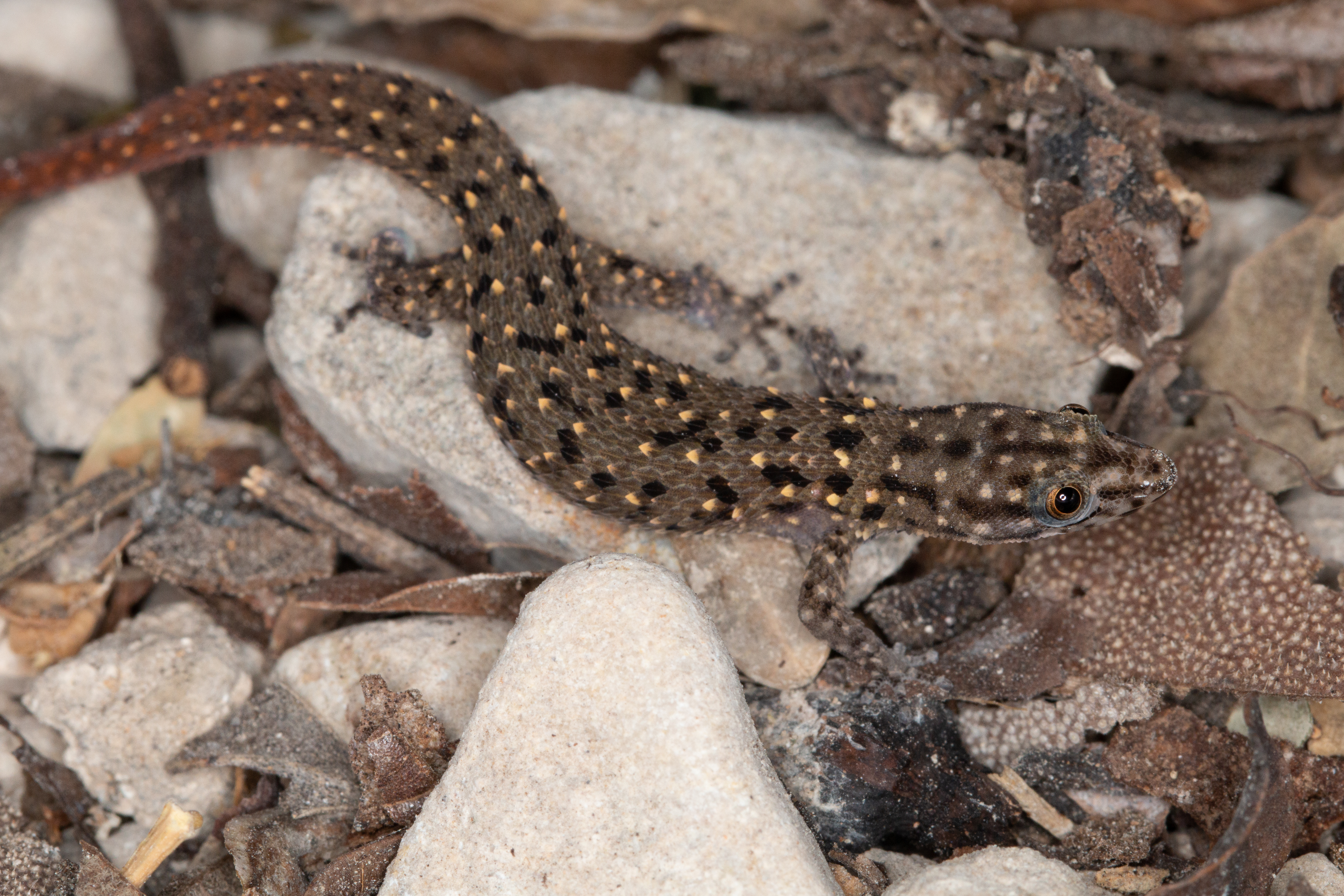

Conservation status
- Critically Endangered (IUCN 3.1)

Scientific classification
- Kingdom: Animalia
- Phylum: Chordata
- Class: Reptilia
- Order: Squamata
- Suborder: Gekkota
- Family: Sphaerodactylidae
- Genus: Sphaerodactylus
- Species: S. schuberti

Binomial name
- Sphaerodactylus schuberti Thomas & Hedges, 1998

= Neiba agave sphaero =

Species of lizard

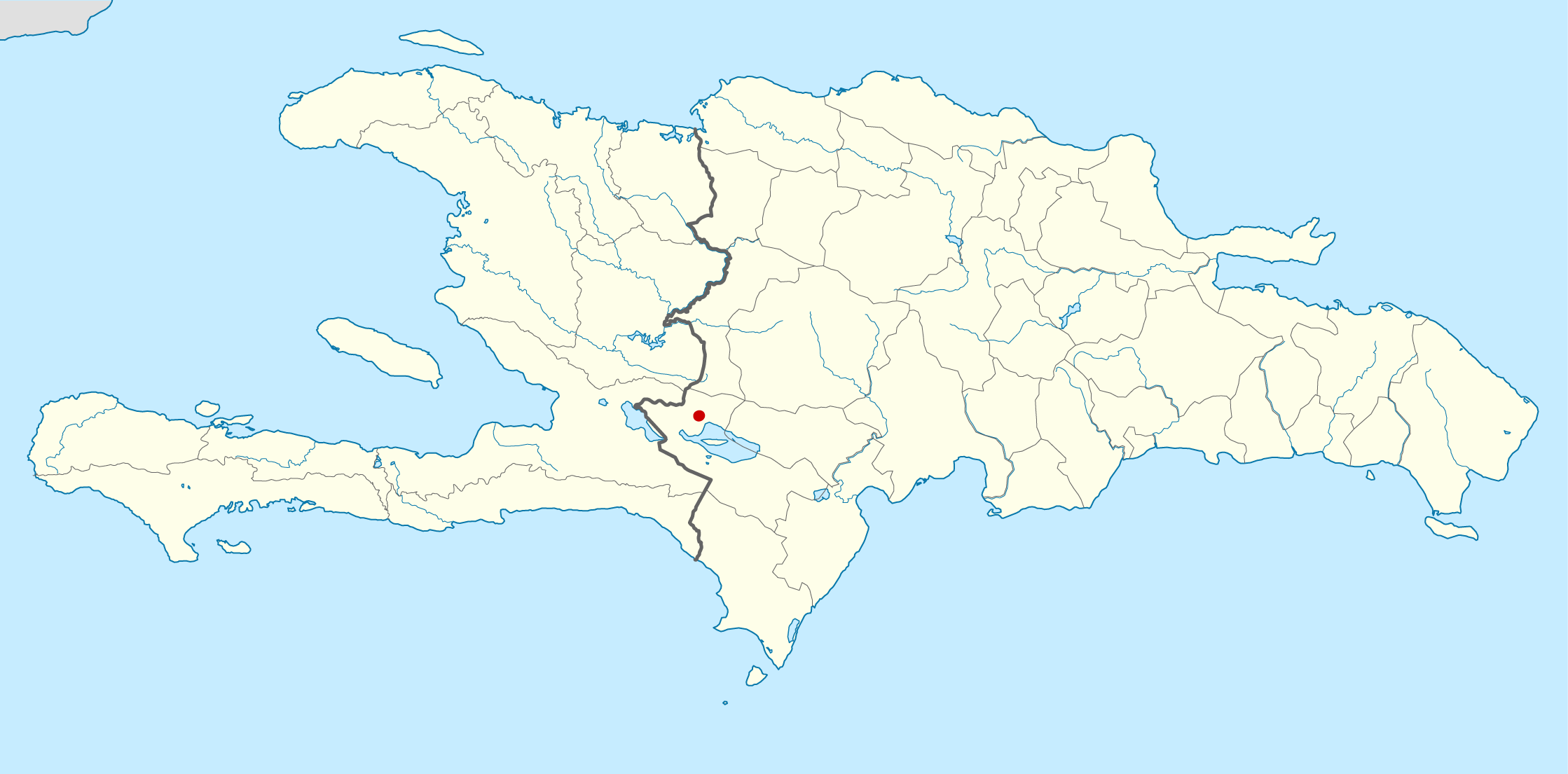
Distribution of Sphaerodactylus schuberti (known range; red).

The Neiba agave sphaero (Sphaerodactylus schuberti), also known commonly as the Neiba agave geckolet and Schubert's least gecko, is a species of lizard in the family Sphaerodactylidae. The species is endemic to the Dominican Republic.

== Etymology ==
The specific name, schuberti, is in honor of German zoologist Andreas Schubert.

== Habitat ==
The preferred habitat of S. schuberti is in dead agaves in xeric forest at an altitude of 273 m (896 ft).

== Reproduction ==
S. schuberti is oviparous.
