= Eleutherodactylus haitianus =

Conservation status
- Endangered (IUCN 3.1)

Scientific classification
- Kingdom: Animalia
- Phylum: Chordata
- Class: Amphibia
- Order: Anura
- Clade: Brachycephaloidea
- Family: Eleutherodactylidae
- Genus: Eleutherodactylus
- Species: E. haitianus

Binomial name
- Eleutherodactylus haitianus Barbour, 1942

Synonyms
- Eleutherodactylus intermedius Cochran, 1941

Species of frog

Eleutherodactylus haitianus is a species of frog in the family Eleutherodactylidae endemic to the Cordillera Central, Dominican Republic, at elevations of 1,545–2,455 m (5,069–8,054 ft) asl. Its natural habitat is high-elevation pine forest. It is locally common but patchily distributed. It is threatened by habitat loss caused by agriculture and by disturbance from ecotourism.

== See also ==
- Eleutherodactylus
- Eleutherodactylidae
- List of amphibians of the Dominican Republic
