= Guadeloupe blind snake =

Scientific classification
- Domain: Eukaryota
- Kingdom: Animalia
- Phylum: Chordata
- Class: Reptilia
- Order: Squamata
- Suborder: Serpentes
- Family: Typhlopidae
- Genus: Typhlops
- Species: T. guadeloupensis

Binomial name
- Typhlops guadeloupensis Richmond, 1966

Synonyms
- Typhlops dominicana guadeloupensis; Typhlops dominicanus guadeloupensis

Species of snake

The Guadeloupe blind snake or Guadeloupe worm snake (Typhlops guadeloupensis) is a species of blind snake that is endemic to Guadeloupe, located in the Caribbean Lesser Antilles. It is fairly widespread on the main islands of Basse-Terre and Grande-Terre, but is not recorded on the other Guadeloupean islands.

It is sometimes described as an endemic subspecies of Typhlops dominicanus, with a sister subspecies, T. d. dominicanus, present on Dominica.
