= Titan worm snake =

Conservation status
- Endangered (IUCN 3.1)

Scientific classification
- Kingdom: Animalia
- Phylum: Chordata
- Class: Reptilia
- Order: Squamata
- Suborder: Serpentes
- Family: Typhlopidae
- Genus: Typhlops
- Species: T. titanops

Binomial name
- Typhlops titanops Thomas, 1989

Species of snake

The titan worm snake (Typhlops titanops) is a species of snake in the Typhlopidae family.

== Distribution ==
This species is endemic to Hispaniola, where it occurs on the Massif de la Selle (Haiti) and Sierra de Bahoruco (Dominican Republic). It has an elevational range from about 240 to 730 m (790 to 2,400 ft).

== Conservation ==
This species is known from very few records. S.B. Hedges (pers. comm. 2017) has only found two individuals in 30 years of surveying, both taken in June 1985 at 274 m (899 ft) along the Rio Molito, on the Dominican side of the border. Extremely high rates of forest clearance at elevations where this snake occurs, and its likely reliance on deadwood, leaf litter or forest soils suggests that the population is likely to be severely fragmented.
