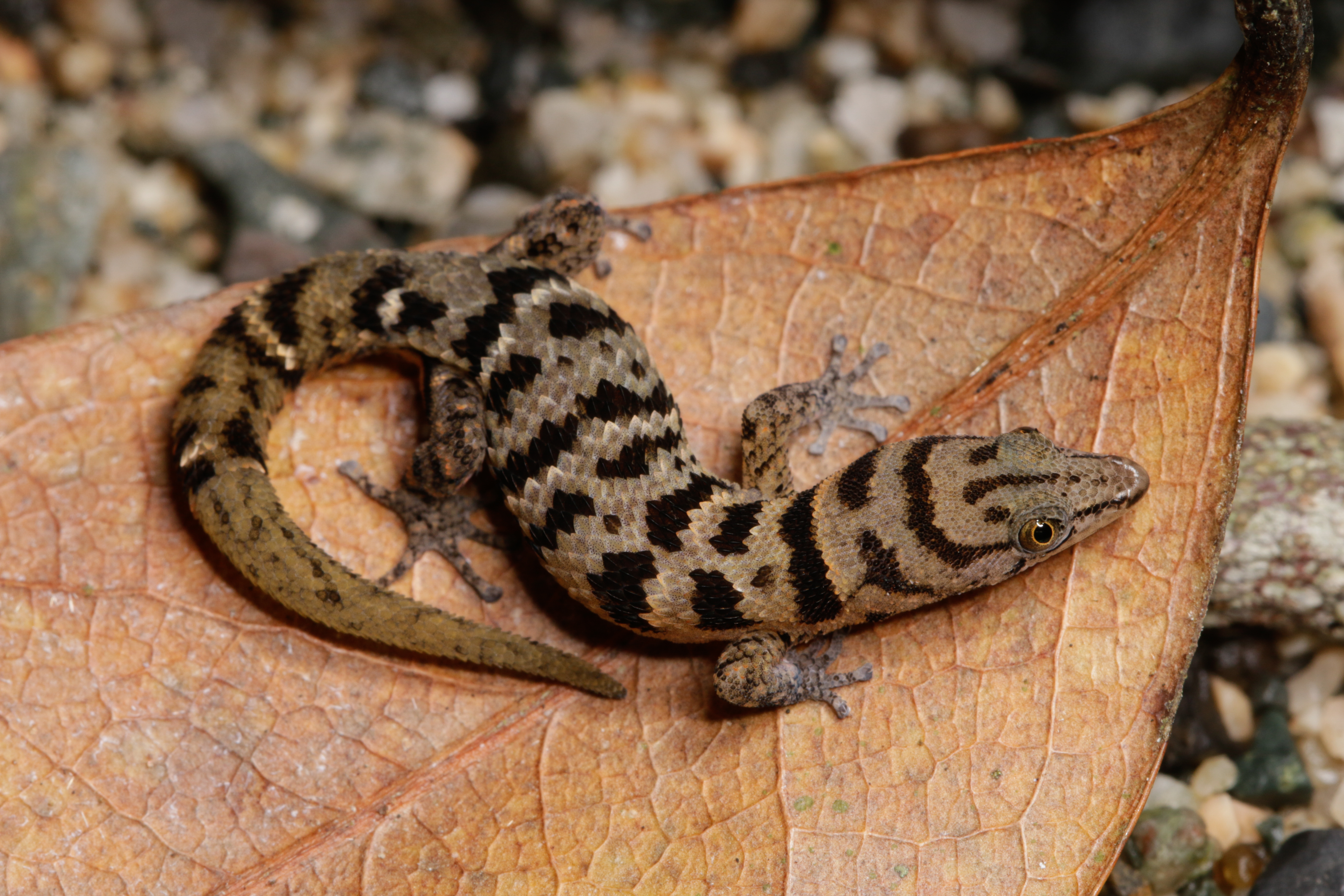

Conservation status
- Critically Endangered (IUCN 3.1)

Scientific classification
- Domain: Eukaryota
- Kingdom: Animalia
- Phylum: Chordata
- Class: Reptilia
- Order: Squamata
- Infraorder: Gekkota
- Family: Sphaerodactylidae
- Genus: Sphaerodactylus
- Species: S. epiurus

Binomial name
- Sphaerodactylus epiurus Thomas & Hedges, 1993

= Hispaniolan tailspot sphaero =

Species of lizard

The Hispaniolan tailspot sphaero (Sphaerodactylus epiurus) is a species of gecko in the family Sphaerodactylidae. It is endemic to the Dominican Republic.
