= Guantanamo collared sphaero =

Conservation status
- Endangered (IUCN 3.1)

Scientific classification
- Kingdom: Animalia
- Phylum: Chordata
- Class: Reptilia
- Order: Squamata
- Suborder: Gekkota
- Family: Sphaerodactylidae
- Genus: Sphaerodactylus
- Species: S. schwartzi

Binomial name
- Sphaerodactylus schwartzi Thomas, Hedges & Garrido, 1992

Species of lizard

The Guantanamo collared sphaero (Sphaerodactylus schwartzi), also known commonly as the Monitongas collared geckolet, and Schwartz's dwarf gecko, is a species of lizard in the family Sphaerodactylidae. The species is endemic to Cuba.

== Etymology ==
The specific name, schwartzi, honors American herpetologist Albert Schwartz.

== Habitat ==
The preferred habitat of S. schwartzi is forest at altitudes of 50–100 m (160–330 ft).

== Description ==
Adults of S. schwartzi have a snout-to-vent length (SVL) of only 18–20 mm (0.71–0.79 in).

== Reproduction ==
S. schwartzi is oviparous.
