= Typhlops syntherus =

Conservation status
- Endangered (IUCN 3.1)

Scientific classification
- Kingdom: Animalia
- Phylum: Chordata
- Class: Reptilia
- Order: Squamata
- Suborder: Serpentes
- Family: Typhlopidae
- Genus: Typhlops
- Species: T. syntherus

Binomial name
- Typhlops syntherus Thomas, 1965

Species of snake

Typhlops syntherus (common names: Barahona Peninsula blindsnake, Barahona worm snake) is a species of snake in the family Typhlopidae. It is endemic to the island of Hispaniola and occurs in both Haiti and the Dominican Republic. It is oviparous. It is a relatively common species but occurs in an area with dense human population where it is threatened by habitat loss.
