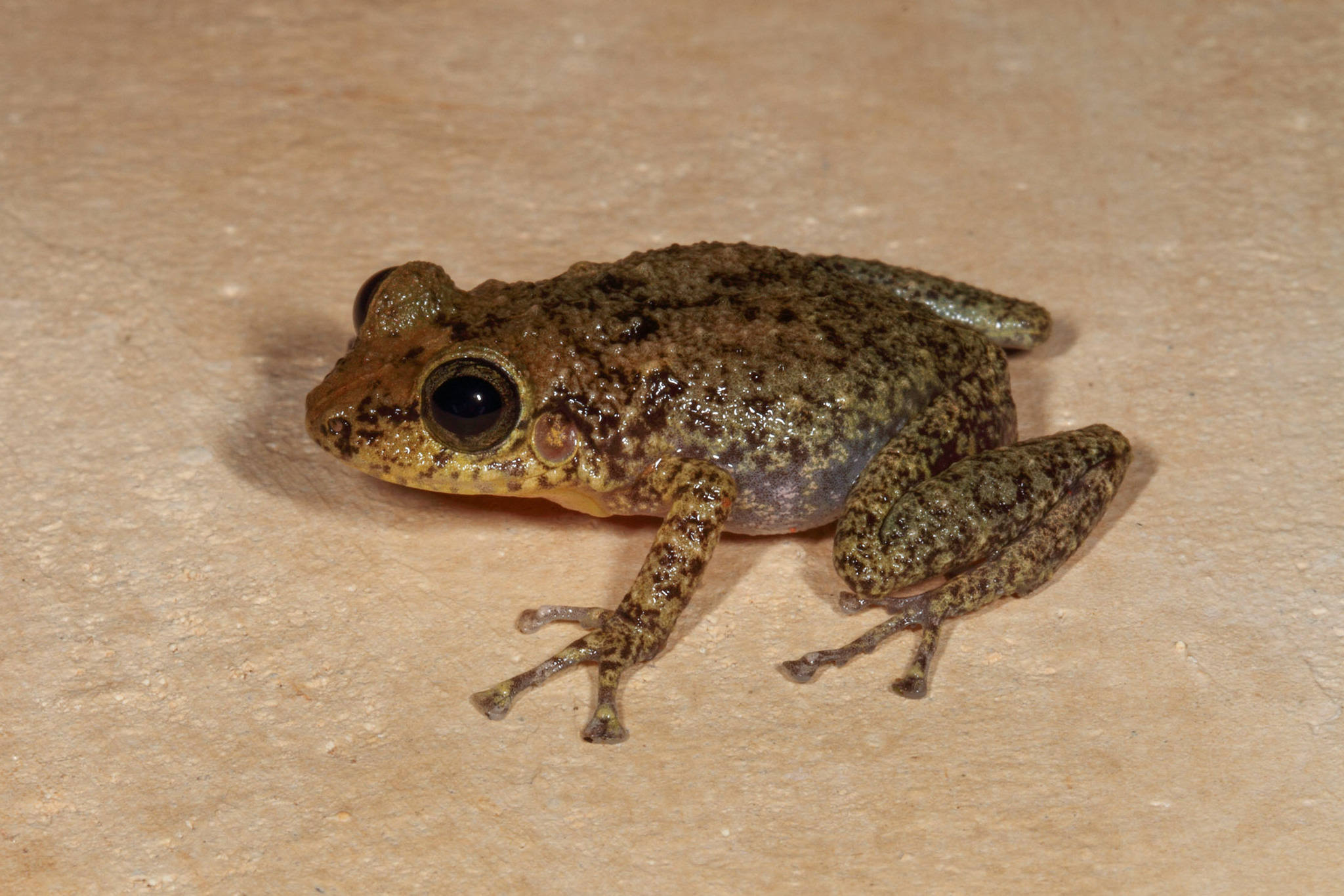

Conservation status
- Near Threatened (IUCN 3.1)

Scientific classification
- Kingdom: Animalia
- Phylum: Chordata
- Class: Amphibia
- Order: Anura
- Clade: Brachycephaloidea
- Family: Eleutherodactylidae
- Genus: Eleutherodactylus
- Species: E. flavescens

Binomial name
- Eleutherodactylus flavescens Noble, 1923

= Eleutherodactylus flavescens =

Species of frog

Eleutherodactylus flavescens is a species of frog in the family Eleutherodactylidae endemic to the eastern Dominican Republic. Its natural habitats are mesic forest, and occasionally, mangroves. It is a very common frog in suitable habitat, but has declined in parts of its range. It is threatened by habitat loss caused by infrastructure development (including for tourism) and agricultural encroachment.
