= Eleutherodactylus montanus =

Hispaniolan montane frog

Conservation status
- Endangered (IUCN 3.1)

Scientific classification
- Kingdom: Animalia
- Phylum: Chordata
- Class: Amphibia
- Order: Anura
- Clade: Brachycephaloidea
- Family: Eleutherodactylidae
- Genus: Eleutherodactylus
- Species: E. montanus

Binomial name
- Eleutherodactylus montanus Schmidt, 1919

Species of amphibian

Eleutherodactylus montanus, the Dominican mountain robber frog or Hispaniolan montane frog is a species of frog in the family Eleutherodactylidae.

== Distribution and habitat ==
It is endemic to the Cordillera Central mountain range of the Dominican Republic, at elevations of 1,270–2,424 m (4,167–7,953 ft) asl. Its natural habitat is closed-canopy forest and forest remnants. It is typically found in the fern understory, where males call from low vegetation.

== Conservation ==
It is threatened by habitat loss caused by agriculture and by disturbance from ecotourism.
