= Eleutherodactylus probolaeus =

Conservation status
- Endangered (IUCN 3.1)

Scientific classification
- Kingdom: Animalia
- Phylum: Chordata
- Class: Amphibia
- Order: Anura
- Family: Eleutherodactylidae
- Genus: Eleutherodactylus
- Subgenus: Euhyas
- Species: E. probolaeus

Binomial name
- Eleutherodactylus probolaeus Schwartz, 1965

Synonyms
- Eleutherodactylus pictissimus probolaeus Schwartz, 1965

Species of frog

Eleutherodactylus probolaeus is a species of frog in the family Eleutherodactylidae endemic to the La Romana Province, Dominican Republic, at elevations of 0–60 m (0–197 ft) asl. Its natural habitat is low elevation semi-mesic broadleaf forest. It is moderately common in suitable habitat but threatened by habitat loss, mainly caused by tourism and agriculture.
