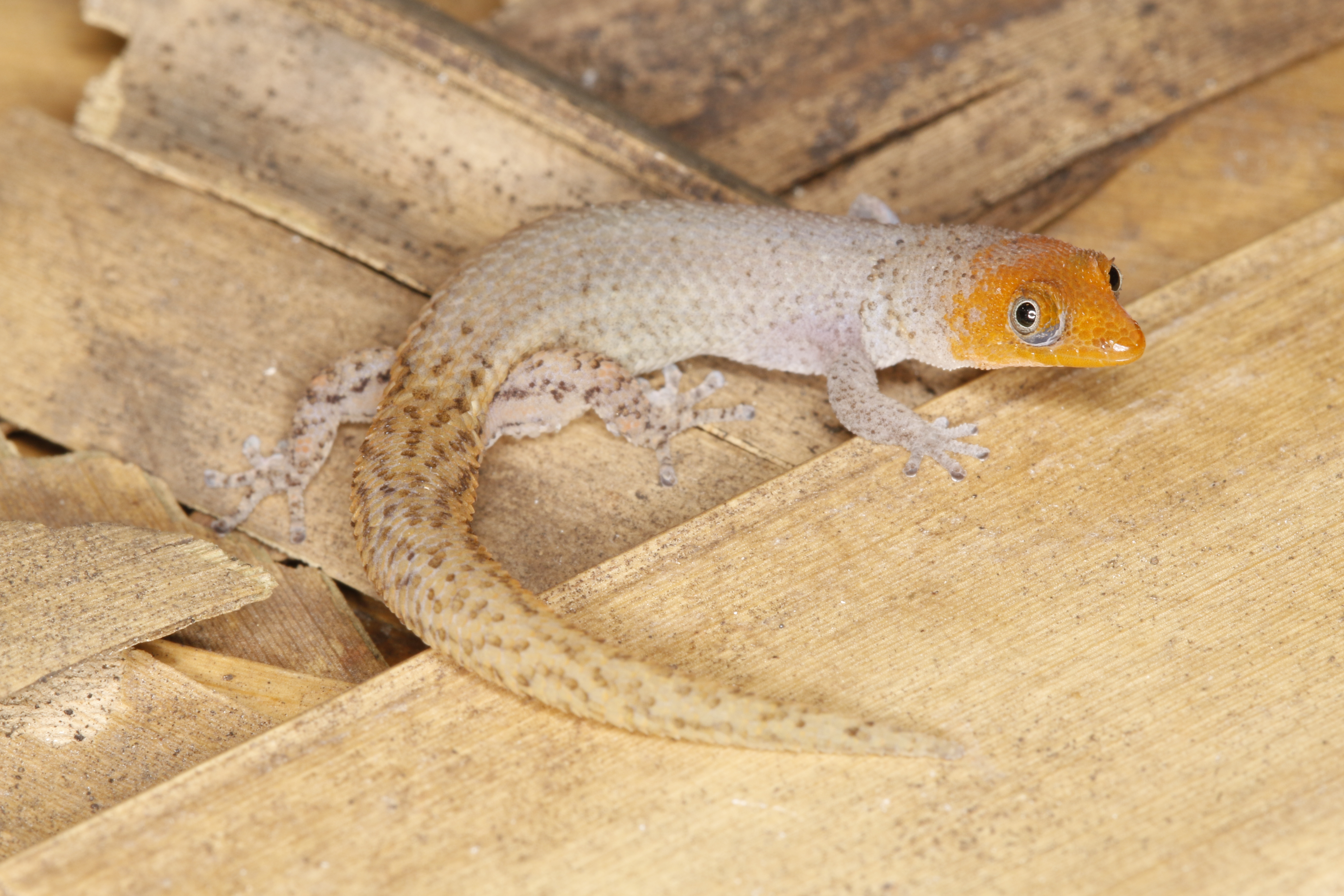

Conservation status
- Endangered (IUCN 3.1)

Scientific classification
- Kingdom: Animalia
- Phylum: Chordata
- Class: Reptilia
- Order: Squamata
- Suborder: Gekkota
- Family: Sphaerodactylidae
- Genus: Sphaerodactylus
- Species: S. plummeri

Binomial name
- Sphaerodactylus plummeri Thomas & Hedges, 1992

= Barahona big-scaled sphaero =

Species of lizard

The Barahona big-scaled sphaero (Sphaerodactylus plummeri), also known commonly as the Barahona big-scaled geckolet, is a species of lizard in the family Sphaerodactylidae. The species, which is a very small gecko, is endemic to the Dominican Republic.

== Taxonomic history ==
Originally described as a species new to science in 1992 by herpetologists Richard Thomas and Blair Hedges, it is named after Nicholas Plummer who was one of the collectors of the holotype.

== Morphology ==
S. plummeri is a relatively small species of Sphaerodactylus that has very large, flattened, keeled dorsal scales. This character is diagnostic, and distinguishes this species from S. streptophorus, S. armstrongi and S. ariasae, all of which are closely related to S. plummeri, but have considerably smaller dorsal scales.

Dosal ground color is pale brownish to grayish, distinctly speckled with darker brown to black scales. These markings can be aligned forming fragmented dorsolateral stripes which are more defined in the scapular and sacral region. This species is sexually dichromatic, as males usually develop orange heads as they mature.

== Distribution and habitat ==
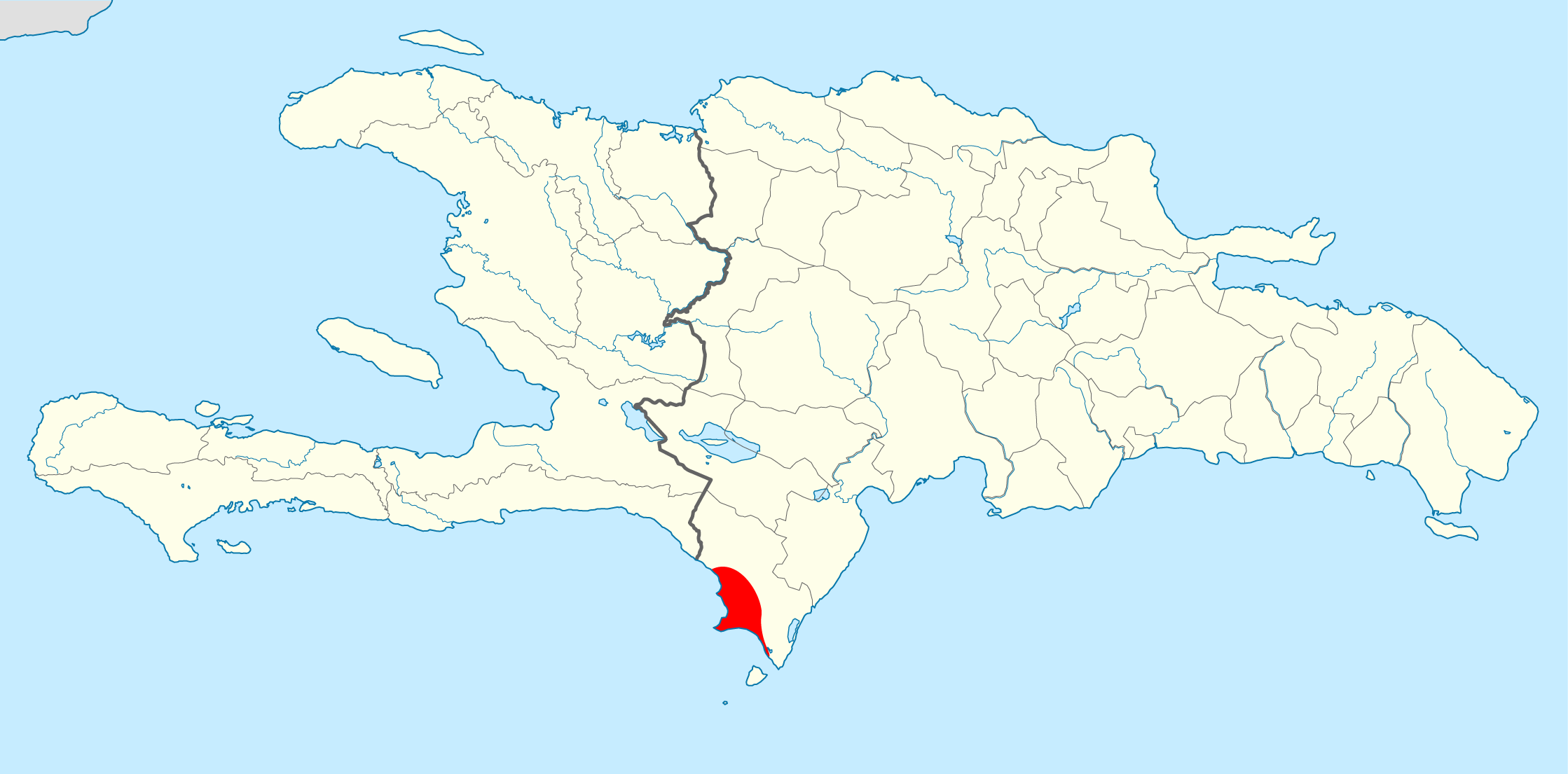
Distribution of Sphaerodactylus plummeri (known range; red).

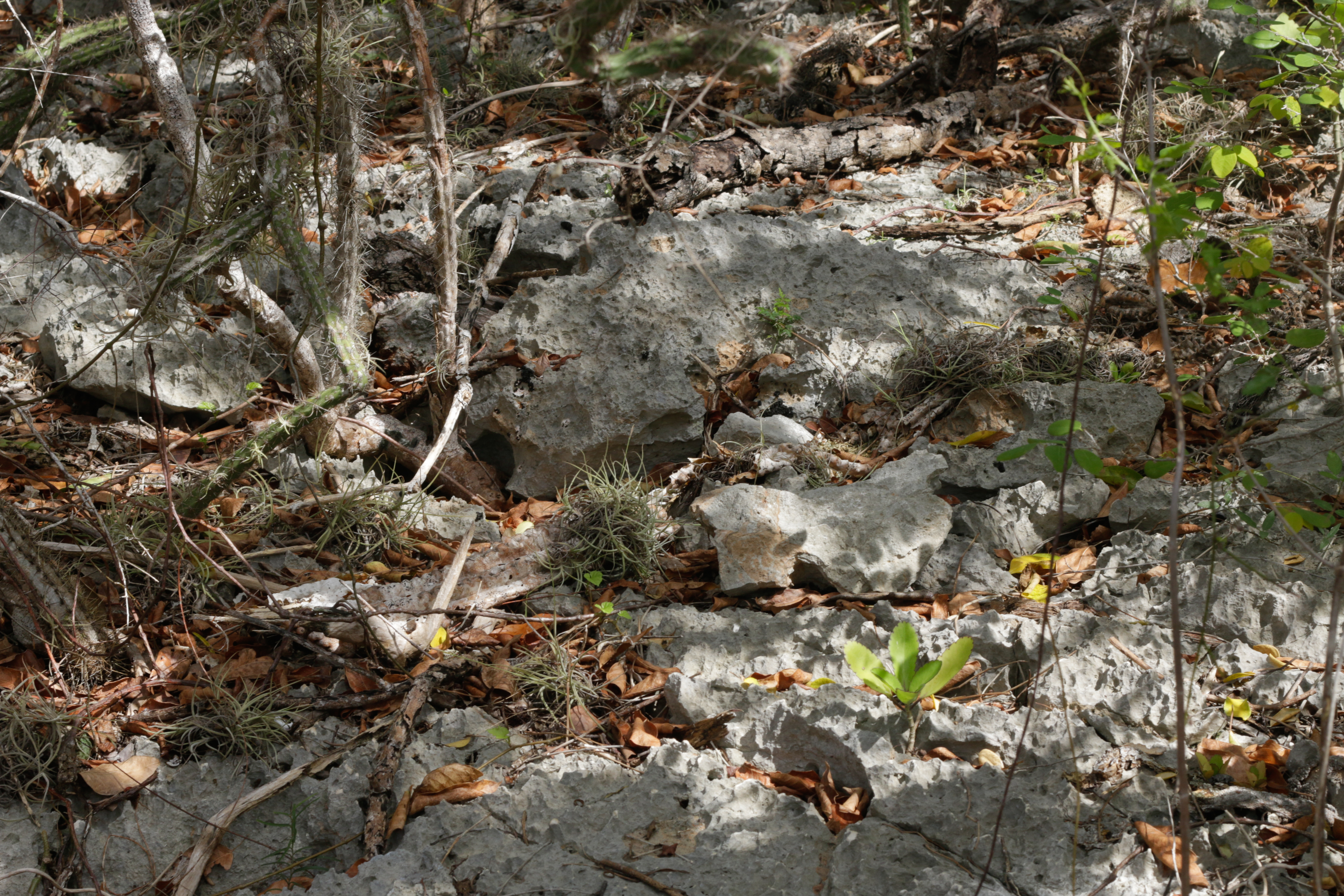
Habitat of Sphaerodactylus plummeri in Parque Nacional Jaragua, Dominican Republic.

S. plummeri is endemic to the south-western portions of the Barahona peninsula. This species inhabits karstic, xeric scrublands at altitudes of 0–100 m (0–328 ft).

== Ecology ==
S. plummeri is a terrestrial species that has been found under piles of organic debris including the decaying rosettes of dead Agave, and under piles of dry palm fronds.

It is sympatric with other reptiles including another species of the same genus, S. thompsoni. Although they share the same habitat, niche segregation is especially evident in these two species, as S. plummeri is usually associated with decaying organic matter, while S. thompsoni is saxicolous and associated with the karst itself. Other reptiles and amphibians known to be sympatric with S. plummeri include: Leiocephalus barahonensis, Anolis brevirostris, A. olssoni, A. longitibialis, Pholidoscelis lineolatus, P. taeniurus, P. chrysolaemus, Celestus curtissi, Hypsirhynchus parvifrons, Uromacer frenatus and Eleutherodactylus alcoae.

S. plummeri is oviparous.

== Images ==
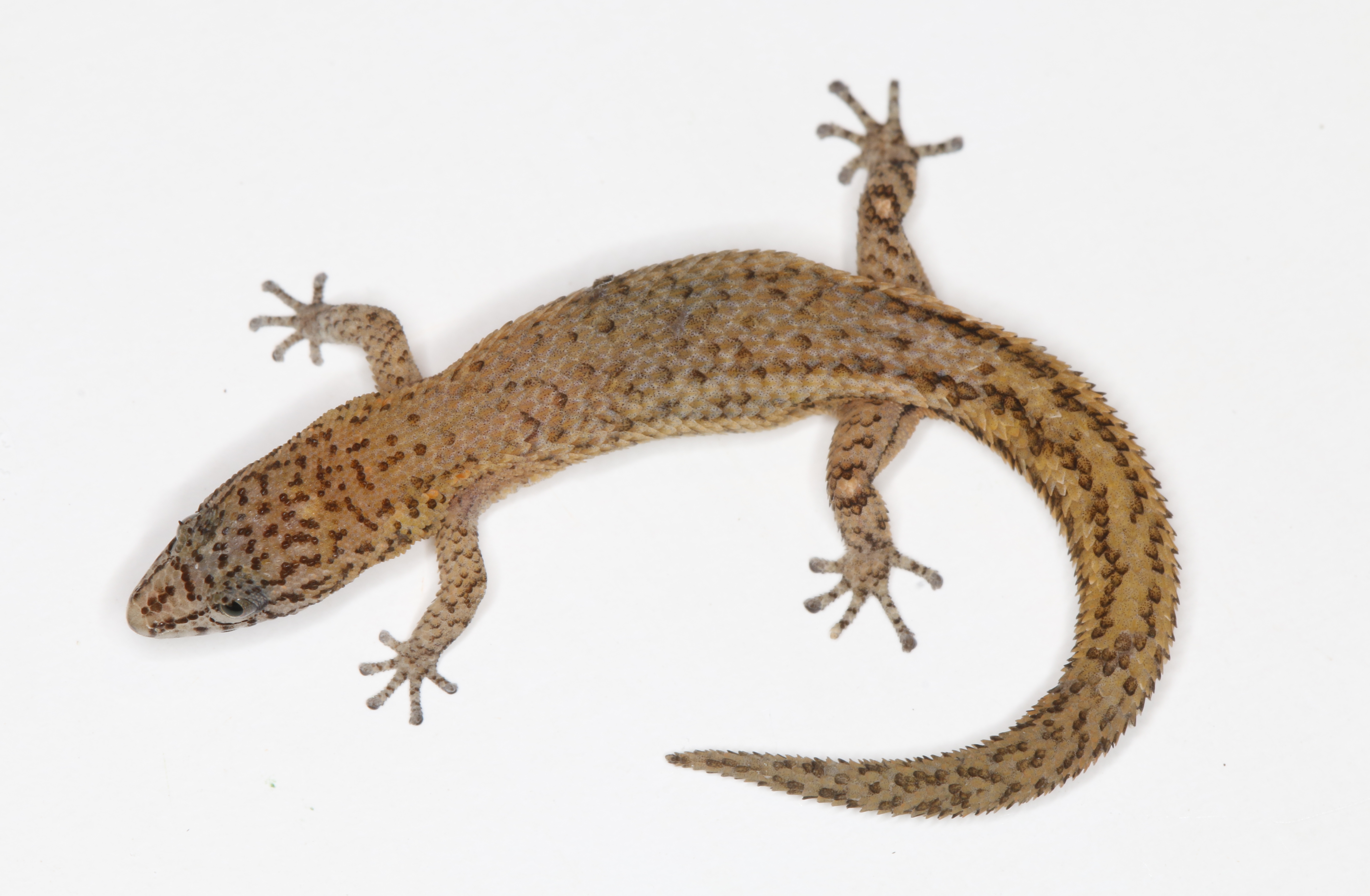
Adult female Sphaerodactylus plummeri from Parque Nacional Jaragua, Dominican Republic.

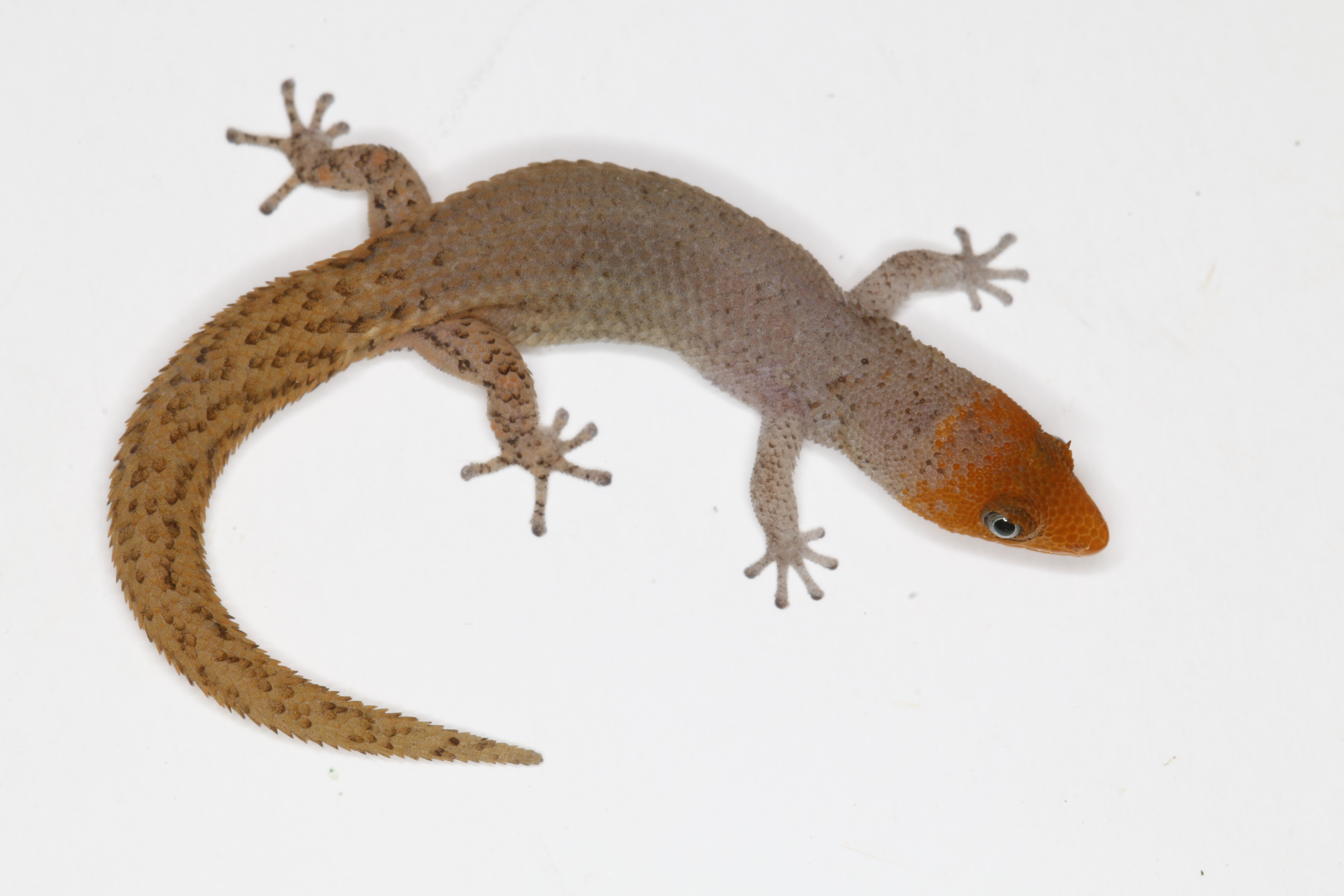
Adult male Sphaerodactylus plummeri from Parque Nacional Jaragua, Dominican Republic.
