= Anacaona National Park =

National park in the Dominican Republic

- IUCN category II (national park)
- Location within the Dominican Republic
- Interactive map of Anacaona National Park
- Location: Dominican Republic
- Coordinates: 18.60°N 71.13°W
- Area: 538.93 km^{2} (208.08 sq mi)
- Designation: National Park
- Designated: 2009

Parque Nacional Anacaona is a protected area in the southwestern Dominican Republic, spanning 583.93 km² across the provinces of Barahona, Azua, San Juan, and Baoruco. The park encompasses diverse ecosystems, including dry forests, transitional forests, mixed forests, and humid forests, with notable geological formations and biodiversity.

== History and establishment ==
Parque Nacional Anacaona was established by Decree 571-09 under IUCN Category II (National Park), with the aim of protecting the virgin forests of the eastern Sierra de Neyba, as well as the faults, canyons, and meanders that resulted from geological shifts that altered the course of the Yaque del Sur River.

=== Name ===
The park's name refers to the Queen Anacaona (1474-1503) of Taino origin, who ruled the Chiefdom of Jaragua after the death of her brother Bohechío. She was condemned to death by hanging by Governor Nicolás de Ovando.

== Geography ==
The park protects a vast area of dry forest on the eastern side of the Sierra de Neiba. It consists of a mountainous region with elevations ranging from 80 to 950 meters above sea level.

=== Geology ===
The region's geological history includes significant fault lines and land shifts that altered the course of the Yaque del Sur River redirecting its outflow from Azua to its current drainage in near Barahona. The park contains volcanic and sedimentary rock formations dating back to the late Quaternary period.

=== Climate ===
The park features diverse climatic conditions due to its varied topography. Temperatures range from 23°C in humid forested areas to 25°C in exposed lowland regions. Annual rainfall varies between 400 and 1,000 mm, with wetter conditions at higher elevations.

=== Hydrology ===
Despite the predominance of dry forest ecosystems, the park contains several key water sources, including portions of the Yaque del Sur River and some of its tributaries. These waterways are essential for agriculture in the surrounding valleys. The park also harbors a freshwater wetland, Laguna Caney, an anomaly within an otherwise arid matrix. This small, high-altitude lagoon supports species that are otherwise absent or rare in the surrounding dry forests, functioning as a refugium.

== Biodiversity ==
The park's varied topography, spanning from lowland dry forests to montane humid ecosystems, creates sharp environmental gradients that drive species differentiation and niche specialization. This results in a biota that is not only diverse but also highly structured, with taxa occupying distinct ecological compartments shaped by climate, substrate, and evolutionary history.

=== Flora ===
Vegetation follows a clear altitudinal gradient. Lowland forests are dominated by drought-tolerant species such as Neltuma juliflora and Bursera simaruba. Mid-elevation zones transition into mixed forests featuring Swietenia mahagoni and Amyris elemifera. At higher elevations, increased precipitation sustains mesic species like Ocotea coriacea and Clusia rosea, forming a stratified plant community shaped by temperature and moisture gradients.

=== Fauna ===
Faunal diversity is similarly stratified, with avian, reptilian, and amphibian assemblages occupying distinct ecological niches. The park holds significant conservation value as part of the Hispaniolan Endemic Bird Area, hosting species such as Amazona ventralis, Todus subulatus, and Geotrygon leucometopia. The area hosts a rich diversity of reptiles. Two iguana species inhabit the area: the critically endangered Cyclura ricordii and the more common Cyclura cornuta. Among the lizards, Leiocephalus semilineatus is present, alongside species from the Pholidoscelis, Comptus, and Panolopus genera. Along with several geckos like Aristelliger expectatus and Sphaerodactylus leucaster. Anoles, including Anolis distichus, A. brevirostris, A. aridius, A. saxatilis, A. semilineatus, and A. olssoni, exhibit microhabitat partitioning, with their distribution patterns influenced by perch selection and thermoregulation requirements. Snake species include several endemics, such as Haitiophis anomalus and Chilabothrus fordii, along with representatives from the Hypsirhinchus, Uromacer, and Typhlops genera. Trachemys turtles can also be found in the park's aquatic habitats. Water bodies also support fish species such as Nandopsis haitiensis, Limia melanonotata, and Poecilia hispaniolana, alongside amphibians including Peltophryne guentheri.

== Conservation ==
Anthropogenic influence on the park is manifested in the form of introduced species like Sus scrofa (feral pig), Capra hircus (creole goat), and illegal wood harvesting.
