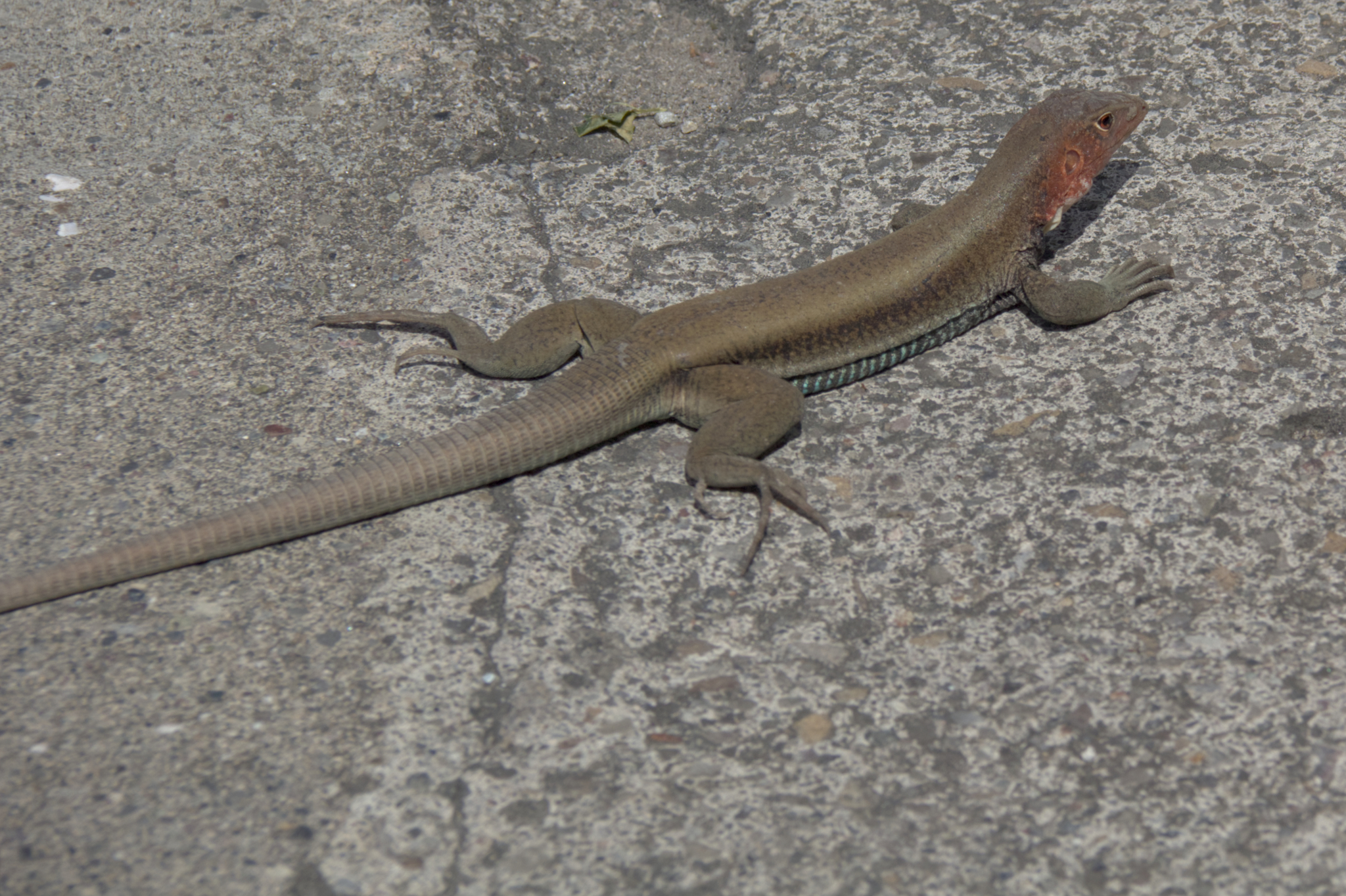

Conservation status
- Near Threatened (IUCN 3.1)

Scientific classification
- Kingdom: Animalia
- Phylum: Chordata
- Class: Reptilia
- Order: Squamata
- Family: Teiidae
- Genus: Pholidoscelis
- Species: P. erythrocephalus

Binomial name
- Pholidoscelis erythrocephalus (Shaw, 1802)

Synonyms
- Lacerta erythrocephala Shaw, 1802; Ameiva erythrocephala Daudin, 1802; Amiva erythrops Cope, 1871; Ameiva erythrops (Cope, 1871); Ameiva nevisana Schmidt, 1920

= St. Christopher ameiva =

Species of lizard

The St. Christopher ameiva (Pholidoscelis erythrocephalus), also known as the orange-faced whiptail, orange-tailed ameiva or red-tailed ground lizard, is a species of lizard belonging to the family Teiidae, which includes the whiptails and related species. This lizard is found on the Caribbean island of Sint Eustatius, and on Saint Kitts and Nevis, where it is scarcer.

== Taxonomy ==
The St. Christopher ameiva was first formally described in early 1802 by George Shaw as Lacerta erythrocephala, with its type locality given as Saint Christopher. It was also described in August 1802 by François Marie Daudin as Ameiva erythrocephala, though as Shaw's work was published at least seven months prior to Daudin's, his name had priority. In 2016, it was reclassified into a new genus as Pholidoscelis erythrocephala, along with other West Indies ameiva species, and placed in the P. plei species group, also called the Lesser Antillean clade. The genus Pholidoscelis was originally proposed by Leopold Fitzinger in 1843, with the extinct Ameiva major as its type species by monotypy. The genus Pholidoscelis is classified within the subfamily Teiinae of the family Teiidae.

== Description ==
The St Christopher ameiva has a maximum snout-vent length of 140 mm (5.5 in) in males and 103 mm (4.1 in) in females. The back and sides have a dark olive green background colour with darker vermiculations, darkest on the sides. The head is also dark olive green, but as the lizard grows, this becomes progessively redder: there is a small area of pink on the snout of juveniles, but in larger specimens the red colour extends to behind the ears. The chin and throat are white, frequently showing some orange tint, and the underside is white. The juveniles also have four thin cream stripes, two on the back and one on each side, but these fade as the individual grows. There are rows of blue scales along the lower sides in the larger adults; in large males this blue extends onto the upper parts of the legs.

== Distribution and habitat ==
The St Christopher ameiva is endemic to the islands of the Saint Christopher Bank. it is abundant on Sint Eustatius, but is only locally common on St Kitts and Nevis, possibly due to predation by the introduced Small Indian mongoose (Urva auropunctata) on these islands. It can be found in forests, parks and gardens.

The species lays one or two eggs in nests underground, with nest depths of 30-55 centimeters. Sometimes St. Christopher ameiva's lay their eggs in the nests of Lesser Antillean iguanas (Iguana delicatissima).
