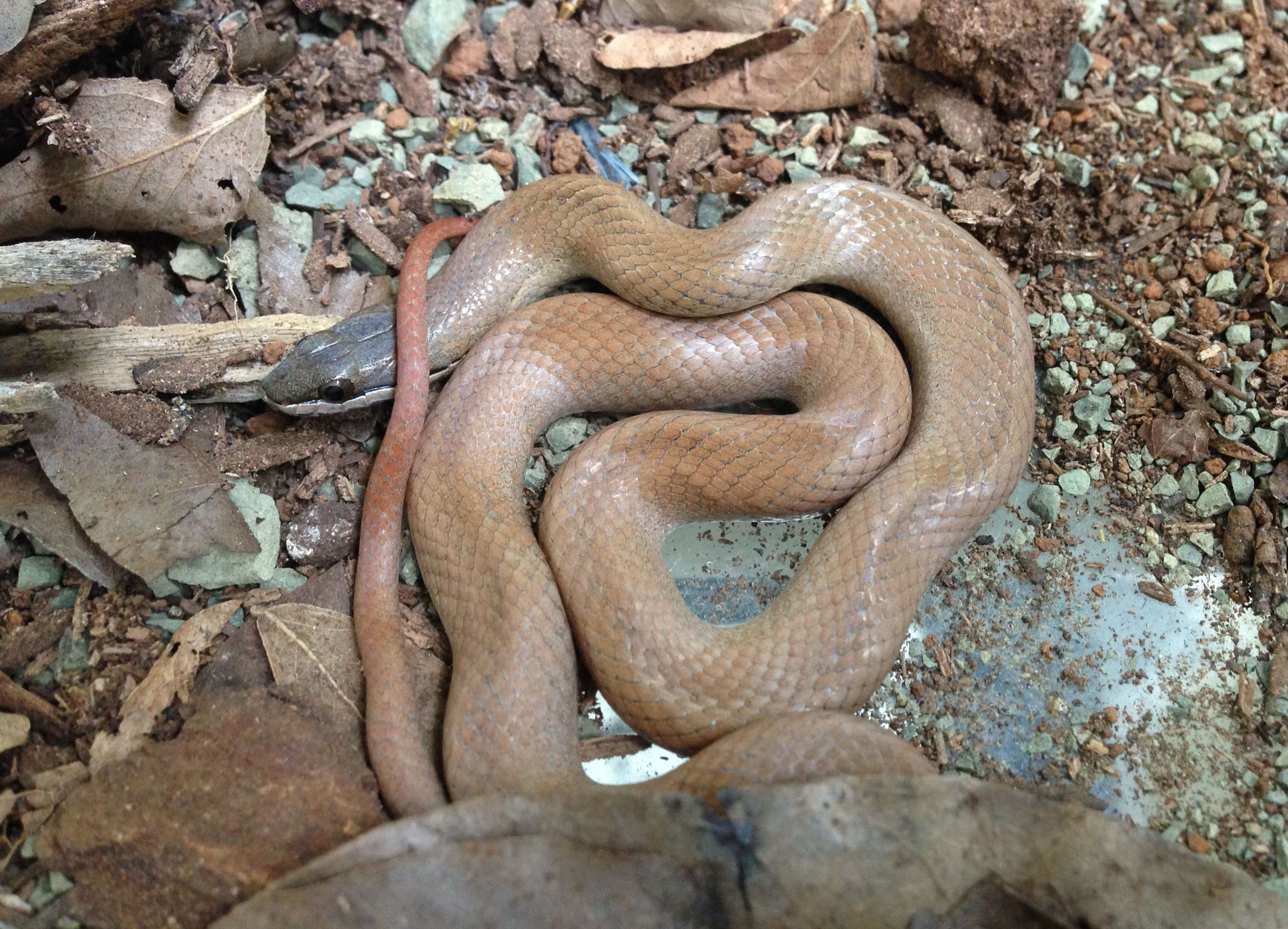

Conservation status
- Endangered (IUCN 3.1)

Scientific classification
- Kingdom: Animalia
- Phylum: Chordata
- Class: Reptilia
- Order: Squamata
- Suborder: Serpentes
- Family: Colubridae
- Genus: Ialtris
- Species: I. agyrtes

Binomial name
- Ialtris agyrtes Schwartz & Rossman, 1976
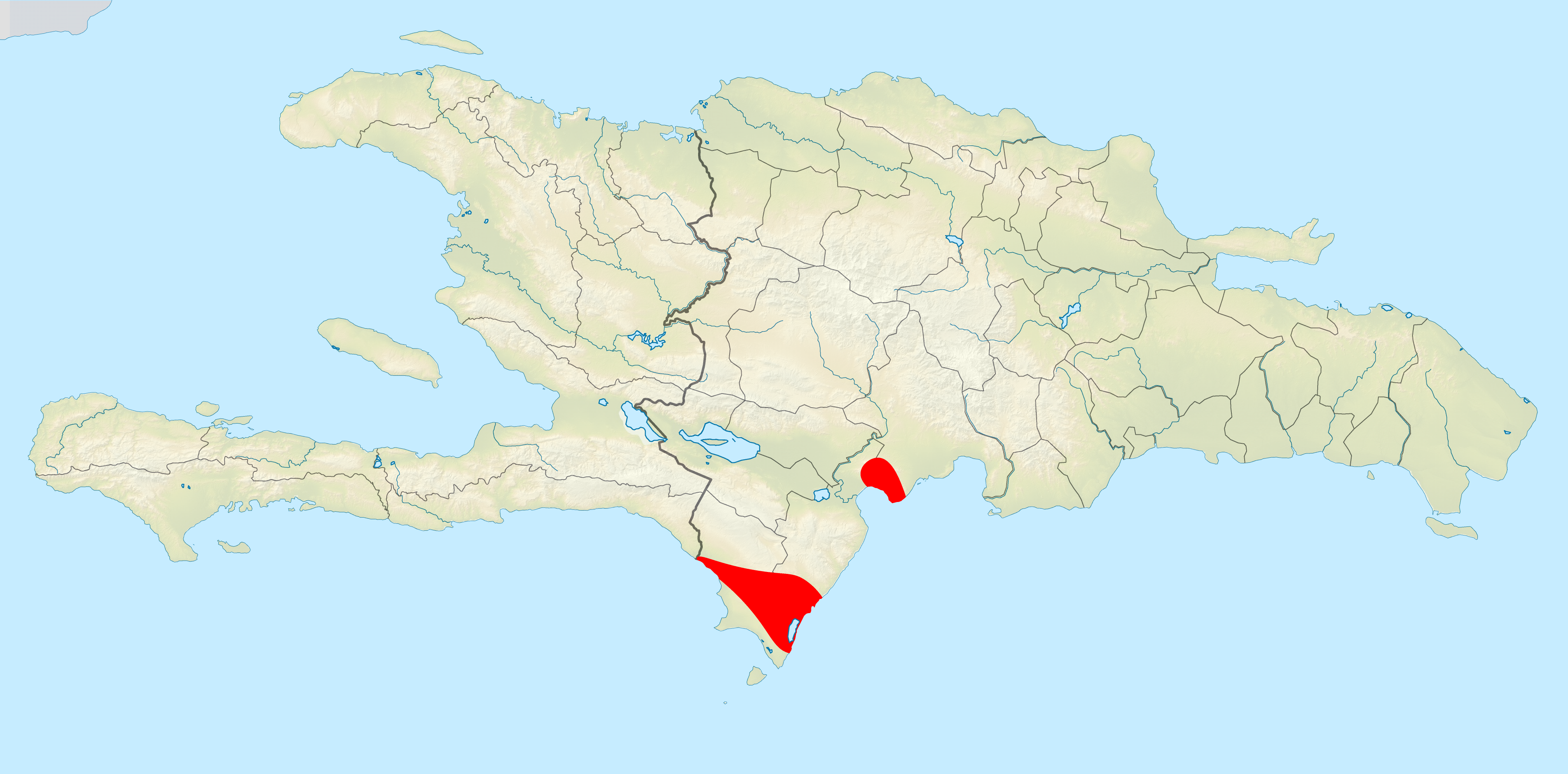
- Known geographic range of Ialtris agyrtes in red

= Ialtris agyrtes =

Species of reptile

Ialtris agyrtes, also known commonly as the Barahona red-headed racer and the Barreras fanged snake, is a rare species of snake in the subfamily Dipsadinae of the family Colubridae. The species is endemic to the southwestern Dominican Republic.

== Taxonomy ==
Ialtris agyrtes was described in 1976 by Albert Schwartz and Douglas A. Rossman. The holotype (LSUM 28564) is an adult female from Barreras, Azua, Dominican Republic, and was captured by a native collector on 25 July 1969.

== Etymology ==
The specific name, agyrtes, has Greek origin, translating to "mimic, cheat", and bears reference to the superficial resemblance of this species to the related Ialtris parishi.

== Description ==
Ialtris agyrtes is a small species of Ialtris with a nearly patternless, brown to tan dorsum. A pale whitish supralabial line is present, extending from the tip of the snout to the base of the head, and with a darker brown superior margin. The venter is also patternless, nearly white, and grading posteriorly to pale orange.

== Behavior ==
Ialtris agyrtes is a terrestrial species, with semi-fossorial habits.

== Geographic distribution and habitat ==
Ialtris agyrtes is only known from three localities. Its range includes the southern foothills of the Sierra de Bahoruco mountain range in the Barahona Peninsula; as well as the lower elevations of Sierra Martín Garcia National Park. In these three locations the habitat is very similar, suggesting this species might be a specialist, inhabiting mid-elevation dry forests. The altitudinal distribution recorded is 20 to 541 m (66 to 1,775 ft). Specimens have been found under stones, and organic debris including the decaying rosettes of dead Agave, which are particularly abundant in its habitat.

== Diet ==
The diet of Ialtris agyrtes is known to include blind-snakes (family Typhlopidae), and it has been hypothesized that this species could have a specialized ophiophagous diet of fossorial snakes. Other blind-snakes of the genus Mitophis (family Leptotyphlopidae), as well as snake-like lizards (Wetmorena agasepsoides) are known to be sympatric with I. agyrtes and could be part of its diet as well. Another species of the same genus, Ialtris haetianus, is considered to be a specialist feeding on frogs of the genus Eleutherodactylus, along with their eggs. Since frogs are very abundant in the cloud forest habitat of I. haetianus, and blind-snakes are very abundant in the dry forest habitat of I. agyrtes, it could be considered that these to snakes occupy similar niches in distinct habitats.

== Reproduction ==
Ialtris agyrtes is oviparous.

== Conservation ==
Ialtris agyrtes is listed as Endangered by the IUCN Red List of Endangered Species, due to its limited distribution and the ongoing destruction of its habitat.

Although this species is known to occur in at least two protected areas (Parque Nacional Jaragua and Parque Nacional Sierra Martín García), the particular dry forest habitat occupied by this species has received a lot of pressure resulting from heavy exploitation for charcoal production. Illegal agriculture, cattle grazing and wood harvesting also takes place in both national parks, and protection measures are poorly enforced.

An invasive species, the small Indian mongoose (Urva auropunctata) has been highly suspected to represent a threat for I. agyrtes, given its diurnal and terrestrial habits. It is also possible that this has always been a rare species, and that populations are not declining, as it has never been reported to be abundant in past.

The conservation of this species has received very little attention, and there are currently no conservation measures taking place.
