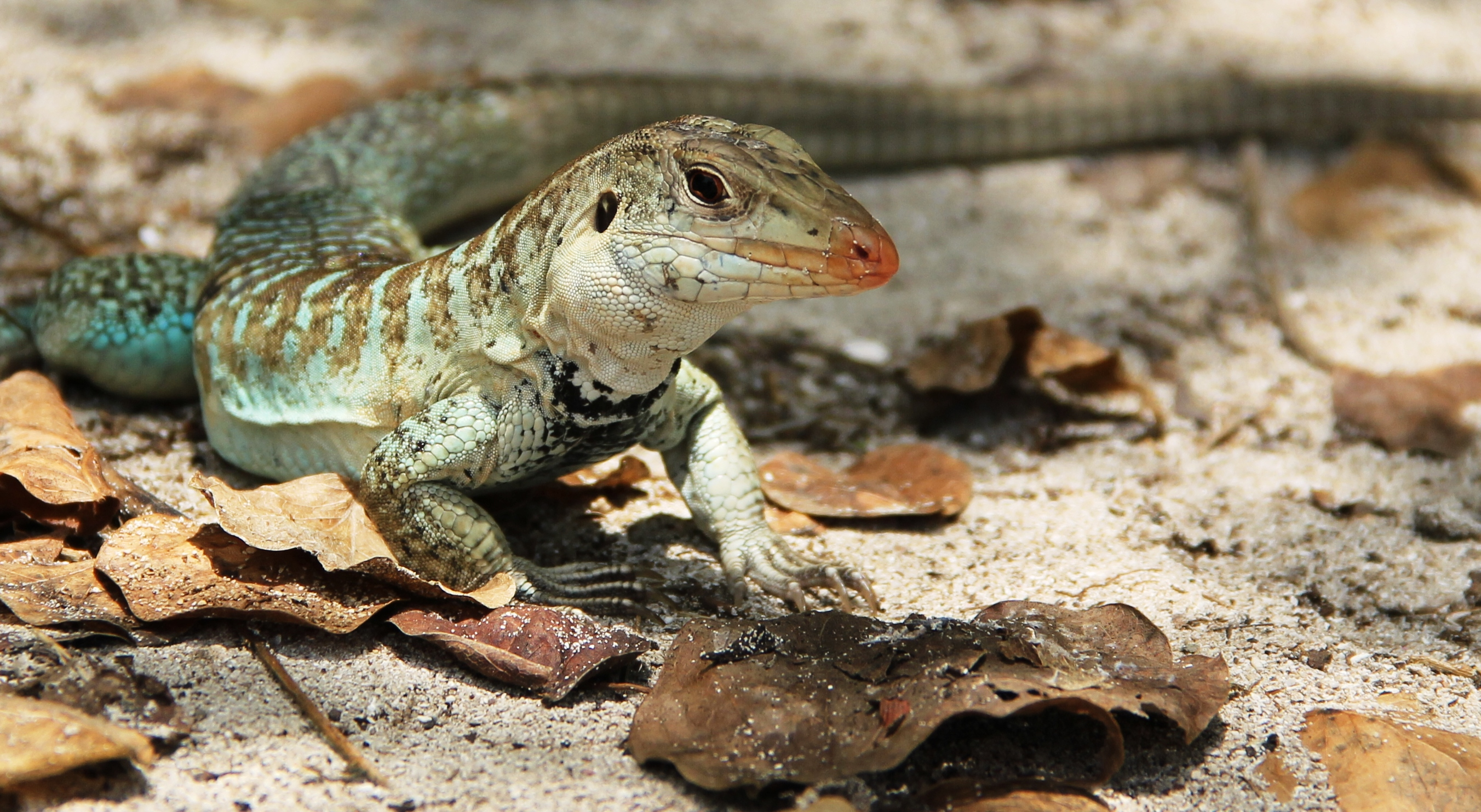

Conservation status
- Near Threatened (IUCN 3.1)

Scientific classification
- Kingdom: Animalia
- Phylum: Chordata
- Class: Reptilia
- Order: Squamata
- Family: Teiidae
- Genus: Pholidoscelis
- Species: P. griswoldi

Binomial name
- Pholidoscelis griswoldi (Barbour, 1916)

Synonyms
- Ameiva griswoldi Barbour, 1916

= Griswold's ameiva =

Species of lizard

Griswold's ameiva (Pholidoscelis griswoldi), also known as the Antiguan ameiva, is a species of lizard in the family Teiidae. The species is endemic to Antigua and Barbuda, where it is found on both islands. It is also known commonly as the Antiguan ameiva and the Antiguan ground lizard.

== Taxonomy ==
Griswod's ameiva was first formally described as Ameiva griswoldi in 1916 by the American herpetologist Thomas Barbour, with its type locality given as St. John's, St. John Parish, Antigua. In 2016, it was reclassified into a new genus as Pholidoscelis griswoldi along with other West Indies ameiva species, and placed in the P. plei species group, also called the Lesset Antillean clade. The genus Pholidoscelis was originally proposed by Leopold Fitzinger in 1843, with the extinct Ameiva major as its type species by monotypy. The genus Pholidoscelis is classified within the subfamily Teiinae of the family Teiidae.

== Etymology ==
The specific name, griswoldi, is in honor of Dr. Donald W. Griswold, who was director of the Rockefeller West Indian Hookworm Commission.

== Description ==
Griswold's ameiva has a brownish background colour with bluish green vermiculations, a dark buish-green chest and lighter bluish-green on the belly. The legs are spotted and there is a pale stripe on the rear of the hindlimbs.

== Distribution and habitat ==
Griswold's ameiva is endemic to the nation of Antigua and Barbuda, where it is found on both Antigua and Barbuda, and the satellite islands to these islands. This lizard lives on the ground in open and sunny areas, although in Antigua it is only found in association with humans in built up areas.

== Biology ==
Griswold's ameiva is oviparous. It is an opportunistic forager and will eat birds' eggs, other lizards and scraps.

== See also ==
- Antiguan racer
