= Hispaniolan dry forests =

Ecoregion on Hispaniola

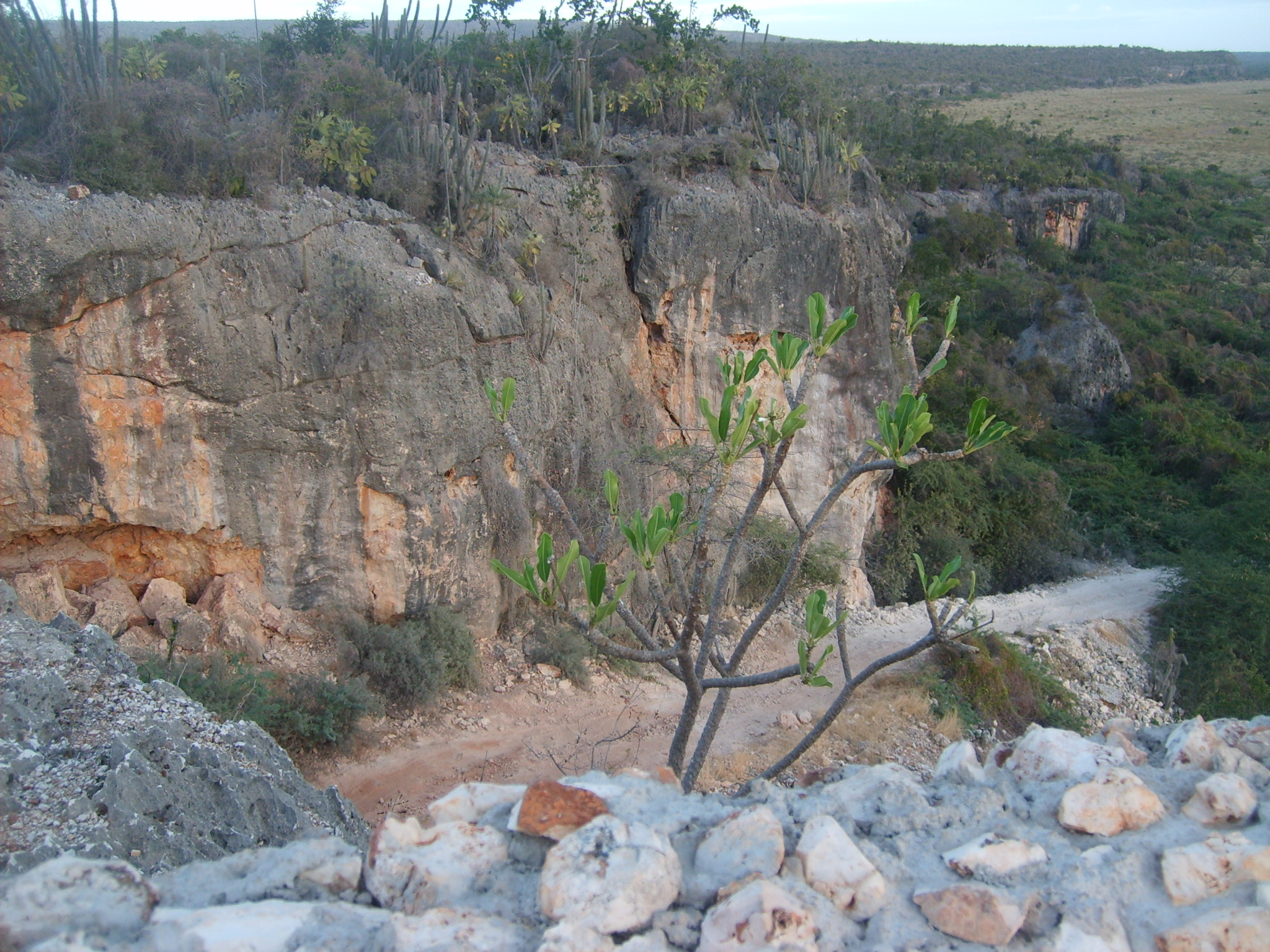
- Jaragua National Park, Dominican Republic

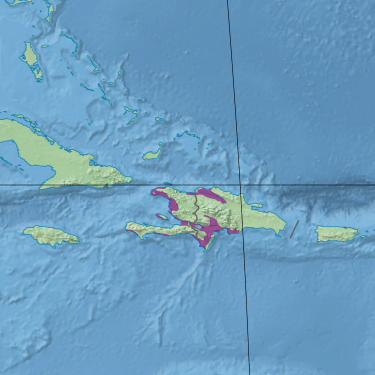
- Ecoregion territory (in purple)

Ecology
- Realm: Neotropical
- Biome: tropical and subtropical dry broadleaf forests
- Borders: Greater Antilles mangroves; Hispaniolan moist forests, Hispaniolan pine forests

Geography
- Area: 15,123 km^{2} (5,839 sq mi)
- Countries: Dominican Republic; Haiti

Conservation
- Conservation status: Critical/endangered
- Protected: 2,859 km^{2} (19%)

The Hispaniolan dry forests are a tropical dry broadleaf forest ecoregion on the island of Hispaniola (split between the Dominican Republic and Haiti). They cover 15,123 km^{2} (5,839 sq mi), around 20% of the island's area.

== Geography ==
The dry forests are found mostly on the southern and western portions of the island of Hispaniola, covering portions of both the Dominican Republic and Haiti. The ecoregion covers the southern and western coastal lowlands, the Cul-de-Sac–Enriquillo lowland, and the Cibao Valley in the north-central portion of the island.

== Flora ==
Plant communities include high dry forest and cactus scrub dominated by species of Prosopis, Pilosocereus, Hippomane, Cylindropuntia, Agave, and Bursera, as well as Melocactus lemairei.

== Fauna ==
Given the climate, reptiles are numerous in this region. Species found include Ricord's iguanas (Cyclura ricordii), rhinoceros iguanas (C. cornuta), Hispaniola racers (Haitiophis anomalus), and Barreras fanged snakes (Ialtris agyrtes). A 2017 study found that extinct giant tortoises (Chelonoidis marcanoi) found on Hispaniola were specialists adapted to dry, open habitats and had a major role in shaping this ecoregion; following a decrease in the extent of these ecosystems after the end of the Pleistocene, these tortoises were restricted to refugia habitats up until their extinction.

== Protected areas ==
2,859 km^{2}, or 19%, of the ecoregion is in protected areas. Protected areas include Anacaona National Park, Canapé-Vert National Park, Francisco Alberto Caamaño Deñó National Park, Grand Bois National Park, Jaragua National Park (1535.5 km^{2}), La Gran Sabana National Park, Lagon des Huîtres National Park, Les Matheux National Park, Máximo Gómez National Park, Picky Lora National Park, Sierra de Bahoruco National Park (1091.8 km^{2}), Sierra Martín García National Park, Three Bays National Park, Arroyo Cano Forest Reserve (23.9 km^{2}), Barrero Forest Reserve (192.2 km^{2}), Cabeza de Toro Forest Reserve (5.9 km^{2}), Cerro de Bocanigua Forest Reserve (29.2 km^{2}), Carretera Cabral - Polo panoramic road (12 km^{2}), and Carretera Santiago - La Cumbre - Puerto Plata panoramic road (21 km^{2}).
