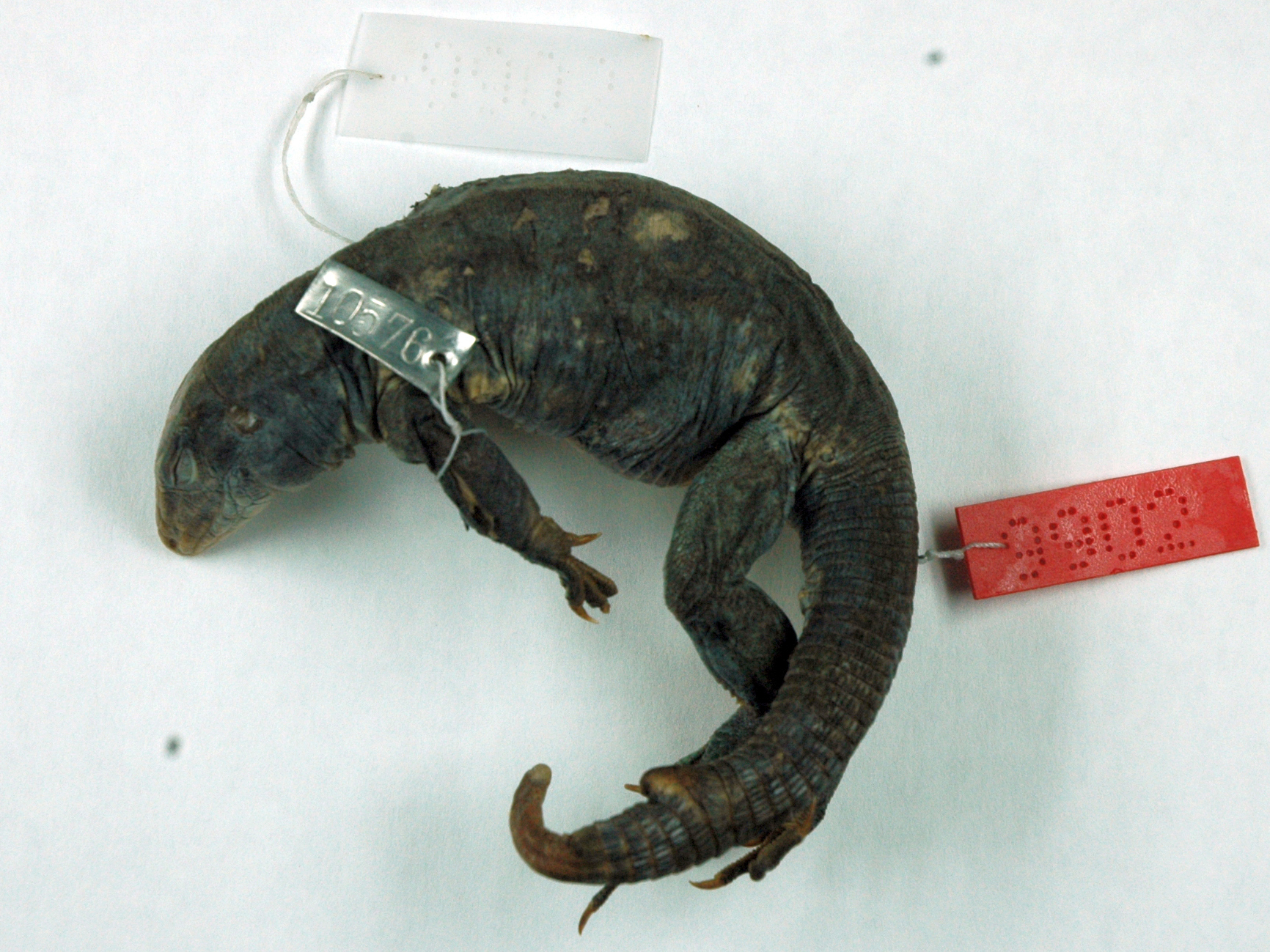

Conservation status
- Extinct (1928) (IUCN 3.1)

Scientific classification
- Kingdom: Animalia
- Phylum: Chordata
- Class: Reptilia
- Order: Squamata
- Suborder: Lacertoidea
- Family: Teiidae
- Genus: Pholidoscelis
- Species: †P. cineraceus

Binomial name
- †Pholidoscelis cineraceus (Barbour & Noble, 1915)
- Location of Guadeloupe

Synonyms
- Ameiva cineracea Barbour & Noble, 1915

= Guadeloupe ameiva =

Extinct species of lizard

The Guadeloupe ameiva (Pholidoscelis cineraceus) was a species of Teiidae lizards that was endemic to Guadeloupe. It is known from specimens collected by early European explorers. The fossil record shows that it once ranged across Guadeloupe, La Désirade, Marie-Galante, and Îles des Saintes, but in most recent times it was restricted to Grand Ilet, just offshore of Petit-Bourg. It was last recorded in 1914. Its extinction likely occurred when this area was decimated by a hurricane in 1928. The Guadeloupe ameiva was reported as a ground-dwelling lizard. It fed on plants and carrion (including dead individuals of its species).

== Taxonomy ==
The Guadeloupe ameiva described in 1915 as Ameiva cineracea. The type locality is Grand Ilet offshore of Petit-Bourg on the east coast of Basse-Terre, Guadeloupe. In 2016, the species was moved to Pholidoscelis based on genetic sequencing and phylogenetic analyses.
