= Pholidoscelis desechensis =

Scientific classification
- Domain: Eukaryota
- Kingdom: Animalia
- Phylum: Chordata
- Class: Reptilia
- Order: Squamata
- Family: Teiidae
- Genus: Pholidoscelis
- Species: P. desechensis

Binomial name
- Pholidoscelis desechensis (Heatwole & Torres, 1967)

Species of lizard

Pholidoscelis desechensis, the Desecheo ground lizard, is a member of the family Teiidae of lizards. It is endemic to Desecheo Island in Puerto Rico.
