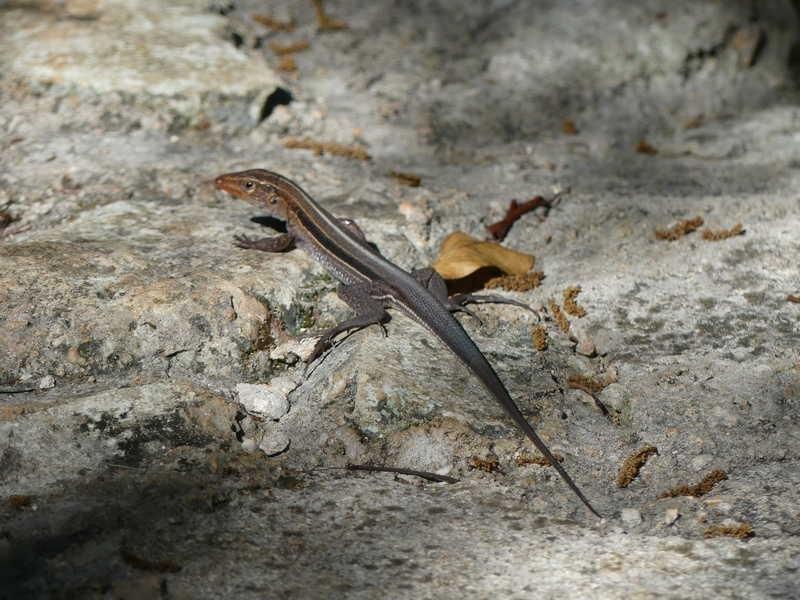

Conservation status
- Least Concern (IUCN 3.1)

Scientific classification
- Kingdom: Animalia
- Phylum: Chordata
- Class: Reptilia
- Order: Squamata
- Family: Teiidae
- Genus: Pholidoscelis
- Species: P. auberi

Binomial name
- Pholidoscelis auberi (Cocteau, 1838)

Synonyms
- Ameiva auberi Cocteau, 1838; Pholidoscelis auberi — Goicoechea et al., 2016

= Auber's ameiva =

Species of lizard

Auber's ameiva (Pholidoscelis auberi), also known commonly as the Cuban ameiva, is a species of lizard in the family Teiidae. The species is native to the Bahamas and Cuba. There are 40 recognized subspecies.

== Etymology ==
The specific name, auberi, is in honor of Cuban botanist Pedro Alejandro Auber (1786–1843).

== Habitat ==
The preferred natural habitats of P. auberi are shrubland and forest.

== Diet ==
P. auberi preys upon invertebrates.

== Reproduction ==
P. auberi is oviparous.

== Subspecies ==
Including the nominotypical subspecies, 40 subspecies of P. auberi are recognized as being valid. 25 of these subspecies are found on Cuba and its associated islets.
