= Ialtris dorsalis =

Conservation status
- Near Threatened (IUCN 3.1)

Scientific classification
- Kingdom: Animalia
- Phylum: Chordata
- Class: Reptilia
- Order: Squamata
- Suborder: Serpentes
- Family: Colubridae
- Genus: Ialtris
- Species: I. dorsalis

Binomial name
- Ialtris dorsalis (Günther, 1858)

Species of snake

Ialtris dorsalis, the Hispaniolan W-headed racer or brown fanged snake, is a species of snake in the family Colubridae. The species is native to the Dominican Republic.
