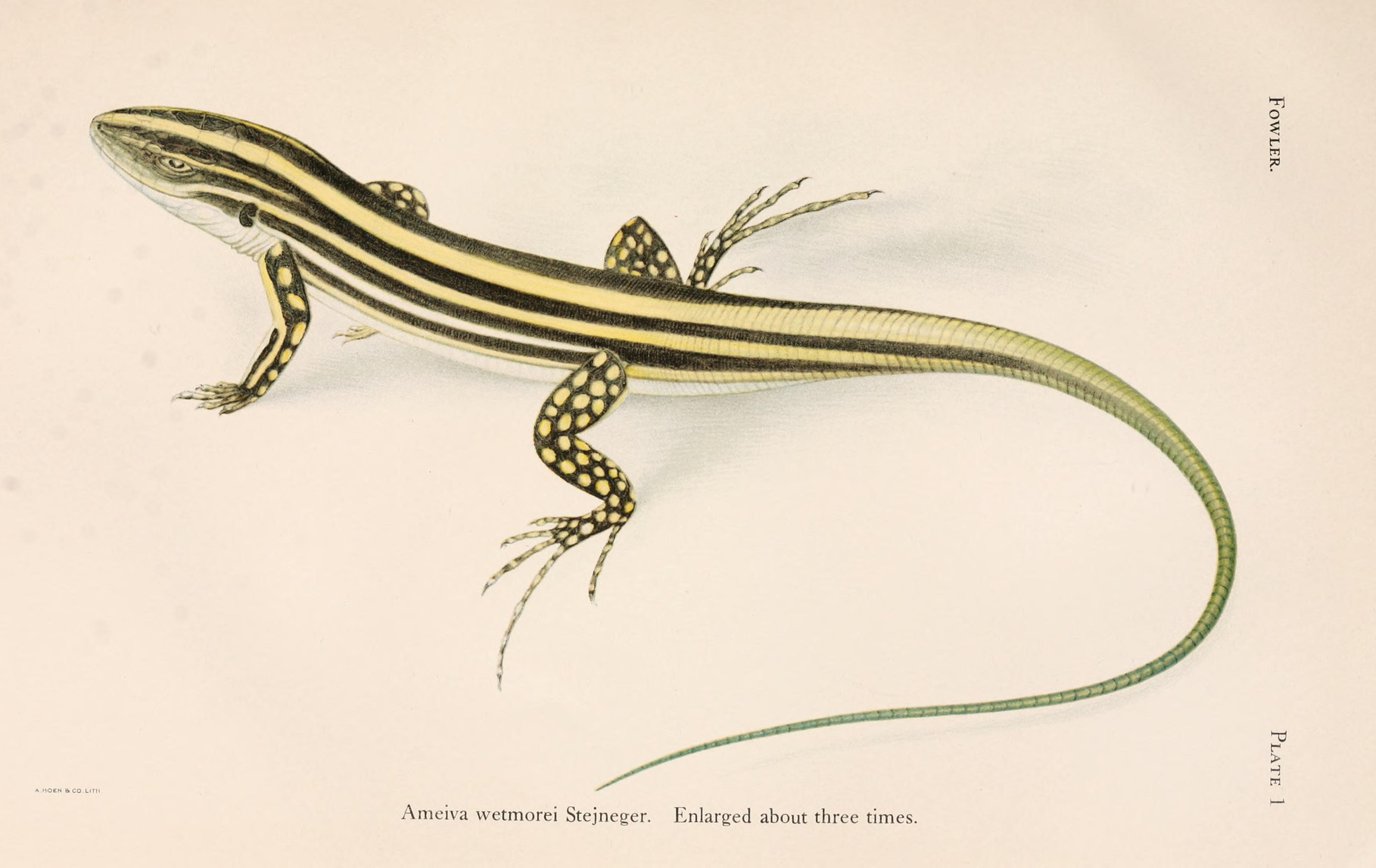

Conservation status
- Vulnerable (IUCN 3.1)

Scientific classification
- Kingdom: Animalia
- Phylum: Chordata
- Class: Reptilia
- Order: Squamata
- Family: Teiidae
- Genus: Pholidoscelis
- Species: P. wetmorei

Binomial name
- Pholidoscelis wetmorei (Stejneger, 1913)
- IUCN Red List range map of Pholidoscelis wetmorei, Version 2021-2

Synonyms
- Ameiva wetmorei — Stejneger, 1913; Ameiva wetmorei eleanorae — Grant & C. Roosevelt, 1932; Ameiva eleanorae — Grant, 1932; Ameiva wetmorei — Schwartz & Henderson, 1991; Pholidoscelis wetmorei — Goicoechea et al., 2016

= Pholidoscelis wetmorei =

Species of reptile

Pholidoscelis wetmorei is a species of lizard in the family Teiidae (whiptails). The species is endemic to Puerto Rico. Its common names include the Puerto Rican blue-tailed ameiva, Wetmore's ameiva, blue-tailed ground lizard, and siguana de rabo azul.

== Etymology ==
The specific name, wetmorei, is in honor of American ornithologist Alexander Wetmore.

== Geographic range and habitat ==
In Puerto Rico P. wetmorei occurs in the southwestern dry coastal forests and adjacent islets including Caja de Muertos and Isla Magueyes.

== Similar species ==
P. wetmorei can be distinguished from P. exsul (Puerto Rican ground lizard), found throughout the Puerto Rican Bank, by its much smaller size. It is more abundant and outcompetes P. exsul in the dry forest where their ranges overlap. Juvenile Puerto Rican ground lizards have a similar bright blue tail that is lost with age; the blue tail remains in both adult and juvenile blue-tailed ground lizards.

== Description ==
The blue-tailed ground lizard is a moderately sized lizard, with a maximum snout-to-vent length (SVL) of 52.4 mm (2.06 in) for males and 49.9 mm (1.96 in) SVL for females. It is black overall with a creamy white to coppery red stomach. There are 7–9 tan or brown stripes extending from the head to the tail. The tail is one of the most distinctive traits of P. wetmorei. It is a bright turquoise blue or green, the color fully encircling the tail.

== Biology ==
The blue-tailed ground lizard is xerophilic and diurnal. It is commonly found under rocks and logs, being most active during the heat of the day. The female can carry up to three eggs, and lay at least two clutches of one egg each per year. Ground lizards forage for insects and small fruits.

== Threats ==
The principal threats to the blue-tailed ground lizard are predation and habitat loss. The species only occurs across the dry forests of southwestern Puerto Rico; accordingly, this habitat specialist requires very hot and dry climates to metabolize food and remain active throughout the day. Introduced mammals including small cats and mongooses affect this animal's populations.
