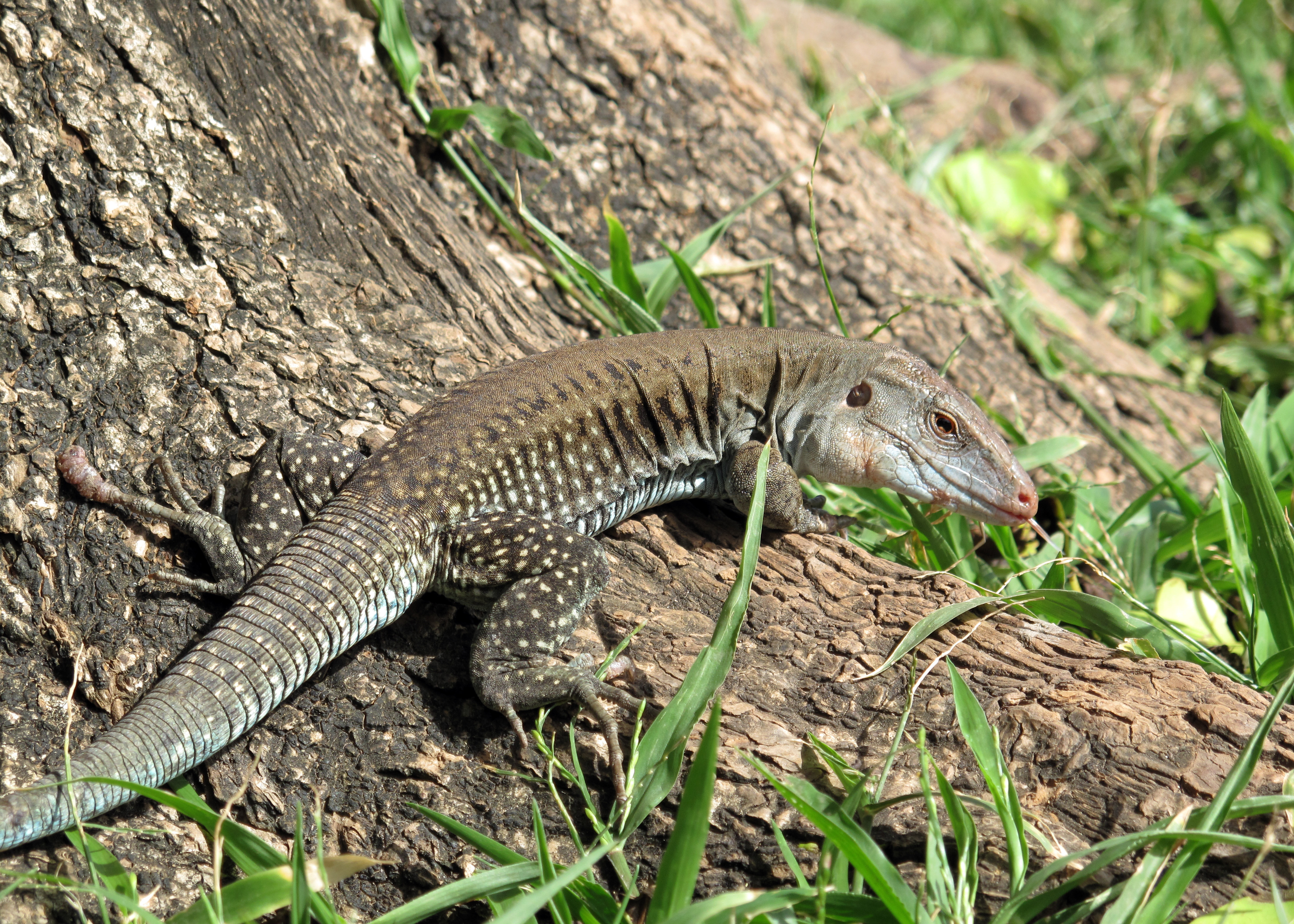

Conservation status
- Least Concern (IUCN 3.1)

Scientific classification
- Kingdom: Animalia
- Phylum: Chordata
- Class: Reptilia
- Order: Squamata
- Family: Teiidae
- Genus: Pholidoscelis
- Species: P. exsul

Binomial name
- Pholidoscelis exsul (Cope, 1862)

Synonyms
- Ameiva plei var. exsul — Cope, 1862; Ameiva exsul — Carey, 1972; Pholidoscelis exsul — Goicoechea et al., 2016

= Common Puerto Rican ameiva =

Species of reptile

The common Puerto Rican ameiva, Puerto Rican ground lizard, or siguana común (Pholidoscelis exsul) is a species of lizard in the whiptail family.

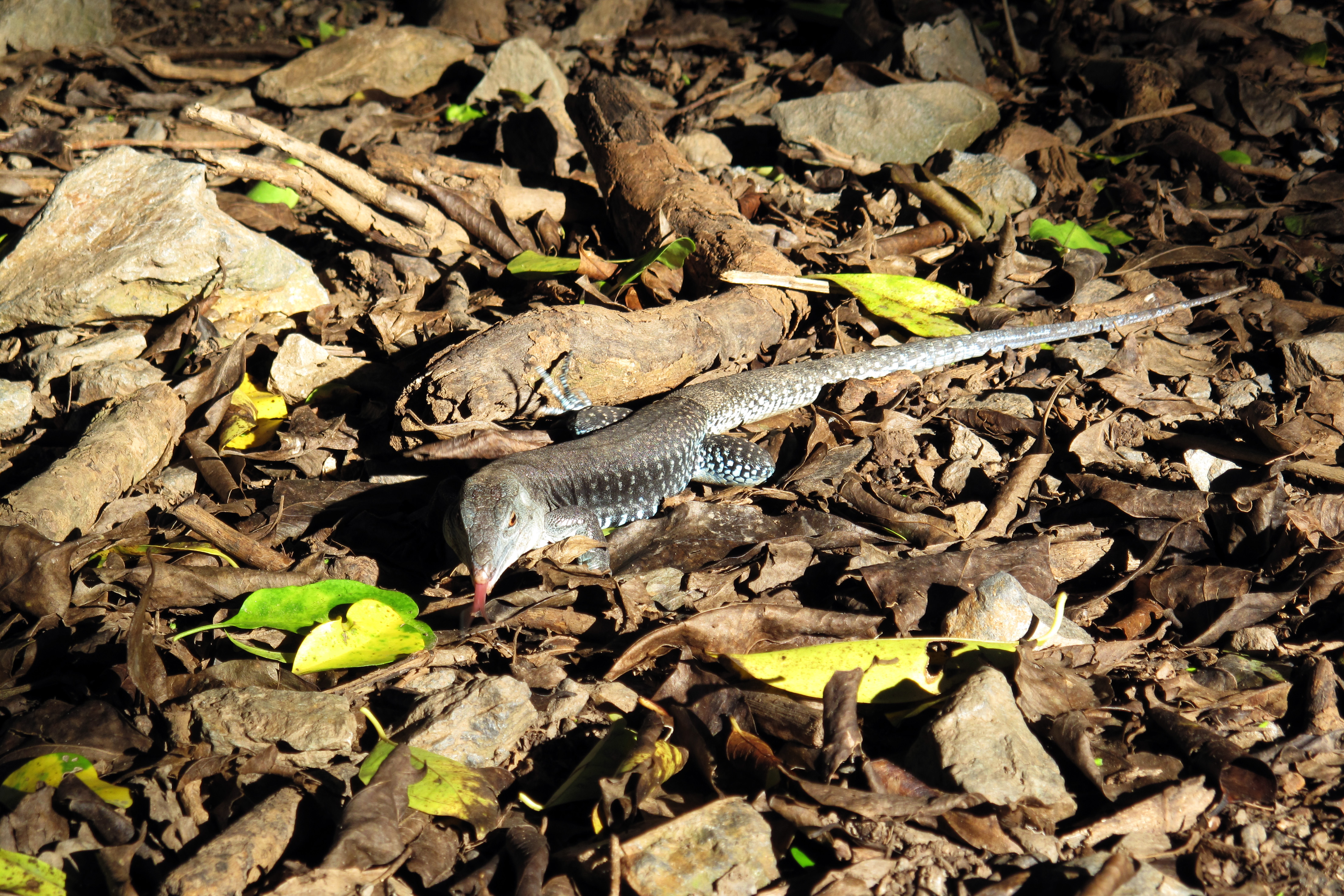
Pholidoscelis exsul on leaf litter.

== Geographic range ==
Ameiva exsul is found in coastal habitats of Puerto Rico, the United States Virgin Islands, and the British Virgin Islands. In Puerto Rico, the species is also found on the island of Isla Culebra, as well as in the Toro Negro State Forest.

== Description ==
Pholidoscelis exsul is a relatively large lizard; males can grow up to 85 cm (33 in). The maximum recorded male snout-to-vent length (SVL) is 201 mm (7.9 in), and the maximum recorded female SVL is 99 mm (3.9 in).

Color patterns vary widely among individuals, populations, and islands. Animals are predominantly colored gray, black, or brown, with large or small white dots along their backs. Dorsolateral stripes vary in number, length, and color. All individuals have a white or blue-white mottled stomach. The chin shield and throat patch are often light pink. Juveniles generally have a bright blue tail and more dots than stripes.

== Biology ==
Puerto Rican ground lizards occur in habitat with open canopy structure and loose sandy soil in elevations between sea-level and 600 m (2,000 ft) where the temperature is above 24 °C (75 °F) year-round. Ground lizards forage for insects and small fruits and scavenge for dead animals or trash scraps in urban areas.

== Reproduction ==
Sexually mature females of P. exsul bury 2–7 pink eggs approximately 100 mm (3.9 in) below ground in loose soil in June–August. Juveniles may have a bright blue tail, like the closely related Pholidoscelis wetmorei (blue-tailed ground lizard), but they will lose the bright blue color in their tail with age. Individuals can live more than six years.

== Threats ==
The main threat to P. exsul individuals is from other animals which eat ground lizards. Mammalian predators, all invasive species, include feral cats, dogs, and small Indian mongooses. Avian predators include American kestrels, Greater Antillean grackles, and pearly-eyed thrashers.
