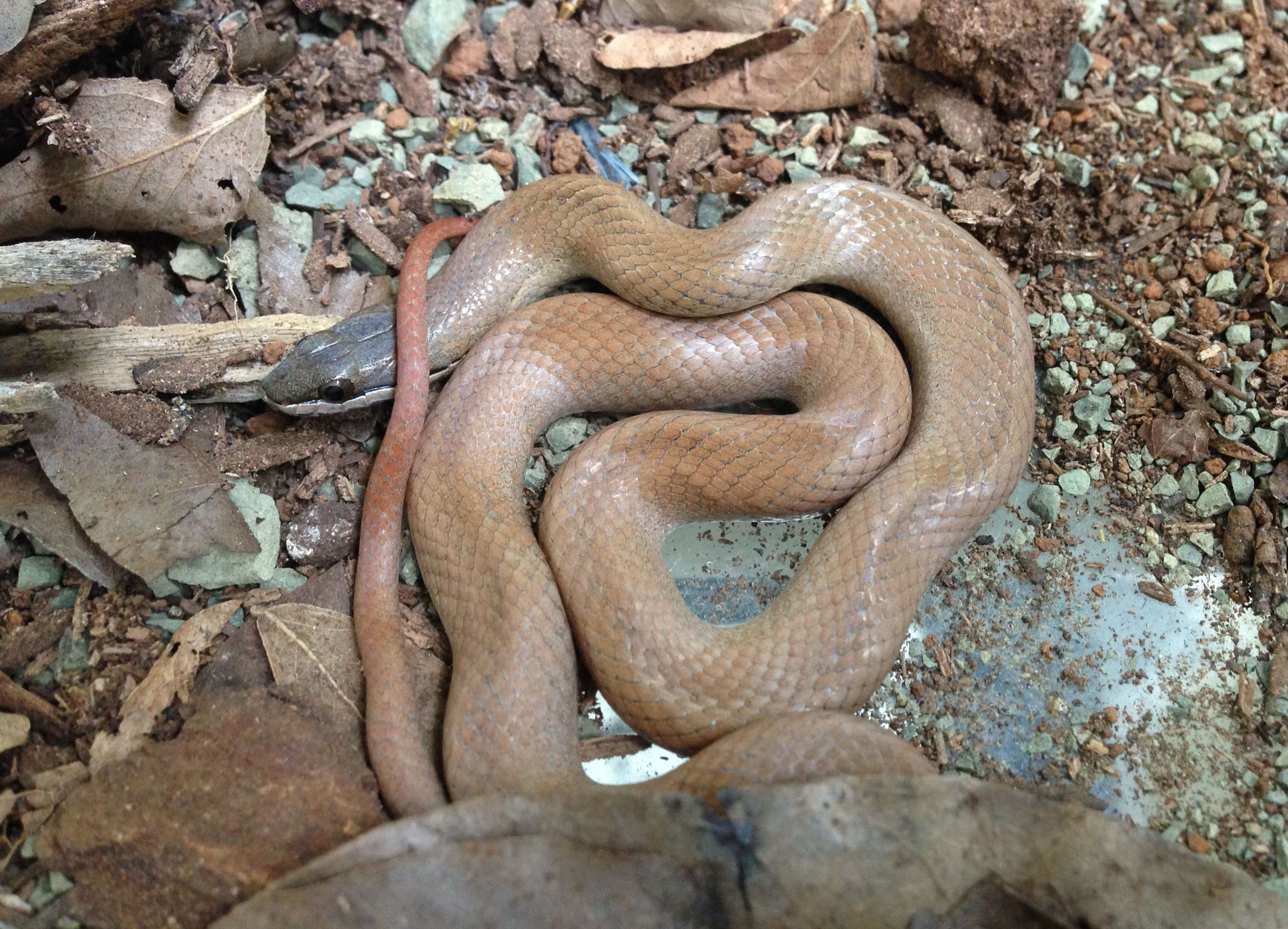
- Ialtris agyrtes

Scientific classification
- Kingdom: Animalia
- Phylum: Chordata
- Class: Reptilia
- Order: Squamata
- Suborder: Serpentes
- Family: Colubridae
- Subfamily: Dipsadinae
- Genus: Ialtris; Cope, 1862

Synonyms
- Darlingtonia Cochran, 1935

= Ialtris =

Genus of snakes

Ialtris is a genus of snakes in the subfamily Dipsadinae of the family Colubridae. The genus is endemic to the island of Hispaniola.

== Geographic range ==
Species of the genus Ialtris are found in the Dominican Republic and Haiti.

== Species and subspecies ==
The genus Ialtris contains the following four species which are recognized as being valid. One of these species, I. haetianus, has three recognized subspecies, including the nominotypical subspecies.

- Ialtris agyrtes Schwartz & Rossman, 1976 – Barahona red-headed racer, Barreras fanged snake
- Ialtris dorsalis (Günther, 1858) – brown fanged snake, Hispaniolan w-headed racer
- Ialtris haetianus (Cochran, 1935) – Haitian ground snake, Hispaniolan upland racer
  - Ialtris haetianus haetianus (Cochran, 1935)
  - Ialtris haetianus perfector (Schwartz & Thomas, 1965)
  - Ialtris haetianus vaticinata (Schwartz, 1970)
- Ialtris parishi Cochran, 1932 – Parish's fanged snake, Tiburon banded racer

Nota bene: A binomial authority or trinomial authority in parentheses indicates that the species or subspecies, respectively, was originally described in a genus other than Ialtris.
