= Jamaican ameiva =

Conservation status
- Endangered (IUCN 3.1)

Scientific classification
- Domain: Eukaryota
- Kingdom: Animalia
- Phylum: Chordata
- Class: Reptilia
- Order: Squamata
- Family: Teiidae
- Genus: Pholidoscelis
- Species: P. dorsalis

Binomial name
- Pholidoscelis dorsalis (Gray, 1838)

Synonyms
- Ameiva dorsalis Gray, 1838

Species of lizard

The Jamaican ameiva (Pholidoscelis dorsalis) is a species of lizard found only in Jamaica.

== Taxonomy ==
The Jamaican ameiva was described in 1838 as Ameiva dorsalis. In 2016, the species was moved to Pholidoscelis based on genetic sequencing and phylogenetic analyses.

== Biology ==
The Jamaican ameiva is a diurnal lizard with an omnivorous diet, including members of its species. It is found in mesic to dry habitats near the sea, in gardens and vegetated duneland, associated with Coccoloba and Ipomea plant species.

== Conservation ==
The Jamaican ameiva historically occurred throughout the lowlands of Jamaica and its cays in scattered subpopulations, though 7 of the 10 mainland subpopulations are considered possibly extinct. It persists on at least 4 cays offshore of the mainland. It is considered an endangered species on the IUCN Red List.
