= Ialtris parishi =

Conservation status
- Critically Endangered (IUCN 3.1)

Scientific classification
- Kingdom: Animalia
- Phylum: Chordata
- Class: Reptilia
- Order: Squamata
- Suborder: Serpentes
- Family: Colubridae
- Genus: Ialtris
- Species: I. parishi

Binomial name
- Ialtris parishi Cochran, 1932

Synonyms
- Alsophis parishi (Cochran, 1932)

Species of snake

Ialtris parishi, also known commonly as Parish's fanged snake and the Tiburon banded racer, is a species of snake in the subfamily Dipsadinae of the family Colubridae. The species is native to Haiti.

== Etymology ==
The specific name, parishi, is in honor of Lee H. Parish (died 1931) who was a member of the expedition which collected the holotype.

== Habitat ==
The preferred natural habitat of Ialtris parishi is forest, at elevations of 13–243 m (43–797 ft).

== Behavior ==
Ialtris parishi is terrestrial (ground-dwelling).

== Reproduction ==
Ialtris parishi is oviparous.
