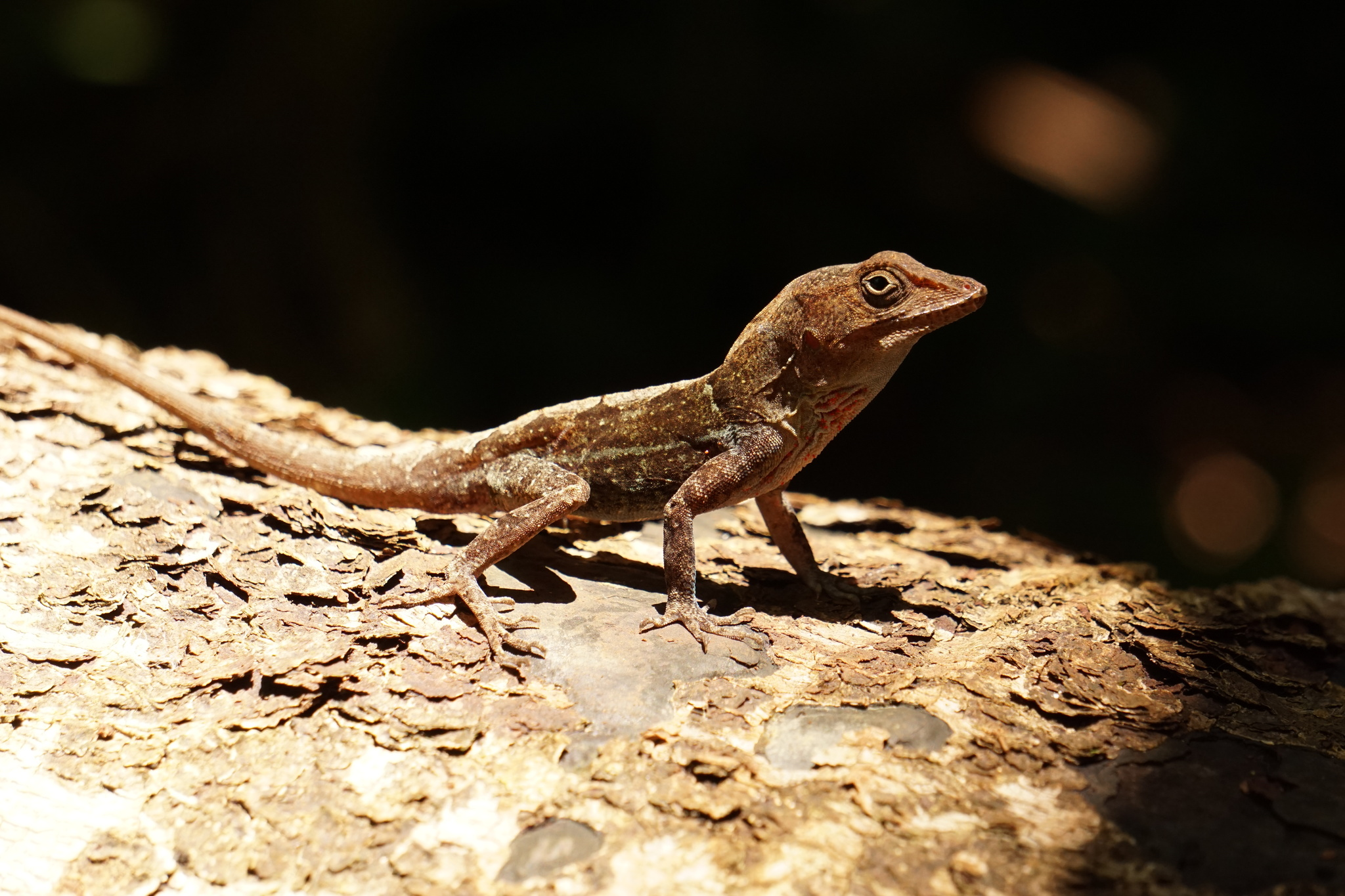

Scientific classification
- Kingdom: Animalia
- Phylum: Chordata
- Class: Reptilia
- Order: Squamata
- Suborder: Iguania
- Family: Dactyloidae
- Genus: Anolis
- Species: A. aridius

Binomial name
- Anolis aridius (Köhler, Zimmer, McGrath, & Hedges, 2019)

Synonyms
- Audantia aridius Köhler et al., 2019

= Anolis aridius =

Species of lizard

Anolis aridius, the desert stout anole, is a species of lizard in the family Dactyloidae. Males grow to 70 mm (2.8 in) and females to 53 mm (2.1 in) in snout–vent length. Males have dirty-white dewlaps with a yellow or orange hue and regularly-arranged gorgetals, smaller in size towards the center of the dewlap. It is endemic to the Dominican Republic, where it inhabits degraded broadleaf forests at elevations of up to 1,340 m (4,400 ft) in the eastern Barahona Peninsula.

== Taxonomy ==
Anolis aridius was formally described in 2019 as Audantia aridius based on a specimen from Cortico in the Barahona Province of the Dominican Republic. The specific epithet is derived from the Latin word for "dry", referring to the species' preference for dry habitats. It has the common name desert stout anole.

Specimens of Anolis aridius were historically considered to represent Anolis cybotes. A. aridius is most closely related to a clade formed by A. cybotes and A. australis. The extremely large genus Anolis is sometimes split into several smaller genera; under this arrangement, Anolis aridius is placed in the genus Audantia, a group of more than a dozen species endemic to Hispaniola.

== Description ==
Males of the species grow to a snout–vent length of 70 mm (2.8 in) and females to 53 mm (2.1 in). Males have dirty-white dewlaps with a yellow or orange hue and regularly-arranged gorgetals, smaller in size towards the center of the dewlap. There are no dark stripes on the throat.

== Distribution and ecology ==
Anolis aridius is endemic to the Dominican Republic, a Caribbean country that occupies the eastern portion of the island of Hispaniola, which it shares with Haiti. A. aridius is only found in the eastern portion of the Barahona Peninsula. The anole has been recorded from degraded broadleaf forests at elevations of up to 1,340 m (4,400 ft). These anoles can be seen hiding below rocks and perched on stones and plants during the day, as well as sleeping on vegetation at night.

Anolis aridius has not been evaluated by the IUCN, but the authors who described the species recommended it be classified as being of least concern due to its sufficiently large range and tolerance of disturbed habitat.
