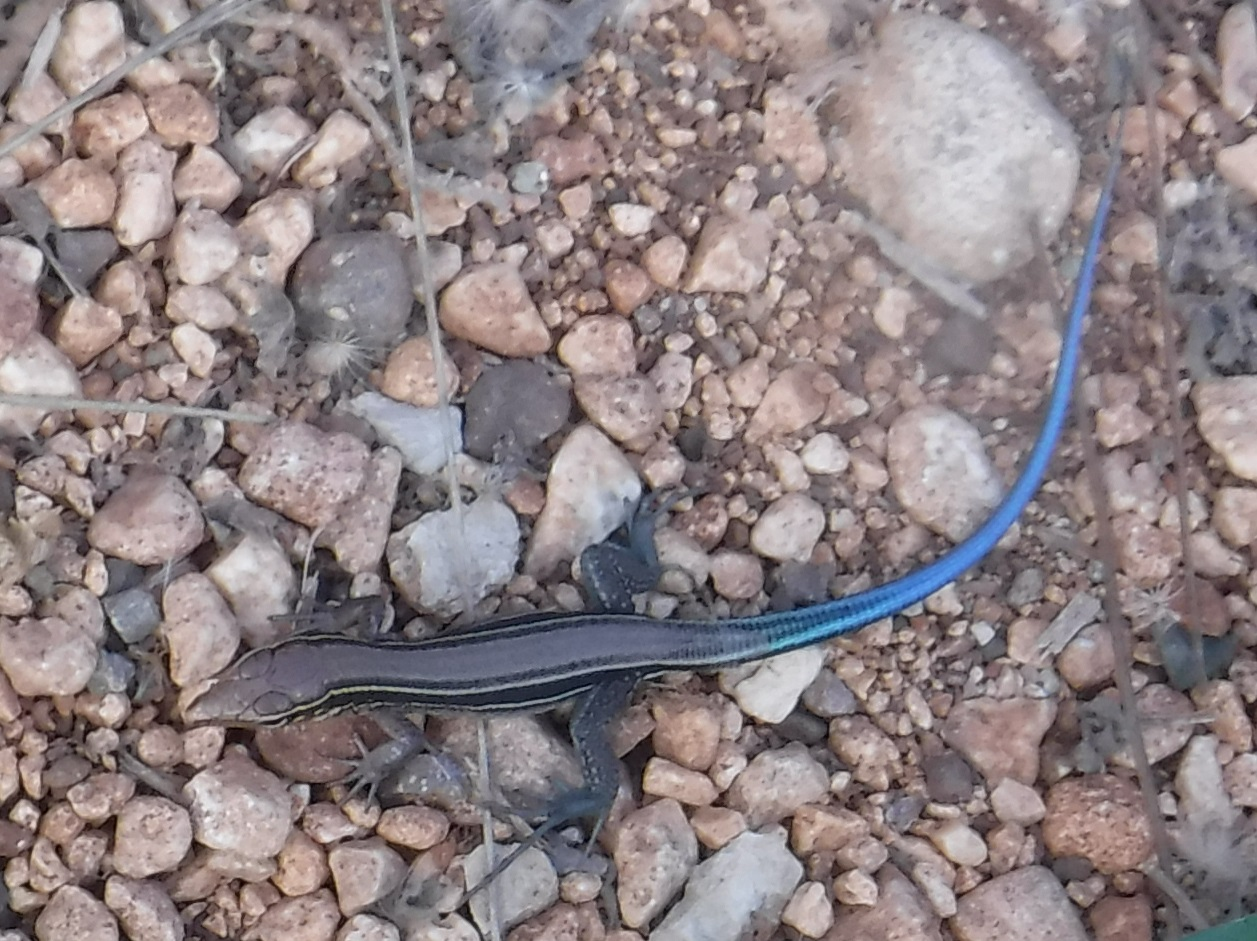
- in Haiti on the Tiburon peninsula

Conservation status
- Least Concern (IUCN 3.1)

Scientific classification
- Kingdom: Animalia
- Phylum: Chordata
- Class: Reptilia
- Order: Squamata
- Suborder: Lacertoidea
- Family: Teiidae
- Genus: Pholidoscelis
- Species: P. taeniurus

Binomial name
- Pholidoscelis taeniurus Cope, 1862

= Pholidoscelis taeniurus =

Species of lizard

Pholidoscelis taeniurus, the Hispaniolan blue-tailed ameiva or Haitian ameiva, is a member of the Teiidae family of lizards. It is endemic to the island of Hispaniola (Haiti and the Dominican Republic), including some satellite islands, like Île-à-Vache, Gonâve Island, and Isla Saona.
