= Anolis longitibialis =

Conservation status
- Endangered (IUCN 3.1)

Scientific classification
- Kingdom: Animalia
- Phylum: Chordata
- Class: Reptilia
- Order: Squamata
- Suborder: Iguania
- Family: Dactyloidae
- Genus: Anolis
- Species: A. longitibialis

Binomial name
- Anolis longitibialis Noble, 1923

Species of lizard

Anolis longitibialis, the Barahona stout anole or Isla Beata anole, is a species of lizard in the family Dactyloidae. The species is found in the Dominican Republic.
