= Anolis semilineatus =

Conservation status
- Least Concern (IUCN 3.1)

Scientific classification
- Kingdom: Animalia
- Phylum: Chordata
- Class: Reptilia
- Order: Squamata
- Suborder: Iguania
- Family: Dactyloidae
- Genus: Anolis
- Species: A. semilineatus

Binomial name
- Anolis semilineatus Cope, 1864

Species of lizard

Anolis semilineatus, the Hispaniolan grass anole, Santo Domingo anole, or half-lined Hispaniolan grass anole, is a species of lizard in the family Dactyloidae. The species is found in Haiti and the Dominican Republic.
