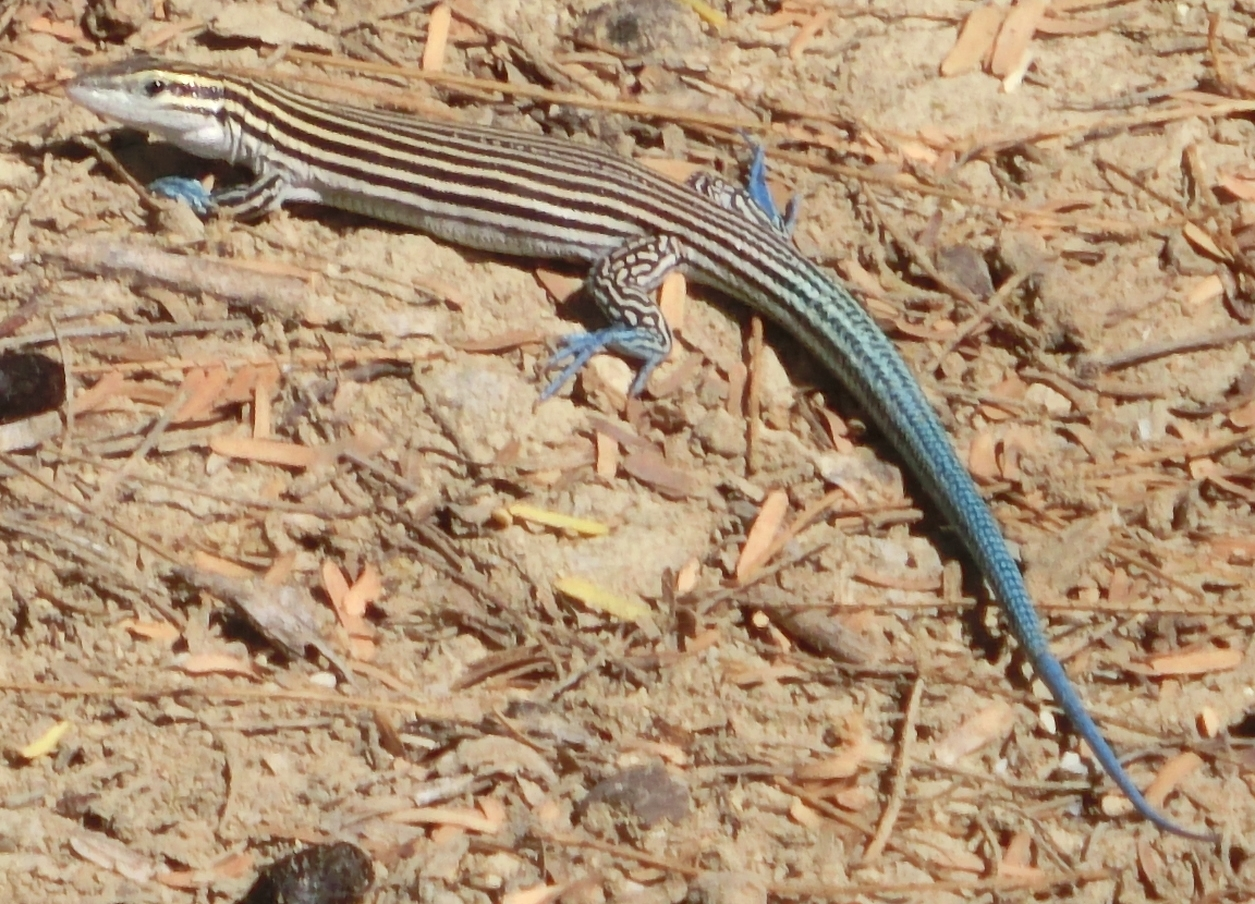

Conservation status
- Least Concern (IUCN 3.1)

Scientific classification
- Domain: Eukaryota
- Kingdom: Animalia
- Phylum: Chordata
- Class: Reptilia
- Order: Squamata
- Family: Teiidae
- Genus: Pholidoscelis
- Species: P. lineolatus

Binomial name
- Pholidoscelis lineolatus (Duméril & Bibron, 1839)

= Pigmy blue-tailed ameiva =

Species of lizard

The pigmy blue-tailed ameiva (Pholidoscelis lineolatus) is a species of lizard endemic to Hispaniola.
