= Ialtris haetianus =

Conservation status
- Vulnerable (IUCN 3.1)

Scientific classification
- Kingdom: Animalia
- Phylum: Chordata
- Class: Reptilia
- Order: Squamata
- Suborder: Serpentes
- Family: Colubridae
- Genus: Ialtris
- Species: I. haetianus

Binomial name
- Ialtris haetianus (Cochran, 1935)

Species of snake

Ialtris haetianus, the Hispaniolan upland racer or Haitian ground snake, is a species of snake in the family Colubridae. The species is native to Haiti and the Dominican Republic.
