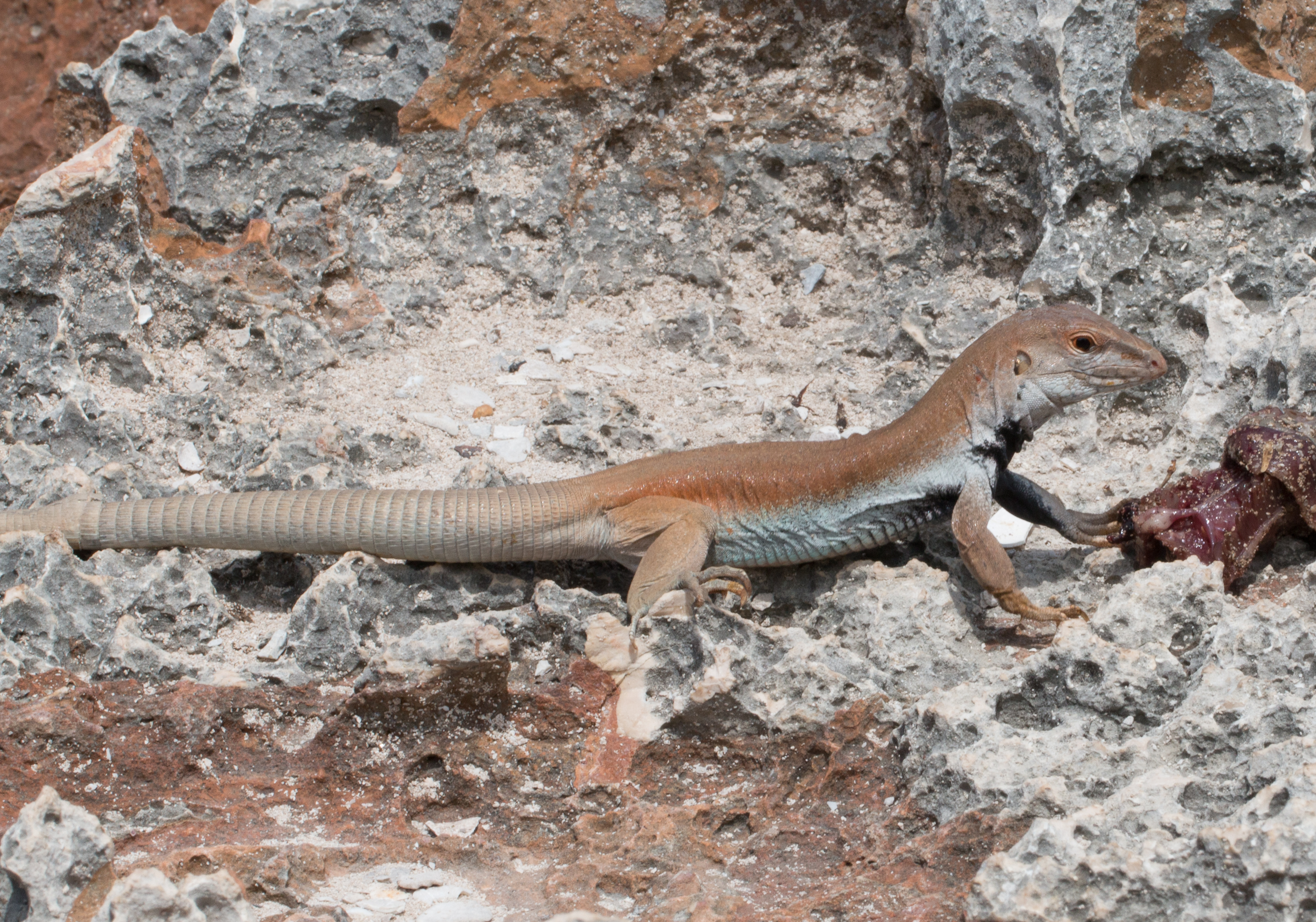

Conservation status
- Least Concern (IUCN 3.1)

Scientific classification
- Kingdom: Animalia
- Phylum: Chordata
- Class: Reptilia
- Order: Squamata
- Suborder: Lacertoidea
- Family: Teiidae
- Subfamily: Teiinae
- Genus: Pholidoscelis
- Species: P. chrysolaemus

Binomial name
- Pholidoscelis chrysolaemus (Cope, 1868)

Subspecies
- 16, see text.

Synonyms
- Cnemidophorus affinis Ameiva regularis Ameiva chrysolaema Ameiva leberi

= Common ameiva =

Species of lizard

The common ameiva (Pholidoscelis chrysolaemus) is a species of lizard endemic to Hispaniola and a number of smaller associated islands. It is known to engage in homosexual mating among males.

== Taxonomy ==
The common ameiva was originally described by Edward Drinker Cope in 1868, as Ameiva chrysolaema. The specific epithet likely comes from the Greek chryso, meaning gold, and laimos, meaning neck or throat, for the yellow throat and belly of this species. In 2016, the species was moved to Pholidoscelis based on genetic sequencing and phylogenetic analyses.

=== Subspecies ===
There are sixteen accepted subspecies in The Reptile Database. Given the variation among the subspecies, some authors suggest that they probably comprise more than one species.

- Pholidoscelis chrysolaemus chrysolaemus (Cope 1868)
- Pholidoscelis chrysolaemus abbotti (Noble 1923)
- Pholidoscelis chrysolaemus alacris (Schwartz & Klinikowski 1966)
- Pholidoscelis chrysolaemus boekeri (Mertens 1939)
- Pholidoscelis chrysolaemus defensor (Schwartz & Klinikowski 1966)
- Pholidoscelis chrysolaemus evulsus (Schwartz 1973)
- Pholidoscelis chrysolaemus fictus (Schwartz & Klinikowski 1966)
- Pholidoscelis chrysolaemus jactus (Schwartz & Klinikowski 1966)
- Pholidoscelis chrysolaemus parvoris (Schwartz & Klinikowski 1966)
- Pholidoscelis chrysolaemus procax (Schwartz & Klinikowski 1966)
- Pholidoscelis chrysolaemus quadrijugis (Schwartz 1968)
- Pholidoscelis chrysolaemus regularis (Fischer 1888)
- Pholidoscelis chrysolaemus richardthomasi (Schwartz & Klinikowski 1966)
- Pholidoscelis chrysolaemus secessus (Schwartz & Klinikowski 1966)
- Pholidoscelis chrysolaemus umbratilis (Schwartz & Klinikowski 1966)
- Pholidoscelis chrysolaemus woodi (Cochran 1934)

== Conservation ==
The common ameiva is considered a species of least concern by the IUCN Red List due to its broad distribution and adaptable nature to modified environments and impacts, such as habitat destruction and urban development. Some subpopulations, such as in Santo Domingo, appear to be in decline due to the loss of backyards and predation by cats.
