= La Gran Sabana National Park =

National park in the Dominican Republic

- IUCN category II (national park)
- Location within the Dominican Republic
- Interactive map of La Gran Sabana National Park
- Location: Independencia Province, Dominican Republic
- Coordinates: 18°24′N 71°23′W
- Area: 219.58 km^{2} (84.78 sq mi)
- Designation: National Park
- Designated: 2009

La Gran Sabana National Park is a protected area in the Dominican Republic. It lies east of Lake Enriquillo in the Hoya de Enriquillo lowland. It was established in 2009, and has an area of 219.58 km^{2}.
