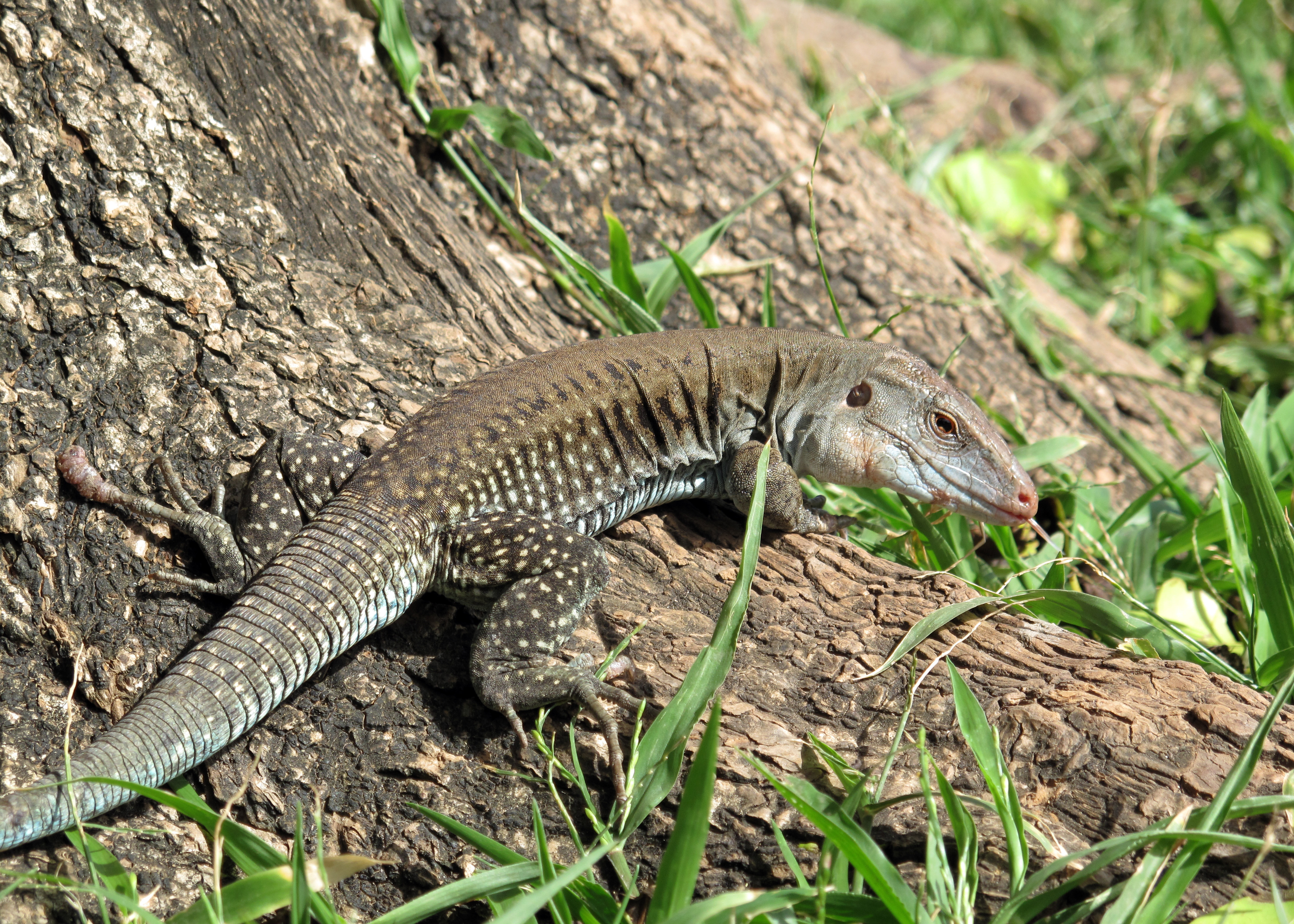
- Common Puerto Rican ameiva (Pholidoscelis exsul)

Scientific classification
- Kingdom: Animalia
- Phylum: Chordata
- Class: Reptilia
- Order: Squamata
- Family: Teiidae
- Subfamily: Teiinae
- Genus: Pholidoscelis; Fitzinger, 1843

= Pholidoscelis =

Genus of lizards

Pholidoscelis is a genus of lizards that belongs to the family Teiidae. All species are endemic to the West Indies.

== Classification ==
Listed alphabetically.

- Pholidoscelis alboguttatus (Boulenger, 1896) – Mona ground lizard, Mona ameiva
- Pholidoscelis atratus (Garman, 1887) – Redonda ameiva
- Pholidoscelis auberi (Cocteau, 1838) – Auber's ameiva, Cuban ameiva
- Pholidoscelis chrysolaemus (Cope, 1868) – common ameiva, Hispaniolan giant ameiva
- †Pholidoscelis cineraceus (Barbour & Noble, 1915) – Guadeloupe ameiva (extinct)
- Pholidoscelis corax (Censky & Paulson, 1992) – Censky's ameiva, Anguilla black ameiva, Little Scrub Island ground lizard
- Pholidoscelis corvinus (Cope, 1861) – Sombrero ameiva
- Pholidoscelis desechensis (Heatwole & Torres, 1967) – Desecheo ground lizard
- Pholidoscelis dorsalis (Gray, 1838) – Jamaica ameiva
- Pholidoscelis erythrocephalus (Daudin, 1802) – St. Christopher ameiva
- Pholidoscelis exsul (Cope, 1862) – common Puerto Rican ameiva
- Pholidoscelis fuscatus (Garman, 1887) – Dominican ameiva
- Pholidoscelis griswoldi (Barbour, 1916) – Antiguan ameiva, Griswold's ameiva
- Pholidoscelis lineolatus (A.M.C. Duméril & Bibron, 1839) – Pigmy blue-tailed ameiva, dwarf teiid
- †Pholidoscelis major (A.M.C. Duméril & Bibron, 1839) – Martinique ameiva, Martinique giant ameiva
- Pholidoscelis maynardi (Garman, 1888) – Great Inagua ameiva
- Pholidoscelis plei (A.M.C. Duméril & Bibron, 1839) – Anguilla Bank ameiva
- Pholidoscelis pluvianotatus (Garman, 1887) – Montserrat ameiva
- Pholidoscelis polops (Cope, 1862) – St. Croix ameiva, St. Croix ground lizard
- Pholidoscelis taeniurus (Cope, 1862) – Hispaniolan blue-tailed ameiva, Haitian ameiva
- Pholidoscelis wetmorei (Stejneger, 1913) – Puerto Rican blue-tailed ameiva, Wetmore's ameiva

Nota bene: A binomial authority in parentheses indicates that the species was originally described in a genus other than Pholidiscelis.
