= Anolis olssoni =

Conservation status
- Least Concern (IUCN 3.1)

Scientific classification
- Kingdom: Animalia
- Phylum: Chordata
- Class: Reptilia
- Order: Squamata
- Suborder: Iguania
- Family: Dactyloidae
- Genus: Anolis
- Species: A. olssoni

Binomial name
- Anolis olssoni Schmidt, 1919

Species of lizard

Anolis olssoni, also known commonly as the desert grass anole, the Monte Cristi anole, and Olsson's anole, is a species of lizard in the family Dactyloidae. The species is endemic to the island of Hispaniola. There are eight recognized subspecies.

== Etymology ==
The specific name, olssoni, is in honor of American paleontologist Axel Adolph Olsson.

== Geographic distribution ==
Anoli olssoni is found in the Dominican Republic and Haiti.

== Habitat ==
Anolis olssoni is found in a wide variety of natural habitats, including desert, grassland, shrubland, and forest, at elevations from sea level to 700 m (2,300 ft), and also in disturbed habitats such as rural gardens.

== Behavior ==
Anolis olssoni is terrestrial.

== Diet ==
Anolis olssoni is omnivorous, preying upon arthropods, and eating plant material.

== Subspecies ==
Eight subspecies are recognized as being valid, including the nominotypical subspecies.

- Anolis olssoni alienus Schwartz, 1981
- Anolis olssoni domingonis Schwartz, 1981
- Anolis olssoni extentus Schwartz, 1981
- Anolis olssoni ferrugicauda Schwartz, 1981
- Anolis olssoni insulanus Schwartz, 1981
- Anolis olssoni montivagus Schwartz, 1981
- Anolis olssoni olssoni Schmidt, 1919
- Anolis olssoni palloris Schwartz, 1981
