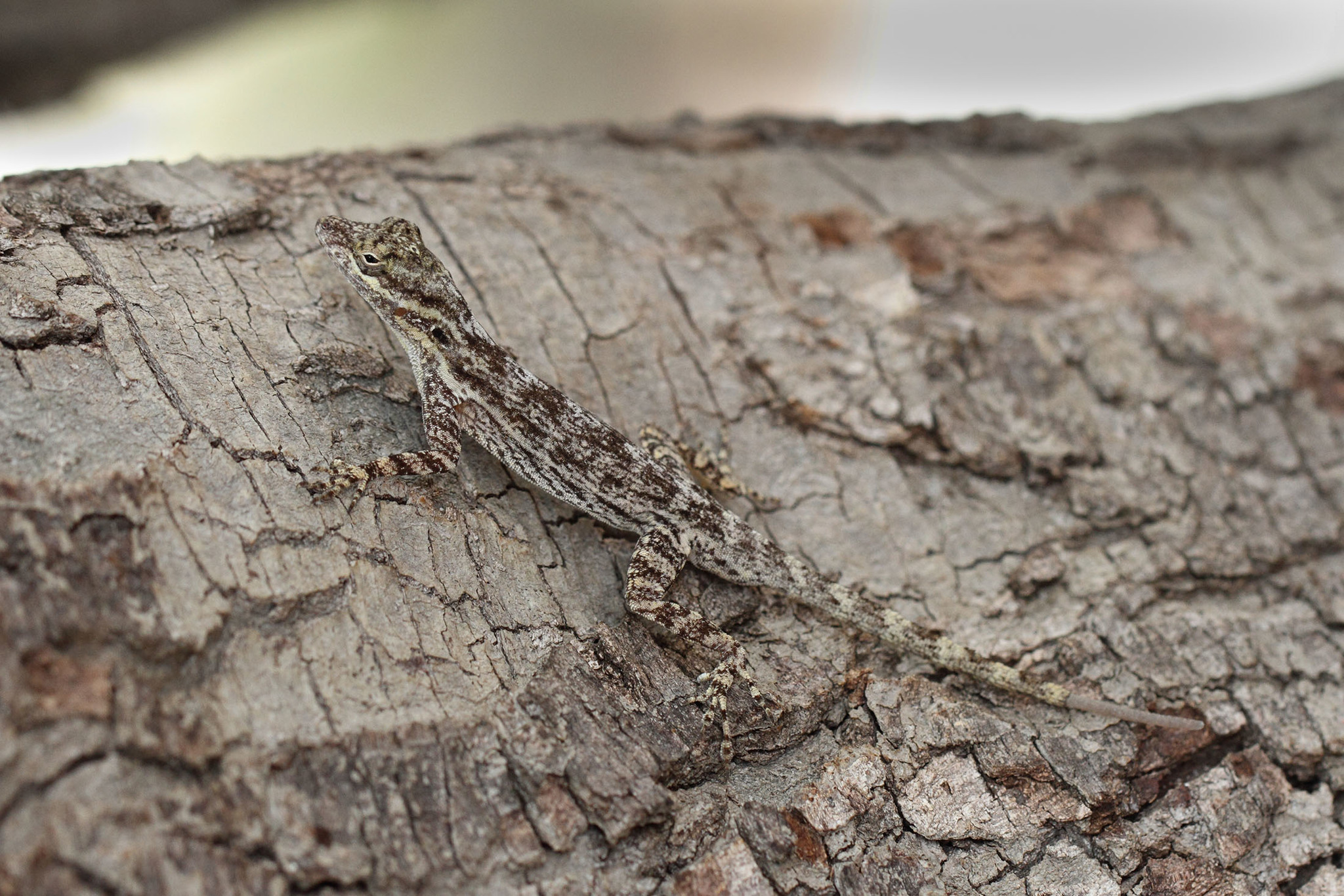

Conservation status
- Least Concern (IUCN 3.1)

Scientific classification
- Kingdom: Animalia
- Phylum: Chordata
- Class: Reptilia
- Order: Squamata
- Suborder: Iguania
- Family: Dactyloidae
- Genus: Anolis
- Species: A. brevirostris

Binomial name
- Anolis brevirostris Bocourt, 1870

= Anolis brevirostris =

Species of lizard

Anolis brevirostris, the desert gracile anole or shortnose anole, is a species of lizard in the family Dactyloidae. The species is found in Hispaniola.
