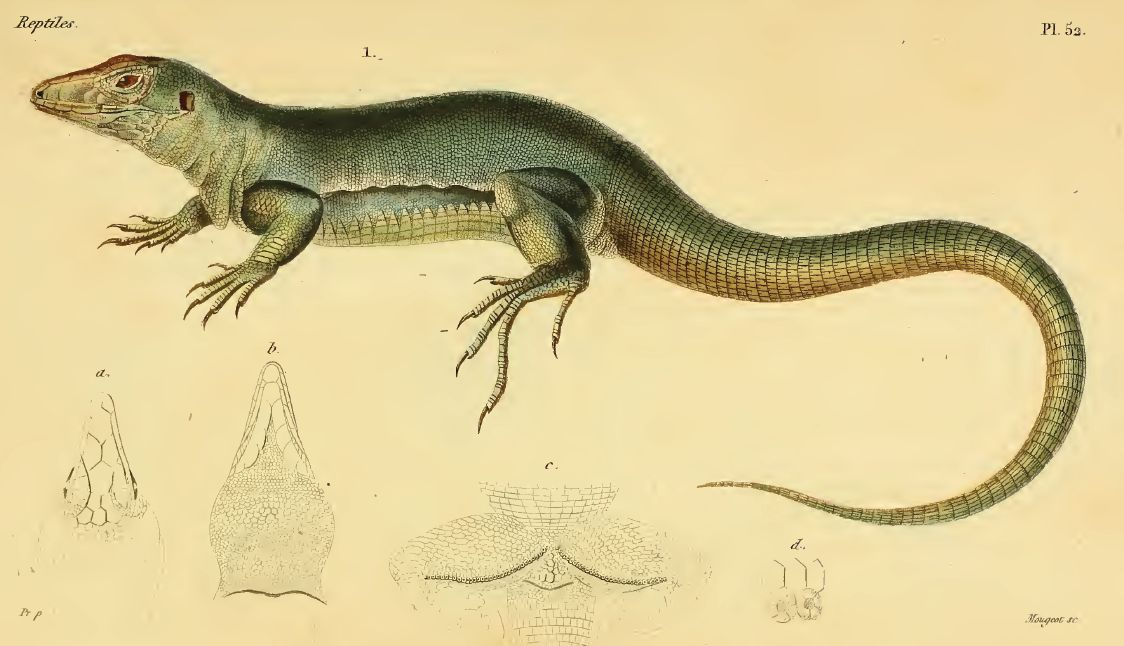

Conservation status
- Data Deficient (IUCN 3.1)

Scientific classification
- Kingdom: Animalia
- Phylum: Chordata
- Class: Reptilia
- Order: Squamata
- Family: Teiidae
- Genus: Pholidoscelis
- Species: †P. major

Binomial name
- †Pholidoscelis major Duméril & Bibron, 1839
- Location of Martinique

Synonyms
- Ameiva major

= Martinique giant ameiva =

Extinct species of lizard

The Martinique giant ameiva (Pholidoscelis major) was a species of lizard in the family Teiidae. It is believed to have been endemic to Martinique, though at least one scholar disputes this, instead placing it on Les Iles de la Petite Terre within the Guadeloupean archipelago. It is known only from museum specimens collected by early European explorers. Its extinction may have been caused by a hurricane, or through the introduction of predatory species to the island. The maximum snout-vent length for the species is 242 mm
