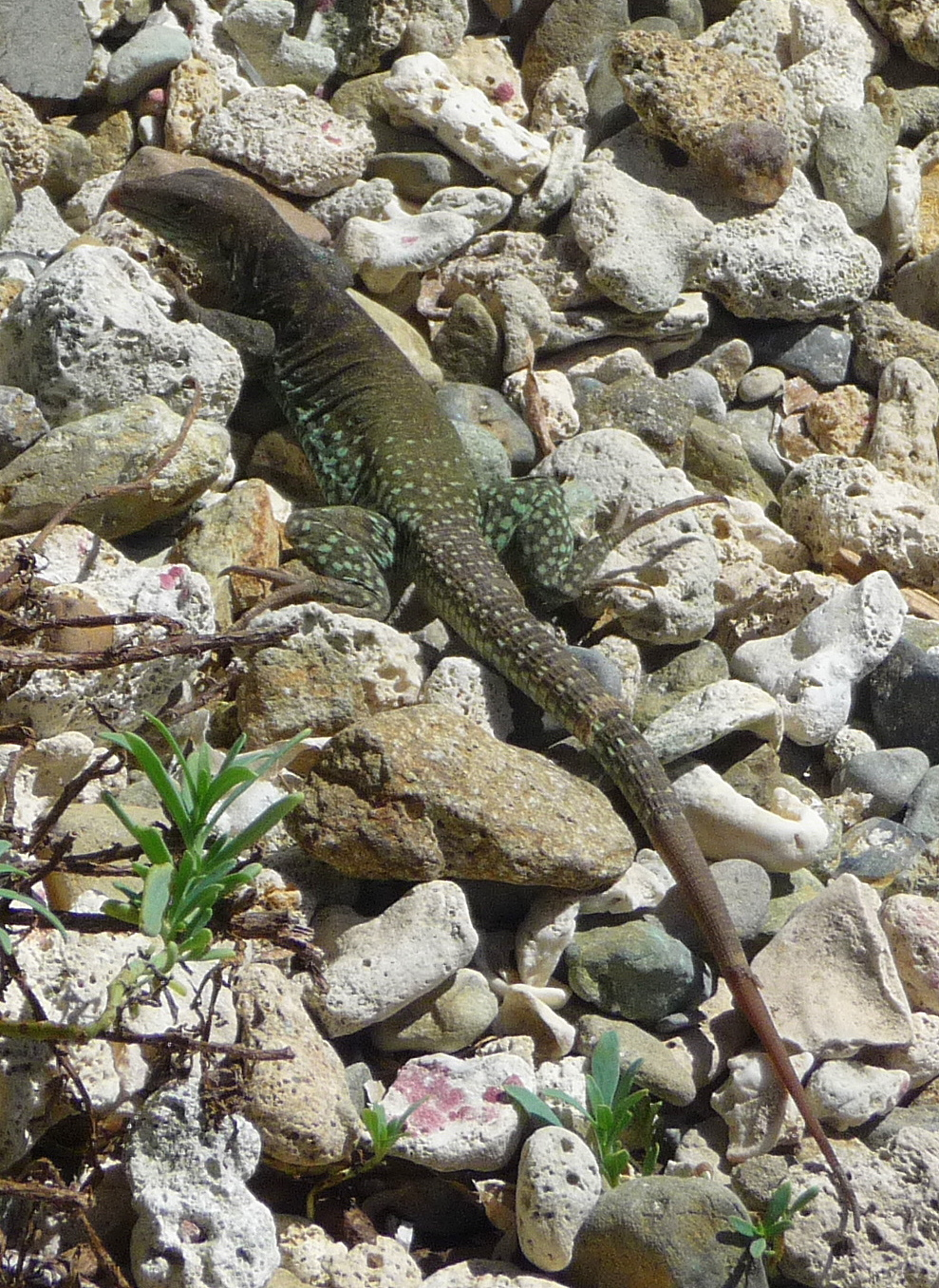
- on Saint Martin

Conservation status
- Least Concern (IUCN 3.1)

Scientific classification
- Kingdom: Animalia
- Phylum: Chordata
- Class: Reptilia
- Order: Squamata
- Family: Teiidae
- Genus: Pholidoscelis
- Species: P. plei

Binomial name
- Pholidoscelis plei (A.M.C. Duméril & Bibron, 1839)

Subspecies
- P. p. plei (A.M.C. Duméril & Bibron, 1839); P. p. analiferus (Cope, 1870)

Synonyms
- Ameiva plei A.M.C. Duméril & Bibron, 1839; Pholidoscelis plei — Goicoechea et al., 2016

= Pholidoscelis plei =

Species of lizard

Pholidoscelis plei, known commonly as the Anguilla Bank ameiva or the Caribbean ameiva, is a species of lizard in the family Teiidae. The species is found on the Caribbean islands of Anguilla, Saint Martin, and Saint Barthélemy in the Lesser Antilles. Its coloration and markings vary between each island population. Two subspecies are recognized as being valid, including the nominotypical subspecies.

== Etymology ==
The specific name, plei, is in honor of French botanist Auguste Plée.

== Populations ==
=== Anguilla ===
The Anguilla Bank ameiva is found on the main island of Anguilla and most of its satellites, where it is common. Among those populations, adults are gray-brown tinged with green-blue. Adults have white to light green spots on their flanks that can merge towards the posterior to form a barred pattern, with some variability between populations in the distinctiveness or presence of the stripes. Its ventral surface lacks markings and is light blue to white. Juveniles are brown with seven light stripes that are sometimes broken.

Males reach a maximum of 181 mm (7.1 in) snout-to-vent length (SVL), while females reach 139 mm (5.5 in) SVL; however, maximum sizes vary between populations on different islands.

=== Saint Martin ===
The Anguilla Bank ameiva population on the main island of Saint Martin was described as a separate subspecies, P. p. analifera, in 1992. It differs from other populations by having faded stripes, and three to five vertical black bars or bands across the shoulder area in larger individuals. It is restricted to very localized populations on Saint Martin due to predation from the widespread mongoose, which causes it to be absent from many areas in which it would otherwise thrive.

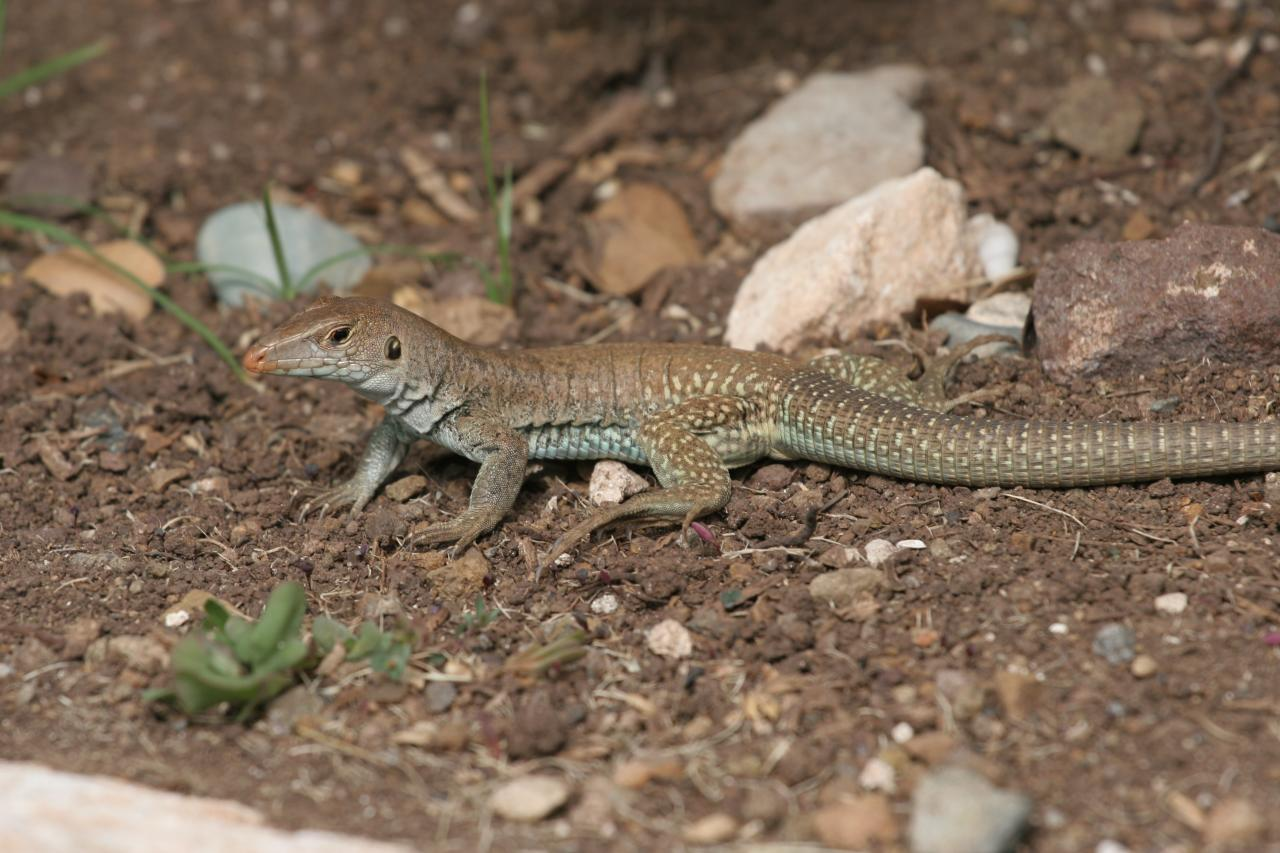
on Saint Martin

=== Saint Barthélemy ===
Populations of Anguilla Bank ameivas on Saint Barthélemy differ considerably in appearance between islands. On the main island, its ground color is green-brown with green-blue sides, and it is heavily spotted with green to cream-colored spots. On Île Fourchue, it is uniformly reddish-brown with little marking on its dorsal side, and spots or bars on its sides.

== Habitat ==
The natural habitats of P. plei are forest and marine intertidal.

== Reproduction ==
P. plei is oviparous.
