= List of amphibians of Hispaniola =

The amphibians of Hispaniola are diverse.

The island of Hispaniola, shared by Haiti and the Dominican Republic, is remarkable for its amphibian diversity - with approximately 99% of species being endemic to the island. Many species are restricted to just one of the two countries, and a significant number are microendemic, meaning they are found only in very specific locations within their respective countries. This list catalogs the amphibian species of Hispaniola, including extant native species, introduced species, and those that may have gone extinct in recent history.

== Amphibians ==
Family Bufonidae:
Species	Common name	Conservation status	Haiti	Dominican Republic
Peltophryne armata	Hispaniolan armored toad	Not assessed		X
Peltophryne fluviatica	Hispaniolan crestless toad	Critically endangered		X
Peltophryne guentheri	Southern Hispaniola crested toad	Vulnerable	X	X
Rhinella marina	Cane toad	Least concern	X	X

Family Eleutherodactylidae:
Species	Common name	Conservation status	Haiti	Dominican Republic
Eleutherodactylus abbotti	Common chirping frog	Least concern	X	X
Eleutherodactylus alcoae	Barahona rockfrog	Endangered	X	X
Eleutherodactylus amadeus	Macaya bushfrog	Critically endangered	X	
Eleutherodactylus aporostegus	Tiburon burrowing frog	Not assessed	X	
Eleutherodactylus apostates	La Hotte big-legged frog	Critically endangered	X	
Eleutherodactylus armstrongi	Baoruco hammer frog	Endangered	X	X
Eleutherodactylus audanti	South Island telegraphic frog	Vulnerable	X	X
Eleutherodactylus auriculatoides	Northern hammer frog	Endangered		X
Eleutherodactylus bakeri	La Hotte bushfrog	Critically endangered	X	
Eleutherodactylus brevirostris	Short-nosed green frog	Critically endangered	X	
Eleutherodactylus caribe	Haitian marshfrog	Critically endangered	X	
Eleutherodactylus chlorophenax	False green robber frog	Critically endangered	X	
Eleutherodactylus corona	Hispaniolan crowned frog	Critically endangered	X	
Eleutherodactylus counouspeus	Yellow cave frog	Endangered	X	
Eleutherodactylus darlingtoni	La Selle long-legged frog	Critically endangered	X	
Eleutherodactylus diplasius	Patternless whistling frog	Endangered	X	
Eleutherodactylus dolomedes	Hispaniolan ventriloquial frog	Critically endangered	X	
Eleutherodactylus eunaster	La Hotte whistling frog	Critically endangered	X	
Eleutherodactylus flavescens	Yellow split-toed frog	Near threatened		X
Eleutherodactylus fowleri	Khaki bromeliad frog	Critically endangered	X	X
Eleutherodactylus furcyensis	La Selle red-legged frog	Critically endangered	X	X
Eleutherodactylus glandulifer	La Hotte glanded frog	Critically endangered	X	
Eleutherodactylus glanduliferoides	La Selle grassfrog	Critically endangered	X	
Eleutherodactylus glaphycompus	Ball bearing frog	Endangered	X	
Eleutherodactylus grahami	Yellow chevronate frog	Endangered	X	
Eleutherodactylus haitianus	Montane cricket frog	Endangered		X
Eleutherodactylus heminota	Half-striped bromeliad frog	Endangered	X	X
Eleutherodactylus hypostenor	Baoruco burrowing frog	Endangered	X	X
Eleutherodactylus inoptatus	Hispaniolan giant frog	Least concern	X	X
Eleutherodactylus jugans	La Selle dusky frog	Critically endangered	X	X
Eleutherodactylus lamprotes	Hispaniolan orange-legged frog	Critically endangered	X	
Eleutherodactylus leoncei	Southern pastel frog	Critically endangered	X	X
Eleutherodactylus ligiae	Baoruco rockfrog	Not assessed		X
Eleutherodactylus limbensis	Haitian streamside frog	Not assessed	X	
Eleutherodactylus lucioi	Pallid rockfrog	Critically endangered	X	
Eleutherodactylus melatrigonum	Cordillera Central telegraphic frog	Not assessed		X
Eleutherodactylus minutus	Hispaniolan wheeping frog	Endangered		X
Eleutherodactylus montanus	Hispaniolan montane frog	Endangered		X
Eleutherodactylus neiba	Neiba leaf-litter frog	Not assessed		X
Eleutherodactylus nortoni	Spiny giant frog	Critically endangered	X	X
Eleutherodactylus notidodes	Neiba telegraphic frog	Endangered		X
Eleutherodactylus oxyrhyncus	Hispaniolan sharp-nosed frog	Critically endangered	X	
Eleutherodactylus parabates	Neiba whistling frog	Critically endangered		X
Eleutherodactylus paralius	Coastal red-rumped frog	Near threatened		X
Eleutherodactylus parapelates	Macaya burrowing frog	Critically endangered	X	
Eleutherodactylus patriciae	Hispaniolan Cordillera frog	Endangered		X
Eleutherodactylus paulsoni	Hispaniolan pink-rumped frog	Critically endangered	X	
Eleutherodactylus pictissimus	Hispaniolan yellow-mottled frog	Vulnerable	X	X
Eleutherodactylus pituinus	Hispaniolan melodius frog	Endangered		X
Eleutherodactylus poolei	Citadel frog	Critically endangered	X	
Eleutherodactylus probolaeus	Boca De Yuma frog	Endangered		X
Eleutherodactylus rhodesi	Port-de-Paix frog	Critically endangered	X	
Eleutherodactylus rucillensis	Rucilla streamside frog	Not assessed		X
Eleutherodactylus rufifemoralis	Baoruco red-legged frog	Critically endangered		X
Eleutherodactylus ruthae	Eastern burrowing frog	Endangered		X
Eleutherodactylus schmidti	Hispaniolan streamside frog	Critically endangered		X
Eleutherodactylus sciagraphus	La Hotte striped-legged frog	Critically endangered	X	
Eleutherodactylus semipalmatus	Tiburon streamfrog	Critically endangered	X	
Eleutherodactylus sommeri	Massif du Nord whistling frog	Endangered	X	X
Eleutherodactylus thorectes	Macaya breast-spotted frog	Critically endangered	X	
Eleutherodactylus tychathrous	Vallejuelo burrowing frog	Not assessed		X
Eleutherodactylus ventrilineatus	Macaya dusky frog	Critically endangered	X	
Eleutherodactylus warreni	Tortue frog	Critically endangered	X	
Eleutherodactylus weinlandi	Hispaniolan red-rumped frog	Least concern	X	X
Eleutherodactylus wetmorei	Tiburon whistling frog	Vulnerable	X	X

Family Hylidae:
Species	Common name	Conservation status	Haiti	Dominican Republic
Boana heilprini	Hispaniolan green treefrog	Vulnerable	X	X
Osteopilus dominicensis	Hispaniolan laughing treefrog	Least concern	X	X
Osteopilus pulchrilineatus	Hispaniolan yellow treefrog	Vulnerable	X	X
Osteopilus vastus	Hispaniolan giant treefrog	Vulnerable	X	X

Family Leptodactylidae
Species	Common name	Conservation status	Haiti	Dominican Republic
Leptodactylus albilabris	White lipped ditch frog	Least concern		X

Family Ranidae:
Species	Common name	Conservation status	Haiti	Dominican Republic
Lithobates catesbeianus	American bullfrog	Least concern	X	X
