= List of amphibians of Haiti =

This is a list of amphibians found in Haiti. There are 58 amphibian species recorded in Haiti.

| Common name | Scientific name authority | Preferred habitat | Native range | Status (IUCN) w/ population trend |
|---|---|---|---|---|
Family Bufonidae: True toads
| Eastern crested toad | Bufo fractus (Schwartz, 1972) | Subtropical or tropical dry forests, subtropical or tropical moist lowland forests, intermittent freshwater marshes, and heavily degraded former forest. | Haiti to the Dominican Republic | Decreasing |
| Southern crested toad | Bufo guentheri (Cochran, 1941) | Subtropical or tropical dry forests, subtropical or tropical moist lowland forests, intermittent freshwater marshes, and heavily degraded former forest. | Haiti to the Dominican Republic | Decreasing |
| Cane toad | Bufo marinus (Linnaeus, 1758) | A nocturnal and terrestrial toad that inhabits humid areas with adequate cover, including cane fields, savannah, open forest, well watered yards and gardens. It also inhabits dry equatorial forests | North America to South America | Increasing |
Family Eleutherodactylidae: Frogs
| Abbott's robber frog | Eleutherodactylus abbotti Cochran, 1923 | Subtropical or tropical moist montane forests, pastureland, plantations, rural gardens, urban areas, and heavily degraded former forest. | Haiti to the Dominican Republic | Stable |
| Barahona rock frog | Eleutherodactylus alcoae Schwartz, 1971 | Subtropical or tropical dry forests, rocky areas, and caves. | Haiti to the Dominican Republic | Decreasing |
| Mozart's frog | Eleutherodactylus amadeus Hedges, Thomas & Franz, 1987 | Subtropical or tropical moist montane forests. | Haiti | Decreasing |
| Tiburon burrowing frog | Eleutherodactylus aporostegus Schwartz, 1965 | Data deficient | Haiti | Trend unknown |
| Apostates robber frog | Eleutherodactylus apostates Schwartz, 1973 | Subtropical or tropical moist lowland forests, subtropical or tropical moist montane forests, and rivers. | Haiti | Trend unknown |
| Baoruco hammer frog | Eleutherodactylus armstrongi Noble & Hassler, 1933 | Subtropical or tropical moist lowland forests and subtropical or tropical moist montane forests. | Haiti to the Dominican Republic | Decreasing |
| South Island telegraph frog | Eleutherodactylus audanti Cochran, 1934 | Subtropical or tropical moist lowland forests and subtropical or tropical moist montane forests. | Haiti to the Dominican Republic | Decreasing |
| La Hotte bush frog | Eleutherodactylus bakeri Cochran, 1935 | Subtropical or tropical moist lowland forests and subtropical or tropical moist montane forests. | Haiti | Critically endangered Decreasing |
| | Eleutherodactylus bothroboans Schwartz, 1965 | Data deficient | Haiti | Trend unknown |
| Short-nosed green frog | Eleutherodactylus brevirostris Shreve, 1936 | Subtropical or tropical moist lowland forests, subtropical or tropical moist montane forests, and heavily degraded former forest. | Haiti | Decreasing |
| | Eleutherodactylus caribe Hedges and Thomas, 1992 | Subtropical or tropical mangrove forests. | Haiti | Trend unknown |
| False green robber frog | Eleutherodactylus chlorophenax Schwartz, 1976 | Subtropical or tropical moist lowland forests, subtropical or tropical moist montane forests, and rocky areas. | Haiti | Decreasing |
| Caye Paul robber frog | Eleutherodactylus corona Hedges and Thomas, 1992 | Subtropical or tropical moist montane forests. | Haiti | Decreasing |
| | Eleutherodactylus counouspeus Schwartz, 1964 | Subtropical or tropical moist lowland forests and caves. | Haiti | Decreasing |
| | Eleutherodactylus darlingtoni Cochran, 1935 | Subtropical or tropical moist montane forests. | Haiti | Trend unknown |
| Patternless whistling frog | Eleutherodactylus diplasius Schwartz, 1973 | Lowland and montane forests. | Haiti | Trend unknown |
| Hispaniolan ventriloquial frog | Eleutherodactylus dolomedes Hedges and Thomas, 1992 | Subtropical or tropical moist montane forests. | Haiti | Decreasing |
| | Eleutherodactylus eunaster Schwartz, 1973 | Subtropical or tropical moist lowland forests and subtropical or tropical moist montane forests. | Haiti | Trend unknown |
| Khaki bromeliad frog | Eleutherodactylus fowleri Schwartz, 1973 | Subtropical or tropical moist lowland forests and subtropical or tropical moist montane forests. | Haiti to the Dominican Republic | Decreasing |
| La Selle red-legged frog | Eleutherodactylus furcyensis Shreve and Williams, 1963 | Subtropical or tropical moist montane forests, and heavily degraded former forest. | Haiti to the Dominican Republic | Trend unknown |
| La Hotte glanded frog | Eleutherodactylus glandulifer Cochran, 1935 | Subtropical or tropical moist lowland forests, subtropical or tropical moist montane forests, and intermittent rivers. | Haiti | Trend unknown |
| | Eleutherodactylus glanduliferoides Shreve, 1936 | Subtropical or tropical moist montane forests. | Haiti | Decreasing |
| Southwest Haiti robber frog | Eleutherodactylus glaphycompus Schwartz, 1973 | Subtropical or tropical moist lowland forests, subtropical or tropical moist montane forests, and rocky areas. | Haiti | Decreasing |
| Graham's robber frog | Eleutherodactylus grahami Schwartz, 1979 | Subtropical or tropical dry forests, subtropical or tropical moist shrubland, and rocky areas. | Haiti | Decreasing |
| Half-stripe bromeliad frog | Eleutherodactylus heminota Noble & Hassler, 1933 | Subtropical or tropical moist lowland forests and subtropical or tropical moist montane forests. | Haiti to the Dominican Republic | Decreasing |
| Baoruco burrowing frog | Eleutherodactylus hypostenor Schwartz, 1965 | Subtropical or tropical moist lowland forests, subtropical or tropical moist montane forests, and plantations. | Haiti to the Dominican Republic | Decreasing |
| Diquini robber frog | Eleutherodactylus inoptatus (Barbour, 1914) | Subtropical or tropical moist lowland forests, subtropical or tropical moist montane forests, plantations, rural gardens, and heavily degraded former forest. | Haiti to the Dominican Republic | Decreasing |
| La Selle dusky frog | Eleutherodactylus jugans (Cochran, 1937) | Subtropical or tropical moist montane forests | Haiti to the Dominican Republic | Decreasing |
| Castillon robber frog | Eleutherodactylus lamprotes Schwartz, 1973 | Subtropical or tropical moist lowland forests and subtropical or tropical moist montane forests. | Haiti | Decreasing |
| Southern pastel frog | Eleutherodactylus leoncei Shreve and Williams, 1963 | Subtropical or tropical moist montane forests. | Haiti to the Dominican Republic | Trend unknown |
| | Eleutherodactylus limbensis Lynn, 1958 | Data deficient | Haiti | Trend unknown |
| St. Nicholas robber frog | Eleutherodactylus lucioi Schwartz, 1980 | Subtropical or tropical moist lowland forests and rocky areas. | Haiti | Decreasing |
| | Eleutherodactylus melatrigonum Schwartz, 1966 | Data deficient | Haiti | Trend unknown |
| Spiny giant frog | Eleutherodactylus nortoni Schwartz, 1976 | Subtropical or tropical moist lowland forests or montanes, and caves. | Haiti to the Dominican Republic | Decreasing |
| Neiba telegraph frog | Eleutherodactylus notidodes Schwartz, 1966 | Upland closed-canopy forest and forest edge, under rocks and debris. | Haiti | Decreasing |
| Rednose robber frog | Eleutherodactylus oxyrhyncus (Dumeril and Bibron, 1841) | Subtropical or tropical moist lowland forests and subtropical or tropical moist montane forests. | Haiti to the Dominican Republic | Trend unknown |
| Coastal red-rumped frog | Eleutherodactylus paralius Schwartz, 1976 | Mesic habitats, such as plantations, woods, gardens, ravines and trash piles in urban areas. | Haiti | Stable |
| Casillon robber frog | Eleutherodactylus parapelates Hedges and Thomas, 1987 | Subtropical or tropical moist lowland forests and subtropical or tropical moist montane forests. | Haiti | Trend unknown |
| | Eleutherodactylus paulsoni Schwartz, 1964 | Subtropical or tropical moist lowland forests, intermittent rivers, and caves. | Haiti | Decreasing |
| Hispaniolan yellow-mottled frog | Eleutherodactylus pictissimus Cochran, 1935 | Subtropical or tropical dry forests, subtropical or tropical moist lowland forests, and subtropical or tropical moist montane forests. | Haiti to the Dominican Republic | Decreasing |
| | Eleutherodactylus poolei Cochran, 1938 | Subtropical or tropical moist lowland forests. | Haiti to the Dominican Republic | Trend unknown |
| Rhodes' robber frog | Eleutherodactylus rhodesi Schwartz, 1980 | Subtropical or tropical moist lowland forests and arable land. | Haiti | Trend unknown |
| Ruth's robber frog | Eleutherodactylus ruthae Noble, 1923 | Subtropical or tropical moist lowland forests. | Haiti to the Dominican Republic | Decreasing |
| Schmidt's robber frog | Eleutherodactylus schmidti Noble, 1923 | Subtropical or tropical moist lowland forests, subtropical or tropical moist montane forests, and rivers. | Haiti to the Dominican Republic | Decreasing |
| Sud robber frog | Eleutherodactylus sciagraphus Schwartz, 1973 | Subtropical or tropical moist lowland forests and subtropical or tropical moist montane forests. | Haiti | Trend unknown |
| Foothill robber frog | Eleutherodactylus semipalmatus Shreve, 1936 | Subtropical or tropical moist lowland forests, subtropical or tropical moist montane forests, and rivers. | Haiti | Decreasing |
| | Eleutherodactylus sommeri Schwartz, 1977 | Data deficient | Haiti | Trend unknown |
| Morne Macay robber frog | Eleutherodactylus thorectes Hedges, 1988 | Subtropical or tropical moist montane forests. | Haiti | Trend unknown |
| | Eleutherodactylus tychathrous Schwartz, 1965 | Data deficient | Haiti | Trend unknown |
| | Eleutherodactylus ventrilineatus (Shreve, 1936) | | Haiti | Trend unknown |
| | Eleutherodactylus warreni Schwartz, 1976 | | Haiti | Trend unknown |
| | Eleutherodactylus weinlandi Barbour, 1914 | | Haiti to the Dominican Republic | Trend unknown |
| | Eleutherodactylus wetmorei Cochran, 1932 | | Haiti to the Dominican Republic | Trend unknown |
Family Hylidae: Tree frogs and allies
| Hispaniolan giant tree frog | Osteopilus vastus (Cope, 1871) | | Haiti to the Dominican Republic | Trend unknown |
Family Ranidae: True frogs
| American bullfrog | Rana catesbeianas (Shaw, 1802) | | North America. Introduced in many other countries worldwide, including Haiti and the Dominican Republic. | Increasing |

== See also ==
- List of amphibians of Hispaniola
