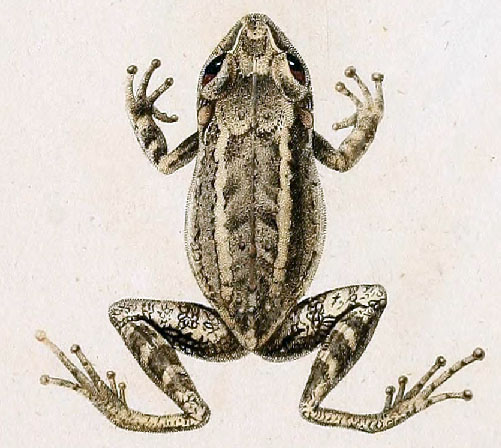

Conservation status
- Critically Endangered (IUCN 3.1)

Scientific classification
- Kingdom: Animalia
- Phylum: Chordata
- Class: Amphibia
- Order: Anura
- Clade: Brachycephaloidea
- Family: Eleutherodactylidae
- Genus: Eleutherodactylus
- Subgenus: Euhyas
- Species: E. oxyrhyncus

Binomial name
- Eleutherodactylus oxyrhyncus (Duméril and Bibron, 1841)

Synonyms
- Hylodes oxyrhyncus Duméril and Bibron, 1841; Hylodes oxyrhynchus — incorrect spelling Eleutherodactylus oxyrhynchus — incorrect spelling Eleutherodactylus femur-levis Cochran, 1935

= Eleutherodactylus oxyrhyncus =

Species of frog

Eleutherodactylus oxyrhyncus is a species of frog in the family Eleutherodactylidae. It is endemic to Hispaniola and known from the Massif de la Hotte and Massif de la Selle, occurring in both the Dominican Republic and Haiti. The common name is rednose robber frog.

E. oxyrhyncus is threatened by habitat loss caused by logging and agriculture. It is known from the Pic Macaya and La Visite National Parks, but habitat degradation is occurring in these areas too.
