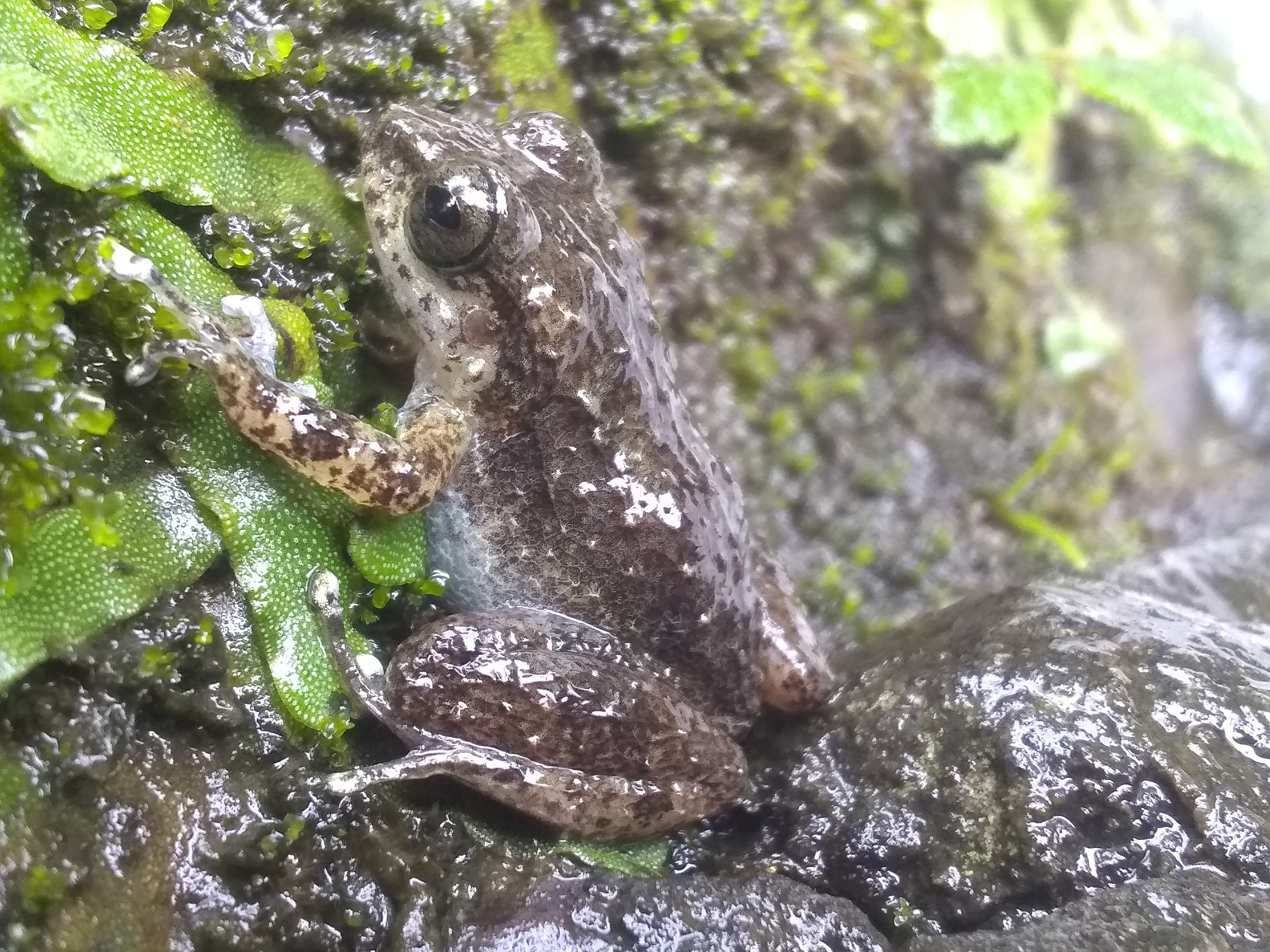

Conservation status
- Critically Endangered (IUCN 3.1)

Scientific classification
- Kingdom: Animalia
- Phylum: Chordata
- Class: Amphibia
- Order: Anura
- Family: Eleutherodactylidae
- Genus: Eleutherodactylus
- Species: E. semipalmatus

Binomial name
- Eleutherodactylus semipalmatus Shreve, 1936

= Eleutherodactylus semipalmatus =

Species of frog

Eleutherodactylus semipalmatus is a species of frog in the family Eleutherodactylidae. It is endemic to Haiti and known from the Massif de la Hotte and Massif de la Selle. Its common name is foothill robber frog. Its natural habitat is streams and their vicinity in mesic hardwood forest at elevations of 303–1,697 m (994–5,568 ft) asl.

This formerly abundant species had not been reported since 1985 and was thought to be already extinct. It was rediscovered in 2011/2013 during expeditions to the area that is now Grand Bois National Park. The frog is threatened by habitat loss caused by logging and agriculture. It was known from the Pic Macaya and La Visite National Parks, but habitat degradation is occurring in these areas.
