= Eleutherodactylus parabates =

Conservation status
- Endangered (IUCN 3.1)

Scientific classification
- Kingdom: Animalia
- Phylum: Chordata
- Class: Amphibia
- Order: Anura
- Family: Eleutherodactylidae
- Genus: Eleutherodactylus
- Species: E. parabates

Binomial name
- Eleutherodactylus parabates Schwartz, 1964

Synonyms
- Euhyas parabates (Schwartz, 1964)

Species of frog

Eleutherodactylus parabates, also known as Independencia robber frog and Neiba whistling frog, is a species of frog in the family Eleutherodactylidae. It is endemic to Hispaniola and found along the crest of the Sierra de Neiba, near the border between the Dominican Republic and Haiti. The specific name parabates is Greek for "transgressor" and refers to this species being the first Hispaniolan member of the "Eleutherodactylus dimidiatus species group" recorded north of the Plain of the Cul-de-Sac–Valle de Neiba (the southern species are Eleutherodactylus jugans and E. ventrilineatus).

== Description ==
Adult females measure 22–24 mm (0.87–0.94 in) and adult males, based on a single specimen, 18 mm (0.7 in) in snout–vent length. The snout is rather pointed. The tympanum is relatively large. The fingers and toes have moderately well-developed discs but lack webbing. The dorsal coloration consists of a brown longitudinal band running from the snout to the groin; some individuals have a median tan dorsal line. The dorsal band is separated from the darker brown sides by a faint tan dorsolateral stripe. The lips are mottled. The throat and belly are yellowish tan with heavy brown mottling.

== Habitat and conservation ==
Eleutherodactylus parabates inhabits high-elevation (1,455–1,870 m (4,774–6,135 ft) a.s.l.) dense, closed hardwood forest where it can be found under rocks and logs and in low-arboreal bromeliads. Eggs are deposited on the ground and have direct development (i.e., there is no free-living larval stage).

Eleutherodactylus parabates can be moderately common in suitable habitat and was last recorded in 2019. However, the forest habitat this species depends on is declining rapidly. It is present in the Parque Nacional Sierra de Neiba, but habitat loss occurs also in the park.
