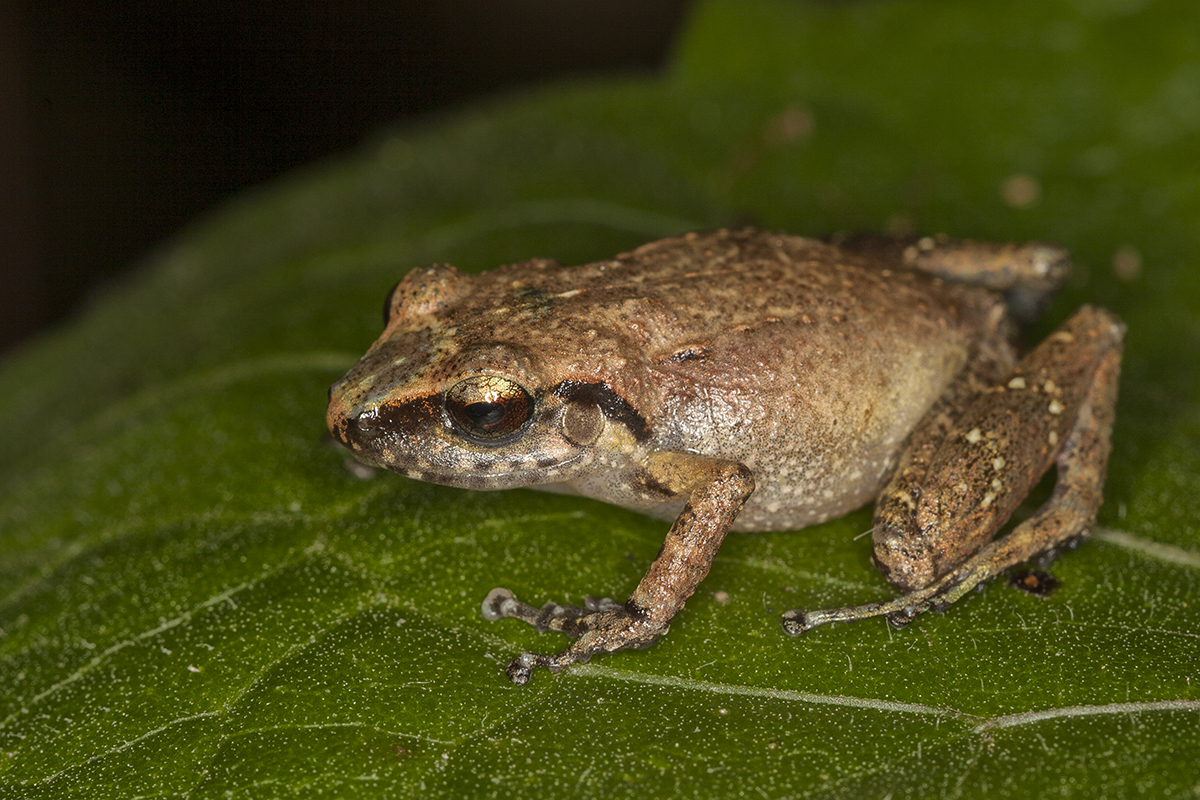
- E. minutus in the Dominican Republic

Conservation status
- Endangered (IUCN 3.1)

Scientific classification
- Kingdom: Animalia
- Phylum: Chordata
- Class: Amphibia
- Order: Anura
- Family: Eleutherodactylidae
- Genus: Eleutherodactylus
- Subgenus: Euhyas
- Species: E. minutus

Binomial name
- Eleutherodactylus minutus Noble, 1923

Synonyms
- Eleutherodactylus abbotti ssp. minutus — Shreve & Williams, 1963

= Eleutherodactylus minutus =

Species of frog

Eleutherodactylus minutus, also known as the Hispaniolan wheeping frog, is a species of frog in the family Eleutherodactylidae endemic to the Cordillera Central, Dominican Republic, at elevations of 879–2,300 m (2,884–7,546 ft) asl. Its common name is tiny robber frog. Its natural habitats are mesic upland broadleaf or pine forests. In suitable habitat it is moderately common. It is threatened by habitat loss caused by agriculture.
