= E. bakeri =

E. bakeri may refer to:

- Eleutherodactylus bakeri, a frog species endemic to Haiti
- Euproctis bakeri, Collenette, 1932, a moth species in the genus Euproctis

== See also ==
- Bakeri (disambiguation)
