= False green robber frog =

Conservation status
- Critically Endangered (IUCN 3.1)

Scientific classification
- Kingdom: Animalia
- Phylum: Chordata
- Class: Amphibia
- Order: Anura
- Family: Eleutherodactylidae
- Genus: Eleutherodactylus
- Subgenus: Pelorius
- Species: E. chlorophenax

Binomial name
- Eleutherodactylus chlorophenax Schwartz, 1976

Synonyms
- Pelorius chlorophenax (Schwartz, 1976)

Species of amphibian

The false green robber frog (Eleutherodactylus chlorophenax) is a species of frogs in the family Eleutherodactylidae. It is endemic to the Massif de la Hotte, southwestern Haiti.

== Etymology ==
The specific name chlorophenax is derived from Greek words for "green" and "imposter", the first referring to the prevalent green body color and the latter alluding to the resemblance of this species to Eleutherodactylus inoptatus.

== Description ==
The holotype, an adult male and the only type specimen, measured 59 mm (2.3 in) in snout–vent length (SVL). This is also the maximum (recorded) size for males, while the maximum female size is 77 mm (3.0 in) SVL. The head is slightly wider than it is long. The snout is truncate. The tympanum is visible. The dorsum is either green or tan with some green areas. Some individuals have weakly defined dark scapular spots and dorsolateral lines, but otherwise the dorsum is almost without any distinct pattern. The fingers are unwebbed while the toes are slightly webbed. Both fingers and toes are long and bear relatively large discs.

== Habitat and conservation ==
The species' natural habitats are upland hardwood forests and ravine pinelands at elevations of 990–1,290 m (3,250–4,230 ft) above sea level. The range of this species is suffering from severe habitat destruction, primarily due to logging for charcoal production by local people and by slash-and-burn agriculture. Its range overlaps with the Pic Macaya National Park, but the park is not managed for conservation.
