= Eleutherodactylus glanduliferoides =

Conservation status
- Critically Endangered (IUCN 3.1)

Scientific classification
- Kingdom: Animalia
- Phylum: Chordata
- Class: Amphibia
- Order: Anura
- Family: Eleutherodactylidae
- Genus: Eleutherodactylus
- Subgenus: Euhyas
- Species: E. glanduliferoides

Binomial name
- Eleutherodactylus glanduliferoides Shreve, 1936

Species of frog

Eleutherodactylus glanduliferoides is a species of frog in the family Eleutherodactylidae. It is endemic to the Massif de la Selle, Haiti. It is a very rare species that may already be extinct. Its natural habitat is tropical moist montane forest at elevations of 1,515–2,121 m (4,970–6,959 ft) asl. It is threatened by habitat loss caused by charcoaling and slash-and-burn agriculture. The known locality is just outside the La Visite National Park (which has no active management for conservation, and sees continuing habitat loss).
