= Eleutherodactylus darlingtoni =

Conservation status
- Critically Endangered (IUCN 3.1)

Scientific classification
- Kingdom: Animalia
- Phylum: Chordata
- Class: Amphibia
- Order: Anura
- Family: Eleutherodactylidae
- Genus: Eleutherodactylus
- Species: E. darlingtoni

Binomial name
- Eleutherodactylus darlingtoni Cochran, 1935

Species of frog

Eleutherodactylus darlingtoni is a species of frog in the family Eleutherodactylidae endemic to the Massif de la Selle, Haiti; it is expected to occur in the Dominican Republic. It is a rare species occurring in high-elevation pine forest. It is threatened by habitat loss; while the species occurs in the La Visite National Park, there is no active management for conservation, and the habitat loss continues in the park.
