= Eleutherodactylus corona =

Conservation status
- Critically Endangered (IUCN 3.1)

Scientific classification
- Kingdom: Animalia
- Phylum: Chordata
- Class: Amphibia
- Order: Anura
- Family: Eleutherodactylidae
- Genus: Eleutherodactylus
- Subgenus: Euhyas
- Species: E. corona

Binomial name
- Eleutherodactylus corona Hedges and Thomas, 1992

Species of frog

Eleutherodactylus corona is a species of frog in the family Eleutherodactylidae. It is endemic to the Massif de la Hotte, Haiti. The specific name corona is derived from the Latin word for "crown" and refers to the distinctive tubercles on the top of the head of these frogs. Common name Caye Paul robber frog has been coined for it.

== Description ==
Adult males measure 17.2–18.4 mm (0.68–0.72 in) and adult females 16.6–19.1 mm (0.65–0.75 in) in snout–vent length; adults weight about 0.5 grams (0.02 oz). The body is dorsoventrally flattened. The head is as wide as the body and has one or more distinct, subconical tubercles on its dorsal surface. The snout is subacuminate. The tympanum is round and of moderate size; the supratympanic fold is weakly defined. Dorsal skin is smooth to weakly areolate; the flanks are areolate and ventral skin is strongly areolate. All fingers and toes have lateral ridges and expanded tips but no webbing. The dorsal ground color is greenish-yellowish to greenish-tan, sometimes orange posteriorly. The upper eyelids are iridescent light greenish-blue. The iris is golden brown. There is a dark brown scapular chevron or W-shaped marking. The head is more heavily pigmented with dark brown spots than the body. Some individuals have light brown shank bars. The belly is metallic light green; the rest of the venter is yellowish-green.

== Habitat and conservation ==
Eleutherodactylus corona is known from a high-elevation cloud forest at 1,120 m (3,670 ft) above sea level. It is a very rare, arboreal species. Males call from bromeliads or orchids. It is threatened by habitat loss caused primarily by logging for charcoaling and slash-and-burn agriculture. While this species occurs in the Pic Macaya National Park, there is no active management for conservation, and the habitat loss continues also in the park.
