= Eleutherodactylus dolomedes =

Conservation status
- Critically Endangered (IUCN 3.1)

Scientific classification
- Kingdom: Animalia
- Phylum: Chordata
- Class: Amphibia
- Order: Anura
- Family: Eleutherodactylidae
- Genus: Eleutherodactylus
- Subgenus: Euhyas
- Species: E. dolomedes

Binomial name
- Eleutherodactylus dolomedes Hedges and Thomas, 1992

Species of amphibian

Eleutherodactylus dolomedes (common names: Hispaniolan ventriloquial frog, Hedge's [sic] robber frog, Hedges' robber frog) is a species of frog in the family Eleutherodactylidae. It is endemic to the Massif de la Hotte, Haiti.

== Description ==
The type series consists of three adult males that measure 18.7–21.6 mm (0.74–0.85 in) in snout–vent length; the heaviest specimen weighs 0.92 grams (0.03 oz). The snout is subacuminate and short. The tympanum is small and round. All fingers and toes have expanded tips but no webbing. Skin is dorsally and laterally moderately tuberculate; the venter grades from being smooth anteriorly to tuberculate posteriorly. The dorsal ground color is orange-brown or orange-tan. There is one scapular and one midbody brown, ill-defined chevron. Narrow, light, dorsolateral stripes may be present. Limbs are marked with gray bars. Males have a single, external vocal sac.

The male advertisement call is ventriloquial and emitted at long intervals (about two minutes), making it difficult to find the calling frog. The call itself is a rapid, seven-note, high-pitched series of "chirps", with the dominant frequency of about 4.7 kHz.

== Habitat and conservation ==
Eleutherodactylus dolomedes is an arboreal species inhabiting high-elevation cloud forest at an elevation of 1,120 m (3,670 ft) above sea level. The types were found at night when they were calling in trees some 2–3 m (7–10 ft) above the ground. It is only known from one site within the Pic Macaya National Park. However, there is no active management for conservation, and habitat loss continues in the park.
