= Eleutherodactylus apostates =

Conservation status
- Critically Endangered (IUCN 3.1)

Scientific classification
- Kingdom: Animalia
- Phylum: Chordata
- Class: Amphibia
- Order: Anura
- Clade: Brachycephaloidea
- Family: Eleutherodactylidae
- Genus: Eleutherodactylus
- Species: E. apostates

Binomial name
- Eleutherodactylus apostates Schwartz, 1973

Species of frog

Eleutherodactylus apostates is a species of frog in the family Eleutherodactylidae endemic to the Massif de la Hotte, southwestern Haiti. It is sometimes referred to as the apostates robber frog The specific name is an allusion to its closest relatives being from northern Hispaniola, its southern distribution being an apostasy of sorts.

== Description ==
Eleutherodactylus apostates males are much smaller than females, only 21–23 mm (0.83–0.91 in) in snout–vent length compared 37–43 mm (1.5–1.7 in) in females. Dorsal colouration and patterns are variable, particularly in females, but generally speaking Eleutherodactylus apostates is a pinkish tan to grayish brown frog.

== Habitat and conservation ==
Eleutherodactylus apostates live in closed-canopy forest at elevations of 333–1,640 m (1,093–5,381 ft) asl. Males call near streams. The type locality was a wooded ravine bordering a small creek.

The range of this species is suffering from severe habitat destruction, primarily due to logging for charcoal production by local people and by slash-and-burn agriculture. Part of its range overlaps with the Pic Macaya National Park, but the park is not managed for conservation. It was formerly common in suitable habitat but has not been seen after 2005.
