= Eleutherodactylus eunaster =

Conservation status
- Critically Endangered (IUCN 3.1)

Scientific classification
- Kingdom: Animalia
- Phylum: Chordata
- Class: Amphibia
- Order: Anura
- Clade: Brachycephaloidea
- Family: Eleutherodactylidae
- Genus: Eleutherodactylus
- Species: E. eunaster

Binomial name
- Eleutherodactylus eunaster Schwartz, 1973

Species of frog

Eleutherodactylus eunaster is a species of frog in the family Eleutherodactylidae endemic to the Massif de la Hotte, Haiti. Its natural habitat is mesic hardwood closed-canopy forest at elevations of 575–1,300 m (1,886–4,265 ft) asl. It is an arboreal species that is moderately common in suitable habitat. It is threatened by habitat loss primarily caused by logging for charcoaling and slash-and-burn agriculture. While the species occurs in the Pic Macaya National Park, there is no active management for conservation, and habitat loss continues also in the park.
