= Eleutherodactylus counouspeus =

Conservation status
- Endangered (IUCN 3.1)

Scientific classification
- Kingdom: Animalia
- Phylum: Chordata
- Class: Amphibia
- Order: Anura
- Family: Eleutherodactylidae
- Genus: Eleutherodactylus
- Species: E. counouspeus

Binomial name
- Eleutherodactylus counouspeus Schwartz, 1964

Synonyms
- Euhyas counouspea (Schwartz, 1964)

Species of frog

Eleutherodactylus counouspeus, also known as Counou robber frog and yellow cave frog, is a species of frog in the family Eleutherodactylidae. It is endemic to the Massif de la Hotte, southwestern Haiti. The specific name counouspeus refers to its type locality, Counou Bois Cave, with speus being Greek for "cave". Hedges and colleagues suggested in 2008 that it should be placed in its own monotypic subgenus, Schwartzius, reflecting its distinctiveness and honoring Albert Schwartz for "his contributions to the herpetology of the West Indies."

== Description ==
Eleutherodactylus counouspeus is a relatively large Eleutherodactylus species: males can grow to 48 mm (1.9 in) and females to 57 mm (2.2 in) in snout–vent length. The snout is truncate. The tympanum is oval and distinct. The digital discs are well-developed. The fingers lack webbing while the toes have rudimentary webbing. The dorsum is greenish yellow to tan, with black or gray markings. These include an interocular bar that is often followed by a scapular +-shaped blotch. The limbs have rather diffuse dark-gray spotting. The throat is yellowish green, heavily mottled with brownish. The belly is pinkish with admixture of yellow-green, suffused with brown stippling. Males have an external (but not prominent) vocal sac.

== Habitat and conservation ==
Eleutherodactylus counouspeus occurs in limestone caves and crevices in closed, humid forest at elevations of 303–1,200 m (994–3,937 ft) above sea level, as well as in disturbed forest habitats. Eggs are deposited in caves and have direct development (i.e., there is no free-living larval stage).

It is a moderately common species but threatened by habitat loss. The species occurs in the Pic Macaya National Park, but there is no active management for conservation, and habitat loss continues in the park. It is also present in the better managed Grand Bois National Park.
