= Ruth Crosby Noble =

American author and herpetologist

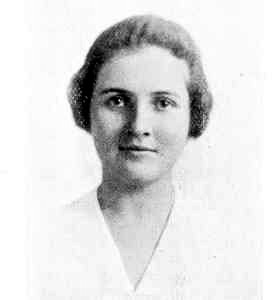
- Noble circa 1918
- Born: Ruth Crosby; 1896/1897; Hartford
- Died: March 1988 (aged 91); Allendale
- Alma mater: Wellesley College
- Occupation: Herpetologist, writer
- Spouse(s): G.K. Noble

Ruth Crosby Noble (1896/1897 – March 1988) was an American author and herpetologist. Working for the American Museum of Natural History, she and her husband Gladwyn Kingsley Noble discovered a new species of frog, the Eleutherodactylus ruthae, named for her. Noble later authored The Nature of the Beast, a book on animal behavior.

== Life and career ==
Born Ruth Elizabeth Crosby in 1896 or 1897, she was brought up in Hartford, Connecticut, and studied at Wellesley College in Massachusetts. While a student there, she met her future husband, Gladwyn Kingsley Noble, then a student at Harvard University. They would have two sons. She later moved to New York, and worked as an assistant at the departments of education and herpetology of the American Museum of Natural History from 1919 until 1923. At the museum, she worked to make museum exhibits more accessible to blind people. She was also a member of the American Association of University Women, and was active within the United Nations.

While at the museum, the Nobles undertook an expedition to Hispaniola to study the rhinoceros iguana and the Hispaniolan giant tree frog, both of which were very poorly known to science at the time. The Nobles were able to capture and send to the museum more than 200 live frogs and 40 iguanas: Gladwyn Noble would write that they had been "fortunate in finding both forms and in working out their life histories". She and her husband discovered the frog Eleutherodactylus ruthae during an expedition in the Dominican Republic financed by the museum; the frog was named after Ruth by her husband. While working at the museum, she pursued a master's degree at Columbia University.

In 1945, Noble published The Nature of the Beast, a book written on animal behavior based on research and notes by her husband. It is a compendium work written in easy-to-understand English, and incorporated material from both natural history observations and laboratory experiments. Recurring themes in its 17 chapters include social relations and sensation in animals. The manuscript was read by both psychologists and naturalists prior to publication: Robert Yerkes, Frank Beach, and Ernst Mayr were among those given access to portions of it. A review of the book in the Psychological Bulletin commended the breadth with which its material was covered without sacrificing detail, and recommended its use in courses on comparative psychology. Writing in the Annals of the Entomological Society of America, a reviewer stated that the book had the "rare quality of combining entertainment with sound scientific value".

== Personal life ==
Noble was a member of the First Presbyterian Church of Englewood and president of the Englewood Women's Club.

== Death ==
Noble died on March 15 or March 27, 1988, aged 91, at a nursing home in Allendale, New Jersey. She was survived by her two sons and two grandchildren.

== Selected works ==
- Noble, G. Kingsley; Noble, Ruth C. (August 20, 1923). "The Anderson tree frog (Hyla andersonii Baird)—Observations on its habits and life history". Zoologica: Scientific Contributions of the New York Zoological Society. 2 (18): 416–455. doi:10.5962/p.206603.
- Noble, Ruth Crosby; Noble, Gladwyn Kingsley (1945). The Nature of the Beast: A Popular Account of Animal Psychology from the Point of View of a Naturalist. Doubleday, Doran, Incorporated. ISBN 978-0-598-99002-0.
