= Eleutherodactylus parapelates =

Conservation status
- Critically Endangered (IUCN 3.1)

Scientific classification
- Kingdom: Animalia
- Phylum: Chordata
- Class: Amphibia
- Order: Anura
- Family: Eleutherodactylidae
- Genus: Eleutherodactylus
- Subgenus: Pelorius
- Species: E. parapelates

Binomial name
- Eleutherodactylus parapelates Hedges and Thomas, 1987

Species of frog

Eleutherodactylus parapelates is a species of frog in the family Eleutherodactylidae. It is endemic to the Massif de la Hotte in southwestern Haiti. Common names Casillon robber frog (sic — the type locality is spelled "Castillon") and Macaya burrowing frog have been proposed for it.

== Description ==
Adult males measure on average 48.9 mm (1.93 in) in snout–vent length and can reach 52 mm (2.0 in); females are unknown. The snout is protruding in profile. The canthus rostralis is well defined. The supra-tympanic fold is prominent and hides the upper edge of the tympanum. The fingers and toes have expanded tips; toes are unwebbed but fingers have indistinct lateral ridges. The dorsum is dark brown to pale brown, almost tan, and has darker spotting. There are black supra-tympanic markings.

== Habitat and conservation ==
Its natural habitats are tropical closed forests at elevations of 950–1,050 m (3,120–3,440 ft) above sea level. It is a fossorial species. Males call from shallow, underground chambers, and also the eggs are laid underground. However, one individual was found on herbaceous vegetation about 1 m above the ground. Calling males can be found quite close to each other (about 1 m apart).

Eleutherodactylus parapelates is threatened by habitat loss: its range is suffering from severe habitat destruction, primarily due to logging for charcoal production by local people and by slash-and-burn agriculture. Part of its range overlaps with the Pic Macaya National Park, but the park is not managed for conservation. It was formerly moderately common in suitable habitat but has now largely disappeared.
