= Eleutherodactylus glandulifer =

Conservation status
- Critically Endangered (IUCN 3.1)

Scientific classification
- Kingdom: Animalia
- Phylum: Chordata
- Class: Amphibia
- Order: Anura
- Family: Eleutherodactylidae
- Genus: Eleutherodactylus
- Subgenus: Euhyas
- Species: E. glandulifer

Binomial name
- Eleutherodactylus glandulifer Cochran, 1935
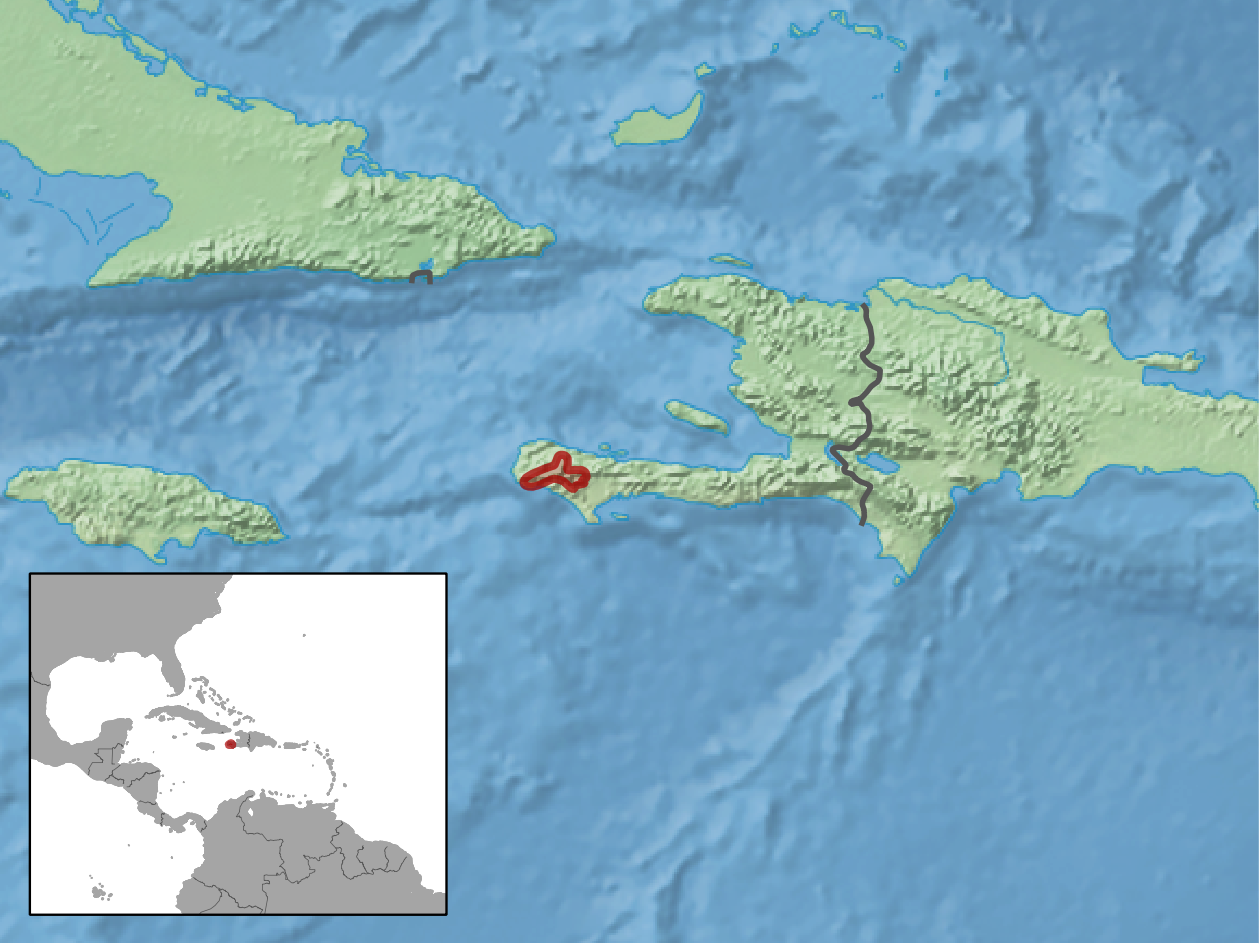

Species of amphibian

Eleutherodactylus glandulifer (common names: La Hotte glanded frog, Doris' robber frog) is a species of frog in the family Eleutherodactylidae endemic to the Massif de la Hotte, Haiti. Its natural habitat is closed-canopy forest, usually near streams. Its most distinctive feature are its striking blue sapphire-colored eyes—a highly unusual trait among amphibians.

It is threatened by habitat loss; while the species occurs in the Pic Macaya National Park, there is no active management for conservation, and the habitat loss continues in the park.
