= Eleutherodactylus paulsoni =

Conservation status
- Critically Endangered (IUCN 3.1)

Scientific classification
- Kingdom: Animalia
- Phylum: Chordata
- Class: Amphibia
- Order: Anura
- Clade: Brachycephaloidea
- Family: Eleutherodactylidae
- Genus: Eleutherodactylus
- Species: E. paulsoni

Binomial name
- Eleutherodactylus paulsoni Schwartz, 1964

Species of frog

Eleutherodactylus paulsoni is a species of frog in the family Eleutherodactylidae. It is endemic to the Tiburon Peninsula, Haiti. It is a terrestrial frog. It is typically found in association with caves or creek beds located in closed forest, from sea level to 750 m (2,460 ft) asl. Habitat loss caused by logging and agriculture is threat to this species. It is known from the Pic Macaya National Park, but habitat degradation is occurring in the park too.
