= Spiny giant frog =

- Spiny giant frog in the Dominican Republic

Conservation status
- Critically Endangered (IUCN 3.1)

Scientific classification
- Kingdom: Animalia
- Phylum: Chordata
- Class: Amphibia
- Order: Anura
- Clade: Brachycephaloidea
- Family: Eleutherodactylidae
- Genus: Eleutherodactylus
- Subgenus: Pelorius
- Species: E. nortoni

Binomial name
- Eleutherodactylus nortoni Schwartz, 1976

Species of frog endemic to Hispaniola

The spiny giant frog or Norton's robber frog (Eleutherodactylus nortoni) is a species of frog in the family Eleutherodactylidae. It is named after James W. Norton who accompanied Albert Schwartz in his 1974 expedition to Hispaniola and collected the holotype.

== Distribution ==
It is endemic to Hispaniola and known from the Massif de la Hotte, Massif de la Selle, and Sierra de Baoruco, occurring in both the Dominican Republic and Haiti.

== Description ==
The five adult males in the type series measure 52–66 mm (2.0–2.6 in) in snout–vent length. The colouration is green with darker green, irregular blotches. These blotches become nearly diagonal laterally. The fore- and hindlimbs have subcircular blotches; the thighs have three bars.

The male advertisement call is a series of about five rising glissando trills, ending in a semi-whistle.

== Habitat and conservation ==
The species' natural habitats are sinkhole caves in upland broadleaf forest and forest remnants at elevations of 576–1,515 m (1,890–4,970 ft) above sea level. Males are calling from tall vegetation and rocks. Once considered locally not rare, Eleutherodactylus nortoni is now uncommon and assessed as "critically endangered".

== Threats ==
=== Haiti ===
In Haiti, the primary threat to the environment is ongoing habitat destruction, primarily attributed to charcoal production, small-scale agriculture, and agro-industrial farming. This degradation of natural habitats is occurring even within protected areas.

=== Sierra de Bahoruco region of the Dominican Republic ===
In Sierra de Bahoruco National Park of the Dominican Republic, deforestation, driven by charcoal production and agro-industry practices, particularly for avocado cultivation. Both natural and human-induced fires are becoming more frequent, particularly in dry years.
