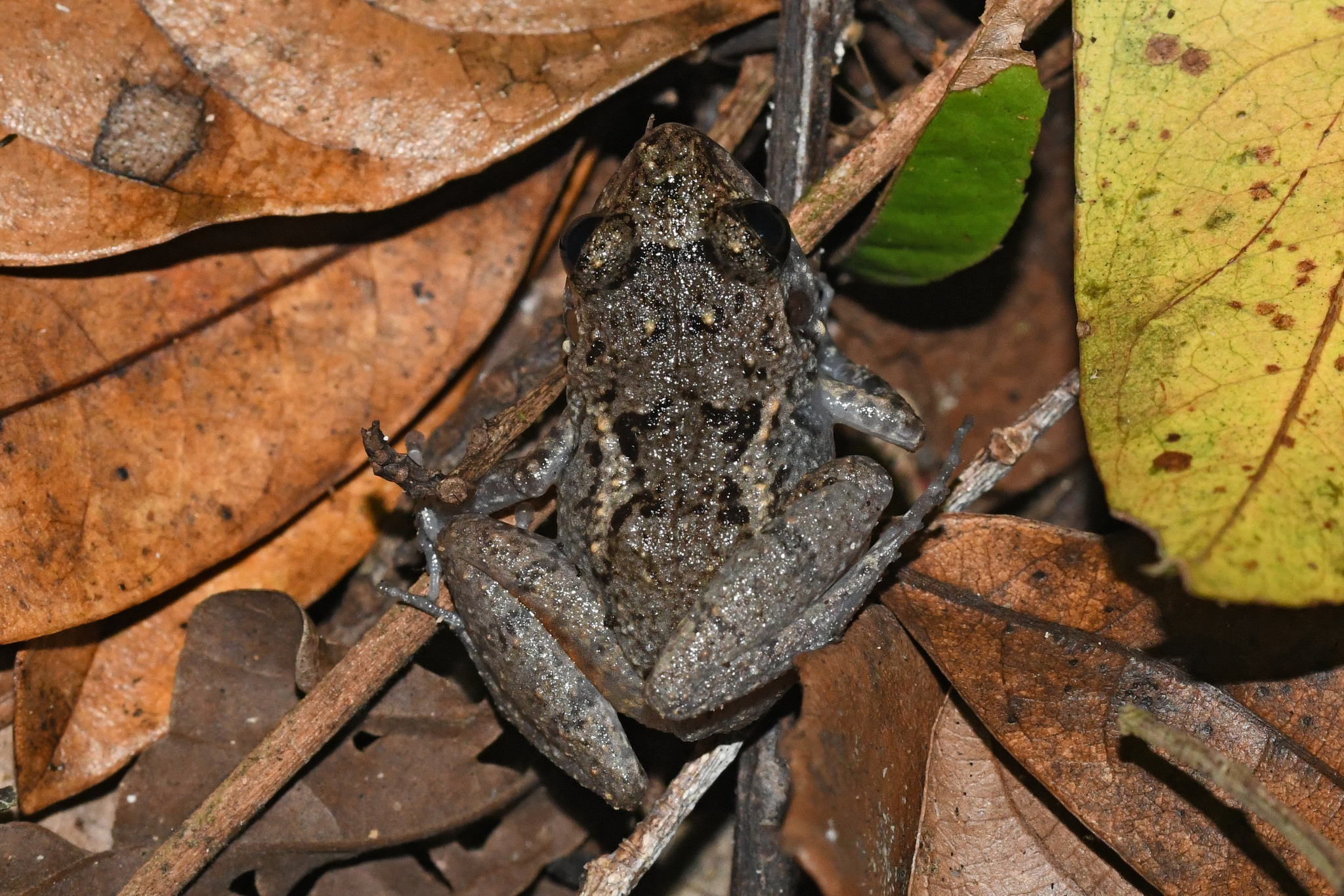

Conservation status
- Critically Endangered (IUCN 3.1)

Scientific classification
- Kingdom: Animalia
- Phylum: Chordata
- Class: Amphibia
- Order: Anura
- Family: Eleutherodactylidae
- Genus: Eleutherodactylus
- Subgenus: Euhyas
- Species: E. furcyensis

Binomial name
- Eleutherodactylus furcyensis Shreve and Williams, 1963

= La Selle red-legged frog =

Species of amphibian

The La Selle red-legged frog or Furcy robber frog (Eleutherodactylus furcyensis) is a species of frog in the family Eleutherodactylidae. It is endemic to southern Hispaniola and occurs in both Haiti and the Dominican Republic. Specifically, it occurs on the Massif de la Selle (Haiti) to the western Baoruco Mountain Range (Dominican Republic). Its natural habitat is upland mesic pine forest, where it is usually found under rocks and logs. It is threatened by habitat loss caused by logging and agriculture. It is known from protected areas, but habitat loss continues also within those areas.
