= Khaki bromeliad frog =

Conservation status
- Critically Endangered (IUCN 3.1)

Scientific classification
- Kingdom: Animalia
- Phylum: Chordata
- Class: Amphibia
- Order: Anura
- Clade: Brachycephaloidea
- Family: Eleutherodactylidae
- Genus: Eleutherodactylus
- Species: E. fowleri

Binomial name
- Eleutherodactylus fowleri Schwartz, 1973

Species of amphibian

The khaki bromeliad frog or Fowler's robber frog (Eleutherodactylus fowleri) is a species of frog in the family Eleutherodactylidae endemic to Hispaniola. It occurs in the Massif de la Selle and is known from one site in the Dominican Republic and one in Haiti. It is named after Danny C. Fowler, collector of the holotype.

== Description ==
Males measure 28–31 mm (1.1–1.2 in) and females, based on two specimens only, 28–33 mm (1.1–1.3 in) in snout–vent length. Dorsum is almost metallic tan and has some darker brown flecking. Sides are marbled black and yellow-tan. Concealed surfaces are dark brown to dark grey. Venter is grey with scattered yellow chromatophores. The vocal sac is grey to black.

The male call is a two-note call, the second note being higher than the first one, and is preceded by about 4–5 warm-up notes. Calling sites are in trees, 1.8–7.6 m (5 ft 11 in – 24 ft 11 in) above the ground, probably also higher.

== Habitat and conservation ==
The natural habitat of Eleutherodactylus fowleri is high-elevation mesic forest. It is an arboreal species occurring in bromeliads in tall trees, using them for both hiding and breeding. It is threatened by habitat loss, particularly from felling large trees. It occurs in the Sierra de Bahoruco National Park in the Dominican Republic.
