= La Selle dusky frog =

Conservation status
- Critically Endangered (IUCN 3.1)

Scientific classification
- Kingdom: Animalia
- Phylum: Chordata
- Class: Amphibia
- Order: Anura
- Clade: Brachycephaloidea
- Family: Eleutherodactylidae
- Genus: Eleutherodactylus
- Species: E. jugans

Binomial name
- Eleutherodactylus jugans (Cochran, 1937)

Synonyms
- Leptodactylus darlingtoni Cochran, 1935

Species of amphibian

The La Selle dusky frog or Mable's robber frog (Eleutherodactylus jugans) is a species of frog in the family Eleutherodactylidae. It is endemic to Hispaniola and known from the Massif de la Selle, both in the Dominican Republic and in Haiti. Its natural habitats are mesic pine and broadleaf forests. It is threatened by habitat loss. It is moderately common in suitable habitat, but threatened by habitat loss caused by logging and agriculture. It is known from both La Visite National Park (Haiti) and Sierra de Bahoruco National Park (Dominican Republic), but habitat degradation is occurring in these areas too.
