= Eleutherodactylus lamprotes =

Conservation status
- Critically Endangered (IUCN 3.1)

Scientific classification
- Kingdom: Animalia
- Phylum: Chordata
- Class: Amphibia
- Order: Anura
- Clade: Brachycephaloidea
- Family: Eleutherodactylidae
- Genus: Eleutherodactylus
- Species: E. lamprotes

Binomial name
- Eleutherodactylus lamprotes Schwartz, 1973

Species of frog

Eleutherodactylus lamprotes is a species of frog in the family Eleutherodactylidae endemic to the Massif de la Hotte, Haiti. Its common name is Castillon robber frog. The specific name refers to its contrasting colour patterns.

== Description ==
Males measure 20–37 mm (0.79–1.46 in) in snout–vent length. Dorsum is patternless brown to tan, whereas concealed surfaces of thighs, underside of hindlimbs, and axillae are bright orange. Vocal sac dark is brown, and venter is dark brown with large white spots. Dorsum is weakly tuberculate, but upper eyelids and upper surface of head have prominent, almost spine-like tubercles.

== Habitat and conservation ==
The species' natural habitat is mesic upland forest at elevations of 818–1,455 m (2,684–4,774 ft) asl. It is an arboreal species found in bromeliads. It is moderately common in suitable habitat, but threatened by habitat loss. The species occurs in the Pic Macaya National Park, but there is no active management for conservation, and the habitat loss continues also in the park.
