= Eleutherodactylus caribe =

Conservation status
- Critically Endangered (IUCN 3.1)

Scientific classification
- Kingdom: Animalia
- Phylum: Chordata
- Class: Amphibia
- Order: Anura
- Family: Eleutherodactylidae
- Genus: Eleutherodactylus
- Species: E. caribe

Binomial name
- Eleutherodactylus caribe Hedges and Thomas, 1992

Species of frog

Eleutherodactylus caribe, the Caribbean robber frog or Haitian marshfrog, is a species of frog in the family Eleutherodactylidae endemic to the Tiburon Peninsula, Haiti. Its natural habitat is coastal mangrove marsh. It is only known from one site near Dame-Marie where it was last seen in 1991. It is threatened by habitat loss.

== Taxonomy ==
Eleutherodactylus caribe was formally described in 1992 based on an adult male specimen collected from near Dame-Marie, a small commune in the department of Grande'Anse in Haiti. The specific epithet is derived from the Spanish word meaning 'Caribbean', referring to the frog's unique habitat in a coastal mangrove swamp on the Caribbean Sea. It has the English common names Caribbean robber frog and Haitian marshfrog. The original description placed the species in the Eleutherodactylus bakeri species group in the subgenus Euhyas, a placement that was maintained by subsequent studies.

== Description ==
Eleutherodactylus caribe is a small species for its genus, reaching a snout–vent length of 15.7–18.1 mm (0.62–0.71 in) in males and 17.2–20.1 mm (0.68–0.79 in) in females. The back is dark brown with inconsistent markings, including a pale central stripe, a large pale splotch in the middle, and a "W" shape on the shoulders. The underside is dark brown to blackish. The species vocalizes by making a single high-pitched whistled note.

== Distribution and ecology ==
Eleutherodactylus caribe is endemic to the Tiburon Peninsula in far southwestern Haiti, where it has only been observed from near the commune of Dame-Marie. It inhabits coastal mangrove marshes, where it has been seen calling from mangrove leaves, grasses, and twigs a few meters above the water. It has only been seen twice, in 1991 and in 2010, from two localities very close to each other. An egg mass of the species was documented in July. Eggs probably hatch directly into juvenile frogs, instead of tadpoles.

== Conservation ==
Eleutherodactylus caribe is classified as being critically endangered by the IUCN due to its very small range, estimated to be 4 km^{2}, which is experiencing extreme habitat degradation. The forests it inhabits are threatened by logging due to urbanization and for timber. The species is also extremely vulnerable to climactic disturbances caused by climate change. It does not occur in any protected areas.
