= Eleutherodactylus rufifemoralis =

Conservation status
- Endangered (IUCN 3.1)

Scientific classification
- Kingdom: Animalia
- Phylum: Chordata
- Class: Amphibia
- Order: Anura
- Clade: Brachycephaloidea
- Family: Eleutherodactylidae
- Genus: Eleutherodactylus
- Subgenus: Euhyas
- Species: E. rufifemoralis

Binomial name
- Eleutherodactylus rufifemoralis Noble & Hassler, 1933

Species of frog

Eleutherodactylus rufifemoralis is a species of frog in the family Eleutherodactylidae endemic to the extreme eastern Baoruco Mountain Range, Dominican Republic, at elevations of 727–1,370 m (2,385–4,495 ft) asl. Its natural habitats are upland mesic broadleaf and pine forests. It is threatened by habitat loss caused by agriculture. It occurs in the Sierra de Bahoruco National Park, but better management of the park is needed.
