= Eleutherodactylus thorectes =

Conservation status
- Critically Endangered (IUCN 3.1)

Scientific classification
- Kingdom: Animalia
- Phylum: Chordata
- Class: Amphibia
- Order: Anura
- Clade: Brachycephaloidea
- Family: Eleutherodactylidae
- Genus: Eleutherodactylus
- Species: E. thorectes

Binomial name
- Eleutherodactylus thorectes Hedges, 1988
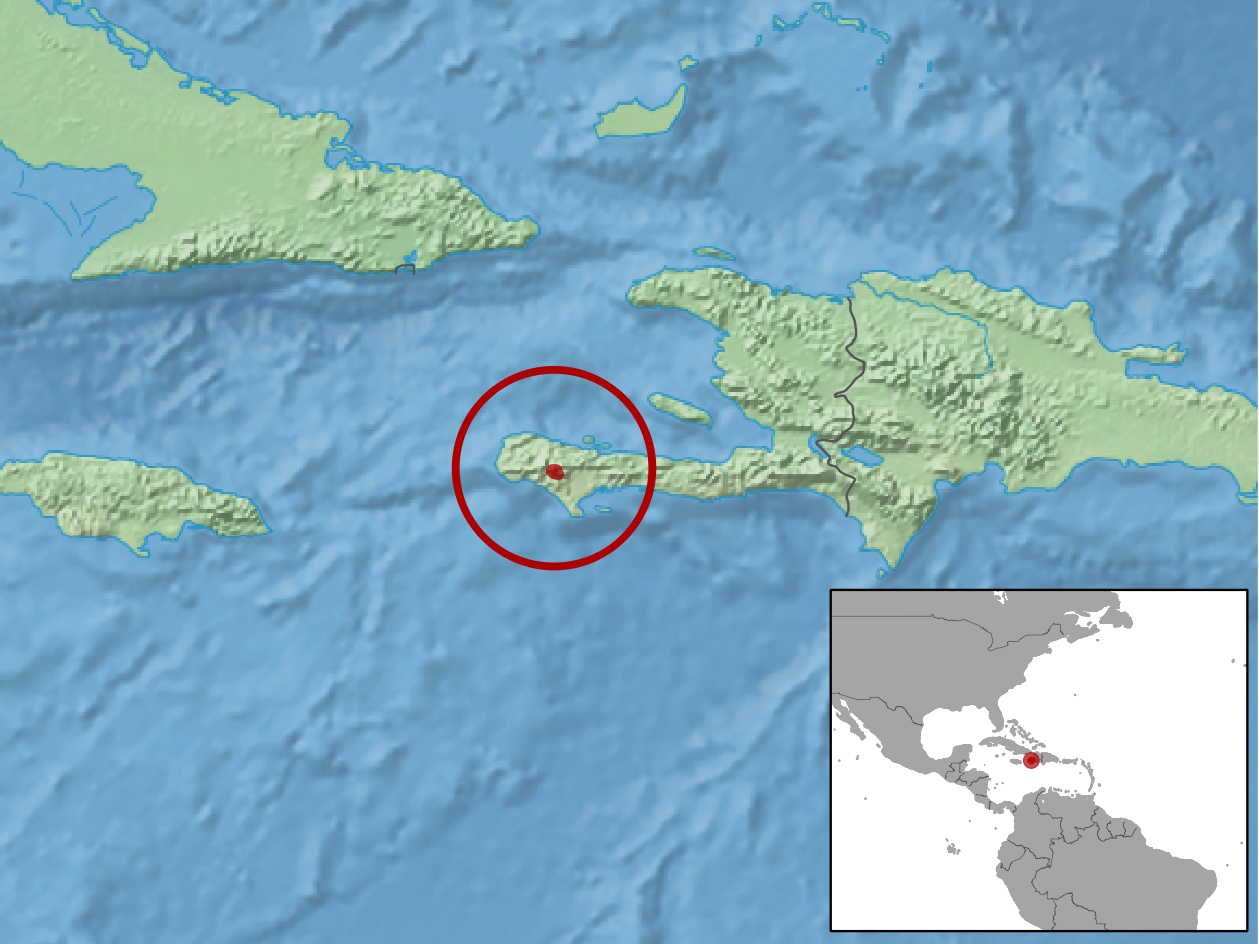

Species of amphibian

Eleutherodactylus thorectes (common names: Morne Macay robber frog, Macaya breast-spot frog) is a species of frog in the family Eleutherodactylidae. It is endemic to Haiti and known from the Massif de la Hotte at high elevations. Specifically, it is known from Pic Macaya and Pic Formon at elevations of 1,700–2,340 m (5,580–7,680 ft) asl. Its natural habitats are closed pine montane forest and cloud forest with shrubs, tree ferns, bromeliads, and climbing bamboo. With a snout-vent length of 12–15 mm, this slightly arboreal species is one of the smallest of the world's frogs. It is threatened by habitat loss caused by charcoal logging and agriculture. It is known from the Pic Macaya National Park, but habitat degradation is occurring in the park too.
