= Eleutherodactylus glaphycompus =

Conservation status
- Endangered (IUCN 3.1)

Scientific classification
- Kingdom: Animalia
- Phylum: Chordata
- Class: Amphibia
- Order: Anura
- Clade: Brachycephaloidea
- Family: Eleutherodactylidae
- Genus: Eleutherodactylus
- Species: E. glaphycompus

Binomial name
- Eleutherodactylus glaphycompus Schwartz, 1973

Species of frog

Eleutherodactylus glaphycompus is a species of frog in the family Eleutherodactylidae endemic to the Tiburon Peninsula, Haiti. Its common name is Southwest Haiti robber frog. The specific name glaphycompus refers to its microhabitat, fissures and crevices in limestone rock.

== Description ==
Males measure 16–19 mm (0.63–0.75 in) and females 24–29 mm (0.94–1.14 in) in snout–vent length. Dorsum is green on pale green/yellowish/greenish yellow background. Venter is pale yellowish to whitish; throat is variously stippled or mottled with gray to black.

Males can call from rock crevices both day and night. The call has been described as "somewhat like two ball-bearings clicking together but lacks the metallic quality and is explosive in nature."

== Habitat and conservation ==
The species' natural habitat is crevices of exposed limestone in closed moist forest at elevations of 576–1,480 m (1,890–4,856 ft) asl. It is moderately common in suitable habitat, but threatened by habitat loss (but perhaps less so than other frogs). The species occurs in the Pic Macaya National Park, but there is no active management for conservation, and the habitat loss continues also in the park.
