= South Island telegraph frog =

Conservation status
- Vulnerable (IUCN 3.1)

Scientific classification
- Kingdom: Animalia
- Phylum: Chordata
- Class: Amphibia
- Order: Anura
- Family: Eleutherodactylidae
- Genus: Eleutherodactylus
- Species: E. audanti

Binomial name
- Eleutherodactylus audanti Cochran, 1934

Synonyms
- Eleutherodactylus neodreptus Schwartz, 1965

Species of amphibian

South Island telegraph frog (Eleutherodactylus audanti) is a species of frog in the family Eleutherodactylidae endemic to Hispaniola. It occurs in the Massif de la Hotte and Massif de la Selle, Haiti, and in the Sierra de Baoruco in the Dominican Republic.

== Etymology ==
The specific name audanti honors Mr. André Audant, a Haitian entomologist who, together with Thomas Barbour, collected the holotype .

== Habitat and conservation ==
The species' natural habitats are upland closed-canopy forest and forest edges where it is found under rocks and debris. It is a moderately common species in suitable habitat but threatened by habitat loss.
