= Eleutherodactylus patriciae =

Conservation status
- Endangered (IUCN 3.1)

Scientific classification
- Kingdom: Animalia
- Phylum: Chordata
- Class: Amphibia
- Order: Anura
- Clade: Brachycephaloidea
- Family: Eleutherodactylidae
- Genus: Eleutherodactylus
- Species: E. patriciae

Binomial name
- Eleutherodactylus patriciae Schwartz, 1965 "1964"

Species of frog

Eleutherodactylus patriciae is a species of frog in the family Eleutherodactylidae endemic to the Cordillera Central, Dominican Republic, at elevations of 2,000–3,050 m (6,560–10,010 ft) asl. Its natural habitats are closed upland forest and forest remnants. It is threatened by habitat loss caused by agriculture and by disturbance from ecotourism. Also chytridiomycosis is a threat.
