= Eleutherodactylus amadeus =

Conservation status
- Critically Endangered (IUCN 3.1)

Scientific classification
- Kingdom: Animalia
- Phylum: Chordata
- Class: Amphibia
- Order: Anura
- Family: Eleutherodactylidae
- Genus: Eleutherodactylus
- Subgenus: Euhyas
- Species: E. amadeus

Binomial name
- Eleutherodactylus amadeus Hedges, Thomas, and Franz, 1987

Species of amphibian

Eleutherodactylus amadeus, also known as Mozart's frog or Haitian robber frog, is a species of frog in the family Eleutherodactylidae. It is endemic to the Massif de la Hotte, southwestern Haiti. After not having been seen after 1991, the species was reported again in 2011.

== Etymology ==
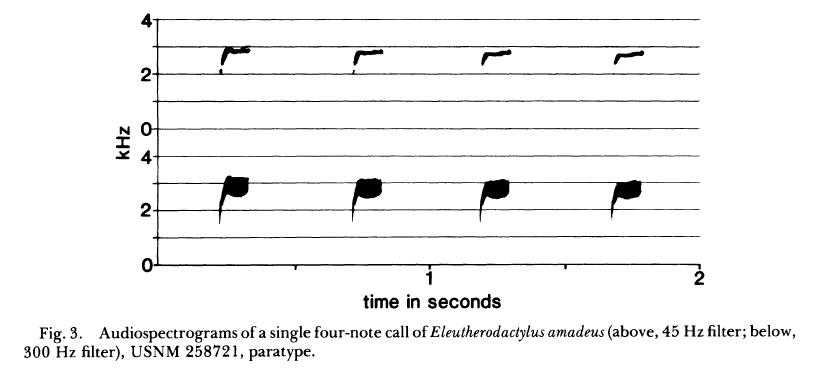
Audiospectrogram of a single four-note call

Eleutherodactylus amadeus is named after the composer Wolfgang Amadeus Mozart "for the remarkable resemblance of the wide-band audiospectrogram of this species to musical notes."

== Description ==
Eleutherodactylus amadeus is only known from the Massif de la Hotte (marker) at 1,000–2,340m ASL

Males measure on average 18.7 mm (0.74 in) and females 23.4 mm (0.92 in) in snout–vent length. The maximum length is 25 mm (0.98 in). The dorsum is smooth. The dorsal pattern is variable; the most common patterns are reverse parentheses [")("], unpatterned, and narrow middorsal stripe combined with long dorsolateral stripes.

== Reproduction ==
Male advertisement call is a single four-note call, emitted from low herbaceous vegetation or from the ground. Similar two-note calls have been heard in late afternoon and early evening, although there is no certainty that they belong to this species. After darkness, only four-note calls are heard. Egg cluster have been found under objects on the ground. Clutch size is 11–12; egg clusters might contain eggs from more than one female. The development is direct (i.e., without free-living tadpole stage). The hatchlings measure 4.2–4.4 mm (0.17–0.17 in).

== Habitat and conservation ==
Its natural habitat is closed-canopy forest at elevations of 1,000–2,340 m (3,280–7,680 ft) above sea level. In daytime they hide under rocks and logs. Males can be heard calling in the early evening from low herbaceous vegetation.

It is threatened by habitat loss, primarily caused by logging (for charcoaling) and slash-and-burn agriculture. It occurs in the Pic Macaya National Park. However, there is no active management for conservation, and habitat loss continues in the park. After not having been seen after 1991, the species was rediscovered during an expedition that was part of the Conservation International's global search for "lost frogs". The finding was announced in early 2011.

== See also ==
- List of organisms named after famous people (born before 1800)
