= Eleutherodactylus wetmorei =

Conservation status
- Vulnerable (IUCN 3.1)

Scientific classification
- Kingdom: Animalia
- Phylum: Chordata
- Class: Amphibia
- Order: Anura
- Family: Eleutherodactylidae
- Genus: Eleutherodactylus
- Subgenus: Eleutherodactylus
- Species: E. wetmorei

Binomial name
- Eleutherodactylus wetmorei Cochran, 1932

Species of frog

Eleutherodactylus wetmorei is a species of frog in the family Eleutherodactylidae.

== Distribution and habitat ==
It is endemic to Hispaniola and occurs in both the Dominican Republic and Haiti. Specifically, it occurs on the Tiburon Peninsula (Haiti) and east to the Massif de la Selle in the southwestern Dominican Republic, and on the Massif du Nord in north-central Haiti east to west-central Dominican Republic. Its natural habitat is mesic broadleaf forest.

== Behaviour ==
It is an arboreal species occurring bromeliads and other plants, and also in leaf axils of bananas plantations. Eggs are laid in bromeliads.

== Conservation ==
It is threatened by habitat loss caused by logging and agriculture. It is known from several protected areas, but most of them are in need of better management.
