= Short-nosed green frog =

Conservation status
- Critically Endangered (IUCN 3.1)

Scientific classification
- Kingdom: Animalia
- Phylum: Chordata
- Class: Amphibia
- Order: Anura
- Family: Eleutherodactylidae
- Genus: Eleutherodactylus
- Subgenus: Euhyas
- Species: E. brevirostris

Binomial name
- Eleutherodactylus brevirostris Shreve, 1936

Species of amphibian

The short-nosed green frog or shortsnout robber frog (Eleutherodactylus brevirostris) is a species of frog in the family Eleutherodactylidae endemic to the Massif de la Hotte, Haiti. Its natural habitat is dwarf cloud forest, although it can also be found in clearings. It is found under ground cover, and the eggs are laid on the ground. It is threatened by habitat loss; while the species occurs in the Pic Macaya National Park, there is no active management for conservation, and the habitat loss continues in the park.
