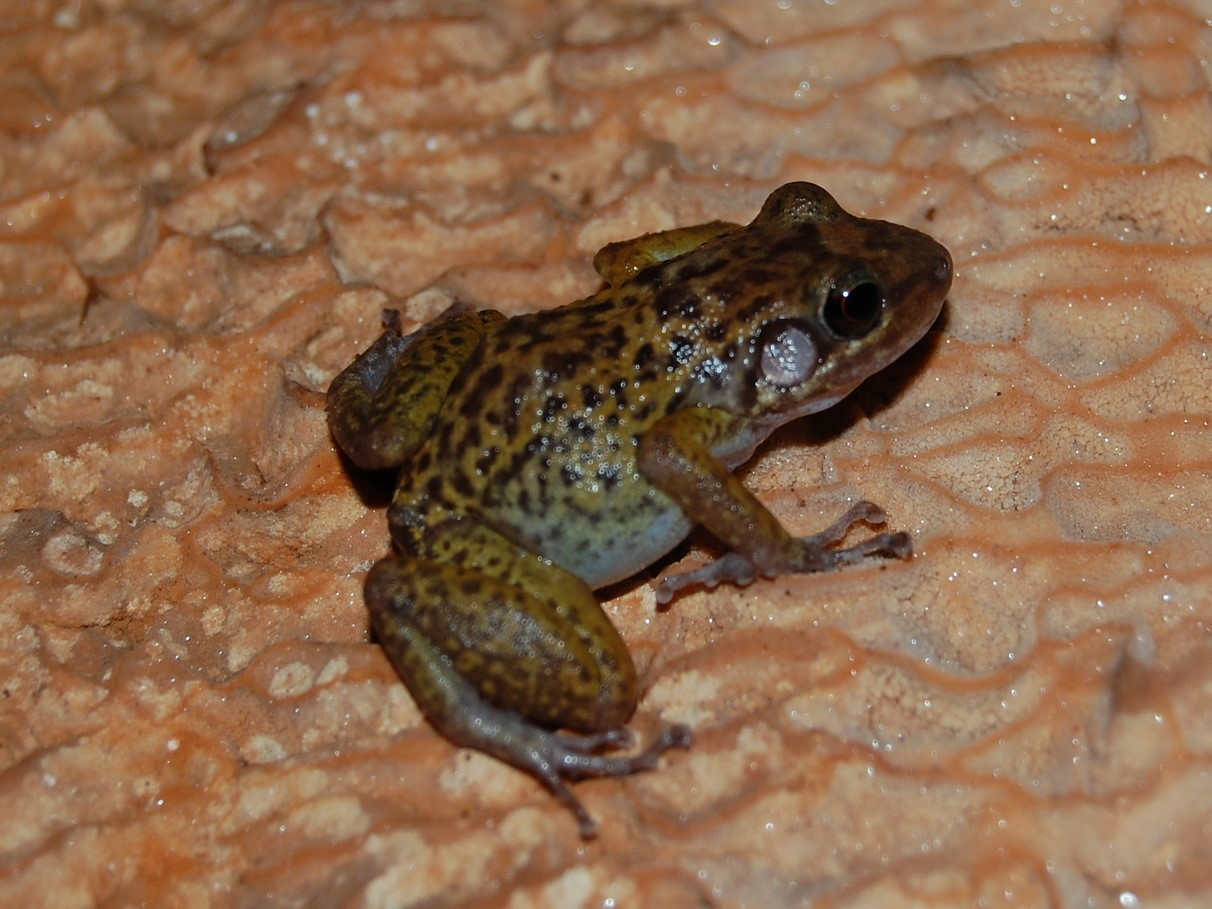

Conservation status
- Least Concern (IUCN 3.1)

Scientific classification
- Kingdom: Animalia
- Phylum: Chordata
- Class: Amphibia
- Order: Anura
- Family: Eleutherodactylidae
- Genus: Eleutherodactylus
- Species: E. alcoae

Binomial name
- Eleutherodactylus alcoae Schwartz, 1971

= Barahona rock frog =

Species of amphibian

The Barahona rock frog (Eleutherodactylus alcoae), or Hispaniola dwarf robber frog, is a species of frogs in the family Eleutherodactylidae that is endemic to southern Hispaniola.

== Distribution and habitat ==
It is found on the Barahona Peninsula of the Dominican Republic and immediately adjacent coastal area in Haiti. Its natural habitat is dry scrub forest; by day it retreats into caves and rock crevices.

== Conservation ==
This frog is common in suitable habitat, but it is only known from three locations threatened by habitat loss. It occurs with the Jaragua National Park and Sierra de Bahoruco National Park, but significant habitat destruction occurs within these parks.
