= Half-stripe bromeliad frog =

Conservation status
- Vulnerable (IUCN 3.1)

Scientific classification
- Kingdom: Animalia
- Phylum: Chordata
- Class: Amphibia
- Order: Anura
- Clade: Brachycephaloidea
- Family: Eleutherodactylidae
- Genus: Eleutherodactylus
- Species: E. heminota

Binomial name
- Eleutherodactylus heminota Shreve & Williams, 1963

Synonyms
- Eleutherodactylus bakeri heminota Shreve & Williams, 1963; Euhyas heminota (Shreve & Williams, 1963)

Species of amphibian

The half-stripe bromeliad frog (Eleutherodactylus heminota), also called Shreve's robber frog, is a species of frog in the family Eleutherodactylidae endemic to Hispaniola and found in both the Dominican Republic and Haiti. Its natural habitats are subtropical or tropical moist lowland forest and subtropical or tropical moist montane forest. It is threatened by habitat loss.
