= Eleutherodactylus ventrilineatus =

Conservation status
- Critically Endangered (IUCN 3.1)

Scientific classification
- Kingdom: Animalia
- Phylum: Chordata
- Class: Amphibia
- Order: Anura
- Family: Eleutherodactylidae
- Genus: Eleutherodactylus
- Subgenus: Euhyas
- Species: E. ventrilineatus

Binomial name
- Eleutherodactylus ventrilineatus (Shreve, 1936)

Synonyms
- Leptodactylus ventrilineatus Shreve, 1936

Species of frog

Eleutherodactylus ventrilineatus is a species of frog in the family Eleutherodactylidae. It is endemic to Haiti and only known from the Pic Macaya and Pic Formon (Massif de la Hotte) at elevations of 1,700–2,340 m (5,580–7,680 ft) asl. Its natural habitats are open areas in montane closed pine and cloud forests. It is threatened by habitat loss caused by logging and agriculture. It is known from the Pic Macaya National Park, but habitat degradation is occurring in the park too.
