= Eleutherodactylus diplasius =

Conservation status
- Critically Endangered (IUCN 3.1)

Scientific classification
- Kingdom: Animalia
- Phylum: Chordata
- Class: Amphibia
- Order: Anura
- Family: Eleutherodactylidae
- Genus: Eleutherodactylus
- Subgenus: Eleutherodactylus
- Species: E. diplasius

Binomial name
- Eleutherodactylus diplasius Schwartz, 1973

Synonyms
- Eleutherodactylus wetmorei williamsi Schwartz, 1968; Eleutherodactylus wetmorei diplasius Schwartz, 1973

Species of amphibian

Eleutherodactylus diplasius, the patternless whistling frog, is a species of frog in the family Eleutherodactylidae. A native of Haiti, it can be found in the Tiburon Peninsula northwest, to the Massif de la Hotte. It has an estimated polygon range of about 814 km^{2} (314 sq mi), spanning an elevational range of up to 1,207 m (3,960 ft) asl. In July 2011 it was found in at Morne Deux Mamelles.
