= Eleutherodactylus warreni =

Conservation status
- Critically Endangered (IUCN 3.1)

Scientific classification
- Kingdom: Animalia
- Phylum: Chordata
- Class: Amphibia
- Order: Anura
- Clade: Brachycephaloidea
- Family: Eleutherodactylidae
- Genus: Eleutherodactylus
- Species: E. warreni

Binomial name
- Eleutherodactylus warreni Schwartz, 1976

Species of amphibian

Eleutherodactylus warreni is a species of frogs in the family Eleutherodactylidae. It is endemic to the island of Tortuga off the northwestern coast of Haiti. Its natural habitat is xeric hardwood forest at an elevation of about 400 m (1,300 ft) asl. It is a terrestrial frog occurring on rocks and in leaf litter. It is threatened by habitat loss caused by logging and agriculture.
