= Eleutherodactylus paralius =

Conservation status
- Near Threatened (IUCN 3.1)

Scientific classification
- Kingdom: Animalia
- Phylum: Chordata
- Class: Amphibia
- Order: Anura
- Clade: Brachycephaloidea
- Family: Eleutherodactylidae
- Genus: Eleutherodactylus
- Species: E. paralius

Binomial name
- Eleutherodactylus paralius Schwartz, 1976

Species of frog

Eleutherodactylus paralius, commonly known as the coastal red-rumped frog, is a species of frog in the family Eleutherodactylidae. It is endemic to the Dominican Republic, specifically the southeastern region.

== Taxonomy and systematics ==
The species was first described by Schwartz in 1976 and is part of the Eleutherodactylus (Euhyas) ricordii species series and the Eleutherodactylus lentus species group.

Originally described as a subspecies of Eleutherodactylus weinlandi, E. paralius was later elevated to species status. This taxonomic revision was based on studies by Hedges, Duellman, and Heinicke in 2008. The species belongs to the subgenus Euhyas within the genus Eleutherodactylus.

== Description ==
Detailed morphological descriptions of Eleutherodactylus paralius are limited. However, members of the genus Eleutherodactylus are generally small to medium-sized frogs with direct development, bypassing the tadpole stage.

== Distribution and habitat ==
Eleutherodactylus paralius is a natural resident of the Dominican Republic and is not found in any other region. It is known to inhabit the southeastern part of the country, from Santo Domingo to La Romana Province. The species is terrestrial and has been found in various mesic habitats, including forests, caves, and even disturbed environments like plantations and urban areas.

== Conservation status ==
As of 2020, the IUCN Red List categorizes Eleutherodactylus paralius as Near Threatened under criteria B1ab(iii). The species faces threats from habitat loss due to agricultural expansion, urbanization, and tourism development. Climate change effects, particularly changes in precipitation patterns and sea level rise, are also potential threats. Despite these challenges, E. paralius has shown some adaptability to disturbed environments.

== Ecology and behavior ==
Eleutherodactylus paralius is known to breed by direct development, where eggs hatch directly into miniature versions of adult frogs.
