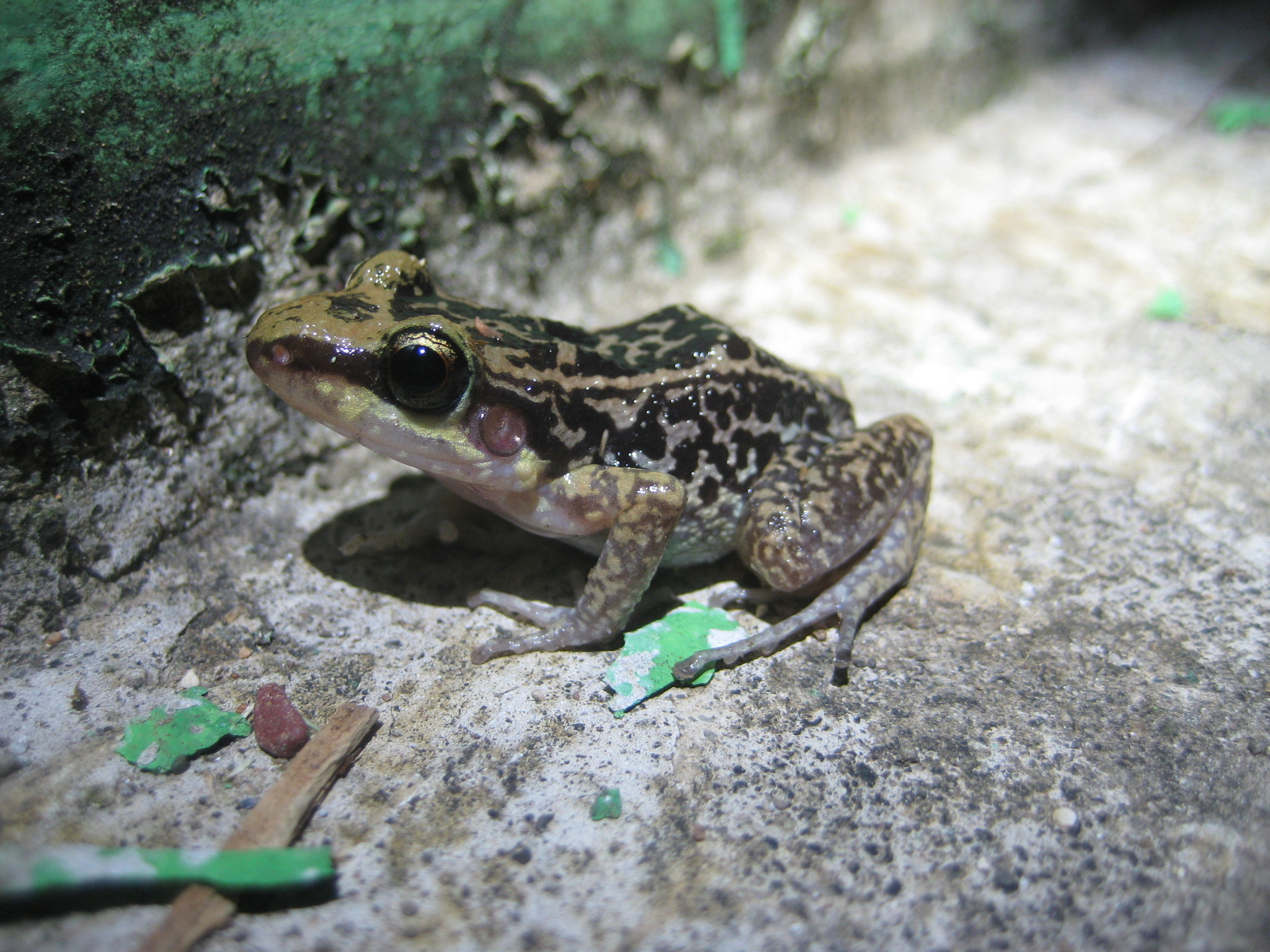

Conservation status
- Least Concern (IUCN 3.1)

Scientific classification
- Kingdom: Animalia
- Phylum: Chordata
- Class: Amphibia
- Order: Anura
- Clade: Brachycephaloidea
- Family: Eleutherodactylidae
- Genus: Eleutherodactylus
- Species: E. pictissimus

Binomial name
- Eleutherodactylus pictissimus Cochran, 1935

= Hispaniolan yellow-mottled frog =

Species of amphibian

The Hispaniolan yellow-mottled frog or painted robber frog (Eleutherodactylus pictissimus) is a species of frog in the family Eleutherodactylidae endemic to Hispaniola and found in both the Dominican Republic and Haiti. Its natural habitats are dry scrub forest, mesic broadleaf forest, and secondary forest. It is a terrestrial frog that lays its eggs on the ground. It is threatened by habitat loss.
