= Eleutherodactylus schmidti =

Conservation status
- Critically endangered, possibly extinct (IUCN 3.1)

Scientific classification
- Kingdom: Animalia
- Phylum: Chordata
- Class: Amphibia
- Order: Anura
- Clade: Brachycephaloidea
- Family: Eleutherodactylidae
- Genus: Eleutherodactylus
- Species: E. schmidti

Binomial name
- Eleutherodactylus schmidti Noble, 1923

Species of amphibian

Eleutherodactylus schmidti is a species of frog in the family Eleutherodactylidae endemic to Hispaniola, and found in both the Dominican Republic and Haiti. It is sometimes referred to as the Schmidt's robber frog. It is named in honour of Karl Patterson Schmidt.

== Habitat ==
Its natural habitat is mesic closed-canopy rainforest where it is usually found beside streams.

== Conservation ==
It is threatened by habitat loss, and considered Critically Endangered or possibly extinct.
