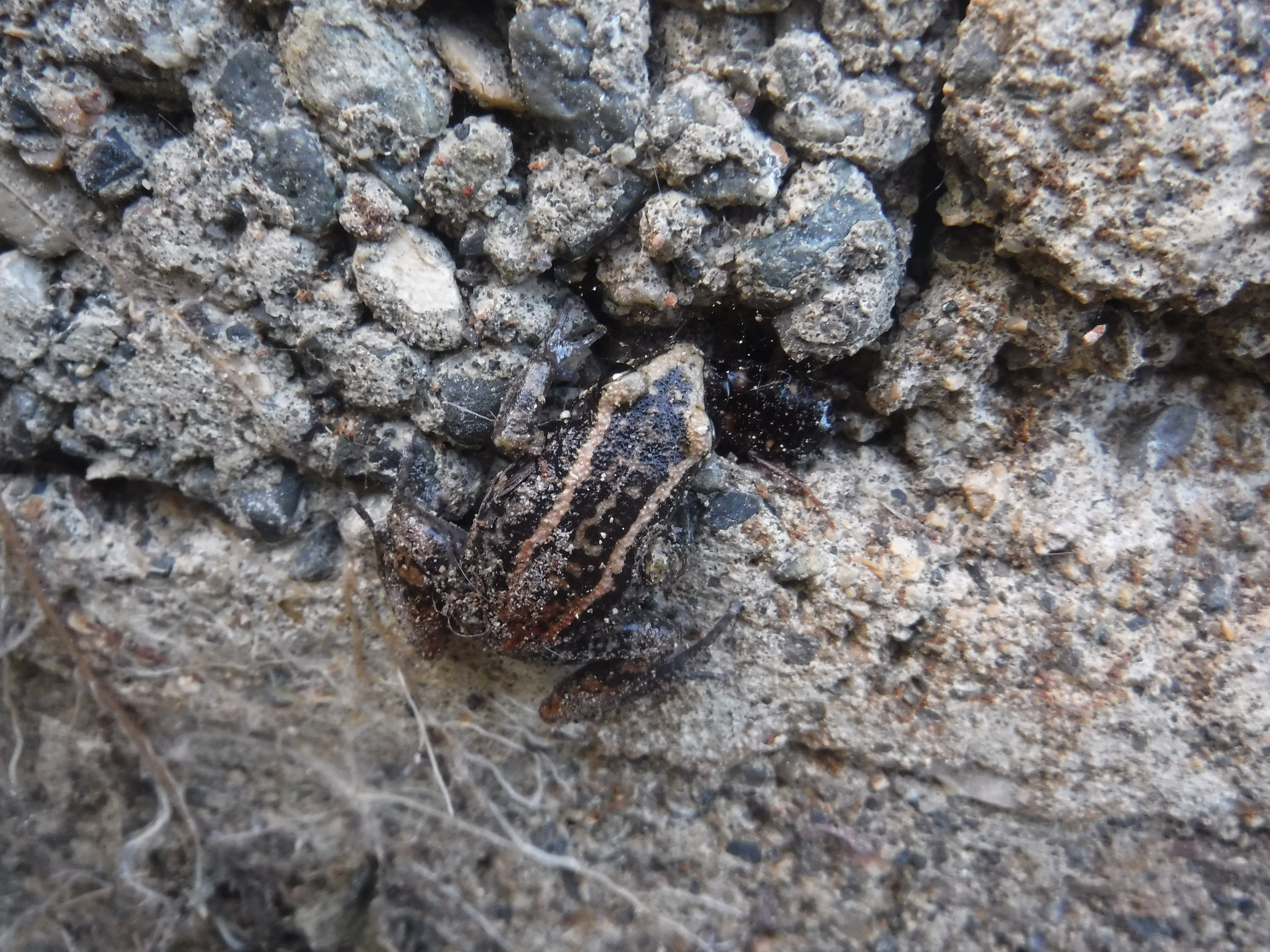

Conservation status
- Least Concern (IUCN 3.1)

Scientific classification
- Kingdom: Animalia
- Phylum: Chordata
- Class: Amphibia
- Order: Anura
- Family: Eleutherodactylidae
- Genus: Eleutherodactylus
- Subgenus: Euhyas
- Species: E. weinlandi

Binomial name
- Eleutherodactylus weinlandi Barbour, 1914

= Eleutherodactylus weinlandi =

Species of frog

Eleutherodactylus weinlandi is a species of frog in the family Eleutherodactylidae endemic to eastern Hispaniola; it is found in the Dominican Republic and central Haiti. It is a common, terrestrial frog that occurs in a range of mesic habitats: plantations, woods, gardens, ravines, and even trash piles in urban areas.
