= Eleutherodactylus aporostegus =

Scientific classification
- Kingdom: Animalia
- Phylum: Chordata
- Class: Amphibia
- Order: Anura
- Clade: Brachycephaloidea
- Family: Eleutherodactylidae
- Genus: Eleutherodactylus
- Species: E. aporostegus

Binomial name
- Eleutherodactylus aporostegus Schwartz, 1965

Synonyms
- Eleutherodactylus ruthae aporostegus Schwartz, 1965

Species of amphibian

Eleutherodactylus aporostegus (commonly known as the Tiburon burrowing frog) is a species of frog in the family Eleutherodactylidae. It was originally described as subspecies of Eleutherodactylus ruthae, but has been formally recognized as a full species since 2008. It is endemic to the Tiburon Peninsula, Haiti.

Eleutherodactylus aporostegus burrows and lays its eggs underground, which is unusual among Eleutherodactylus.
