= Baoruco hammer frog =

Conservation status
- Endangered (IUCN 3.1)

Scientific classification
- Kingdom: Animalia
- Phylum: Chordata
- Class: Amphibia
- Order: Anura
- Clade: Brachycephaloidea
- Family: Eleutherodactylidae
- Genus: Eleutherodactylus
- Species: E. armstrongi

Binomial name
- Eleutherodactylus armstrongi Noble & Hassler, 1933

Species of amphibian

The Baoruco hammer frog (Eleutherodactylus armstrongi) is a species of frog in the family Eleutherodactylidae found in the Dominican Republic and Haiti. Its natural habitats are subtropical or tropical moist lowland forest and subtropical or tropical moist montane forest. It is threatened by habitat loss.
