= Eleutherodactylus poolei =

Conservation status
- Critically Endangered (IUCN 3.1)

Scientific classification
- Kingdom: Animalia
- Phylum: Chordata
- Class: Amphibia
- Order: Anura
- Family: Eleutherodactylidae
- Genus: Eleutherodactylus
- Subgenus: Eleutherodactylus
- Species: E. poolei

Binomial name
- Eleutherodactylus poolei Cochran, 1938

Species of frog

Eleutherodactylus poolei is a species of frog in the family Eleutherodactylidae. It is endemic to Nord, Haiti, where it is only known from the Citadelle Laferrière, and possibly from nearby Carrefour Marmelade. It was found in a moist dungeon of the Citadelle Laferrière and was last recorded in 1985. It probably occurs in the surrounding forest. Habitat loss caused by logging and agriculture is threat to this species. The fort itself is a World Heritage Site.
