= Eleutherodactylus lucioi =

Conservation status
- Critically Endangered (IUCN 3.1)

Scientific classification
- Kingdom: Animalia
- Phylum: Chordata
- Class: Amphibia
- Order: Anura
- Family: Eleutherodactylidae
- Genus: Eleutherodactylus
- Subgenus: Euhyas
- Species: E. lucioi

Binomial name
- Eleutherodactylus lucioi Schwartz, 1980

Synonyms
- Euhyas lucioi (Schwartz, 1980)

Species of frog

Eleutherodactylus lucioi (common name: St. Nicholas robber frog) is a species of frog in the family Eleutherodactylidae. It is endemic to Haiti, where it is only known from a single specimen collected near Môle-Saint-Nicolas in Nord-Ouest department.

== Etymology ==
The specific name lucioi honors John C. Lucio, one of the companions of Albert Schwartz when he was collecting near Port-de-Paix.

== Description ==
The holotype and the only known specimen of this species is (presumably) an adult male measuring 23.6 mm (0.93 in) in snout–vent length. The snout is more or less acuminate. The tympanum is visible but much less than the eye in diameter. The fingers and toes have no webbing but bear small discs. Skin is smooth or very weakly tuberculate. The dorsum is golden brown and with only vague gray patterning and a black to dark gray canthal line. The hind limbs are very pale pink. The concealed surfaces are vaguely marbled with medium gray. The venter is white.

Eleutherodactylus lucioi is only known from near Môle-Saint-Nicolas, Haiti

== Habitat and conservation ==
The single specimen was recorded in a rocky ravine in remnant riparian forest at around 100 m (330 ft) above sea level, on a rock projecting from the stream bank. It has not been recorded after it was first collected (in 1979), despite at least one survey at the type locality in 1997. Habitat loss caused by logging and agriculture is threat to this species, and it is not known whether it survives.
