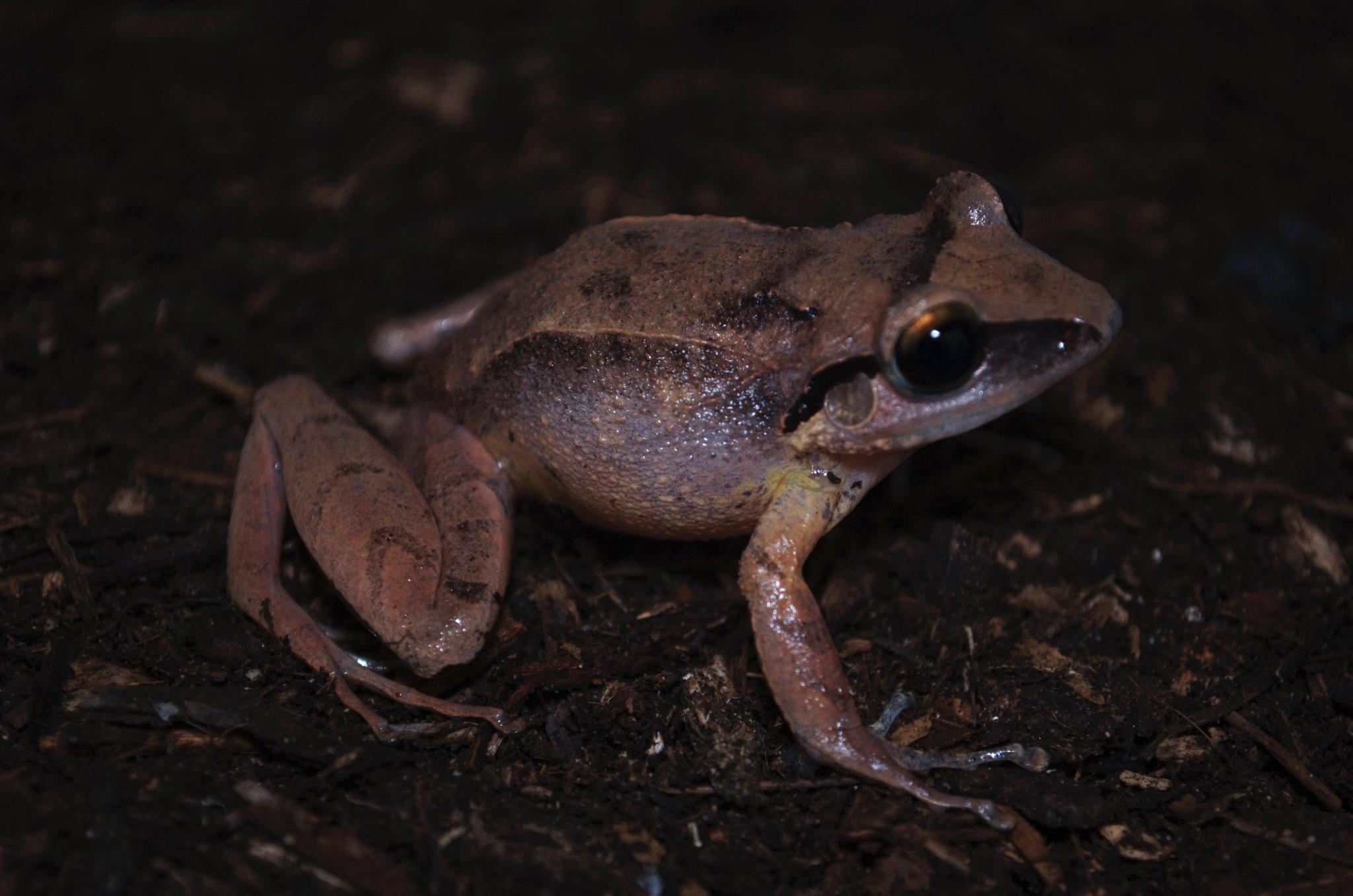

Conservation status
- Endangered (IUCN 3.1)

Scientific classification
- Kingdom: Animalia
- Phylum: Chordata
- Class: Amphibia
- Order: Anura
- Family: Eleutherodactylidae
- Genus: Eleutherodactylus
- Species: E. ruthae

Binomial name
- Eleutherodactylus ruthae Noble, 1923

= Eleutherodactylus ruthae =

Species of frog

Eleutherodactylus ruthae (common name: Ruth's robber frog) is a species of frog in the family Eleutherodactylidae. It is endemic to Hispaniola and known from scattered locations in both Haiti and the Dominican Republic. It was described by Gladwyn Kingsley Noble, who named it in honour of his wife, Ruth Crosby Noble; she also first discovered the species. It might represent more than one species. Eleutherodactylus aporostegus, Eleutherodactylus bothroboans, Eleutherodactylus tychaethrous were first described as subspecies of Eleutherodactylus ruthae, but have later been elevated to full species status.

== Description ==
The holotype, an adult male, measured 49 mm (1.9 in) in snout–vent length. The snout is distinctly shovel-shaped. Dorsum is spotted. Skin is glandular and finely warty above, with best developed warts on sides of body.

== Habitat and conservation ==
The natural habitats of Eleutherodactylus ruthae are xeric pine forest and mesic forest. Its altitudinal range is from sea level 900 m (3,000 ft) asl. Males call from closed underground chambers where the eggs are also laid.

This rarely encountered frog is believed to be declining. It is threatened by habitat loss caused by logging and agriculture. However, it has declined even in suitable habitats, and factors such as invasive predators, climate change, and chytridiomycosis might also play a role.
