= Eleutherodactylus grahami =

Conservation status
- Endangered (IUCN 3.1)

Scientific classification
- Kingdom: Animalia
- Phylum: Chordata
- Class: Amphibia
- Order: Anura
- Clade: Brachycephaloidea
- Family: Eleutherodactylidae
- Genus: Eleutherodactylus
- Species: E. grahami

Binomial name
- Eleutherodactylus grahami Schwartz, 1979

Species of frog

Eleutherodactylus grahami is a species of frog in the family Eleutherodactylidae. It is endemic to Artibonite, Haiti, the northwestern region of the country. Its common name is Graham's robber frog.

Eleutherodactylus grahami occurs on limestone ridges with boulders and xerophytic vegetation at elevations of 20–330 m (66–1,083 ft) asl. It is moderately common in suitable habitat, but threatened by extreme habitat loss caused by charcoaling and small-scale agriculture; only pockets of suitable habitat remain.
