= Baoruco burrowing frog =

Conservation status
- Endangered (IUCN 3.1)

Scientific classification
- Kingdom: Animalia
- Phylum: Chordata
- Class: Amphibia
- Order: Anura
- Clade: Brachycephaloidea
- Family: Eleutherodactylidae
- Genus: Eleutherodactylus
- Species: E. hypostenor

Binomial name
- Eleutherodactylus hypostenor Schwartz, 1965

Synonyms
- Pelorius hypostenor (Schwartz, 1965)

Species of amphibian

The Baoruco burrowing frog (Eleutherodactylus hypostenor), or Cabral robber frog, is a species of frog in the family Eleutherodactylidae. It is endemic to Hispaniola where it lives on the Tiburon Peninsula, Haiti and eastward to the Baoruco Mountain Range, Dominican Republic. Its natural habitat is closed mesic broadleaf forest, but it can also occur at shade-grown coffee and cacao plantations. It is a burrowing species. Males call from constructed underground chambers; also the eggs are laid underground. threatened by habitat loss, even within the Sierra de Bahoruco National Park.
