= Eleutherodactylus sciagraphus =

Conservation status
- Critically Endangered (IUCN 3.1)

Scientific classification
- Kingdom: Animalia
- Phylum: Chordata
- Class: Amphibia
- Order: Anura
- Family: Eleutherodactylidae
- Genus: Eleutherodactylus
- Species: E. sciagraphus

Binomial name
- Eleutherodactylus sciagraphus Schwartz, 1973

Species of frog

Eleutherodactylus sciagraphus is a species of frog in the family Eleutherodactylidae. It is endemic to Haiti and only known from near its type locality at an elevation of 1,060–1,080 m (3,480–3,540 ft) asl in the Massif de la Hotte. Its specific name refers to its heavily barred hindlimbs. Its common name is Sud robber frog.

== Description ==
Males measure 15–17 mm (0.59–0.67 in) and females 18–21 mm (0.71–0.83 in) in snout–vent length. Dorsum is greenish to gray to unicolor dark brown. Venter is white or yellowish with dark gray to black markings in many individuals. Hindlimbs are banded with many primary bars and prominent shadow bars.

== Habitat and conservation ==
This rare species was last recorded in 1984. Its natural habitat is closed moist forest where it occurs under rocks. It is threatened by habitat loss occurring in the area and not known from any protected area.
