= Eleutherodactylus rhodesi =

Conservation status
- Critically Endangered (IUCN 3.1)

Scientific classification
- Kingdom: Animalia
- Phylum: Chordata
- Class: Amphibia
- Order: Anura
- Family: Eleutherodactylidae
- Genus: Eleutherodactylus
- Subgenus: Euhyas
- Species: E. rhodesi

Binomial name
- Eleutherodactylus rhodesi Schwartz, 1980

Synonyms
- Euhyas rhodesi (Schwartz, 1980)

Species of frog

Eleutherodactylus rhodesi (common name: Rhodes' robber frog) is a species of frog in the family Eleutherodactylidae. It is endemic to Haiti, where it is only known from the area of its type locality on northeastern base of the Presqu'ile du Nord-Ouest, near Port-de-Paix, Nord-Ouest department.

== Etymology ==
The specific name rhodesi honors S. Craig Rhodes, one of the companions of Albert Schwartz when he was collecting near Port-de-Paix.

== Description ==
The type series consists of three juveniles measuring 12–20 mm (0.47–0.79 in), an adult male measuring 26 mm (1.0 in), and two adult females measuring 23 and 30 mm (0.91 and 1.18 in) in snout–vent length. The snout is truncate. The tympanum is visible. The fingers and toes have no webbing and lack discs. Skin is smooth. The dorsum is olive, overlaid with dark gray to black markings. The concealed surfaces are pale gray with black bars. The iris is bronze above and brownish red below.

Eleutherodactylus rhodesi is only known from near Port-de-Paix, Haiti

== Habitat and conservation ==
Eleutherodactylus rhodesi have been found in leaf-litter and under rocks in forest at around 30 m (98 ft) above sea level. Most types were found under trash in a mesic Musa grove. The species is moderately common in suitable habitat, but its known range is very restricted. Habitat loss caused by logging and agriculture is the main threat to this species.
