= Peltophryne guentheri =

Conservation status
- Least Concern (IUCN 3.1)

Scientific classification
- Kingdom: Animalia
- Phylum: Chordata
- Class: Amphibia
- Order: Anura
- Family: Bufonidae
- Genus: Peltophryne
- Species: P. guentheri

Binomial name
- Peltophryne guentheri (Cochran, 1941)

Synonyms
- Bufo guentheri Cochran, 1941; Bufo fractus (Schwartz, 1972); Peltophryne fracta Schwartz, 1972

Species of amphibian

Peltophryne guentheri, the southern crested toad or Gunther's Caribbean toad, is a species of toad in the family Bufonidae. It is endemic to Hispaniola and found in the lowlands of Haiti and the Dominican Republic.

== Description ==
Males grow to 74 mm (2.9 in) and females to 101 mm (4.0 in) in snout–vent length. The dorsum has a yellowish tan ground color and is heavily overlaid with a very dark brown to black reticulated pattern.

== Habitat and ecology ==
Natural habitats of Peltophryne guentheri are dry lowland valleys in both mesic and xeric areas. These frogs have been observed to sit on or near piles of cattle manure. They appear to use a sit-and-wait foraging strategy to catch insects on the manure.

Breeding takes place in temporary pools, including a rainwater-filled roadside ditch. Breeding is triggered by heavy rains, and the breeding season corresponds to the Atlantic hurricane season.

== Conservation ==
It is threatened by habitat loss caused by livestock grazing and selective logging, and by agricultural pollution. All observations of these animals are from degraded habitats where the populations are facing further habitat degradation caused by urban development. A further threat is competition with and predation from introduced cane toads (Rhinella marina) and American bullfrogs (Lithobates catesbeianus). Males have also been observed attempting to mate with a male Rhinella marina.
