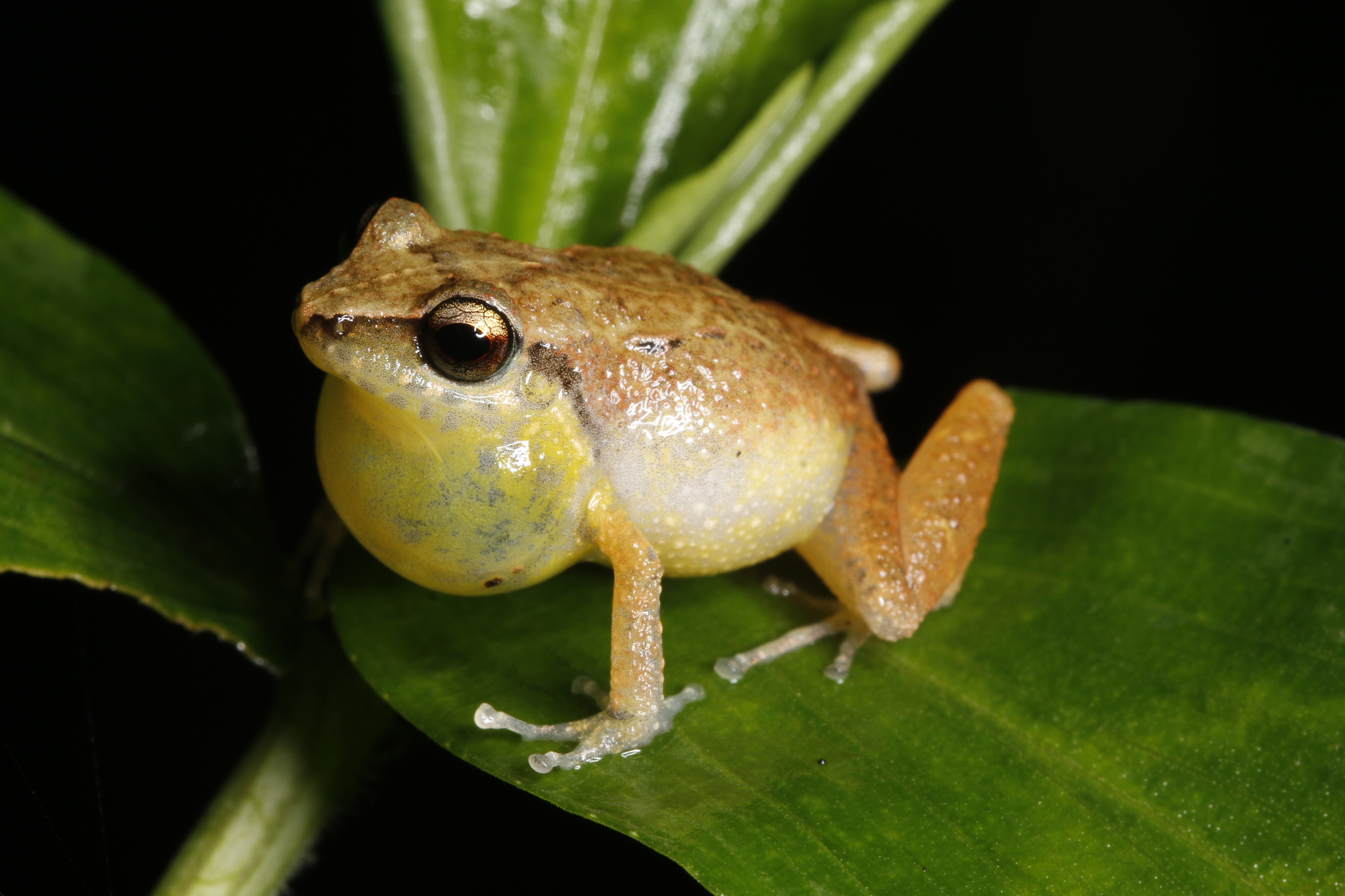

Conservation status
- Least Concern (IUCN 3.1)

Scientific classification
- Kingdom: Animalia
- Phylum: Chordata
- Class: Amphibia
- Order: Anura
- Family: Eleutherodactylidae
- Genus: Eleutherodactylus
- Species: E. abbotti

Binomial name
- Eleutherodactylus abbotti Cochran, 1923

= Eleutherodactylus abbotti =

Species of frog

Eleutherodactylus abbotti, sometimes known as the Abbott's robber frog, is a species of frog in the family Eleutherodactylidae endemic to Hispaniola (Haiti and the Dominican Republic). It is very common species inhabiting mesic woods and forest and open habitats, including urban areas. Typically it is found under litter, logs and trash.
