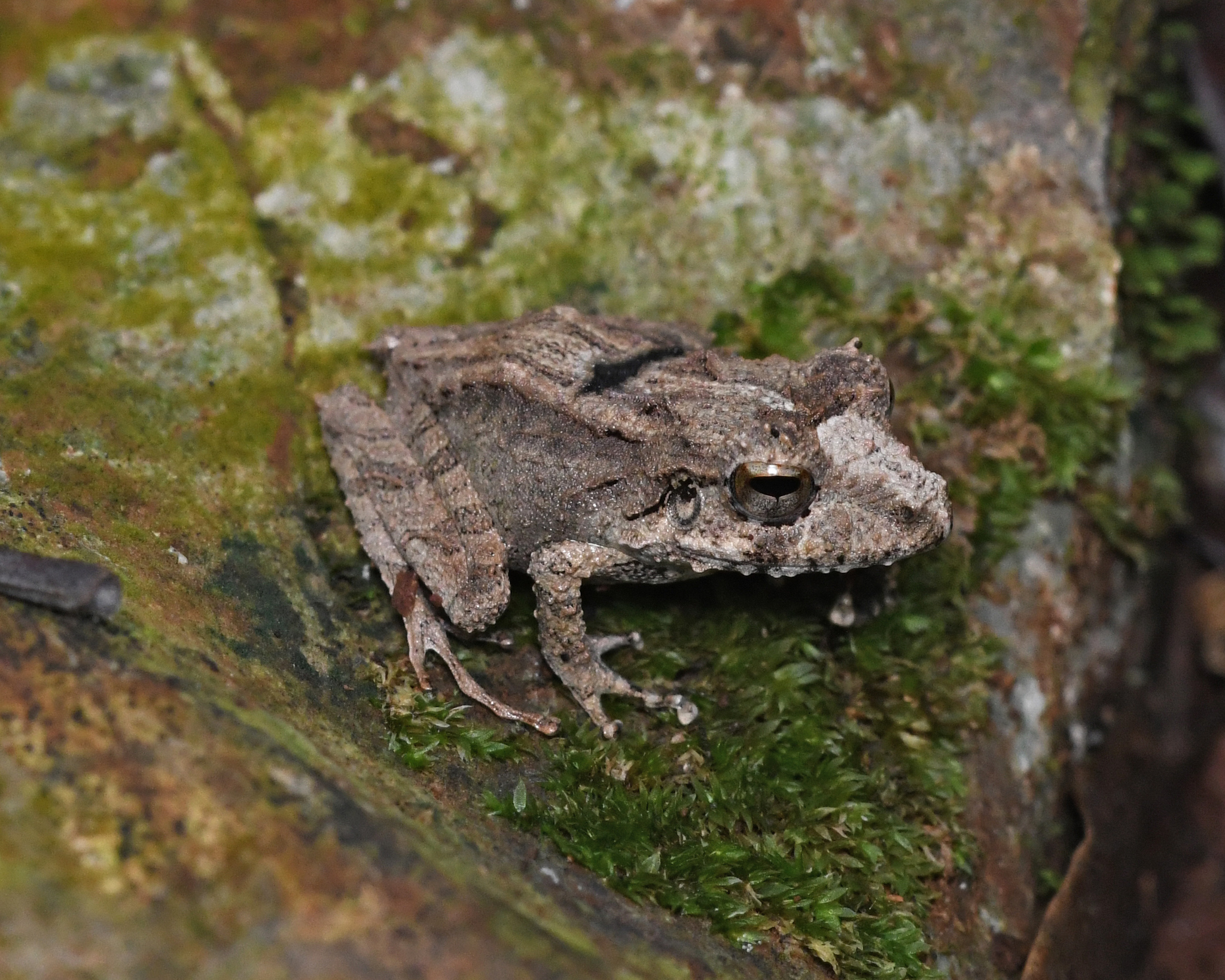

Conservation status
- Near Threatened (IUCN 3.1)

Scientific classification
- Kingdom: Animalia
- Phylum: Chordata
- Class: Amphibia
- Order: Anura
- Family: Eleutherodactylidae
- Genus: Eleutherodactylus
- Species: E. inoptatus

Binomial name
- Eleutherodactylus inoptatus (Barbour, 1914)

Synonyms
- Eleutherodactylus beebei (Cochran, 1956)

= Eleutherodactylus inoptatus =

Species of frog

Eleutherodactylus inoptatus (common name: Diquini robber frog) is a species of frog in the family Eleutherodactylidae endemic to Hispaniola; it is found both in Haiti and the Dominican Republic. With female snout–vent length of about 88 mm (3.5 in), it is the largest eleutherodactylid frog.

Eleutherodactylus inoptatus is a common frog found in mesic hardwood forest. It can also live in coffee and banana plantations as long as there are trees and shade. It is impacted by habitat loss.
