= La Hotte bush frog =

Conservation status
- Critically Endangered (IUCN 3.1)

Scientific classification
- Kingdom: Animalia
- Phylum: Chordata
- Class: Amphibia
- Order: Anura
- Clade: Brachycephaloidea
- Family: Eleutherodactylidae
- Genus: Eleutherodactylus
- Species: E. bakeri

Binomial name
- Eleutherodactylus bakeri Cochran, 1935

Species of amphibian

The La Hotte bush frog or Baker's robber frog (Eleutherodactylus bakeri) is a species of frog in the family Eleutherodactylidae endemic to the Massif de la Hotte in southwestern Haiti. Its natural habitat is closed-canopy forest (now largely gone). This arboreal frog hides by day in bromeliads where it also lays the eggs. It is threatened by habitat loss.
