= La Visite National Park =

National park in Haiti

- Parc National La Visite
- IUCN category II (national park)
- Location within Haiti
- Location: Haiti
- Coordinates: 18.33°N 72.33°W
- Area: 30 km^{2} (12 sq mi)

La Visite National Park (French: Parc National La Visite) is one of the two largest national parks of the Republic of Haiti. La Visite is a part of the Massif de la Selle mountain range. Its highest peak is 2275 meters in elevation. The park covers approximately 11,419 hectares of land with 1897 hectares above 2000 meters in elevation, and consists mainly of pine forest, grasslands, and some montane broadleaf forest above 1,700 m (5,600 ft) elevation. The Haitian government established the La Visite National Park in 1983. The capital, Port-au-Prince, is only 22 kilometers north from the park. The northern boundary of La Visite National Park is the east–west running escarpment of the Massif de la Selle.

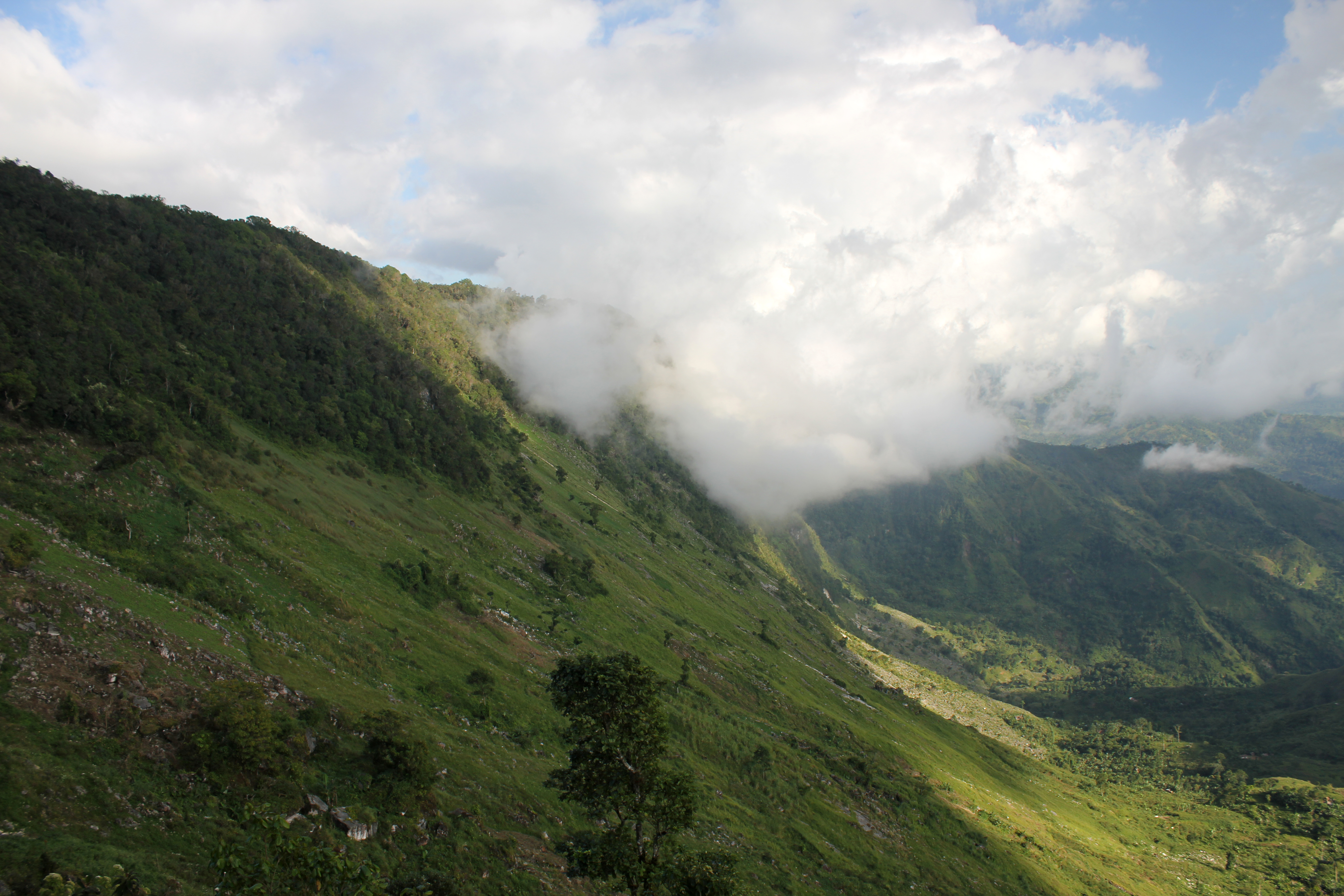
Forest on the plateau of Morne d'Enfer in La Visite National Park

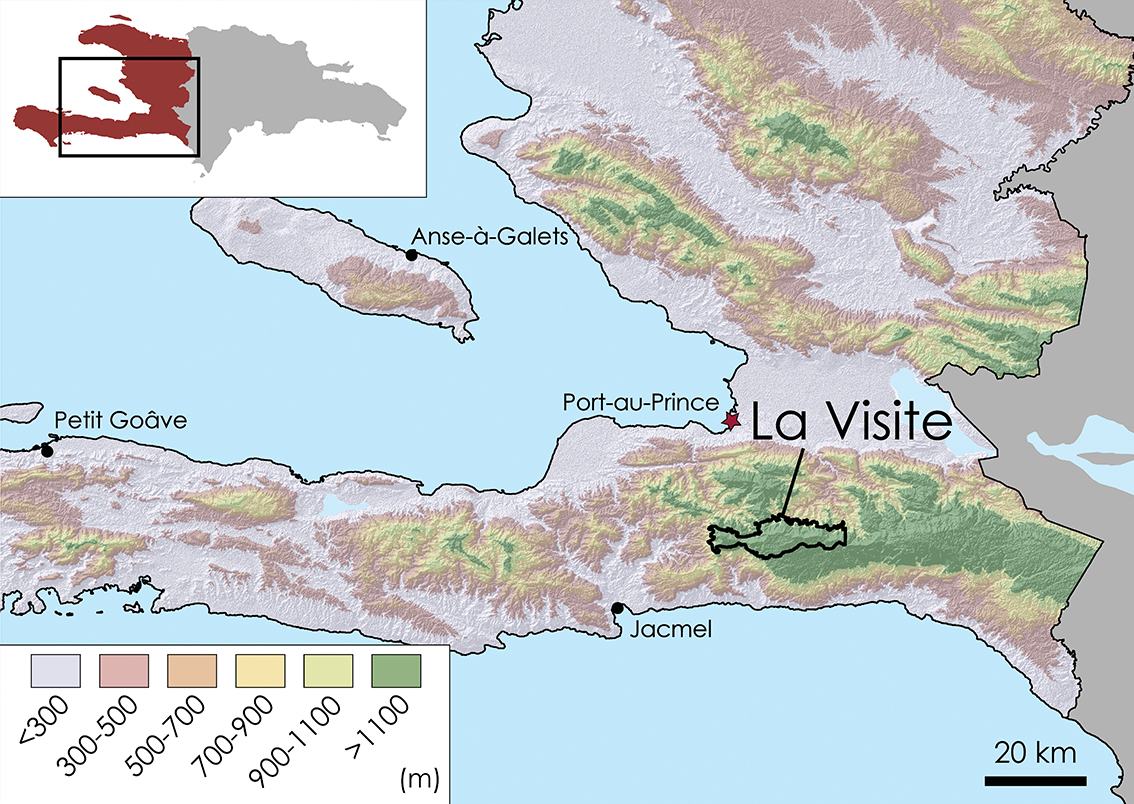
La Visite boundaries on a topographic map of Haiti

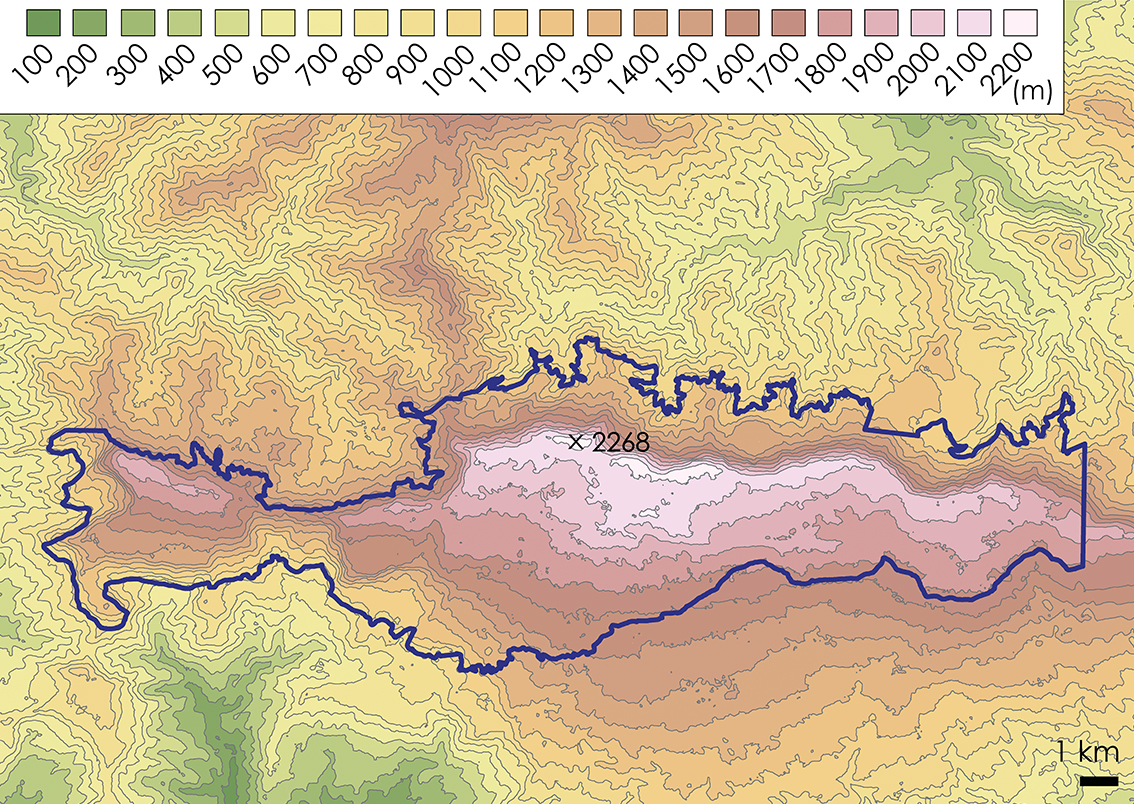
Detailed topographic map of La Visite

== Vegetation ==
The park's vegetation is broadleaf forest, grasslands and pine trees. The Hispaniolan Pine (Pinus occidentalis) is the most widespread tree in the park. Other type of forests that cover the park include karst broadleaf and wet broadleaf montane.

== Avifauna ==
The park offers excellent opportunities for birdwatching. The park is home to over 80 species of birds. A number of threatened species, including some endemic to the island of Hispaniola, can be seen in the park.

== See also ==
- List of national parks of Haiti
- Haiti National Trust
