= Chaîne de la Selle =

Mountain range of Haiti

Coordinates: 18°22′N 71°59′W

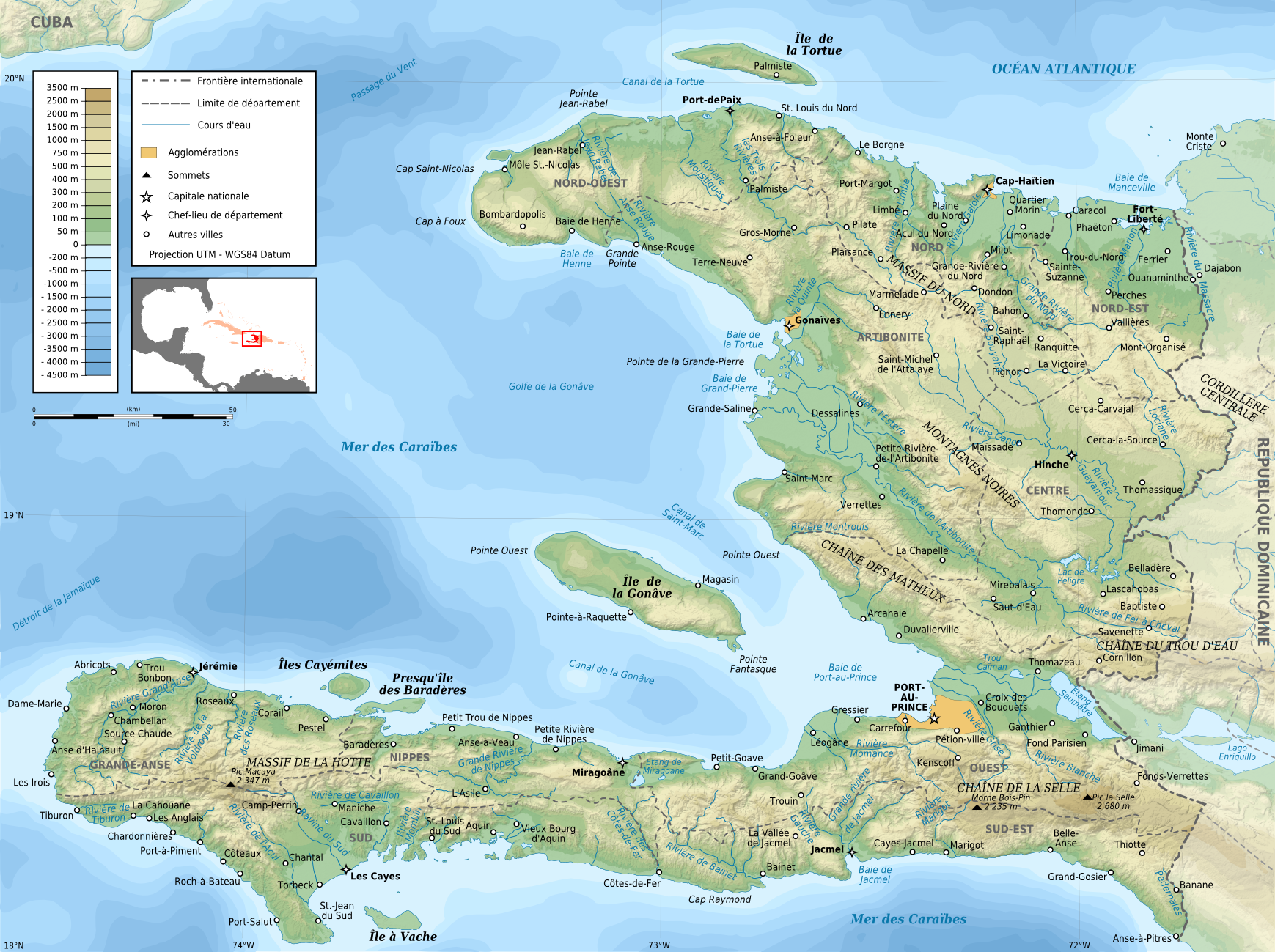
- Topographic map of Haiti showing the Chaîne de la Selle in the southeast

Highest point
- Peak: Pic la Selle
- Elevation: 2,680 m (8,790 ft)

Geography
- Country: Haiti
- State(s): Ouest, Sud-Est

Geology
- Rock type: Limestone

Chaîne de la Selle (French pronunciation: [ʃɛn də la sɛl]) is a mountain range in Haiti, on the island of Hispaniola.

The range's Pic la Selle is the highest point of Haiti, at a height of 2,680 meters (8,793 feet) above sea level.

== See also ==
- Mountain ranges of the Caribbean
