= Pic Macaya National Park =

National park in Haiti

- Parc National Pic Macaya
- IUCN category II (national park)
- Location within Haiti
- Location: Haiti
- Coordinates: 18°22′17″N 74°01′13″W
- Area: 55 km^{2} (21 sq mi)

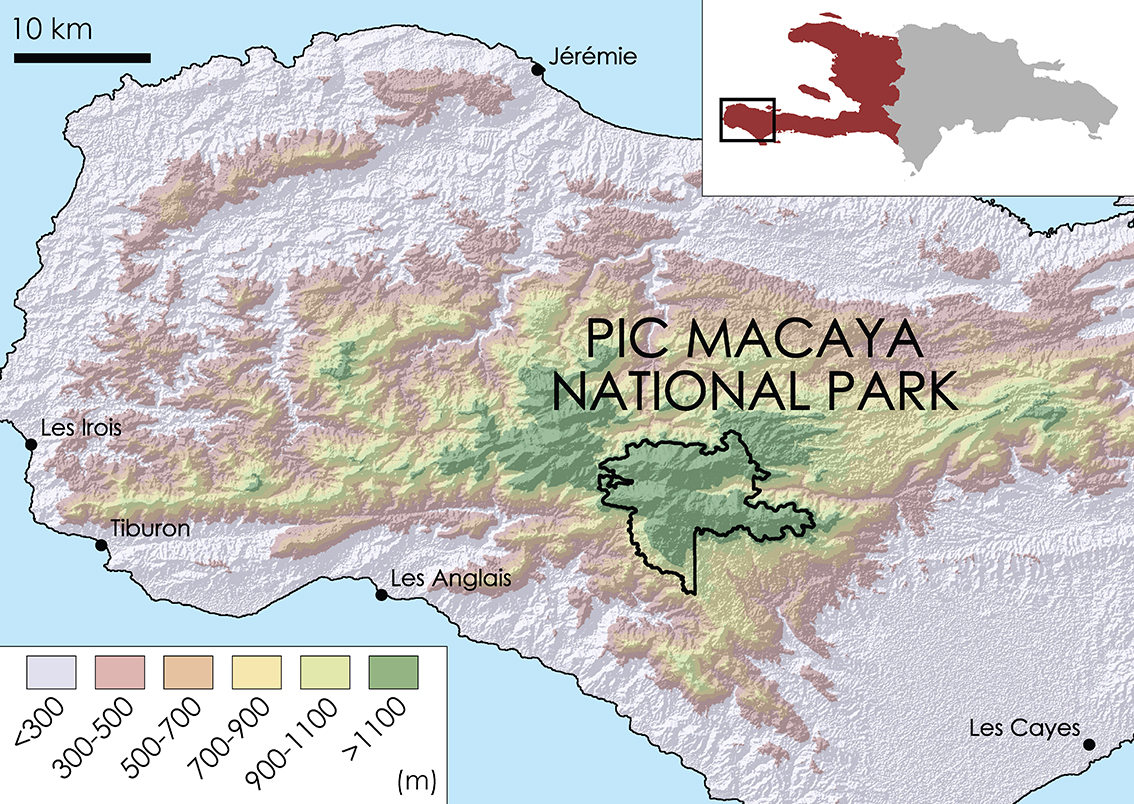
Pic Macaya National Park boundaries on a topographic map of Haiti

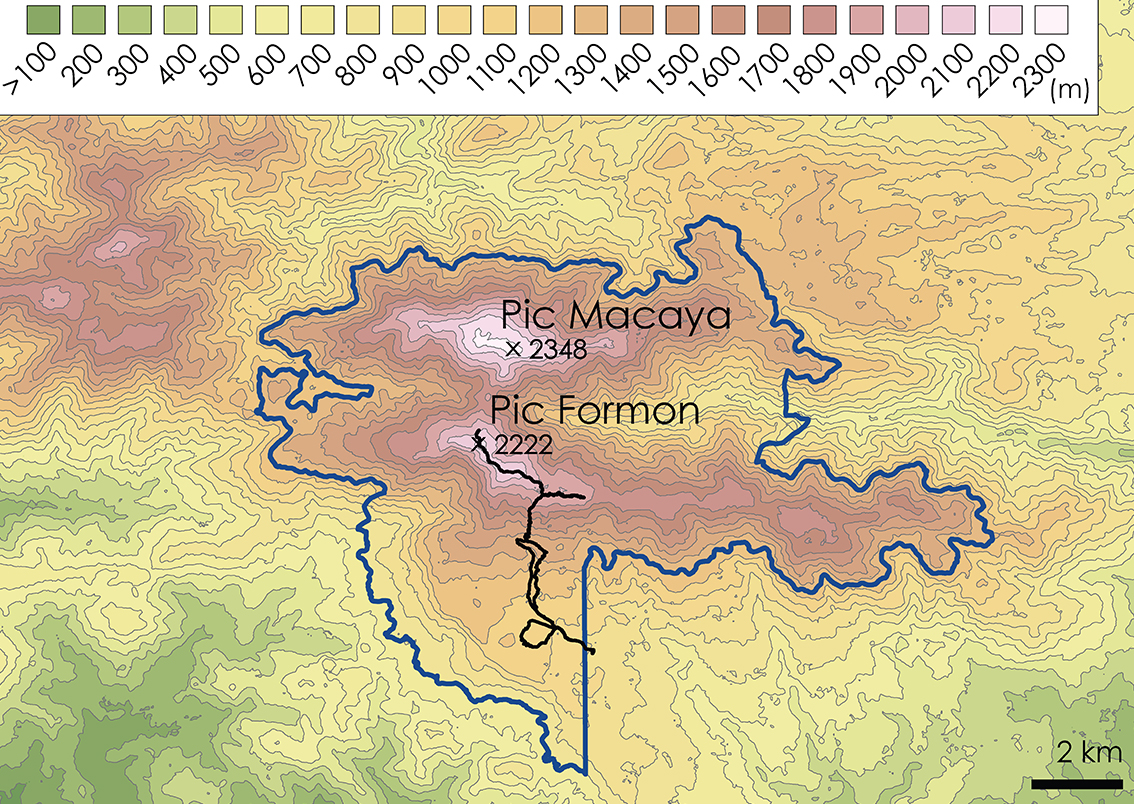
Detailed topographic map of Pic Macaya National Park and its peaks

Pic Macaya National Park (French: Parc National Pic Macaya) is one of two largest national parks of the Republic of Haiti. It is located in the country's southern peninsula, within the Massif de la Hotte. Featuring the country's last stand of virgin cloud forest, it encompasses more than 8,000 hectares. Elevations in the rugged park reach a maximum height of 2,347 meters (7,700 feet) above sea level at Pic Macaya (Macaya Peak), the second highest point in Haiti behind Pic la Selle. A majority of the park is composed of two tall peaks: Pic Macaya and Pic Formon.

The park was founded in 1984, under the administration of Jean-Claude Duvalier. Originally composed of about 2,000 hectares, the park was expanded to more than 8,000 hectares in March 2013 as part of the Macaya Project. In December 2012, $12 million was pledged through 2017 in agreements with several international development agencies, including the Inter-American Development Bank and the Norwegian Agency for Development Cooperation. The initiative aims to increase protection of the park's natural resources by improving land management. This includes reforesting degraded areas, building infrastructure to reduce erosion from flooding, and enforcing the protection of the park's diverse plant and animal life. One of the biggest challenges to the park is the practice of "charcoal burning", in which large swathes of biomass are burned to produce charcoal, which can be sold at a high price by local inhabitants.

The mountains of the Massif de la Hotte are mainly karstic and volcanic. The park features endangered plant and animal life, including some endemic to the island of Hispaniola. There are 220 species of birds present in the park, 141 species of orchids, and 367 flowering plants. Six species of frogs, believed to be extinct, have been seen the region in the past several years. Over 6,500 species of plants live at Pic Macaya.

Humid forests on karstic limestone occur from about 850 to 1250 meters elevation. At higher elevations the park is covered with a mosaic of open pine forest and denser broadleaf cloud forest. All three forest types are home to numerous endemic species. Pinus occidentalis is the predominant tree of the pine forests, and is sometimes an emergent tree in the cloud forests. The pine forest understory includes blackberry (Rubus spp.), diverse ferns, and scattered shrubs and small trees. The predominant tree in the cloud forests is bois tremble (Frodinia tremula), with small trees and shrubs including Garrya fadyenii, Myrsine coriacea, Brunellia comocladiifolia, Persea hypoleuca, Weinmannia pinnata, Cestrum coelophlebium, and Miconia spp., the tree ferns Cyathea harrisii and Alsophila minor, and the climbing bamboo Arthrostylidium haitiense. The distribution of the pine and cloud forests depends on soils, rainfall, exposure, and disturbance by fire and hurricanes. Frequent fires favor pine germination and kill the young broadleaf trees.

== See also ==
- List of national parks of Haiti
- Haiti National Trust
