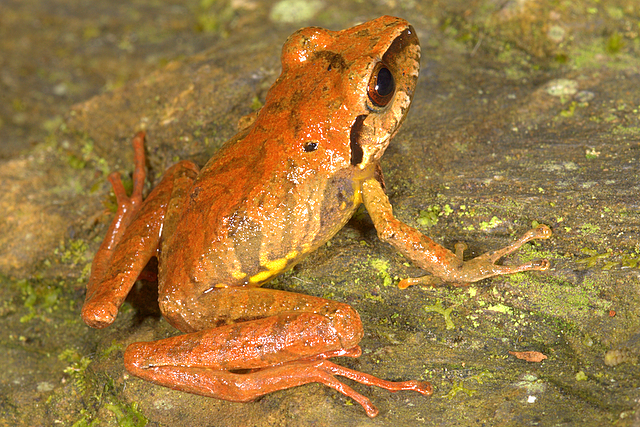
- Eleutherodactylus danae

Scientific classification
- Kingdom: Animalia
- Phylum: Chordata
- Class: Amphibia
- Order: Anura
- Clade: Brachycephaloidea
- Family: Eleutherodactylidae; Lutz, 1954

Subfamilia
- Eleutherodactylinae; Phyzelaphryninae

Synonyms
- Eleutherodactylinae Lutz, 1954

= Eleutherodactylidae =

Family of amphibians

The Eleutherodactylidae are a family of direct-developing frogs native to northern South America, the Caribbean, and southernmost North America. They are sometimes known under the common name rain frogs. Formerly the subfamily Eleutherodactylinae of the family Leptodactylidae, it was raised to the family status following a major revision of New World direct-developing frogs in 2008. As currently defined, the family has more than 200 species (as of 2014, 206 or 207 species).

Eleutherodactylid frogs vary considerably in size, from the minuscule Eleutherodactylus iberia (female snout–vent length 10.5 mm (0.41 in)) to the relative giant E. inoptatus (female snout–vent length 88 mm (3.5 in)). Except for the ovoviviparous E. jasperi, these frogs have direct development: no free-living tadpole stage exists; instead, eggs develop directly into small froglets.

== Subfamilies and genera ==
The two subfamilies and four genera are:

- Eleutherodactylinae Lutz, 1954 (216 species)
  - Diasporus Hedges, Duellman, and Heinicke, 2008
  - Eleutherodactylus Duméril and Bibron, 1841
- Phyzelaphryninae Hedges, Duellman, and Heinicke, 2008 (12 species)
  - Adelophryne Hoogmoed and Lescure, 1984
  - Phyzelaphryne Heyer, 1977
