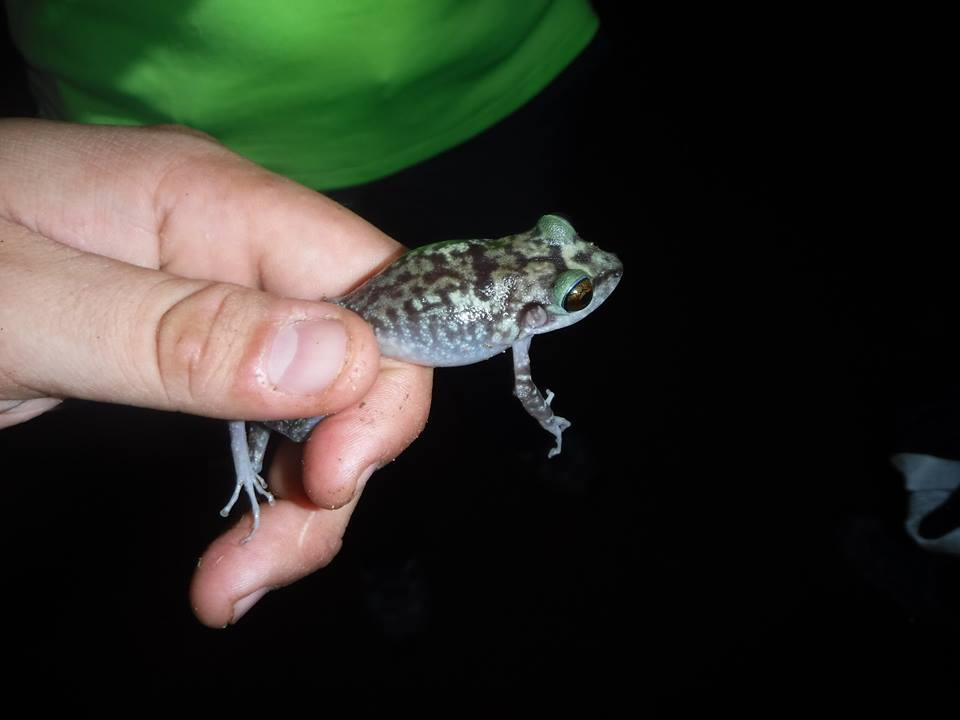

Conservation status
- Endangered (IUCN 3.1)

Scientific classification
- Kingdom: Animalia
- Phylum: Chordata
- Class: Amphibia
- Order: Anura
- Family: Eleutherodactylidae
- Genus: Eleutherodactylus
- Subgenus: Euhyas
- Species: E. pinarensis

Binomial name
- Eleutherodactylus pinarensis Dunn, 1926

Synonyms
- Euhyas pinarensis (Dunn, 1926)

= Eleutherodactylus pinarensis =

Species of amphibian

Eleutherodactylus pinarensis is a species of frog in the family Eleutherodactylidae. It endemic to Cuba and known from scattered localities in the western part of the island as well as from Isla de la Juventud (its type locality, formerly Isla de Pinos). Common name Pinos robber frog has been coined for it.

== Description ==
Eleutherodactylus pinarensis is a relatively large species. The tympanum is relatively large, nearly as large as the eye. Fingers III and IV have developed disks. Toes are without webbing. Skin is uniformly shagreened above whereas the belly is feebly rugose. Coloration is marbled dark and light with indications of crossbars or dorso-lateral light lines.

Specimens described by Dunn as "cross-barred juveniles" were later described as a separate species, Eleutherodactylus klinikowskii.

== Habitat and conservation ==
Eleutherodactylus pinarensis occurs in rocky areas, coastal cliffs, and caves in mesic forests. It does not occur outside forest habitat. It is an uncommon species. It is threatened by habitat disturbance caused by tourist activities, including infrastructure development for tourism. It occurs in the Guanahacabibes National Park and in several other protected areas.
