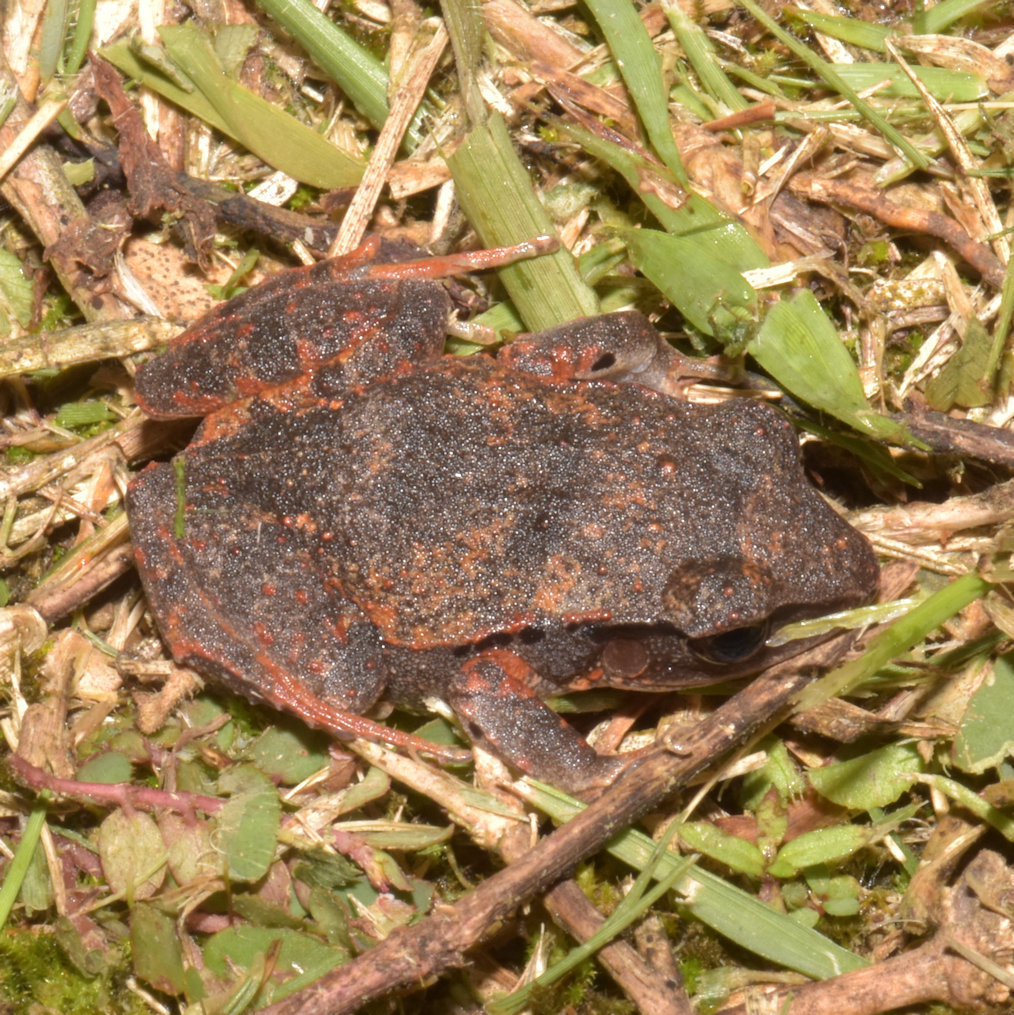
- Kingston, Jamaica, 2020

Conservation status
- Endangered (IUCN 3.1)

Scientific classification
- Kingdom: Animalia
- Phylum: Chordata
- Class: Amphibia
- Order: Anura
- Family: Eleutherodactylidae
- Genus: Eleutherodactylus
- Subgenus: Euhyas
- Species: E. pentasyringos

Binomial name
- Eleutherodactylus pentasyringos Schwartz and Fowler, 1973

Synonyms
- Eleutherodactylus pantoni ssp. pentasyringos Schwartz and Fowler, 1973; Euhyas pentasyringos (Schwartz and Fowler, 1973)

= Eleutherodactylus pentasyringos =

Species of frog

Eleutherodactylus pentasyringos, also known as John Crow yellow-bellied frog and tube robber frog, is a species of frog in the family Eleutherodactylidae. It is endemic to Jamaica. The specific name pentasyringos is derived from Greek and means "calling five times", in allusion to the male advertisement call that typically consists of five "took"-notes.

== Description ==
Males grow to 32 mm (1.3 in) and females to 39 mm (1.5 in) in snout–vent length. The head is wider than it is long. The snout is sharply truncate. The tympanum is small but visible. The digital discs are small. No webbing is present. Dorsal coloration in preserved specimens is medium brown. Dorsal patterns are variable, but all individuals have a dark scapular W-mark and many have a dark intraocular bar. Most specimens are mottled. Some have middorsal line or dorsolateral stripes. Ventral coloration varies from pale orange to pale yellow or white. Mature or gravid females show the brightest orange hues. In adults, the throat has fine and uniform dark brown stippling.

== Distribution and habitat ==
This species occurs in the north of the Blue Mountains and the John Crow Mountains, extending to the northeastern coast of Jamaica. It is found from sea level to 1,275 m (4,183 ft) asl. It is found in mesic forests (montane rainforest, wet limestone forest, elfin woodland) in rocky areas of this region. Eggs are laid on the ground and it breeds by direct development (i.e., there is no free-living larval stage).

== Conservation ==
The range of the species is limited and its forest habitat is declining rapidly due to agriculture, human settlement, and logging – also in protected areas and national parks. Although still fairly common and abundant, the population is inferred to be decreasing.
