= Eleutherodactylus cattus =

Conservation status
- Endangered (IUCN 3.1)

Scientific classification
- Kingdom: Animalia
- Phylum: Chordata
- Class: Amphibia
- Order: Anura
- Clade: Brachycephaloidea
- Family: Eleutherodactylidae
- Genus: Eleutherodactylus
- Subgenus: Eleutherodactylus
- Species: E. cattus

Binomial name
- Eleutherodactylus cattus Rodríguez, Dugo-Cota, Montero-Mendieta, Gonzalez-Voyer, Alonso Bosch, Vences, and Vilà, 2017

Species of frog endemic to Cuba

Eleutherodactylus cattus is a species of robber frog in the family Eleutherodactylidae. It is endemic to the Sierra del Cobre in eastern Cuba. Identified in 2017, this cryptic, high-elevation species was previously thought to be a population of Eleutherodactylus glamyrus.

== Taxonomy and etymology ==
The species was described in 2017 by Rodríguez et al. following a study of the genetics, morphology, and bioacoustics of high-elevation frogs in the Sierra Maestra Massif. The study revealed that populations in the Sierra del Cobre represented a distinct evolutionary lineage from those in the west (Cordillera del Turquino). Genetic analysis of mitochondrial genes (16S and cob) and the nuclear gene Rag-1 supported this separation. The describing authors placed it in Eleutherodactylus subgenus Eleutherodactylus alongside E. glamyrus and the E. auriculatus species complex.

The holotype specimen is an adult male collected in 2010. The specific epithet cattus is Latin for "cat", in reference to the type locality, Loma del Gato (Cat Mountain Ridge).

== Distribution and habitat ==
The species is known only from the type locality at Loma del Gato in the Sierra del Cobre, Santiago de Cuba. It occurs in montane rainforests and elfin woodlands at altitudes of 800–1,070 m (2,620–3,510 ft) above sea level.

== Description ==
Eleutherodactylus cattus is distinguished from its closest relative, E. glamyrus, by its larger body size and distinct vocalizations. The dorsum is generally brown to beige with dark mottling and distinct dark anterior dorsolateral marks.

The male advertisement call differs significantly from E. glamyrus; it is longer, slower, and lower-pitched. It likely breeds via direct development, as in other Eleutherodactylus species.
