= Eleutherodactylus jamesdixoni =

Scientific classification
- Domain: Eukaryota
- Kingdom: Animalia
- Phylum: Chordata
- Class: Amphibia
- Order: Anura
- Family: Eleutherodactylidae
- Genus: Eleutherodactylus
- Subgenus: Syrrhophus
- Species: E. jamesdixoni

Binomial name
- Eleutherodactylus jamesdixoni Devitt et al., 2023

Species of frog

Eleutherodactylus jamesdixoni (common name: Dixon's peeping frog, Spanish: rana fisgona de Dixon) is a species of frog in the family Eleutherodactylidae. It is endemic to western Mexico and known from specimens collected in Jalisco, Nayarit, and Sinaloa.

== Taxonomy ==
This species was first described in 2023 and named in honor of American herpetologist James R. Dixon. It is the sister taxon of E. nitidus.

== Description ==
The male holotype of E. jamesdixoni measured 21.96 mm (0.865 in) in snout-vent length. Its dorsal surfaces have an irregular scattering of small tubercles and are colored a mottled pattern of dark green, tan, and pale orange, whereas its belly is a mottled black and white. The iris is split between a black lower half and a golden upper half. The tips of the third and fourth fingers are expansive and slightly smaller than those of E. nitidus.

== Habitat and conservation ==
This species is found in pine-oak woodland in the southern Sierra Madre Occidental range as well as the westernmost extent of the Eje Neovolcánico and Sierra Madre del Sur ranges. The three type specimens were found at an elevation of 1,992 m (6,535 ft) above sea level at night, calling from low vegetation.

As E. jamesdixoni is a very recently described species, its conservation status has not yet been determined and particular risks to its existence are unknown.
