= Eleutherodactylus glaucoreius =

Conservation status
- Endangered (IUCN 3.1)

Scientific classification
- Kingdom: Animalia
- Phylum: Chordata
- Class: Amphibia
- Order: Anura
- Family: Eleutherodactylidae
- Genus: Eleutherodactylus
- Subgenus: Euhyas
- Species: E. glaucoreius

Binomial name
- Eleutherodactylus glaucoreius Schwartz and Fowler, 1973

Synonyms
- Eleutherodactylus cundalli ssp. glaucoreius Schwartz and Fowler, 1973; Euhyas glaucoreius (Schwartz and Fowler, 1973)

Species of frog

Eleutherodactylus glaucoreius, also known as Blue Mountain frog and Portland Parish robber frog, is a species of frog in the family Eleutherodactylidae. It is endemic to Jamaica. The specific name glaucoreius is derived from Greek glaucos ("pale blue") and oreios ("mountain"), in allusion to the occurrence of this taxon in the Blue Mountains.

== Description ==
Males grow to 28 mm (1.1 in) and females to 32 mm (1.3 in) in snout–vent length. The head is as wide as it is long. The snout is acuminate but sharply truncate. The tympanum is small but visible. The digital discs are moderately sized. No webbing is present. Dorsal coloration is tan to gray, with some individuals having hint of red or orange. Dorsal patterns are variable; most individuals are either mottled with dark brown or have tan or reddish tan dorsolateral stripes. Scapular W-shaped marking is almost always present, often followed by another W in mid-dorsum. Many individuals have lateral spotting. Ventral coloration is pale yellow, often with brown or back pigmenting. The throat is heavily pigmented.

== Distribution and habitat ==
This species is restricted to eastern Jamaica. It is found from sea level to 1,650 m (5,410 ft) asl. It is also reported from one location on the north coast, but it is unknown whether this represents a viable population. It is a terrestrial frog that is often found on and inside rocky formations in rainforest but also in secondary forest. It can also occurs inside piles of coconut husks. Eggs are laid on the ground and it breeds by direct development (i.e., there is no free-living larval stage).

== Conservation ==
Eleutherodactylus glaucoreius has a small range but appears to be locally relatively common. It seems to tolerate some habitat disturbance as long as closed canopy remains. However, it is still threatened by loss of its forest habitat caused by agriculture, human settlement, and logging – also in protected areas and national parks. The population is inferred to be decreasing.
