= Eleutherodactylus junori =

Conservation status
- Critically Endangered (IUCN 3.1)

Scientific classification
- Kingdom: Animalia
- Phylum: Chordata
- Class: Amphibia
- Order: Anura
- Clade: Brachycephaloidea
- Family: Eleutherodactylidae
- Genus: Eleutherodactylus
- Species: E. junori

Binomial name
- Eleutherodactylus junori Dunn, 1926

Species of frog

Eleutherodactylus junori is a species of frog in the family Eleutherodactylidae endemic to Jamaica. Its natural habitats are subtropical or tropical moist lowland forest, rocky areas, rural gardens, and heavily degraded former forest. It is threatened by habitat loss.
