= Eleutherodactylus symingtoni =

Conservation status
- Critically Endangered (IUCN 3.1)

Scientific classification
- Kingdom: Animalia
- Phylum: Chordata
- Class: Amphibia
- Order: Anura
- Clade: Brachycephaloidea
- Family: Eleutherodactylidae
- Genus: Eleutherodactylus
- Species: E. symingtoni

Binomial name
- Eleutherodactylus symingtoni Schwartz, 1957

Synonyms
- Eleutherodactylus delacruzi Estrada, Rodriguez & Moreno, 1986; Euhyas symingtoni Frost et al., 2006

Species of amphibian

Eleutherodactylus symingtoni, commonly called the western spiny frog or Symington's robber frog, is a species of frog in the family Eleutherodactylidae. It is endemic to western Cuba, where it is found in rocky areas and caves in subtropical or tropical moist lowland forest. It is threatened by habitat disturbance and may be impacted by chytridiomycosis, though presence of the fungus has not been documented in any populations.

It has eyes 50% larger than its closest relative. This indicates special adaptation to its low light environment.
