= Eleutherodactylus rucillensis =

Conservation status
- Data Deficient (IUCN 3.1)

Scientific classification
- Kingdom: Animalia
- Phylum: Chordata
- Class: Amphibia
- Order: Anura
- Clade: Brachycephaloidea
- Family: Eleutherodactylidae
- Genus: Eleutherodactylus
- Species: E. rucillensis

Binomial name
- Eleutherodactylus rucillensis Cochran, 1939

Species of frog

Eleutherodactylus rucillensis is a little-known species of frog within the family Eleutherodactylidae. It is thought to occur in parts of the Caribbean, though its exact range has not been clearly documented.

== Taxonomy ==
This species was first described in 1939 by Doris M. Cochran, a herpetologist who studied Caribbean amphibians. It belongs to the genus Eleutherodactylus, a large and diverse group of frogs notable for their direct development.

== Physical characteristics ==
There is very little published detail describing the appearance of E. rucillensis. However, it is known to be a small, ground-dwelling frog with coloring that helps it blend into leaf litter, like its relatives. Like others in its genus, it develops directly from egg to frog without a free-swimming larval stage.

== Habitat and distribution ==
Although precise locality data are scarce, the species is assumed to inhabit humid terrestrial environments such as forest floors or other areas with consistent moisture. These frogs typically rely on sheltered microhabitats to prevent desiccation.

== Conservation ==
Due to insufficient information regarding its population size, distribution, or threats, Eleutherodactylus rucillensis is generally treated as Data Deficient by conservation standards.

== Behavior ==
Although specific observations are lacking, it is likely nocturnal and feeds on small invertebrates. Reproduction of Eleutherodactylus rucillensis follows the direct-development pattern characteristic of the genus.
