= Eleutherodactylus bartonsmithi =

Conservation status
- Critically Endangered (IUCN 3.1)

Scientific classification
- Kingdom: Animalia
- Phylum: Chordata
- Class: Amphibia
- Order: Anura
- Clade: Brachycephaloidea
- Family: Eleutherodactylidae
- Genus: Eleutherodactylus
- Subgenus: Eleutherodactylus
- Species: E. bartonsmithi

Binomial name
- Eleutherodactylus bartonsmithi Schwartz, 1960

Species of amphibian

Eleutherodactylus bartonsmithi (Barton's robber frog) is a species of frog in the family Eleutherodactylidae. It is endemic to southeastern Cuba where it is only known from the Guantánamo Province near the mouth Yumurí River and from Cupeyal in the Holguín Province. The latter location is in the Alejandro de Humboldt National Park, but its validity has been questioned.

The specific name refers to Barton L. Smith, herpetologist who assisted Albert Schwartz during his field work in the Caribbean.

The species' natural habitat is low-elevation closed forest, but it may also occur in coffee plantations. It is an arboreal species heard calling from shrubs, but can also be found in rock crevices. It is threatened by habitat loss.
