= Eleutherodactylus michaelschmidi =

Conservation status
- Endangered (IUCN 3.1)

Scientific classification
- Kingdom: Animalia
- Phylum: Chordata
- Class: Amphibia
- Order: Anura
- Family: Eleutherodactylidae
- Genus: Eleutherodactylus
- Species: E. michaelschmidi

Binomial name
- Eleutherodactylus michaelschmidi Díaz, Cádiz & Navarro, 2007

Species of amphibian

Eleutherodactylus michaelschmidi, the Sierra Maestra blotched frog, is a species of frog endemic to Cuba. It is also called robber frog and rain frog. It has been classified as endangered on the IUCN Global Red List and as vulnerable on the IUCN National Red List for Cuba. It was last observed in 2007.
