= Eleutherodactylus maestrensis =

Conservation status
- Data Deficient (IUCN 3.1)

Scientific classification
- Kingdom: Animalia
- Phylum: Chordata
- Class: Amphibia
- Order: Anura
- Family: Eleutherodactylidae
- Genus: Eleutherodactylus
- Species: E. maestrensis

Binomial name
- Eleutherodactylus maestrensis Díaz, Cádiz & Navarro, 2005

Species of amphibian

Eleutherodactylus maestrensis is a species of frogs in the family Eleutherodactylidae endemic to Cuba. Its natural habitat is subtropical or tropical moist montane forest.
