= Eleutherodactylus interorbitalis =

Conservation status
- Least Concern (IUCN 3.1)

Scientific classification
- Kingdom: Animalia
- Phylum: Chordata
- Class: Amphibia
- Order: Anura
- Family: Eleutherodactylidae
- Genus: Eleutherodactylus
- Subgenus: Syrrhophus
- Species: E. interorbitalis

Binomial name
- Eleutherodactylus interorbitalis (Langerbartel and Shannon, 1956)

Synonyms
- Syrrhopus interorbitalis Langebartel and Shannon, 1956

Species of frog

Eleutherodactylus interorbitalis, also known as the Sinaloa piping frog and spectacled chirping frog, is a species of frog in the family Eleutherodactylidae. It is endemic to Mexico and is known from the states of Sonora, Chihuahua, Sinaloa, and Durango. It occurs in the foothills of tropical deciduous forest and in open oak woodlands with a rocky, grass understory at elevations of 200–1,600 m (660–5,250 ft) above sea level. It tolerates deforestation as long as there are rocky areas available. Development is direct (i.e., there is no free-living larval stage). It can locally suffer from habitat deterioration but is not threatened overall.
