= Eleutherodactylus humboldti =

Scientific classification
- Domain: Eukaryota
- Kingdom: Animalia
- Phylum: Chordata
- Class: Amphibia
- Order: Anura
- Family: Eleutherodactylidae
- Genus: Eleutherodactylus
- Subgenus: Syrrhophus
- Species: E. humboldti

Binomial name
- Eleutherodactylus humboldti Devitt et al., 2023

Species of frog

Eleutherodactylus humboldti (common name: Humboldt's peeping frog, Spanish: rana fisgona de Humboldt) is a species of frog in the family Eleutherodactylidae. It is endemic to central Mexico and known from specimens collected in the State of Mexico.

== Taxonomy ==
This species was first described in 2023 and named in honor of German naturalist Alexander von Humboldt.

== Description ==
Eleutherodactylus humboldti has a triangular head and measures 23.4–25.7 mm (0.92–1.01 in) in snout-vent length. Its dorsal surfaces have small tubercles and are colored a brownish tan, whereas its ventral surfaces are translucent brownish tan with white tipped small tubercles on the belly and thighs. Its concealed surfaces on the posterior thigh and upper arm have an orange flash. The iris is split between a black lower half and a golden upper half.

== Habitat and conservation ==
This species is found in clearings in pine-oak woodland in the Mil Cumbres region of the Eje Neovolcánico range. The three type specimens were found at an elevation of 1,982 m (6,503 ft) above sea level at night, calling from low vegetation.
