= Eleutherodactylus verruculatus =

Conservation status
- Data Deficient (IUCN 3.1)

Scientific classification
- Kingdom: Animalia
- Phylum: Chordata
- Class: Amphibia
- Order: Anura
- Family: Eleutherodactylidae
- Genus: Eleutherodactylus
- Species: E. verruculatus

Binomial name
- Eleutherodactylus verruculatus (Peters, 1870)

Species of frog

Eleutherodactylus verruculatus is a species of frog in the family Eleutherodactylidae. It is endemic to Mexico.
