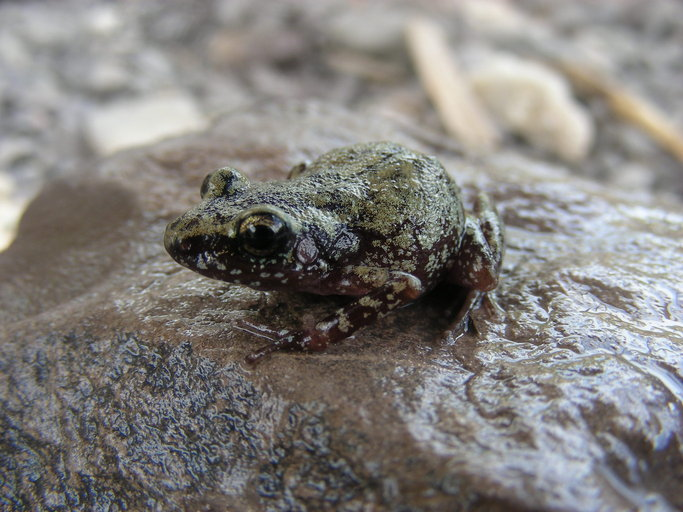

Conservation status
- Least Concern (IUCN 3.1)

Scientific classification
- Kingdom: Animalia
- Phylum: Chordata
- Class: Amphibia
- Order: Anura
- Family: Eleutherodactylidae
- Genus: Eleutherodactylus
- Subgenus: Syrrhophus
- Species: E. pipilans

Binomial name
- Eleutherodactylus pipilans (Taylor, 1940)

Synonyms
- Syrrhophus pipilans Taylor, 1940; Syrrhophus nebulosus Taylor, 1943

= Eleutherodactylus pipilans =

Species of frog

Eleutherodactylus pipilans is a species of frog in the family Eleutherodactylidae. It is found in southern and southeastern Mexico (south-central Guerrero to southern Oaxaca to southern Chiapas) and southwestern Guatemala.

== Taxonomy ==
Two subspecies are sometimes recognized:

- Eleutherodactylus pipilans pipilans
- Eleutherodactylus pipilans nebulosus

E. p. nebulosus was first described as a separate species, but became treated as a subspecies by Duellman in 1958. Common name nebulous chirping frog refers to this subspecies, whereas common name whistling chirping frog may either refer to the species as a whole or the nominotypical subspecies E. p. pipilans. The subspecies differ in relative tympanum size and coloration.

== Description ==
Adult males measure 23–29 mm (0.91–1.14 in) and females 21–29 mm (0.83–1.14 in) in snout–vent length. Skin of the dorsum is smooth or shagreened. The eyes are relatively large. The tympanum is visible and oval in shape. The arms are long while the legs are relatively short. The dorsal background color is dark brown to slightly lighter brown. There are yellow, orange, light brown, or greenish blotches or spots. The limbs are banded. Males have vocal slits.

== Habitat and conservation ==
Its natural habitats are tropical seasonal forests at elevations of 100–800 m (330–2,620 ft) above sea level. Individuals are found in a range of microhabitats: on the rocks, on the ground, under rocks and debris, and in a cave. Although locally abundant and tolerating some habitat modification, it is threatened by habitat loss.
