= Eleutherodactylus rubrimaculatus =

Conservation status
- Least Concern (IUCN 3.1)

Scientific classification
- Kingdom: Animalia
- Phylum: Chordata
- Class: Amphibia
- Order: Anura
- Family: Eleutherodactylidae
- Genus: Eleutherodactylus
- Subgenus: Syrrhophus
- Species: E. rubrimaculatus

Binomial name
- Eleutherodactylus rubrimaculatus (Taylor and Smith, 1945)

Synonyms
- Syrrhophus rubrimaculatus Taylor and Smith, 1945

Species of frog

Eleutherodactylus rubrimaculatus is a species of frog in the family Eleutherodactylidae. It is found in southeastern Pacific Chiapas, Mexico, and in the adjacent southwestern Guatemala. The specific name rubrimaculatus is Latin and means "spotted with red", and refers to the coloration of this species. Common names dusky chirping frog and red-spotted chirping frog have been coined for it.

== Description ==
Adult males measure 18–24 mm (0.71–0.94 in) and adult females (in a small sample) 19–23 mm (0.75–0.91 in) in snout–vent length. The tympanum is distinct and relatively large. The digital tips are scarcely expanded. The inner metatarsal tubercle is elongate and twice the size of the small, conical outer metatarsal tubercle. The dorsum is brown with small red spots. The venter is gray. Males have vocal slits.

== Habitat and conservation ==
Eleutherodactylus rubrimaculatus occurs in cloud forests to about 1,000 m (3,300 ft) above sea level. It is an abundant species within its restricted range, but habitat loss and alteration caused by agriculture and logging are major threats to it. It is found in Encrucijada and El Triunfo Biosphere Reserves in Mexico.
