= Eleutherodactylus bresslerae =

Conservation status
- Critically Endangered (IUCN 3.1)

Scientific classification
- Kingdom: Animalia
- Phylum: Chordata
- Class: Amphibia
- Order: Anura
- Clade: Brachycephaloidea
- Family: Eleutherodactylidae
- Genus: Eleutherodactylus
- Species: E. bresslerae

Binomial name
- Eleutherodactylus bresslerae Schwartz, 1960

Species of amphibian

Eleutherodactylus bresslerae is a species of frog in the family Eleutherodactylidae endemic to Cuba. Its natural habitats are subtropical or tropical moist lowland forest and rocky areas. It is threatened by habitat loss.
