= Eleutherodactylus teretistes =

Conservation status
- Vulnerable (IUCN 3.1)

Scientific classification
- Kingdom: Animalia
- Phylum: Chordata
- Class: Amphibia
- Order: Anura
- Family: Eleutherodactylidae
- Genus: Eleutherodactylus
- Species: E. teretistes

Binomial name
- Eleutherodactylus teretistes (Duellman, 1958)

Species of frog

Eleutherodactylus teretistes is a species of frog in the family Eleutherodactylidae. It is endemic to Mexico. Its natural habitat is subtropical or tropical dry forests. It is threatened by habitat loss.
