= Eleutherodactylus cavernicola =

Conservation status
- Critically Endangered (IUCN 3.1)

Scientific classification
- Kingdom: Animalia
- Phylum: Chordata
- Class: Amphibia
- Order: Anura
- Family: Eleutherodactylidae
- Genus: Eleutherodactylus
- Species: E. cavernicola

Binomial name
- Eleutherodactylus cavernicola Lynn, 1954

Species of frog

Eleutherodactylus cavernicola is a species of frog in the family Eleutherodactylidae endemic to Jamaica. Its natural habitats are subtropical or tropical moist lowland forest and caves. It is threatened by habitat loss.
