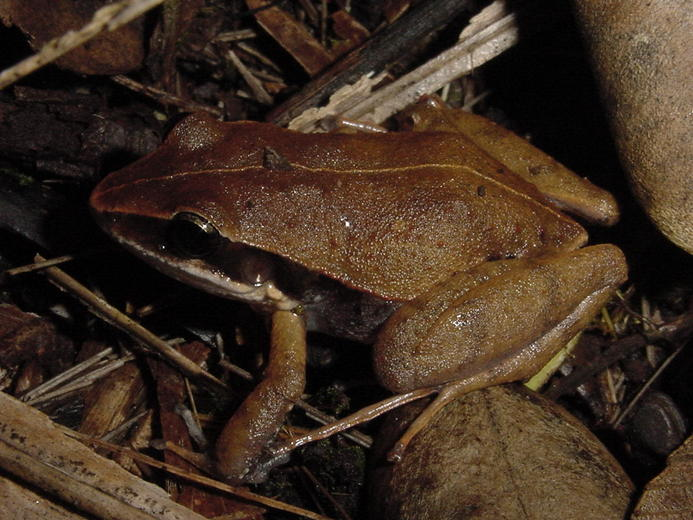

Conservation status
- Near Threatened (IUCN 3.1)

Scientific classification
- Kingdom: Animalia
- Phylum: Chordata
- Class: Amphibia
- Order: Anura
- Family: Eleutherodactylidae
- Genus: Eleutherodactylus
- Species: E. dimidiatus

Binomial name
- Eleutherodactylus dimidiatus (Cope, 1862)

= Eleutherodactylus dimidiatus =

Species of amphibian

Eleutherodactylus dimidiatus or the Miniature Robber Frog is a rare species of frog in the family Eleutherodactylidae endemic to Cuba. Its natural habitats are subtropical or tropical moist lowland forest and subtropical or tropical moist montane forest. The frog is a brownish colour allowing it to blend in with its forest habitat. It is threatened by habitat loss.
