= Eleutherodactylus albolabris =

Conservation status
- Least Concern (IUCN 3.1)

Scientific classification
- Kingdom: Animalia
- Phylum: Chordata
- Class: Amphibia
- Order: Anura
- Family: Eleutherodactylidae
- Genus: Eleutherodactylus
- Species: E. albolabris

Binomial name
- Eleutherodactylus albolabris (Taylor, 1943)

Synonyms
- Tomodactylus albolabris Taylor, 1943; Eleutherodactylus dixoni Lynch, 1991

Species of frog

Eleutherodactylus albolabris is a species of frog in the family Eleutherodactylidae. It is endemic to Mexico. Its natural habitat is subtropical or tropical moist lowland forest.

It is found in the Sierra Madre del Sur of Guerrero state, from 285 to 1,300 meters elevation, with an extent of occurrence (EOO) of 11,121 km^{2}. It has been collected at Agua del Obispo and south of Mazatlán, in the vicinity of Acahuizotla, and from the Sierra de Tecpan in western Guerrero east to San Luis Acatlán in eastern Guerrero.

It is threatened by habitat loss.
