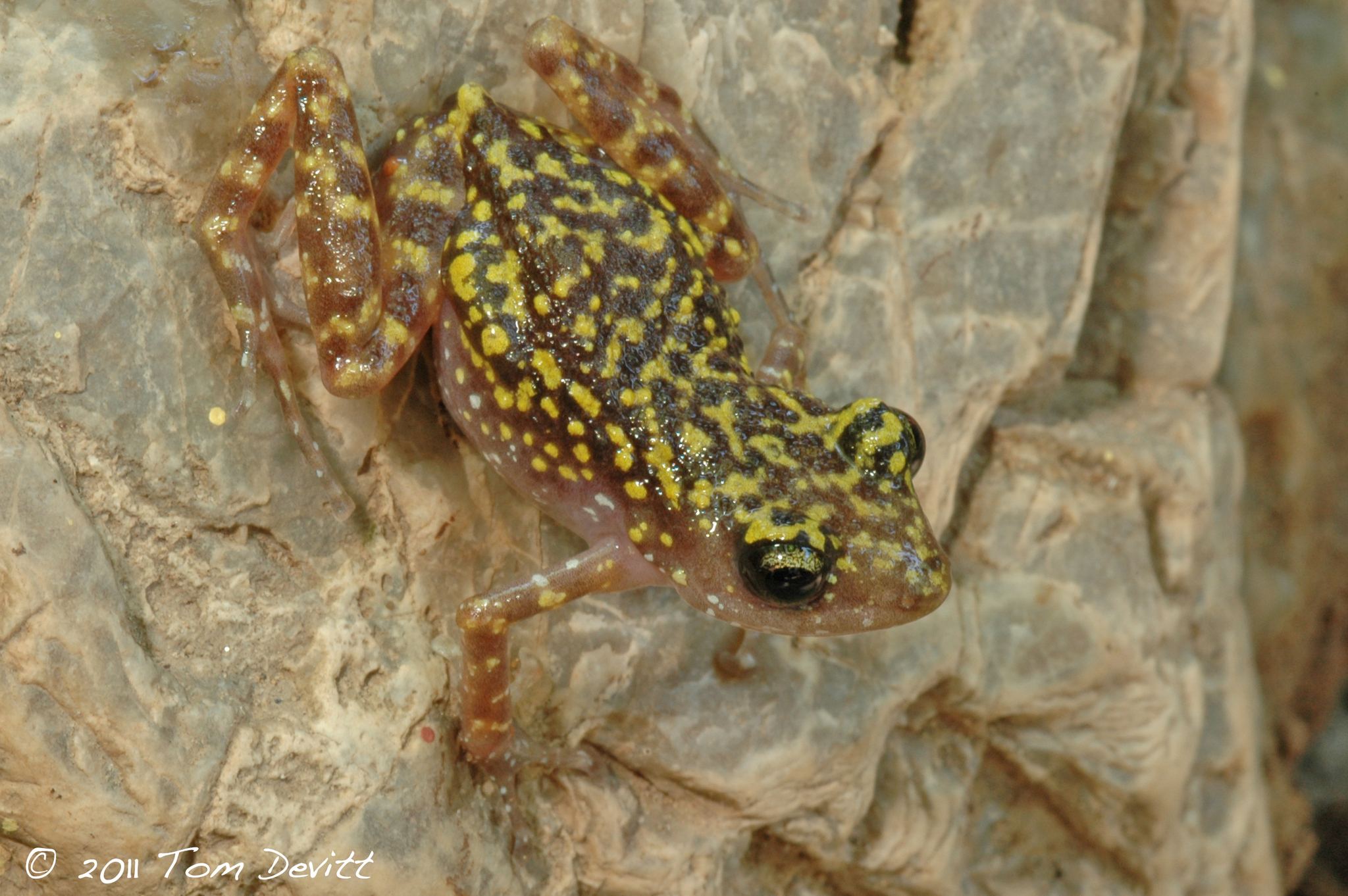

Conservation status
- Near Threatened (IUCN 3.1)

Scientific classification
- Kingdom: Animalia
- Phylum: Chordata
- Class: Amphibia
- Order: Anura
- Family: Eleutherodactylidae
- Genus: Eleutherodactylus
- Species: E. saxatilis

Binomial name
- Eleutherodactylus saxatilis (Webb, 1962)

= Eleutherodactylus saxatilis =

Species of frog

Eleutherodactylus saxatilis is a species of frog in the family Eleutherodactylidae. It is endemic to Mexico. Its natural habitats are subtropical or tropical moist lowland forests and rocky areas.

This species is locally abundant, and its population is considered to be stable but it is listed as Near Threatened since this species is range-restricted (to 1,289 km^{2}). Changing and intensifying agricultural practices may lead to loss and fragmentation of suitable habitats, which could drive the species to be Endangered.
