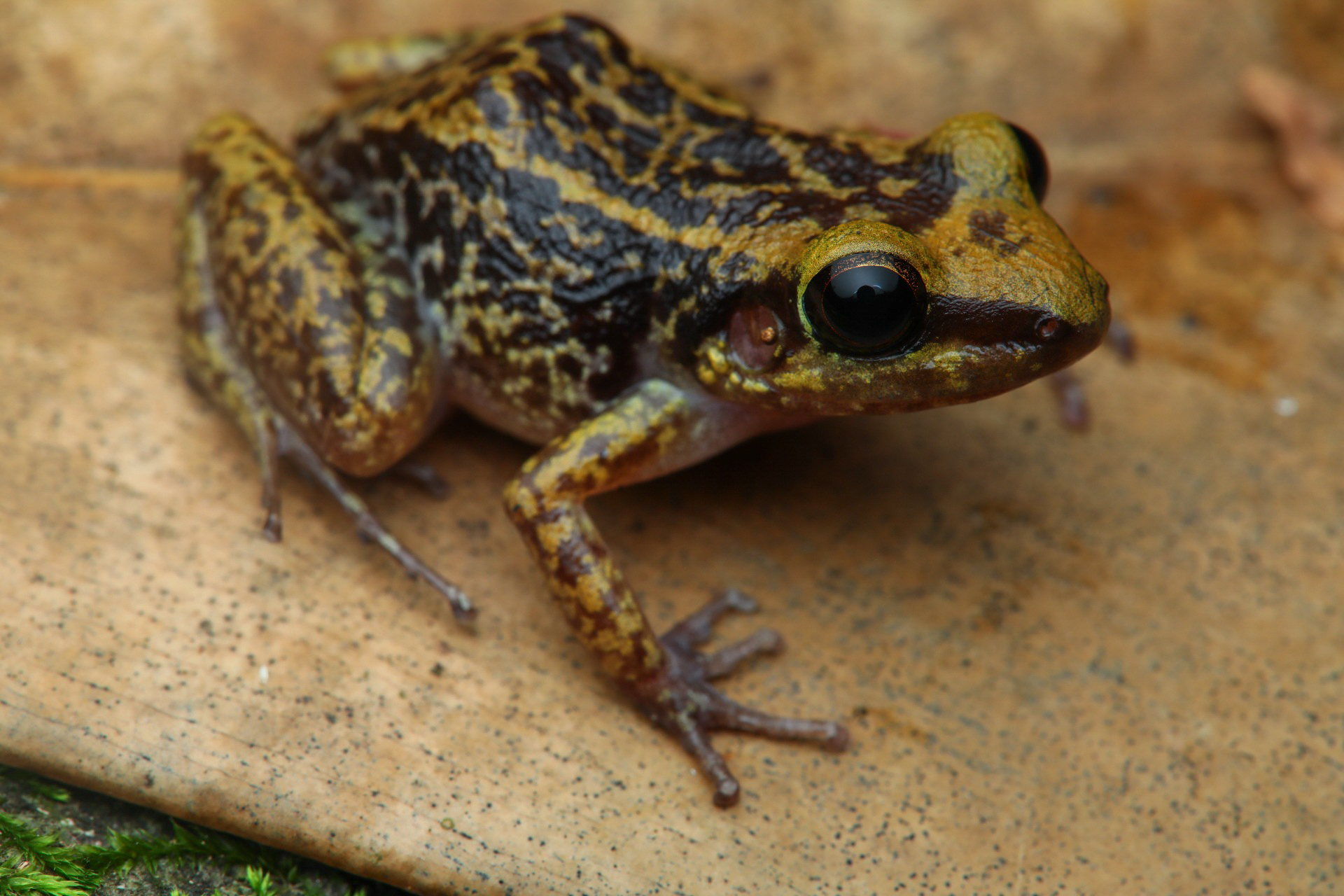

Conservation status
- Endangered (IUCN 3.1)

Scientific classification
- Kingdom: Animalia
- Phylum: Chordata
- Class: Amphibia
- Order: Anura
- Family: Eleutherodactylidae
- Genus: Eleutherodactylus
- Species: E. lentus

Binomial name
- Eleutherodactylus lentus (Cope, 1862)

Synonyms
- Hylodes lentus Cope, 1862; Hylodes riisei Reinhardt & Lütken, 1863

= Yellow mottled coqui =

Species of frog

The yellow-mottled coqui or mute coqui (Eleutherodactylus lentus) is a species of frog in the family Eleutherodactylidae endemic to the Virgin Islands. Its natural habitat is subtropical or tropical dry forests, often near streams or other moist habitats. It is threatened by habitat loss.

== Taxonomy ==
The yellow-mottled coqui was described as Hylodes lentus by the American biologist Edward Cope in 1862 based on a specimen from St. Thomas in the US Virgin Islands.

== Distribution and habitat ==
This species is endemic to the Virgin Islands, where it is found on St. Thomas, St. John, St. Croix, and Hassel Island in the US Virgin Islands, and on the island of Jost Van Dyke in the British Virgin Islands. The population on Jost Van Dyke was first recorded in 2007 and it is unclear whether it is introduced or was simply previously overlooked. It has been suggested that the species being introduced to the BVI is more likely, as several intensive herpetological surveys before 2007 failed to document this species and locals on the island were completely unaware of the species, despite knowing about several other Eleutherodactylus frogs native to Jost Van Dyke.

The yellow-mottled coqui prefers semi-xeric habitats, where it hides under debris. On Jost Van Dyke, it has been encountered in backyards sheltering under wooden boards and other objects, as well as freshwater puddles in garbage. On St. Thomas, it is known from agricultural areas. It is found from sea level up to an elevation of 10 m (33 ft).

Despite its common name, it can be heard calling occasionally, with vocalizing sometimes performed from under debris on the ground. It lays its eggs on the ground and is thought to reproduce via direct development.

== Conservation ==
The yellow-mottled coqui is classified as being endangered by the IUCN Red List due to its limited distribution (estimated to be 2,315 km^{2}) and ongoing habitat degradation in the US Virgin Islands. It was previously thought to be rare, but better knowledge of its ecology has increased encounter rates and it is known to be locally common in some places. Its population is currently decreasing due to habitat degradation. The species is known from the Virgin Islands National Park, which protects around two-thirds of St. John and nearly all of Hassel Island, but requires increased conservation on St. Thomas and St. Croix. The status of the population on Jost Van Dyke is uncertain; if that population is invasive, it has been suggested that the species be extirpated from the island to protect native frogs.
