= Eleutherodactylus andrewsi =

Conservation status
- Endangered (IUCN 3.1)

Scientific classification
- Kingdom: Animalia
- Phylum: Chordata
- Class: Amphibia
- Order: Anura
- Family: Eleutherodactylidae
- Genus: Eleutherodactylus
- Species: E. andrewsi

Binomial name
- Eleutherodactylus andrewsi Lynn, 1937

Species of frog

Eleutherodactylus andrewsi is a species of frog in the family Eleutherodactylidae endemic to Jamaica. Its natural habitats are subtropical or tropical moist lowland forest and subtropical or tropical moist montane forest. It is threatened by habitat loss.

It is approximately 3 cm long and found in the neotropics. The Eleutherodactylus andrewsi relies on saltation to move.
