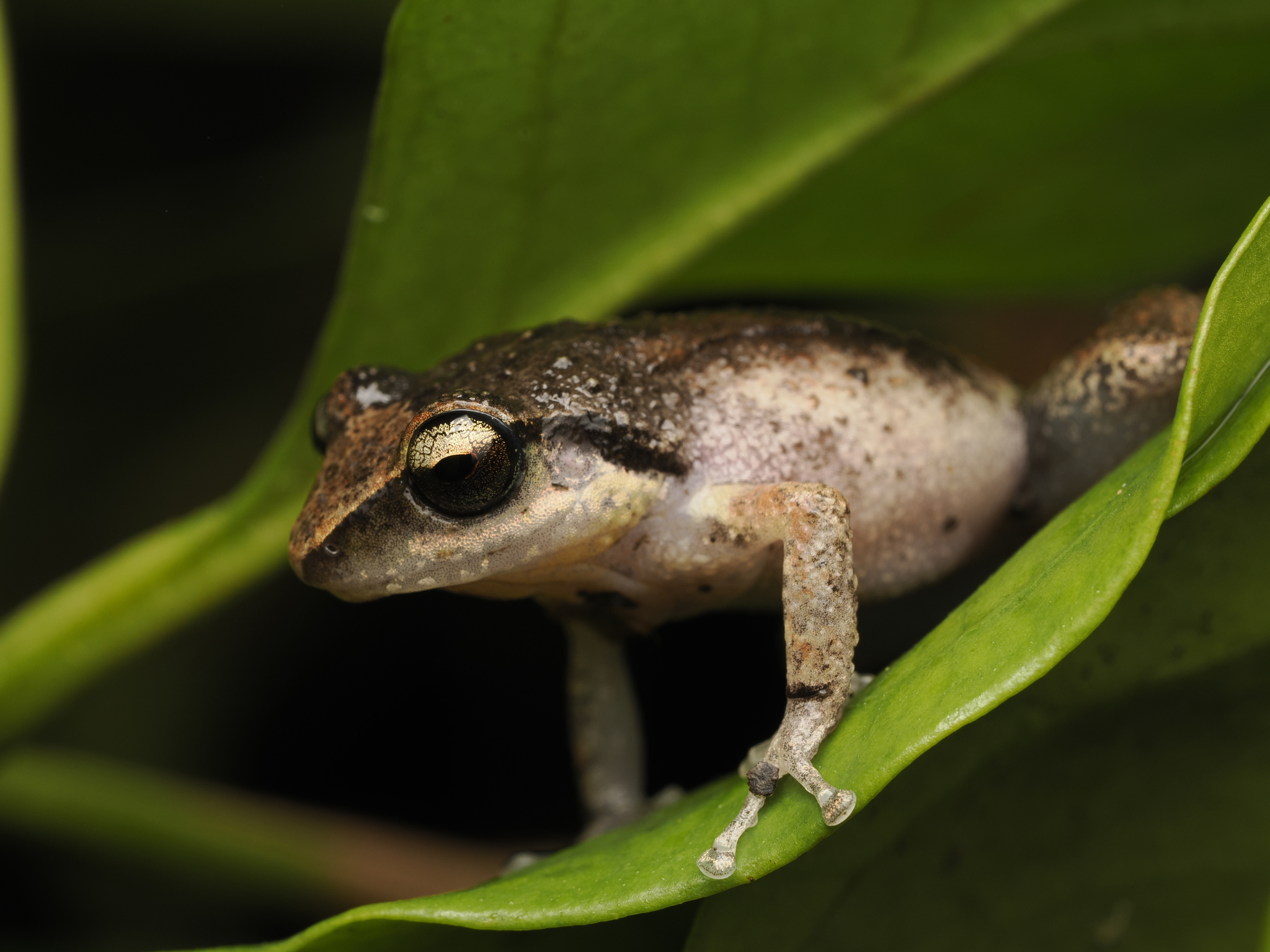

Conservation status
- Endangered (IUCN 3.1)

Scientific classification
- Kingdom: Animalia
- Phylum: Chordata
- Class: Amphibia
- Order: Anura
- Clade: Brachycephaloidea
- Family: Eleutherodactylidae
- Genus: Eleutherodactylus
- Species: E. notidodes

Binomial name
- Eleutherodactylus notidodes Schwartz, 1966

Synonyms
- Eleutherodactylus audanti notidodes Schwartz, 1966; Eleutherodactylus notidodes Lynch and Duellman, 1997

= Eleutherodactylus notidodes =

Species of amphibian

Eleutherodactylus notidodes, commonly called the Neiba telegraphic frog, is a species of frog in the family Eleutherodactylidae endemic to Hispaniola. It occurs in the Sierra de Neiba on the border between Haiti, and the Dominican Republic.

== Habitat and conservation ==
The species' natural habitats are upland closed-canopy forest and forest edges where it is found under rocks and debris. It likely cannot persist outside of mature, undisturbed forest habitat, and is thus threatened by deforestation for agriculture, timber harvesting, and charcoal manufacture.
