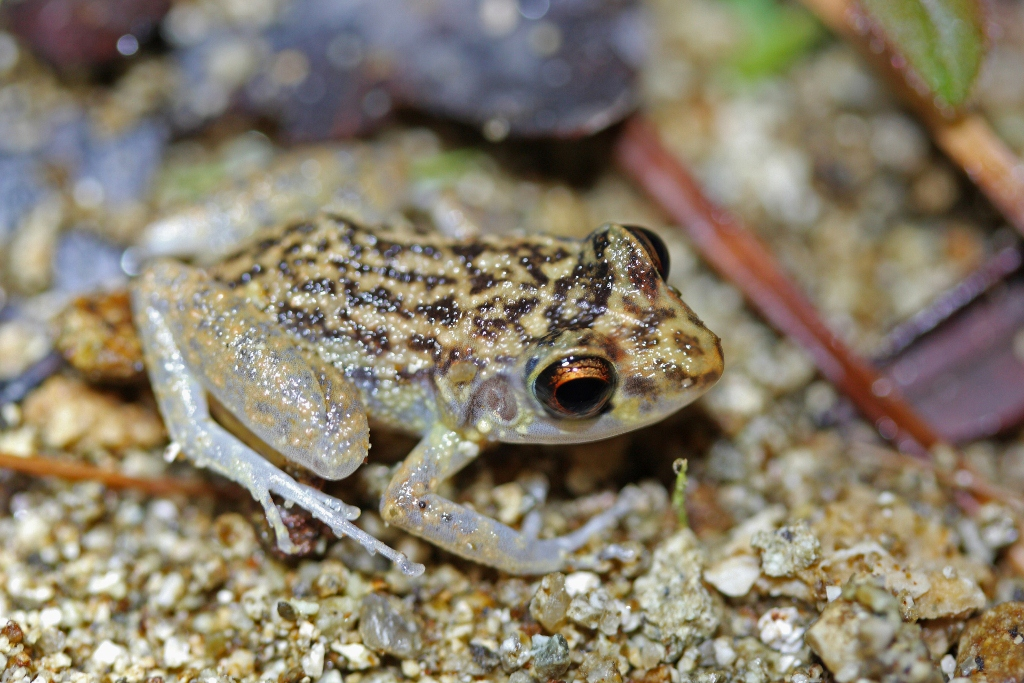

Conservation status
- Endangered (IUCN 3.1)

Scientific classification
- Kingdom: Animalia
- Phylum: Chordata
- Class: Amphibia
- Order: Anura
- Family: Eleutherodactylidae
- Genus: Eleutherodactylus
- Species: E. simulans

Binomial name
- Eleutherodactylus simulans Diaz & Fong, 2001

= Eleutherodactylus simulans =

Species of amphibian

Eleutherodactylus simulans (commonly known as the Oriente mottled frog) is a species of frog in the family Eleutherodactylidae endemic to Cuba. Its natural habitats are subtropical or tropical moist lowland forest and rivers. It is threatened by habitat loss.
