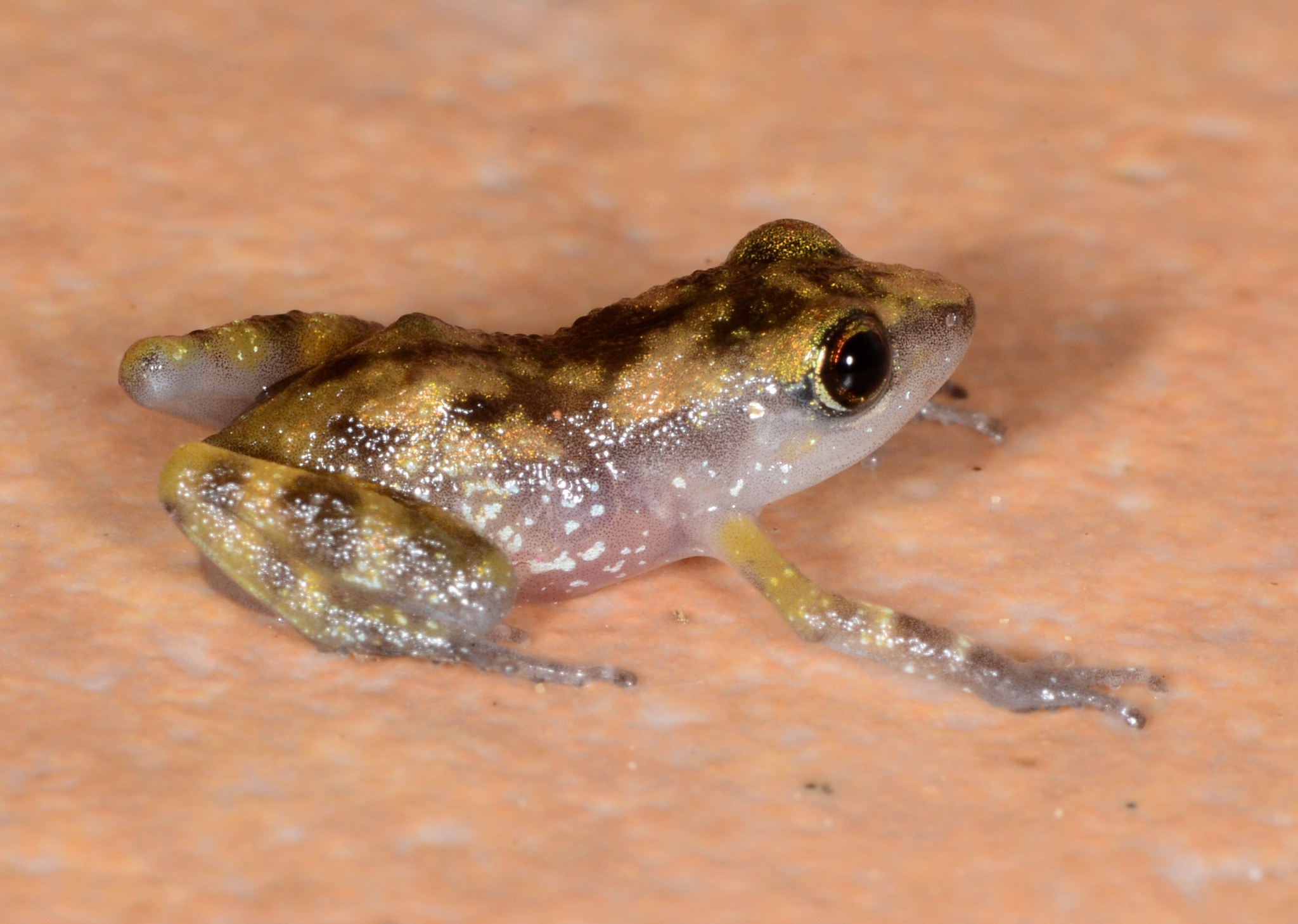

Conservation status
- Least Concern (IUCN 3.1)

Scientific classification
- Kingdom: Animalia
- Phylum: Chordata
- Class: Amphibia
- Order: Anura
- Family: Eleutherodactylidae
- Genus: Eleutherodactylus
- Species: E. pallidus

Binomial name
- Eleutherodactylus pallidus (Duellman, 1968)

= Eleutherodactylus pallidus =

Species of frog

Eleutherodactylus pallidus is a species of frog in the family Eleutherodactylidae. It is endemic to Mexico. Its natural habitats are subtropical or tropical dry forests and subtropical or tropical dry shrubland. It is threatened by habitat loss.
