= Eleutherodactylus alticola =

Conservation status
- Critically Endangered (IUCN 3.1)

Scientific classification
- Kingdom: Animalia
- Phylum: Chordata
- Class: Amphibia
- Order: Anura
- Family: Eleutherodactylidae
- Genus: Eleutherodactylus
- Species: E. alticola

Binomial name
- Eleutherodactylus alticola Lynn, 1937

Species of frog

Eleutherodactylus alticola is a species of frog in the family Eleutherodactylidae endemic to Jamaica. Its natural habitat is subtropical or tropical moist montane forest. It is threatened by habitat loss.
