= Eleutherodactylus varians =

Conservation status
- Vulnerable (IUCN 3.1)

Scientific classification
- Kingdom: Animalia
- Phylum: Chordata
- Class: Amphibia
- Order: Anura
- Family: Eleutherodactylidae
- Genus: Eleutherodactylus
- Species: E. varians

Binomial name
- Eleutherodactylus varians (Gundlach and Peters, 1864)

Synonyms
- Hylodes varians Gundlach and Peters in Peters, 1864

Species of amphibian

Eleutherodactylus varians is a species of frog in the family Eleutherodactylidae. It is endemic to Cuba and occurs in the central and eastern parts of the main island as well as on the Isla de Juventud. Common names cliff robber frog and Cuban bromeliad frog have been proposed for it. Eleutherodactylus olibrus and Eleutherodactylus staurometopon are sometimes included in this species as subspecies.

== Description ==
Eleutherodactylus varians can grow to 29 mm (1.1 in) in snout–vent length. The head is wider than it is long. The body is slightly depressed. The finger and toe tips bear discs. These frogs are able to change their coloration, and the dorsum ranges from silvery gray to yellowish brown to dark brown, with conspicuous spots. Males have a vocal sac that is typically yellow but may also be white.

== Habitat and conservation ==
Eleutherodactylus varians occurs in mesic forests at elevations below 845 m (2,772 ft). It is an arboreal species sometimes found in bromeliads. Males call from tree branches and leaves. The eggs are deposited in bromeliads. Development is direct (i.e., there is no free-living larval stage).

This species is moderately common in suitable habitat. It is threatened by habitat loss caused by agricultural activities. Its range overlaps with several protected areas (though these are in need of better conservation management).
