= Eleutherodactylus eileenae =

Conservation status
- Near Threatened (IUCN 3.1)

Scientific classification
- Kingdom: Animalia
- Phylum: Chordata
- Class: Amphibia
- Order: Anura
- Family: Eleutherodactylidae
- Genus: Eleutherodactylus
- Subgenus: Eleutherodactylus
- Species: E. eileenae

Binomial name
- Eleutherodactylus eileenae Dunn, 1926

Synonyms
- Eleutherodactylus gehrmanni Schwartz, 1958

Species of amphibian

Eleutherodactylus eileenae is a species of frog in the family Eleutherodactylidae. It is endemic to Cuba and is widespread in the western and central parts of the island. Common names Eileen's robber frog and Cuban free-fingered frog have been coined for it. It is named for "Eileen", but it is unknown who the person in question actually was.

== Description ==
Eleutherodactylus eileenae grow to 33 mm (1.3 in) in snout–vent length. The head is wider than the body. The finger and toe tips bear discs. The dorsum bears granules and tubercles, usually including two prominent suprascapular tubercles. The eyelids have prominent granules. The ventrum is granulated. Dorsal color is changeable: light brown, reddish brown, yellowish or dark brown. There are several dorsal patterns: suprascapular "W", two bands like inverted parentheses [")("], large reddish area in the anterior half of the body, flanks darker than the back, and a white or yellow middorsal stripe. Most specimens have a dark inter-orbital bar. The supratympanic fold is highlighted with black. The ventrum is white, but sometimes the throat is slightly brown with a clear medial line. Males have a vocal sac.

== Habitat and conservation ==
Eleutherodactylus eileenae occur in various types of closed-canopy mesic forests at elevations below 830 m (2,720 ft). They hide during the daytime in leaf litter, cracks, and holes, and become active by night. They are largely terrestrial, but calling males take perches on rocks and vegetation, typically 1–2 m (3–7 ft) above the ground, occasionally much higher. However, males guarding egg clutches may call from the ground. The eggs have direct development (i.e., there is no free-living larval stage).

Eleutherodactylus eileenae is a common and widespread species. Nevertheless, agricultural development, pollution, and infrastructure development for human settlement and tourism are threats to it. It is present in several protected areas.
