= Eleutherodactylus thomasi =

Conservation status
- Near Threatened (IUCN 3.1)

Scientific classification
- Kingdom: Animalia
- Phylum: Chordata
- Class: Amphibia
- Order: Anura
- Clade: Brachycephaloidea
- Family: Eleutherodactylidae
- Genus: Eleutherodactylus
- Species: E. thomasi

Binomial name
- Eleutherodactylus thomasi Schwartz, 1959

Species of amphibian

Eleutherodactylus thomasi is a species of frog in the family Eleutherodactylidae endemic to Cuba. Its natural habitats are subtropical or tropical moist lowland forest, rocky areas, and caves. It is threatened by habitat loss.
