= Eleutherodactylus dennisi =

Conservation status
- Least Concern (IUCN 3.1)

Scientific classification
- Kingdom: Animalia
- Phylum: Chordata
- Class: Amphibia
- Order: Anura
- Clade: Brachycephaloidea
- Family: Eleutherodactylidae
- Genus: Eleutherodactylus
- Species: E. dennisi

Binomial name
- Eleutherodactylus dennisi (Lynch, 1970)

Species of frog

Eleutherodactylus dennisi is a species of frog in the family Eleutherodactylidae. It is endemic to Mexico. Its natural habitats are subtropical or tropical moist lowland forests and caves. It is threatened by habitat loss.
