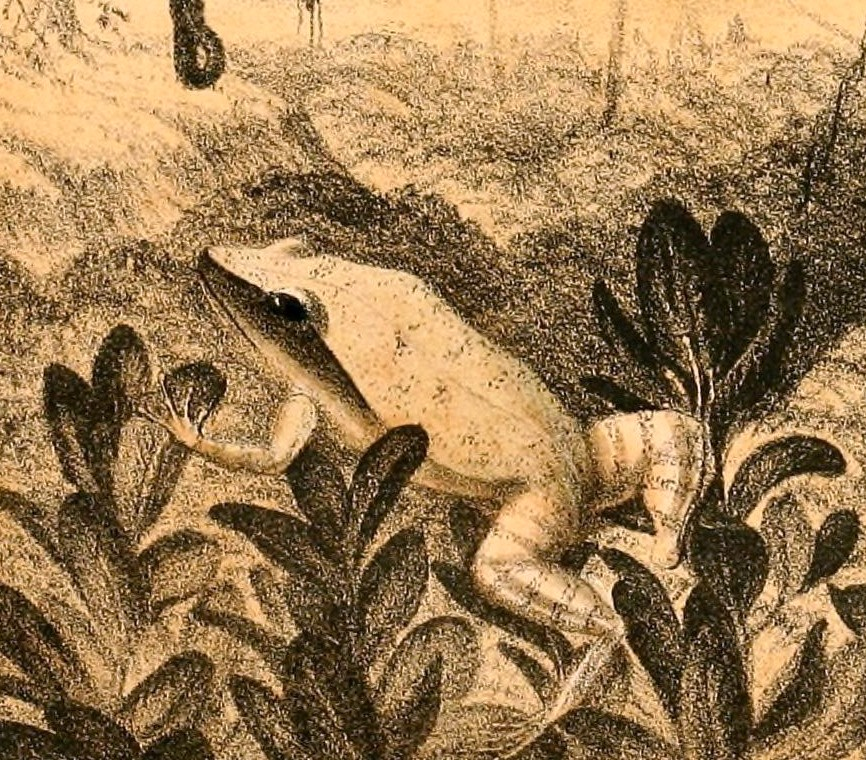

Conservation status
- Endangered (IUCN 3.1)

Scientific classification
- Kingdom: Animalia
- Phylum: Chordata
- Class: Amphibia
- Order: Anura
- Family: Eleutherodactylidae
- Genus: Eleutherodactylus
- Species: E. luteolus

Binomial name
- Eleutherodactylus luteolus (Gosse, 1851)

Synonyms
- Eleutherodactylus lewisi (Lynn & Dent, 1942)

= Eleutherodactylus luteolus =

Species of frog

Eleutherodactylus luteolus is a species of frog in the family Eleutherodactylidae endemic to Jamaica. Its natural habitat is subtropical or tropical moist lowland forest. It is threatened by habitat loss.

== Range description ==
This species has a restricted range in western Jamaica, ranging from sea level up to 680 m above sea level.

== Habitat and ecology ==
This species is an inhabitant of mesic forest on the coast and in the uplands; although associated with closed-canopy forest, it can tolerate some habitat degradation. Males call from the ground or from low vegetation. Eggs are laid on the ground and it breeds by direct development and may be associated with bromeliads.

== Population ==
It has rarely been encountered during the last decade, although it is commonly found in Dolphin Head in extreme western Jamaica. It has also been recently seen in Rocklands. Its population is decreasing; extensive habitat destruction and deforestation is taking place within its range, caused by agriculture, human settlement and logging. It occurs in several forest reserves, but these do not guarantee the species' long-term protection, and improved and strengthened management of these existing protected areas is clearly needed.
