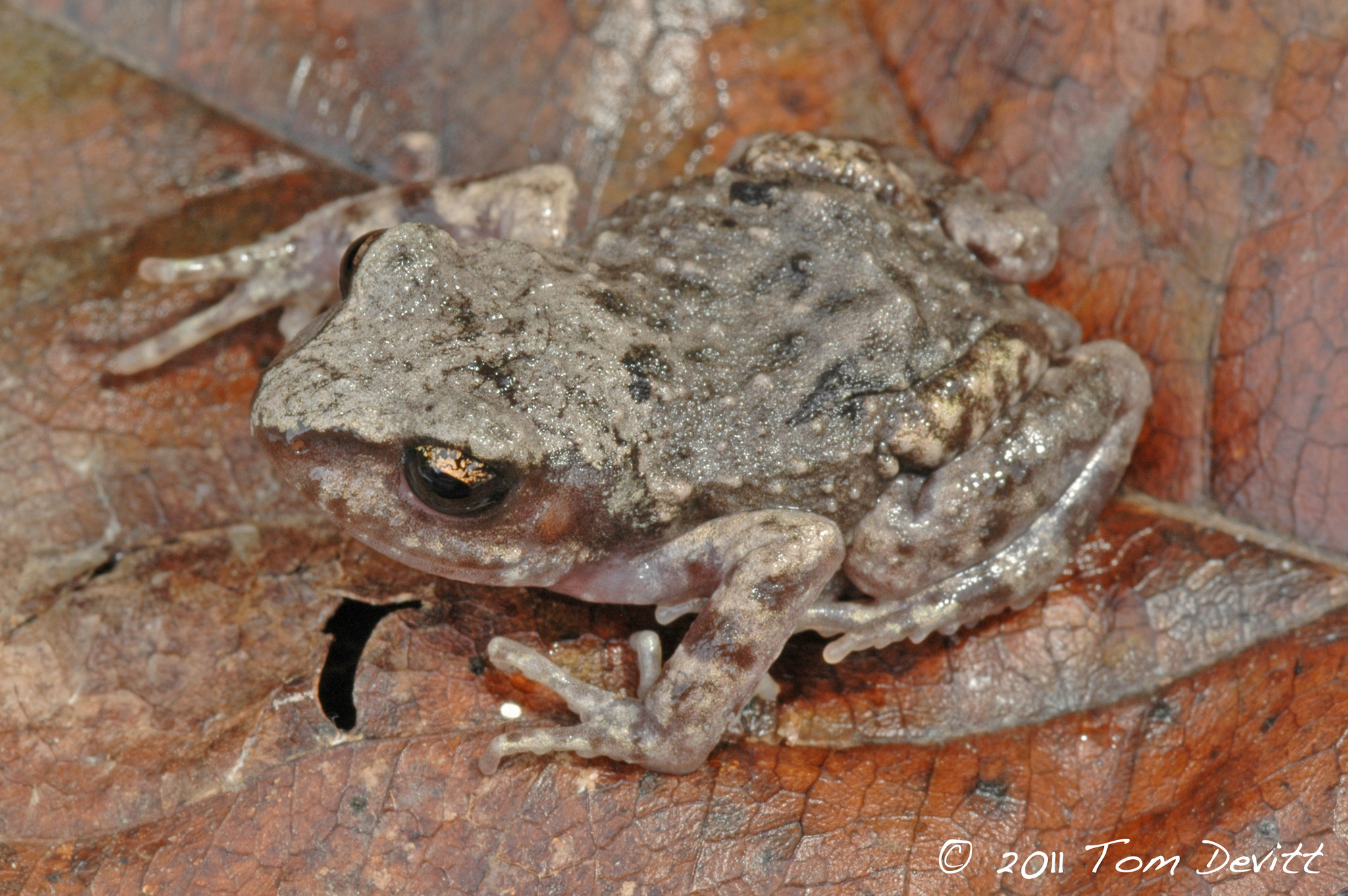

Conservation status
- Endangered (IUCN 3.1)

Scientific classification
- Kingdom: Animalia
- Phylum: Chordata
- Class: Amphibia
- Order: Anura
- Clade: Brachycephaloidea
- Family: Eleutherodactylidae
- Genus: Eleutherodactylus
- Subgenus: Syrrhophus
- Species: E. grandis

Binomial name
- Eleutherodactylus grandis (Dixon, 1957)

Synonyms
- Tomodactylus grandis Dixon, 1957

= Eleutherodactylus grandis =

Species of amphibian

Eleutherodactylus grandis, also known as the great peeping frog, is a species of frog in the family Eleutherodactylidae. It is endemic to Mexico and only known from near its type locality on the lava fields of Xitle volcano, in the southern part of the Mexico City federal district. Its natural habitat is shrubland. It is threatened by habitat loss caused by spreading of Mexico City. Little suitable habitat remains, and the species is thought to be restricted to the Pedregal Reserve.
