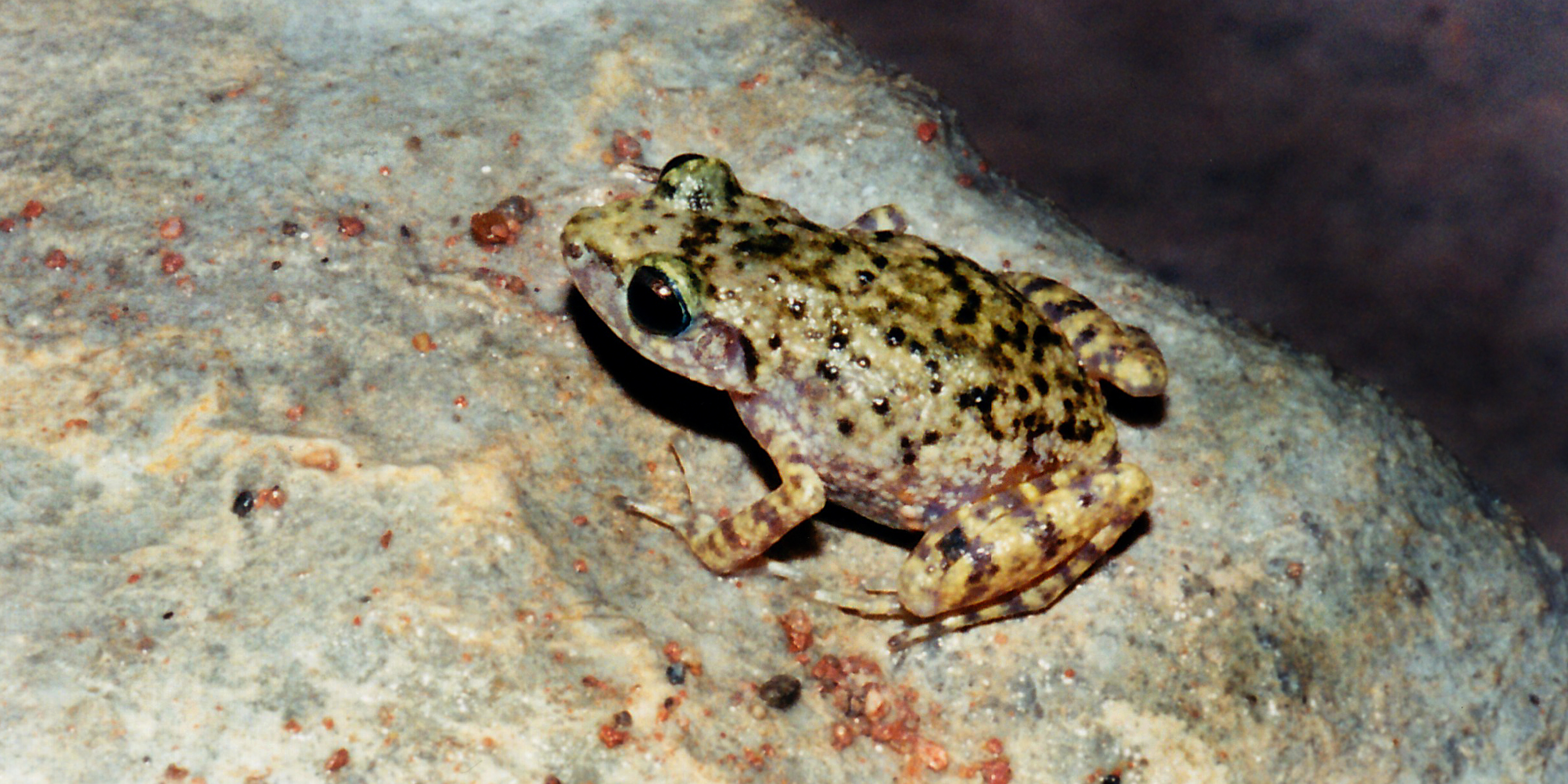
- Big-eared Chirping Frog, Palmillas, Tamaulipas, Mexico (11 July 2004)

Conservation status
- Least Concern (IUCN 3.1)

Scientific classification
- Kingdom: Animalia
- Phylum: Chordata
- Class: Amphibia
- Order: Anura
- Family: Eleutherodactylidae
- Genus: Eleutherodactylus
- Species: E. verrucipes

Binomial name
- Eleutherodactylus verrucipes (Cope, 1885)

= Eleutherodactylus verrucipes =

Species of frog

Eleutherodactylus verrucipes is a species of frog in the family Eleutherodactylidae. It is endemic to Mexico. Its natural habitats are subtropical or tropical moist lowland forests and subtropical or tropical moist montane forests. It is threatened by habitat loss.
