= Eleutherodactylus pituinus =

Conservation status
- Endangered (IUCN 3.1)

Scientific classification
- Kingdom: Animalia
- Phylum: Chordata
- Class: Amphibia
- Order: Anura
- Family: Eleutherodactylidae
- Genus: Eleutherodactylus
- Subgenus: Eleutherodactylus
- Species: E. pituinus

Binomial name
- Eleutherodactylus pituinus Schwartz, 1965

Species of frog

Eleutherodactylus pituinus is a species of frog in the family Eleutherodactylidae endemic to the Cordillera Central, Dominican Republic, at elevations of 1,212–1,770 m (3,976–5,807 ft) asl. Its natural habitats are upland pinewoods and forests. It is threatened by habitat loss caused by agriculture and by disturbance from ecotourism. Also chytridiomycosis is a threat.
