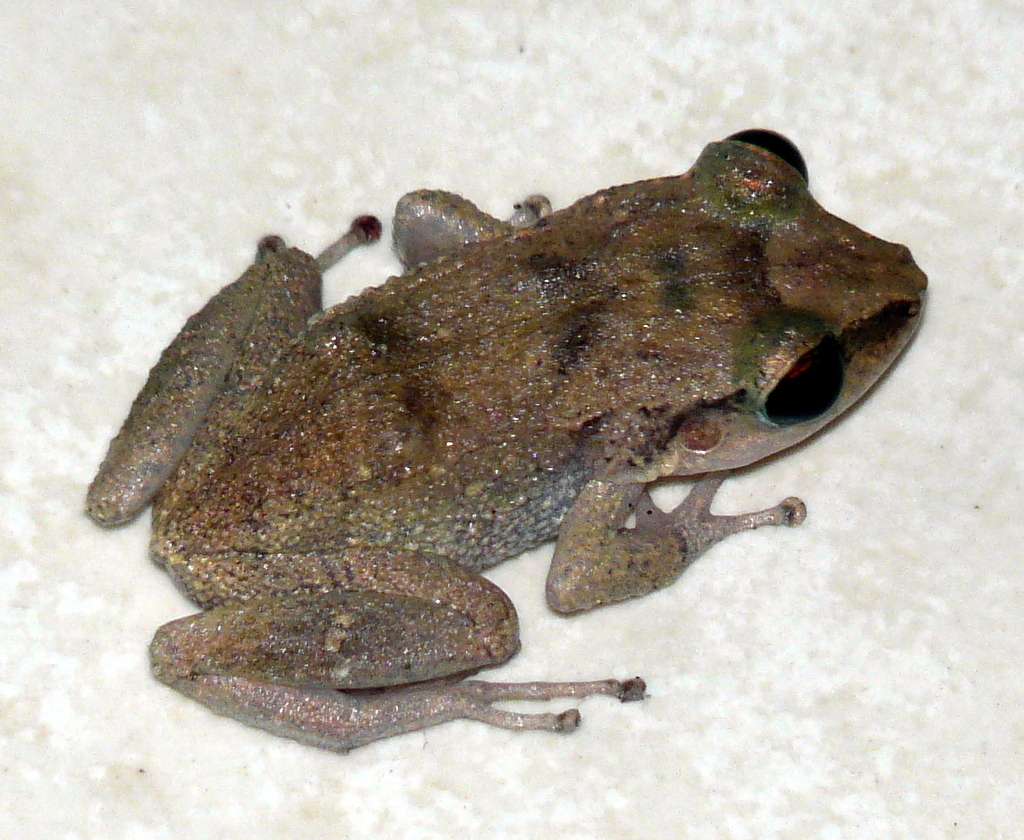

Conservation status
- Vulnerable (IUCN 3.1)

Scientific classification
- Kingdom: Animalia
- Phylum: Chordata
- Class: Amphibia
- Order: Anura
- Family: Eleutherodactylidae
- Genus: Eleutherodactylus
- Subgenus: Euhyas
- Species: E. gossei

Binomial name
- Eleutherodactylus gossei Dunn, 1926

Synonyms
- Euhyas gossei (Dunn, 1926)

= Eleutherodactylus gossei =

Species of frog

Eleutherodactylus gossei is a species of frog in the family Eleutherodactylidae. It is endemic to Jamaica where it is widespread. An introduced population existed in Bermuda but appears to have been extirpated. The specific name gossei honors Philip Henry Gosse, an English naturalist, missionary, and science writer. Its common names are Jamaican forest frog and Spaldings robber frog, the latter apparently after Spaldings, its type locality.

== Subspecies ==
Two subspecies are recognized:

- Eleutherodactylus gossei gossei Dunn, 1926
- Eleutherodactylus gossei oligaulax Schwartz and Fowler, 1973

== Description ==
Adult Eleutherodactylus gossei gossei males measure 21–28 mm (0.8–1.1 in) and females 20–34 mm (0.8–1.3 in) in snout–vent length. The most common pattern of the dorsum is mottled or unicolor, depending on the area. Specimens with dorsolateral stripes, middorsal hairline, or purple stripes are less frequent. The ground color is a shade of brown, ranging from rich reddish brown to tan. The venter is usually creamy to faintly yellowish, whereas the throat is highly variable. The groin and the concealed surfaces are red (or pink) to orange.

Eleutherodactylus gossei oligaulax is only found in extreme eastern parts of Jamaica and is smaller than the nominotypical subspecies. Males grow to a snout–vent length of 23 mm (0.91 in) and females to 26 mm (1.0 in). Most individual have a middorsal hairline in their dorsum or are unicolor. Individuals with dorsolateral stripes are common whereas mottled individuals are rare.

== Habitat and conservation ==
Eleutherodactylus gossei occurs in a variety of mesic habitats, including rural gardens and former forests, at elevations below 1,515 m (4,970 ft). It is widespread and can be common in suitable habitat. It is threatened by habitat loss caused by, for example, intensive agricultural practices and infrastructure development. It occurs in the Blue and John Crow Mountains National Park and in some forest reserves.
