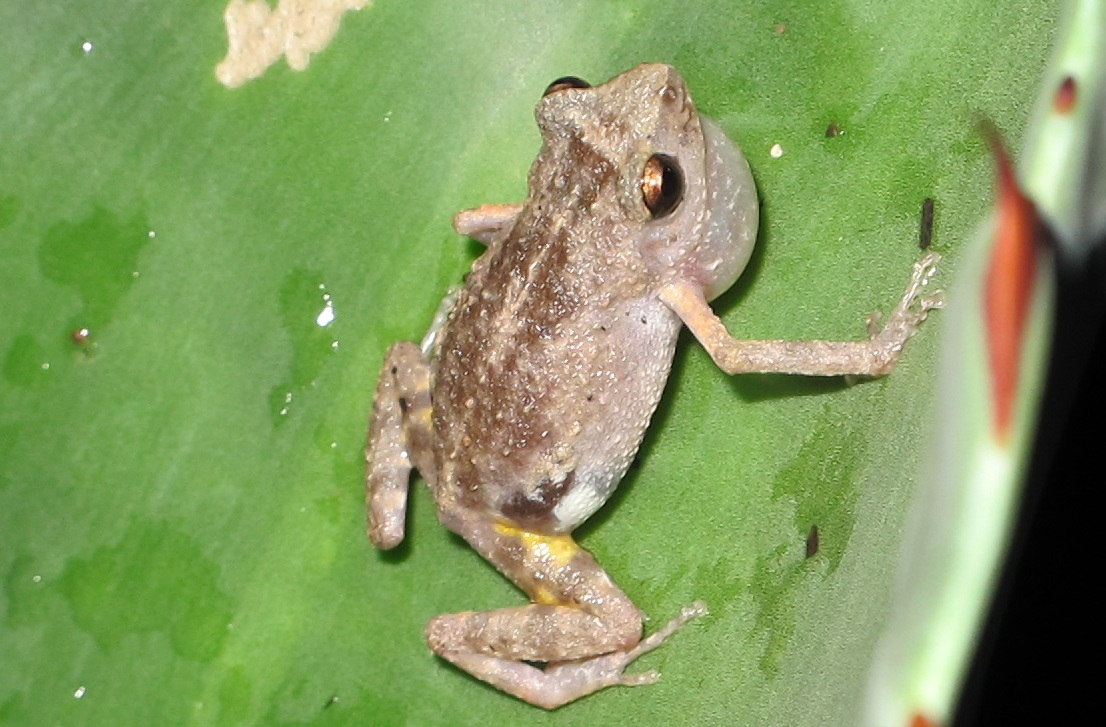

Conservation status
- Least Concern (IUCN 3.1)

Scientific classification
- Kingdom: Animalia
- Phylum: Chordata
- Class: Amphibia
- Order: Anura
- Clade: Brachycephaloidea
- Family: Eleutherodactylidae
- Genus: Eleutherodactylus
- Subgenus: Syrrhophus
- Species: E. dilatus

Binomial name
- Eleutherodactylus dilatus (Davis and Dixon, 1955)

Synonyms
- Tomodactylus dilatus Davis and Dixon, 1955; Syrrhophus dilatus (Davis and Dixon, 1955)

= Eleutherodactylus dilatus =

Species of amphibian

Eleutherodactylus dilatus is a species of frog in the family Eleutherodactylidae. It is endemic to Mexico and restricted to the Chilpancingo region of the Sierra Madre del Sur in central Guerrero. Its common name is Guerreran peeping frog.

== Description ==
Specimens in the type series measured 25–30 mm (0.98–1.18 in) in snout–vent length, with the single female being larger than the males. The tympanum is small, up to 1 mm in males and 1.5 mm the female, and sometimes indistinct. The canthus appears sharply angled. The dorsum is pustulate and lavender to brownish in color, with black mottling. The venter is granular and varies from nearly white to heavily pigmented and with numerous white subcircular spots. There is usually a distinct, dark loreal stripe running from the nostril to the eye and continuing posteriorly onto the shoulder. There are large ochraceous spots anterior proximal face of the femur as well as posteriorly in the bend of the knee. The tibia have three, sometimes two transverse bars. The tips of the two outer fingers are truncate and laterally dilated (having almost twice the width of the subterminal phalanges—hence the specific name dilatus).

Male advertisement call is a "peep" and "trill", sometimes a five-note trill.

== Habitat and conservation ==
The species' natural habitats are pine-oak forests and crops in the forests. The specimens in the type series were found at an elevation of 2,400 m (7,800 ft) above sea level. They were collected at night from small shrubs and pines some 0.6–2 m (2–7 ft) above ground.

Eleutherodactylus dilatus is an uncommon species. It is threatened by loss and disturbance of its forest habitat. It receives a degree of protection in the Omiltemi Park, referred to as the Omiltemi State Park in recent sources.
