= Eleutherodactylus casparii =

Conservation status
- Endangered (IUCN 3.1)

Scientific classification
- Kingdom: Animalia
- Phylum: Chordata
- Class: Amphibia
- Order: Anura
- Clade: Brachycephaloidea
- Family: Eleutherodactylidae
- Genus: Eleutherodactylus
- Species: E. casparii

Binomial name
- Eleutherodactylus casparii Dunn, 1926

Synonyms
- Eleutherodactylus ricordii ssp. casparii Dunn, 1926; Eleutherodactylus planirostris ssp. casparii Dunn, 1926

Species of amphibian

Eleutherodactylus casparii is a species of frog in the family Eleutherodactylidae endemic to Sierra de Trinidad, Cienfuegos Province, Cuba. Its natural habitat is mesic forest, but it also occurs in anthropogenic habitats such as plantations and in introduced vegetation. It is threatened by habitat loss.
