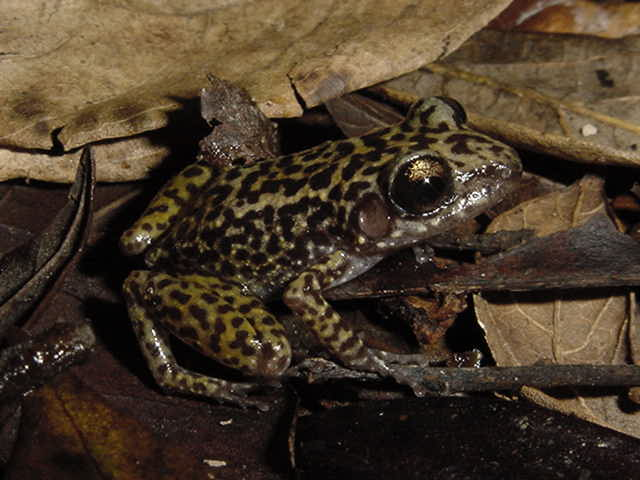

Conservation status
- Vulnerable (IUCN 3.1)

Scientific classification
- Kingdom: Animalia
- Phylum: Chordata
- Class: Amphibia
- Order: Anura
- Family: Eleutherodactylidae
- Genus: Eleutherodactylus
- Species: E. ricordii

Binomial name
- Eleutherodactylus ricordii (Duméril and Bibron, 1841)

Synonyms
- Hylodes ricordii Duméril and Bibron, 1841

= Eleutherodactylus ricordii =

Species of amphibian

Eleutherodactylus ricordii is a species of frog in the family Eleutherodactylidae endemic to Cuba. Its natural habitats are subtropical or tropical moist lowland forest, subtropical or tropical moist montane forest, and rocky areas. It is threatened by habitat loss.
