= Eleutherodactylus emiliae =

Conservation status
- Endangered (IUCN 3.1)

Scientific classification
- Kingdom: Animalia
- Phylum: Chordata
- Class: Amphibia
- Order: Anura
- Family: Eleutherodactylidae
- Genus: Eleutherodactylus
- Subgenus: Euhyas
- Species: E. emiliae

Binomial name
- Eleutherodactylus emiliae Dunn, 1926

Synonyms
- Euhyas emiliae (Dunn, 1926)

Species of amphibian

Eleutherodactylus emiliae is a species of frog in the family Eleutherodactylidae. It is endemic to central Cuba and known from the Escambray and Banao Mountains. The species is named for "Emilia", but it is not known who the person in question was. Common name Emilia's robber frog has been coined for it.

== Description ==
The holotype, a female, measures 27 mm (1.1 in) in snout–vent length, and this is also given as the maximum size for the species. The body has a robust and compact appearance. The head is wider than it is long. The snout is short. The tympanum is visible. Digital discs are weakly developed. Skin is dorsally smooth or slightly granular and ventrally smooth. Dorsal coloration is grayish, cream, dark brown, or yellowish brown; a pale thin vertebral line is often present. The sides of the head are dark, mask-like. The inner sides of the thighs can be red, as in the holotype.

== Habitat and conservation ==
Eleutherodactylus emiliae occurs in closed-canopy, humid forests at elevations of 350–850 m (1,150–2,790 ft) above sea level. It is a terrestrial species that can be found under rocks, trunks, and among the rhizomes of tree ferns. Eggs are deposited on the ground. Development is direct, without free-living larval stage.

It is an uncommon species. It is threatened by habitat loss and disturbance caused by agriculture and tourism. It is known from a few protected areas, but these are not providing adequate protection.
