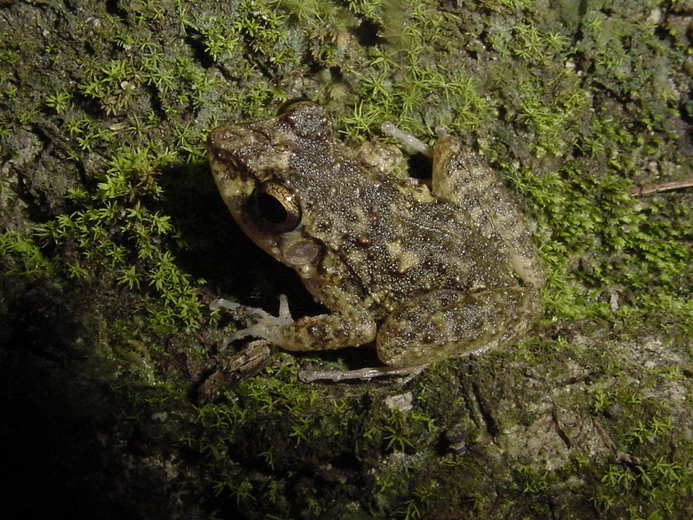

Conservation status
- Least Concern (IUCN 3.1)

Scientific classification
- Kingdom: Animalia
- Phylum: Chordata
- Class: Amphibia
- Order: Anura
- Family: Eleutherodactylidae
- Genus: Eleutherodactylus
- Species: E. cuneatus

Binomial name
- Eleutherodactylus cuneatus (Cope, 1862)

Synonyms
- Eleutherodactylus brevipalmatus (Schmidt, 1920); Eleutherodactylus sierra-maestrae (Schmidt, 1920)

= Eleutherodactylus cuneatus =

Species of amphibian

Eleutherodactylus cuneatus is a species of frog in the family Eleutherodactylidae endemic to Cuba. Its natural habitats are subtropical or tropical moist lowland forest, subtropical or tropical moist montane forest, subtropical or tropical moist shrubland, subtropical or tropical seasonally wet or flooded lowland grassland, rivers, arable land, pastureland, plantations, rural gardens, urban areas, heavily degraded former forest, and seasonally flooded agricultural land.
