= Eleutherodactylus leberi =

Conservation status
- Endangered (IUCN 3.1)

Scientific classification
- Kingdom: Animalia
- Phylum: Chordata
- Class: Amphibia
- Order: Anura
- Clade: Brachycephaloidea
- Family: Eleutherodactylidae
- Genus: Eleutherodactylus
- Species: E. leberi

Binomial name
- Eleutherodactylus leberi Schwartz, 1965

Species of amphibian

Eleutherodactylus leberi is a species of frog in the family Eleutherodactylidae, endemic to Cuba. Its natural habitat is closed mesic forest, including wet limestone forest. It is threatened by habitat loss.
