= Piping peeping frog =

Conservation status
- Least Concern (IUCN 3.1)

Scientific classification
- Kingdom: Animalia
- Phylum: Chordata
- Class: Amphibia
- Order: Anura
- Family: Eleutherodactylidae
- Genus: Eleutherodactylus
- Species: E. syristes

Binomial name
- Eleutherodactylus syristes (Hoyt, 1965)

Species of amphibian

The piping peeping frog (Eleutherodactylus syristes) is a species of frog in the family Eleutherodactylidae. It is endemic to Mexico. Its natural habitat is subtropical or tropical moist lowland forests. It is threatened by habitat loss.
