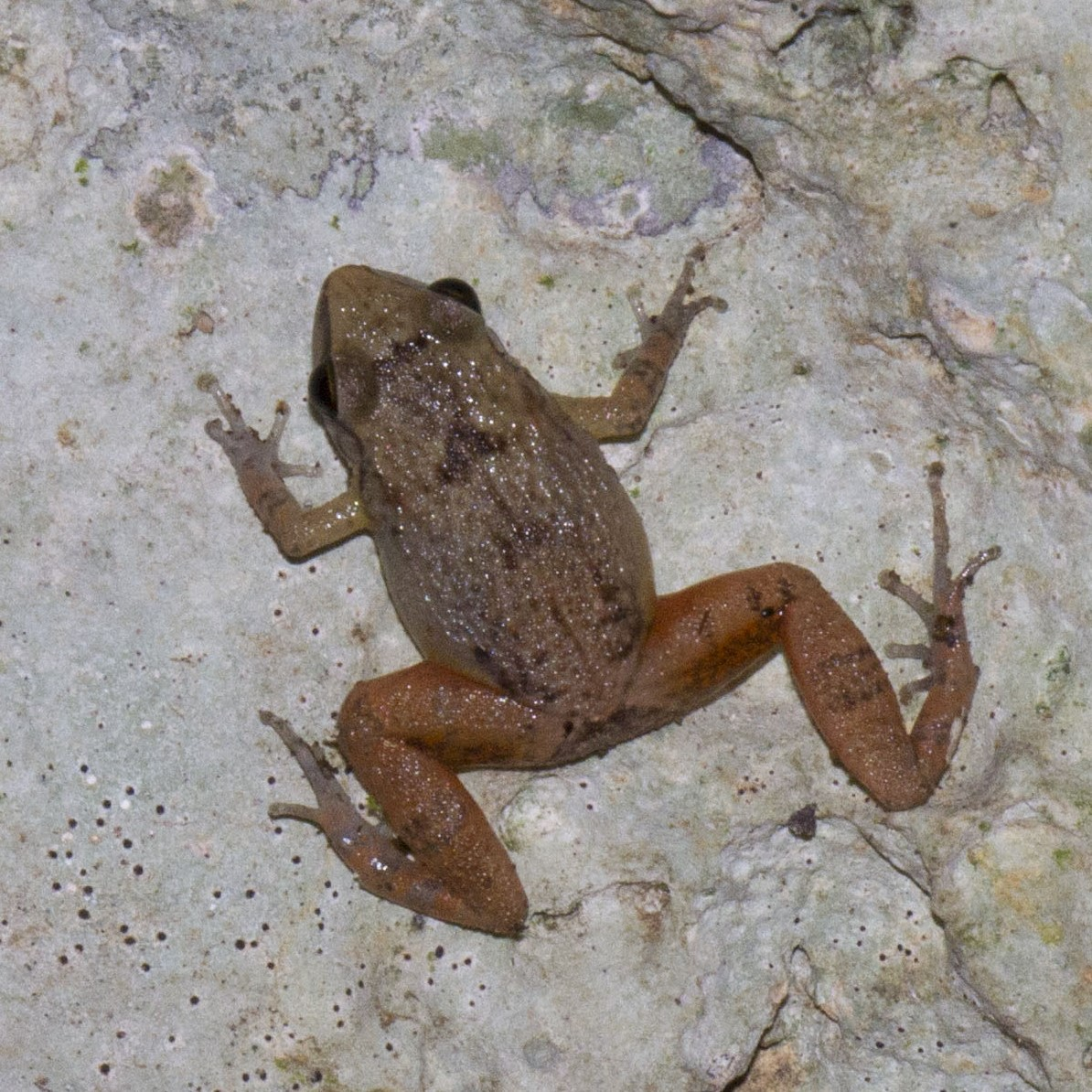

Conservation status
- Endangered (IUCN 3.1)

Scientific classification
- Kingdom: Animalia
- Phylum: Chordata
- Class: Amphibia
- Order: Anura
- Family: Eleutherodactylidae
- Genus: Eleutherodactylus
- Subgenus: Euhyas
- Species: E. zugi

Binomial name
- Eleutherodactylus zugi Schwartz, 1958

Synonyms
- Euhyas zugi (Schwartz, 1958)

= Eleutherodactylus zugi =

Species of amphibian

Eleutherodactylus zugi, also known as Rosario red-legged frog and Zug's robber frog, is a species of frog in the family Eleutherodactylidae. The species is endemic to western Cuba and is known from Pinar del Río and Artemisa provinces. The specific name zugi honors American herpetologist George R. Zug. Eleutherodactylus erythroproctus was originally described as a subspecies of Eleutherodactylus zugi, and is sometimes still treated as such.

== Description ==
E. zugi is a small species: adult males measure 12–17 mm (0.5–0.7 in) and adult females 13–19 mm (0.5–0.7 in) in snout–vent length. The snout is rather acute. The tympanum is visible and larger in females than in males of the same size. The fingers and toes are short and have no webbing. The dorsum is warty, including a raised middorsal line. The throat and the venter are smooth. There are three basic color patterns. The first type has a dark brown to tan middorsal zone that is bounded by a broad yellow or orange dorsolateral stripe. The second type has a pair of dorsolateral stripes that end dorsally, and a thin middorsal line. The third type has a mottled dorsum, without indications of dorsolateral bands or stripes.

== Habitat and conservation ==
E. zugi occurs in mesic broadleaf forests at elevations of 155–390 m (509–1,280 ft) above sea level. The type series was collected from wet shrubs few inches above the ground, and under less wet conditions, under palm trash and other debris. At night it may climb on moist rocks. The eggs are deposited on the ground. Development is direct, without free-living larval stage.

E. zugi is a rare species with a restricted range. It is threatened by habitat loss caused by agriculture, infrastructure development, and tourism. Agricultural pollution may also be a threat. The range of this species overlaps with several protected areas, but many of these would require improved management.
