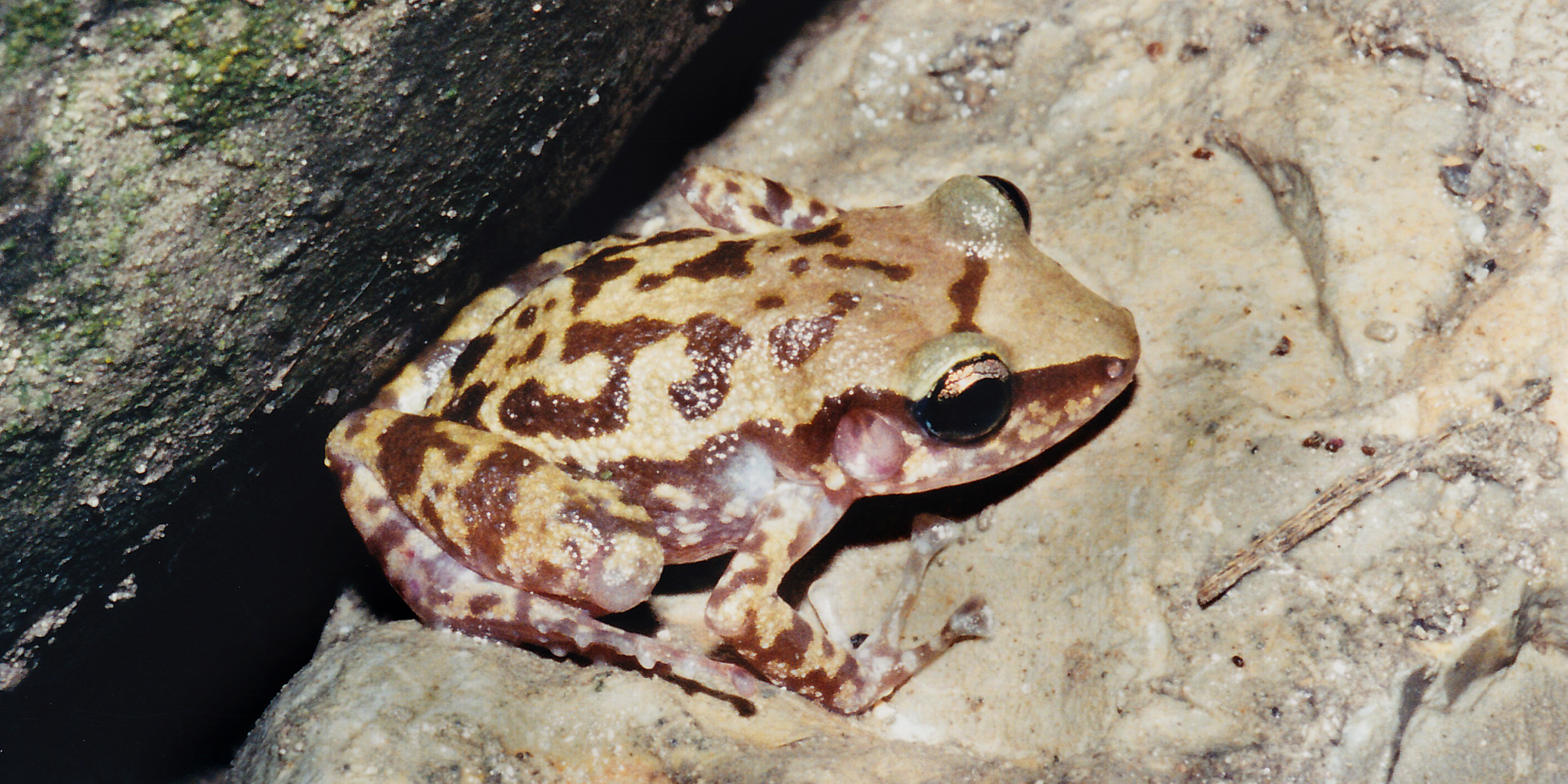
- Long-footed Chirping Frog, Victoria, Tamaulipas, Mexico (12 July 2004)

Conservation status
- Least Concern (IUCN 3.1)

Scientific classification
- Kingdom: Animalia
- Phylum: Chordata
- Class: Amphibia
- Order: Anura
- Family: Eleutherodactylidae
- Genus: Eleutherodactylus
- Subgenus: Syrrhophus
- Species: E. longipes

Binomial name
- Eleutherodactylus longipes (Baird, 1859)

Synonyms
- Batrachyla longipes Baird, 1859; Epirhexis longipes (Baird, 1859); Hylodes longipes (Baird, 1859); Syrrhophus latodactylus Taylor, 1940 "1939"; Eleutherodactylus latodactylus (Taylor, 1940)

= Eleutherodactylus longipes =

Species of frog

Eleutherodactylus longipes is a species of frog in the family Eleutherodactylidae. It is endemic to Mexico and occurs on the Sierra Madre Oriental between central Nuevo León and adjacent Coahuila in the north and northern Hidalgo in the south. It is also known as the long-footed chirping frog and longfoot robber frog, among other names.

Eleutherodactylus longipes occurs in pine-oak forests at elevations of 650–2,000 m (2,130–6,560 ft) above sea level. Several records are from caves. It is threatened by habitat loss caused by logging. Chytridiomycosis remains a potential threat. It might be present in the Cumbres de Monterrey National Park.
