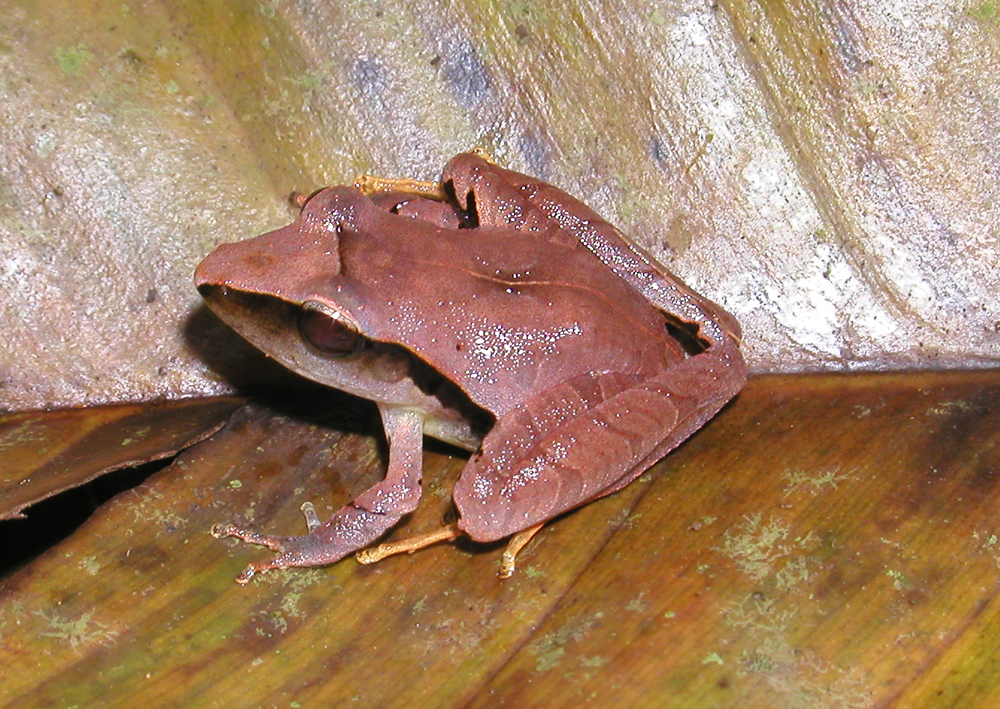
- Eleutherodactylus mimus

Scientific classification
- Kingdom: Animalia
- Phylum: Chordata
- Class: Amphibia
- Order: Anura
- Family: Eleutherodactylidae
- Subfamily: Eleutherodactylinae
- Genus: Eleutherodactylus; Duméril and Bibron, 1841

Species
- Many, see text.

Synonyms
- Euhyas Fitzinger, 1843; Epirhexis Cope, 1866 (Suppressed); Syrrhophus Cope, 1878; Malachylodes Cope, 1879; Syrrhopus Boulenger, 1888 (Missp.); Syrrhaphus Günther, 1900 (Missp.); Tomodactylus Günther, 1900; Sminthillus Barbour & Noble, 1920; Ladailadne Dubois, 1987; Pelorius Hedges, 1989; Schwartzius Hedges, Duellman, & Heinicke, 2008

= Eleutherodactylus =

Eleutherodactylus Temporal range: Early Oligocene to present, 29–0 Ma

Genus of amphibians

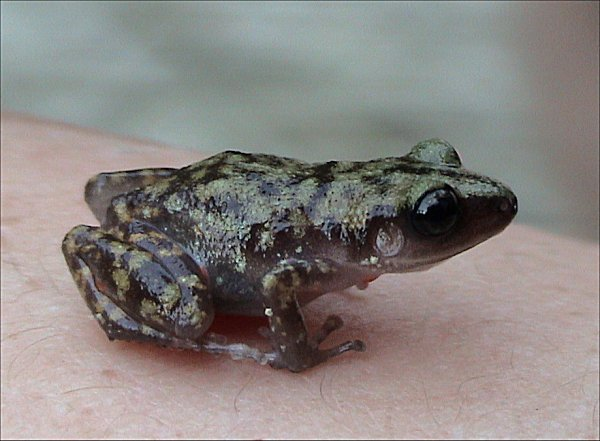
Cliff chirping frog (E. marnockii)

Eleutherodactylus is a genus of frogs in the family Eleutherodactylidae. Many of the 200 species of the genus are commonly known as "rain frogs" or "robber frogs", due to their sharp, high-pitched, insect-like calls. They are found from the southern United States south to Central America, and reach their greatest diversity in the Caribbean.

Species endemic to Puerto Rico are often referred to as coquís, of which the best-known species is the common coquí (E. coqui), which is both a national symbol of Puerto Rico and a notorious invasive species in Hawaii. Two Eleutherodactylus species, E. limbatus and E. iberia, are among the smallest known frogs, measuring only 8.5 mm in length (only slightly larger than Paedophryne amauensis, which measures around 7.7 mm).

== Etymology ==
The name "Eleutherodactylus" is derived from the Greek words for 'free-toed', composed of the Ancient Greek eleutheros (ἐλεύθερος, 'free, unbound') and dactylos (δάκτυλος, 'finger, toe'). Most species are small, slender, and cryptically colored, with three to five free toes. A few, such as the web-footed coquí (E. karlschmidti) of Puerto Rico, do have completely webbed feet.

== Distribution and habitat ==
Species of Eleutherodactylus are found throughout the Neotropics, including the southern United States, Mexico, Central America, and the Caribbean. Additionally, the common coquí (E. coqui) has been introduced to several islands in the Hawaiian archipelago, as well as elsewhere in the Pacific.

They can be terrestrial, arboreal, or aquatic, typically living in forests or riparian areas, and feeding primarily upon arthropods. Many Eleutherodactylus species have highly restricted ranges and are found on only one island or in one or a few localities. Even some of these restricted species can occur at very high densities.

Some species of Eleutherodactylus are well adapted to urban environments and are actually notorious for being up to five times more common in developed areas than in the wild.

== Reproduction and development ==
All species of Eleutherodactylus are characterized by direct development, in which eggs hatch directly into small frogs, completely bypassing the tadpole stage. This adaptation (shared by few other frog genera, e.g. Myobatrachus) may be largely responsible for their ecological and evolutionary success. Most species are characterized by parental behaviors, such as egg-guarding by either the male or female parent. In some cases, even young froglets are attended by parents. Another extinct Puerto Rican species, the golden coquí (E. jasperi), gave birth to live young. Many species (for example, Cook's robber frog, E. cooki), also of Puerto Rico, exhibit sexual dimorphism in size and color.

Study on Eleutherodactylus and Lithobates amphibians shows that number of offsprings instead of body size may help to find which species require conservation from being extinct.

== Taxonomy ==
=== Fossil record ===
The oldest fossil of Eleutherodactylus is a partial humerus from the Early Oligocene-aged San Sebastián Limestone of Puerto Rico, likely not long after the genus first dispersed to the Caribbean from South America. Late Oligocene-aged Eleutherodactylus fossils are also known from sinkhole deposits in the Suwanee Limestone of Florida, USA, indicating that Eleutherodactylus were formerly native to Florida (only present today as introduced species), and had likely dispersed out of the Caribbean to the North American mainland early on in their evolution. They appear to have been one of the dominant frog taxa in the region at the time, with over 174 individual remains known from these deposits. Preserved frog remains referred to Eleutherodactylus have been reported from Miocene aged Dominican amber.

=== Phylogenetics ===
The basis of forming this genus has been morphological, but sequence comparisons of protein-encoding DNA, mitochondrial DNA, and ribosomal RNA have shown geographic range is a much more consistent predictor of cladistics for this group of frogs. The climbing habits of many species have evolved independently. All true members of the genus have been clustered into subgenera, but many less-related species require more genetic data before they are to be officially classified elsewhere. The theory that the eleutherodactyline colonization of Central America and the Caribbean from their origins in South America occurred during the Cretaceous has fallen out of favor. The fossil record, combined with molecular clock analyses, indicate the subgenera were probably founded by small groups of individuals by flotsam dispersal from South America during the Eocene or Oligocene epochs. Land bridges would have been limited to facilitating dispersal between West Indian islands, however, the Oligocene division of Hispaniola and Cuba resulted in further speciation. The distribution of the subgenus Syrrhopus is most likely due to a secondary dispersal to Central America from the Greater Antilles during the Miocene. The formation of the Panama Isthmus during the Pliocene has caused some intercontinental distribution among the clades, although only 20 "South American frogs" have ever made it northwards after the original colonization. Sensu stricto, however, it should exclude clades with distributions south of the Panama Canal.

=== Species ===
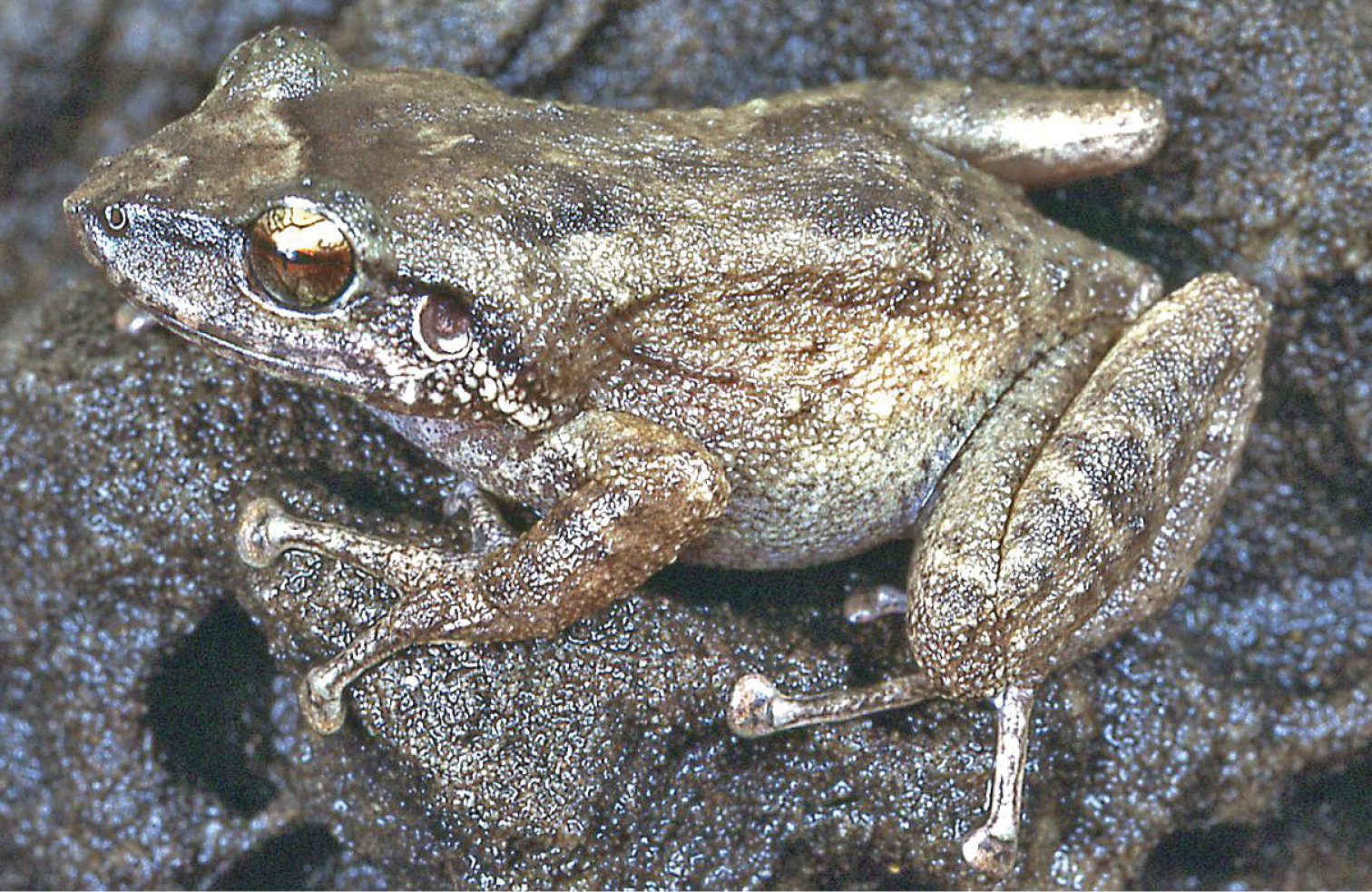
The common coquí (E. coqui) is likely the most well-known member of the genus.

The following species are recognised in the genus Eleutherodactylus:

- Eleutherodactylus aporostegus Schwartz, 1965
- Eleutherodactylus bothroboans Schwartz, 1965
- Eleutherodactylus campi (Stejneger, 1915)
- Eleutherodactylus counouspeus Schwartz, 1964
- Eleutherodactylus diplasius Schwartz, 1973
- Eleutherodactylus erythroproctus Schwartz, 1960
- Eleutherodactylus feichtingeri Díaz, Hedges, and Schmid, 2012
- Eleutherodactylus limbensis Lynn, 1958
- Eleutherodactylus melatrigonum Schwartz, 1966
- Eleutherodactylus notidodes Schwartz, 1966
- Eleutherodactylus olibrus Schwartz, 1958
- Eleutherodactylus orarius (Dixon, 1957)
- Eleutherodactylus paralius Schwartz, 1976
- Eleutherodactylus rucillensis Cochran, 1939
- Eleutherodactylus sommeri Schwartz, 1977
- Eleutherodactylus staurometopon Schwartz, 1960
- Eleutherodactylus tychathrous Schwartz, 1965

==== West Indian (subgenus Eleutherodactylus) ====
- E. (E.) abbotti Cochran, 1923
- E. (E.) amplinympha Kaiser, Green & Schmid, 1994
- E. (E.) antillensis Reinhardt & Lütken, 1863
- E. (E.) audanti Cochran, 1934
- E. (E.) auriculatoides Noble, 1923
- E. (E.) auriculatus Cope, 1862
- E. (E.) barlagnei Lynch, 1965
- E. (E.) bartonsmithi Schwartz, 1960
- E. (E.) brittoni Schmidt, 1920
- E. (E.) cochranae Grant, 1932
- E. (E.) cooki Grant, 1932
- E. (E.) coqui Thomas, 1966
- E. (E.) eileenae Dunn, 1926
- E. (E.) eneidae Rivero, 1959
- E. (E.) flavescens Noble, 1923
- E. (E.) fowleri Schwartz, 1973
- E. (E.) glamyrus Estrada & Hedges, 1997
- E. (E.) gryllus Schmidt, 1920
- E. (E.) guantanamera Hedges, Estrada & Thomas, 1992
- E. (E.) haitianus Barbour, 1942
- E. (E.) hedricki Rivero, 1963
- E. (E.) ionthus Schwartz, 1960
- E. (E.) jasperi Drewry & Jones, 1976
- E. (E.) johnstonei Barbour, 1914
- E. (E.) juanariveroi Ríos-López & Thomas, 2007
- E. (E.) karlschmidti Grant, 1931
- E. (E.) lamprotes Schwartz, 1973
- E. (E.) leberi Schwartz, 1965
- E. (E.) locustus Schmidt, 1920
- E. (E.) mariposa Hedges, Estrada & Thomas, 1992
- E. (E.) martinicensis Tschudi, 1838
- E. (E.) melacara Hedges, Estrada & Thomas, 1992
- E. (E.) minutus Noble, 1923
- E. (E.) montanus Schmidt, 1919
- E. (E.) parabates Schwartz, 1964
- E. (E.) patriciae Schwartz, 1965
- E. (E.) pinchoni Schwartz, 1967
- E. (E.) pituinus Schwartz, 1965
- E. (E.) poolei Cochran, 1938
- E. (E.) portoricensis Schmidt, 1927
- E. (E.) principalis Estrada & Hedges, 1997
- E. (E.) richmondi Stejneger, 1904
- E. (E.) ronaldi Schwartz, 1960
- E. (E.) schwartzi Thomas, 1966
- E. (E.) unicolor Stejneger, 1904
- E. (E.) varians Gundlach & Peters, 1864
- E. (E.) wetmorei Cochran, 1932
- E. (E.) wightmanae Schmidt, 1920

==== West Indian (subgenus Euhyas) ====
- E. (Eu.) acmonis Schwartz, 1960
- E. (Eu.) adelus Diaz, Cadiz & Hedges, 2003
- E. (Eu.) albipes Barbour & Shreve, 1937
- E. (Eu.) alcoae Schwartz, 1971
- E. (Eu.) alticola Lynn, 1937
- E. (Eu.) amadeus Hedges, Thomas & Franz, 1987
- E. (Eu.) andrewsi Lynn, 1937
- E. (Eu.) apostates Schwartz, 1973
- E. (Eu.) armstrongi Noble & Hassler, 1933
- E. (Eu.) atknisi Dunn, 1925
- E. (Eu.) bakeri Cochran, 1935
- E. (Eu.) beguei Díaz and Hedges, 2015
- E. (Eu.) blairhedgesi Estrada, Díaz & Rodriguez, 1998
- E. (Eu.) bresslerae Schwartz, 1960
- E. (Eu.) brevirostris Shreve, 1936
- E. (Eu.) caribe Hedges & Thomas, 1992
- E. (Eu.) casparii Dunn, 1926
- E. (Eu.) cavernicola Lynn, 1954
- E. (Eu.) corona Hedges & Thomas, 1992
- E. (Eu.) cubanus Barbour, 1942
- E. (Eu.) cundalli Dunn, 1926
- E. (Eu.) cuneatus Cope, 1862
- E. (Eu.) darlingtoni Cochran, 1935
- E. (Eu.) dimidiatus Cope, 1862
- E. (Eu.) dolomedes Hedges & Thomas, 1992
- E. (Eu.) emiliae Dunn, 1926
- E. (Eu.) etheridgei Schwartz, 1958
- E. (Eu.) eunaster Schwartz, 1973
- E. (Eu.) furcyensis Shreve & Williams, 1963
- E. (Eu.) fuscus Lynn & Dent, 1943
- E. (Eu.) glandulifer Cochran, 1935
- E. (Eu.) glanduliferoides Shreve, 1936
- E. (Eu.) glaphycompus Schwartz, 1973
- E. (Eu.) glaucoreius Schwartz & Fowler, 1973
- E. (Eu.) goini Schwartz, 1960
- E. (Eu.) gossei Dunn, 1926
- E. (Eu.) grabhami Dunn, 1926
- E. (Eu.) grahami Schwartz, 1979
- E. (Eu.) greyi Dunn, 1926
- E. (Eu.) griphus Crombie, 1986
- E. (Eu.) guanahacabibes Estrada & Rodriguez, 1985
- E. (Eu.) gundlachi Schmidt, 1920
- E. (Eu.) heminota Shreve & Williams, 1963
- E. (Eu.) iberia Estrada & Hedges, 1996
- E. (Eu.) intermedius Barbour & Shreve, 1937
- E. (Eu.) jamaicensis Barbour, 1910
- E. (Eu.) jaumei Estrada & Alonso, 1997
- E. (Eu.) jugans Cochran, 1937
- E. (Eu.) junori Dunn, 1926
- E. (Eu.) klinikowskii Schwartz, 1959
- E. (Eu.) lentus Cope, 1862
- E. (Eu.) leoncei Shreve & Williams, 1963
- E. (Eu.) limbatus Cope, 1862
- E. (Eu.) lucioi Schwartz, 1980
- E. (Eu.) luteolus Gosse, 1851
- E. (Eu.) maestrensis Díaz, Cádiz & Navarro, 2005
- E. (Eu.) michaelschmidi Díaz, Cádiz & Navarro, 2007
- E. (Eu.) monensis Meerwarth, 1901
- E. (Eu.) nubicola Dunn, 1926
- E. (Eu.) orcutti Dunn, 1928
- E. (Eu.) orientalis Barbour & Shreve, 1937
- E. (Eu.) oxyrhyncus Duméril & Bibron, 1841
- E. (Eu.) pantoni Dunn, 1926
- E. (Eu.) paulsoni Schwartz, 1964
- E. (Eu.) pentasyringos Schwartz & Fowler, 1973
- E. (Eu.) pezopetrus Schwartz, 1960
- E. (Eu.) pictissimus Cochran, 1935
- E. (Eu.) pinarensis Dunn, 1926
- E. (Eu.) planirostris Cope, 1862
- E. (Eu.) probolaeus Schwartz, 1965
- E. (Eu.) rhodesi Schwartz, 1980
- E. (Eu.) ricordii Duméril & Bibron, 1841
- E. (Eu.) riparius Estrada & Hedges, 1998
- E. (Eu.) rivularis Diaz, Estrada & Hedges, 2001
- E. (Eu.) rogersi Goin, 1955
- E. (Eu.) rufifemroralis Noble & Hassler, 1933
- E. (Eu.) schmidti Noble, 1923
- E. (Eu.) sciagraphus Schwartz, 1973
- E. (Eu.) semipalmatus Shreve, 1936
- E. (Eu.) simulans Diaz & Fong, 2001
- E. (Eu.) sisyphodemus Crombie, 1977
- E. (Eu.) tetajulia Estrada & Hedges, 1996
- E. (Eu.) thomasi Schwartz, 1959
- E. (Eu.) thorectes Hedges, 1988
- E. (Eu.) toa Estrada & Hedges, 1991
- E. (Eu.) tonyi Estrada & Hedges, 1997
- E. (Eu.) turquinensis Barbour & Shreve, 1937
- E. (Eu.) varleyi Dunn, 1925
- E. (Eu.) ventrilineatus Shreve, 1936
- E. (Eu.) warreni Schwartz, 1976
- E. (Eu.) weinlandi Barbour, 1914
- E. (Eu.) zugi Schwartz, 1958

==== Hispaniolan (subgenus Pelorius) ====
- E. (P.) cattus Rodriguez, Dugo-Cota, Montero-Mendieta, Gonzalez-Voyer, Alonso Bosch, Vences, and Vilà, 2017
- E. (P.) chlorophenax Schwartz, 1976
- E. (P.) geitonos Díaz, Incháustegui, Marte, Köhler, Cádiz, and Rodríguez, 2018
- E. (P.) hypostenor Schwartz, 1965
- E. (P.) inoptatus Barbour, 1914
- E. (P.) ligiae Incháustegui, Díaz, and Marte, 2015
- E. (P.) neiba Incháustegui, Díaz, and Marte, 2015
- E. (P.) nortoni Schwartz, 1976
- E. (P.) parapelates Hedges & Thomas, 1987
- E. (P.) ruthae Noble, 1923

==== North/Central American and Cuban (subgenus Syrrhophus) ====
- E. (S.) albolabris Lynch & Lescure, 1980
- E. (S.) angustidigitorum Taylor, 1940
- Eleutherodactylus colimotl Grünwald, Reyes-Velasco, Franz-Chávez, Morales-Flores, Ahumada-Carrillo, Jones, and Boissinot, 2018
- E. (S.) cystingnathoides Cope, 1877
- E. (S.) dennisi Lynch, 1970
- E. (S.) dilatus Davis & Dixon, 1955
- E. (S.) erendirae Grünwald, Reyes-Velasco, Franz-Chávez, Morales-Flores, Ahumada-Carrillo, Jones, and Boissinot, 2018
- E. (S.) floresvillelai Grünwald, Reyes-Velasco, Franz-Chávez, Morales-Flores, Ahumada-Carrillo, Jones, and Boissinot, 2018
- E. (S.) grandis Dixon, 1957
- E. (S.) grunwaldi Reyes-Velasco, Ahumada-Carrillo, Burkhardt, and Devitt, 2015
- E. (S.) guttilatus Cope, 1879
- E. (S.) humboldti Devitt, Tseng, Taylor-Adair, Koganti, Timugura, and Cannatella, 2023
- E. (S.) interorbitalis Langebartel & Shannon, 1956
- E. (S.) jaliscoensis Grünwald, Reyes-Velasco, Franz-Chávez, Morales-Flores, Ahumada-Carrillo, Jones, and Boissinot, 2018
- E. (S.) jamesdixoni Devitt, Tseng, Taylor-Adair, Koganti, Timugura, and Cannatella, 2023
- E. (S.) leprus Cope, 1879
- E. (S.) longipes Baird, 1859
- E. (S.) manantlanensis Grünwald, Reyes-Velasco, Franz-Chávez, Morales-Flores, Ahumada-Carrillo, Jones, and Boissinot, 2018
- E. (S.) marnockii Cope, 1878
- E. (S.) maurus Hedges, 1989
- E. (S.) modestus Taylor, 1942
- E. (S.) nietoi Grünwald, Reyes-Velasco, Franz-Chávez, Morales-Flores, Ahumada-Carrillo, Jones, and Boissinot, 2018
- E. (S.) nitidus Peters, 1870
- E. (S.) pallidus Duellman, 1958
- E. (S.) pipilans Taylor, 1940
- E. (S.) rubrimaculatus Taylor & Smith, 1945
- E. (S.) rufescens (Duellman & Dixon, 1959)
- E. (S.) saxatilis Webb, 1962
- E. (S.) symingtoni Schwartz, 1957
- E. (S.) syristes Hoyt, 1965
- E. (S.) teretistes Duellman, 1958
- E. (S.) verrucipes Cope, 1885
- E. (S.) verruculatus Peters, 1870
- E. (S.) wixarika Reyes-Velasco, Ahumada-Carrillo, Burkhardt, and Devitt, 2015
- E. (S.) zeus Schwartz, 1958
