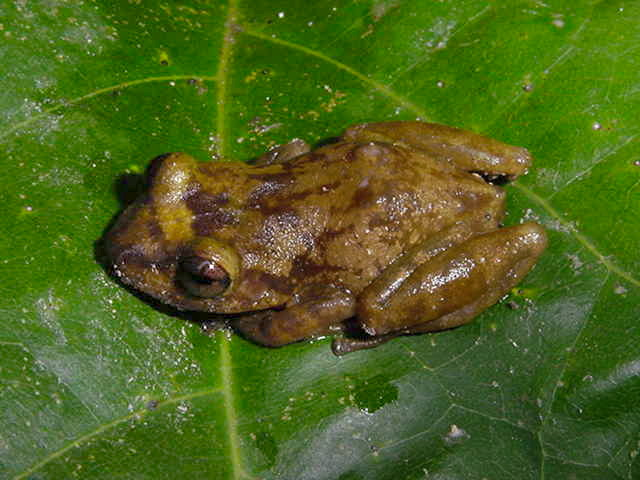

Conservation status
- Endangered (IUCN 3.1)

Scientific classification
- Kingdom: Animalia
- Phylum: Chordata
- Class: Amphibia
- Order: Anura
- Clade: Brachycephaloidea
- Family: Eleutherodactylidae
- Genus: Eleutherodactylus
- Species: E. ionthus

Binomial name
- Eleutherodactylus ionthus Schwartz, 1960

Synonyms
- Eleutherodactylus varians ssp. ionthus Schwartz, 1960

= Eleutherodactylus ionthus =

Species of amphibian

Eleutherodactylus ionthus is a species of frog in the family Eleutherodactylidae endemic to Cuba. Its natural habitats are subtropical or tropical moist lowland forest and subtropical or tropical moist montane forest. It is threatened by habitat loss.
