= Eleutherodactylus griphus =

Conservation status
- Endangered (IUCN 3.1)

Scientific classification
- Kingdom: Animalia
- Phylum: Chordata
- Class: Amphibia
- Order: Anura
- Family: Eleutherodactylidae
- Genus: Eleutherodactylus
- Species: E. griphus

Binomial name
- Eleutherodactylus griphus Crombie, 1986

Species of frog

Eleutherodactylus griphus is a species of frog in the family Eleutherodactylidae endemic to Jamaica. Its natural habitat is subtropical or tropical moist lowland forest. It is threatened by habitat loss.
