= Eleutherodactylus guttilatus =

Conservation status
- Least Concern (IUCN 3.1)

Scientific classification
- Kingdom: Animalia
- Phylum: Chordata
- Class: Amphibia
- Order: Anura
- Clade: Brachycephaloidea
- Family: Eleutherodactylidae
- Genus: Eleutherodactylus
- Subgenus: Syrrhophus
- Species: E. guttilatus

Binomial name
- Eleutherodactylus guttilatus (Cope, 1879)

Synonyms
- Malachylodes guttilatus Cope, 1879; Syrrhopus guttulatus (Cope, 1879); Eleutherodactylus smithi (Taylor, 1940); Eleutherodactylus petrophilus (Firschein, 1954)

Species of amphibian

The spotted chirping frog or Mexican cliff frog (Eleutherodactylus guttilatus) is a species of small Eleutherodactylid frog native to the southern United States and Mexico. They are found in moderate elevation ranges of the Sierra Madre Oriental mountain range, from the Davis Mountains in west Texas south to the Mexican states of Coahuila, Nuevo León, San Luis Potosí, Durango and Guanajuato. They grow from 0.75 to 1.25 inches in length, and are easily mistaken for other Eleutherodactylus species, with which they share range. This has led to some confusion in its taxonomic classification.
