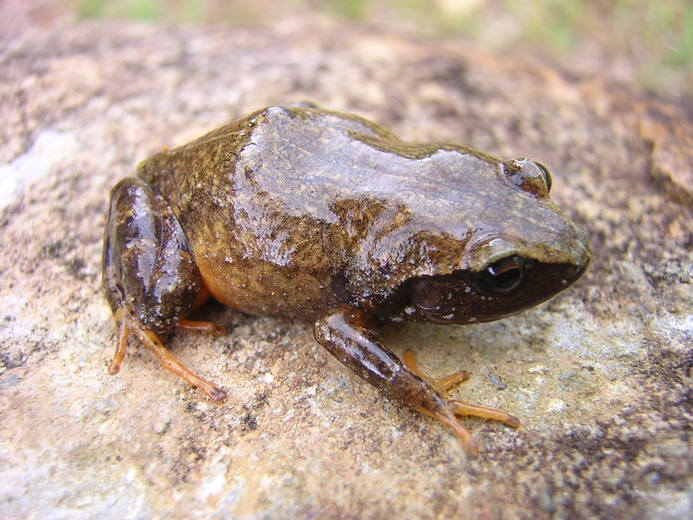

Conservation status
- Critically Endangered (IUCN 3.1)

Scientific classification
- Kingdom: Animalia
- Phylum: Chordata
- Class: Amphibia
- Order: Anura
- Family: Eleutherodactylidae
- Genus: Eleutherodactylus
- Species: E. albipes

Binomial name
- Eleutherodactylus albipes Barbour & Shreve, 1937

= Eleutherodactylus albipes =

Species of amphibian

Eleutherodactylus albipes is a species of frog in the family Eleutherodactylidae endemic to Cuba. Its natural habitat is subtropical or tropical moist montane forest. It is threatened by habitat loss.
