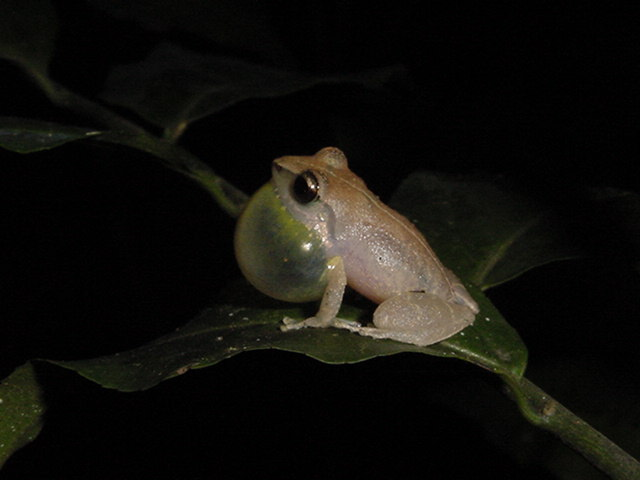

Conservation status
- Least Concern (IUCN 3.1)

Scientific classification
- Kingdom: Animalia
- Phylum: Chordata
- Class: Amphibia
- Order: Anura
- Family: Eleutherodactylidae
- Genus: Eleutherodactylus
- Species: E. auriculatus

Binomial name
- Eleutherodactylus auriculatus (Cope, 1862)

Synonyms
- Hylodes auriculatus Cope, 1862

= Eleutherodactylus auriculatus =

Species of amphibian

Eleutherodactylus auriculatus is a species of frog in the family Eleutherodactylidae endemic to Cuba. It is a widespread species that also occurs on the Isla de Juventud. It is found from sea level to 1,300 m (4,300 ft) asl.

Eleutherodactylus auriculatus is a very common, arboreal species. Its natural habitats are mesic primary and secondary forests. It can also occur in coffee plantations with tall trees grown for shade. The eggs are laid in bromeliads or on the ground. It is threatened by habitat loss caused by clear-cutting, agriculture, and infrastructure development.
