= Eleutherodactylus klinikowskii =

Conservation status
- Endangered (IUCN 3.1)

Scientific classification
- Kingdom: Animalia
- Phylum: Chordata
- Class: Amphibia
- Order: Anura
- Clade: Brachycephaloidea
- Family: Eleutherodactylidae
- Genus: Eleutherodactylus
- Species: E. klinikowskii

Binomial name
- Eleutherodactylus klinikowskii Schwartz, 1959

Species of amphibian

Eleutherodactylus klinikowskii is a species of frog in the family Eleutherodactylidae endemic to Cuba. Its natural habitats are tropical moist lowland forest and rocky areas.
