= Eleutherodactylus cundalli =

Conservation status
- Vulnerable (IUCN 3.1)

Scientific classification
- Kingdom: Animalia
- Phylum: Chordata
- Class: Amphibia
- Order: Anura
- Clade: Brachycephaloidea
- Family: Eleutherodactylidae
- Genus: Eleutherodactylus
- Species: E. cundalli

Binomial name
- Eleutherodactylus cundalli Dunn, 1926

Species of frog

Eleutherodactylus cundalli is a species of frog in the family Eleutherodactylidae endemic to Jamaica. Its natural habitats are subtropical or tropical moist lowland forest, rocky areas, and caves. It is threatened by habitat loss.
