= Eleutherodactylus nitidus =

Conservation status
- Least Concern (IUCN 3.1)

Scientific classification
- Kingdom: Animalia
- Phylum: Chordata
- Class: Amphibia
- Order: Anura
- Family: Eleutherodactylidae
- Genus: Eleutherodactylus
- Species: E. nitidus

Binomial name
- Eleutherodactylus nitidus (Peters, 1869)

Synonyms
- Tomodactylus amulae Günther, 1900; Tomodactylus nitidus Dixon, 1957

Species of frog

Eleutherodactylus nitidus is a species of frog in the family Eleutherodactylidae. It is endemic to Mexico. Its natural habitat is subtropical or tropical dry forest. It is threatened by habitat loss.
