= Samuelssonia =

Conservation status
- Critically Endangered (IUCN 3.1)

Scientific classification
- Kingdom: Plantae
- Clade: Tracheophytes
- Clade: Angiosperms
- Clade: Eudicots
- Clade: Asterids
- Order: Lamiales
- Family: Acanthaceae
- Genus: Samuelssonia; Urb. & Ekman (1929)
- Species: S. verrucosa

Binomial name
- Samuelssonia verrucosa Urb. & Ekman (1929)

Genus of plants

Samuelssonia is a monotypic genus of flowering plants belonging to the family Acanthaceae. It has only one known species, Samuelssonia verrucosa, a small tree which grows to 5 meters tall which is native to the Massif de la Hotte in Haiti.

== Range and habitat ==
Samuelssonia verrucosa grows in lower montane rain forest at approximately 1,150 m (3,770 ft) elevation, with an average annual rainfall of 2,000–2,400 mm (79–94 in). It grows mostly in broadleaved forest on limestone, typically karst limestone. Associated plants include trees of the genera Ocotea, Persea, Sideroxylon, Ficus, and Tabebuia, shrubs of Psidium, Eugenia, Guettarda, Rondeletia, Capparis, Hamelia, Psychotria, Palicourea, Conostegia, Wercklea, Mikania, Calyptranthes, ferns of Elaphoglossum, Dryopteris, and Asplenium, herbs of Ponthieva, Peperomia, Lepidaploa, Urera, Pilea, Elephantopus, and Salvia, epiphytes of Tillandsia and Bromelia, and vines of Hyperbaena, Passiflora, Manettia, and Arthrostylidium. These forests include many other species endemic to the massif, Haiti, and Hispaniola.

== Conservation ==
Most of the species' current habitat is degraded or secondary forest, the result of deforestation. Deforestation of the massif and proliferation of invasive species are ongoing, resulting in loss of habitat, decline of habitat quality, and fragmentation of populations. The species' population is estimated at fewer than 50 mature individuals, and it is assessed as Critically Endangered.

== Classification ==
The genus and the species were both circumscribed by Ignaz Urban and Eric Leonard Ekman in Arkiv Bot. vol.22A (8) on pages 96–97 in 1929.

The genus name of Samuelssonia is in honour of Gunnar Samuelsson (1885–1944), who was a Swedish botanist, from the Uppsala University where he was a curator of the Botanical Museum. Between 1924-1944, he was Professor and Director of the Riksmuseum in Stockholm.
