= Sarcinula =

Sarcinula may refer to:

- Sarcinula, an extinct genus of marine invertebrates in the class Anthozoa
- Sarcinula, a synonym for a genus of orchids, Specklinia
