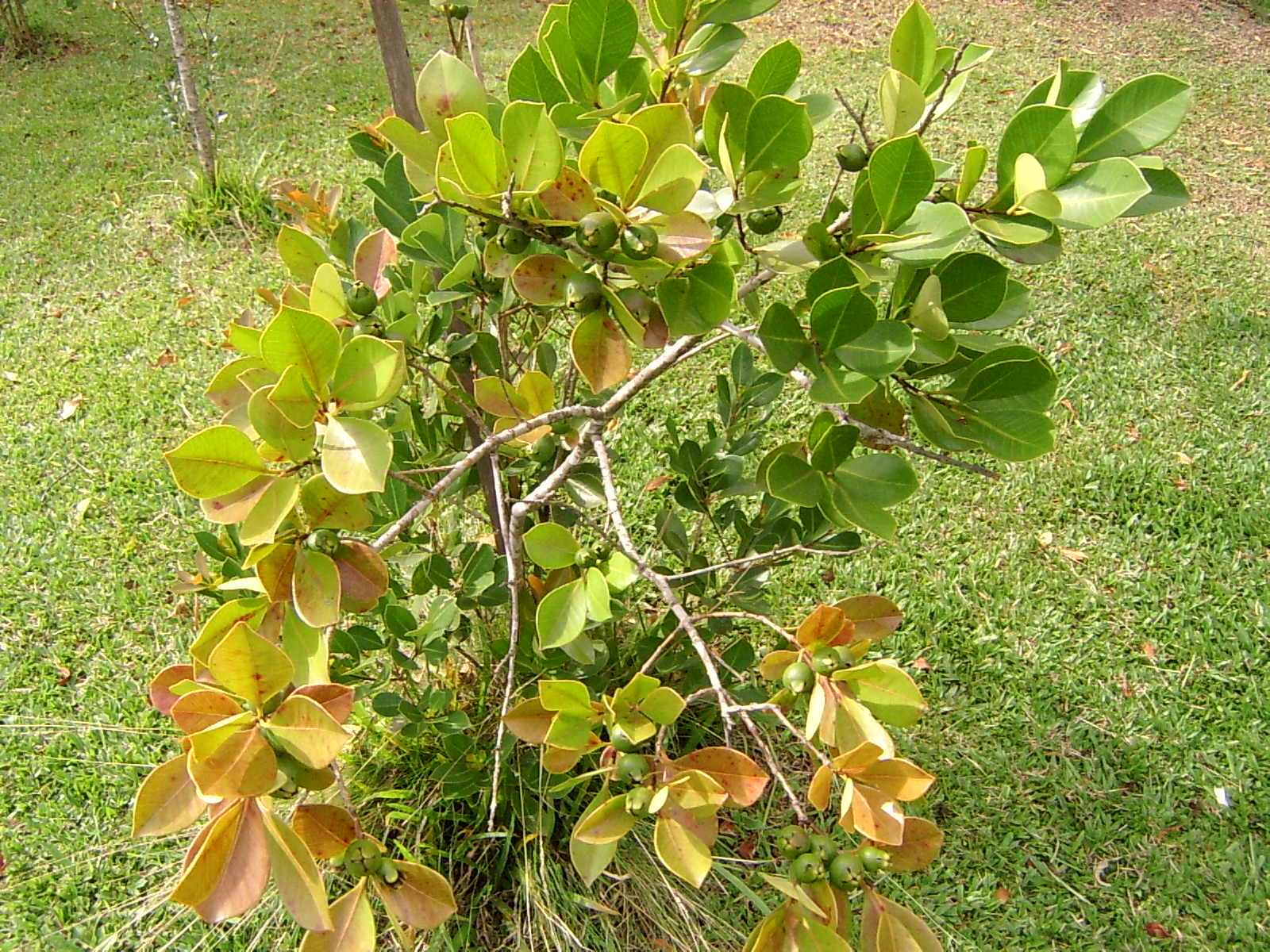
- M. guineensis

Scientific classification
- Kingdom: Plantae
- Clade: Tracheophytes
- Clade: Angiosperms
- Clade: Eudicots
- Clade: Rosids
- Order: Myrtales
- Family: Myrtaceae
- Subfamily: Myrtoideae
- Tribe: Myrteae
- Genus: Mosiera; Small

Type species
- Mosiera longipes (O.Berg) Small

= Mosiera =

Genus of flowering plants in the myrtle family

Mosiera is a genus of shrubs and small trees in the family Myrtaceae, first described as a genus in 1933. It is native to Mexico, Guatemala, the West Indies, Brazil, and Florida.

The genus was named in honor of Charles A. Mosier

Accepted species

1. Mosiera acunae – Cuba
2. Mosiera androsiana – Andros I
3. Mosiera araneosa – Cuba
4. Mosiera baracoensis – Cuba
5. Mosiera bissei – Cuba
6. Mosiera bullata – Cuba
7. Mosiera cabanasensis – Cuba
8. Mosiera calycolpoides – Cuba
9. Mosiera contrerasii – Petén, Quintana Roo
10. Mosiera crenulata – Cuba
11. Mosiera cuspidata – Dominican Republic
12. Mosiera del-riscoi – Cuba
13. Mosiera ehrenbergii – Tamaulipas, Hidalgo, San Luis Potosí
14. Mosiera ekmanii – Sierra de Nipe in Cuba
15. Mosiera elliptica – Cuba
16. Mosiera gracilipes – Dominican Republic
17. Mosiera havanensis – Cuba
18. Mosiera jackii – Cuba
19. Mosiera longipes – Bahamas, Haiti, Puerto Rico, Turks & Caicos, Netherlands Antilles, Florida
20. Mosiera macrophylla – Cuba
21. Mosiera × miraflorensis – Cuba
22. Mosiera moaensis – Sierra de Moa in Cuba
23. Mosiera munizii – Cuba
24. Mosiera nummularioides – Cuba
25. Mosiera occidentalis – Cuba
26. Mosiera oonophylla – Cuba
27. Mosiera ophiticola – Sierra de Moa in Cuba
28. Mosiera tiburona – Massif de la Hotte
29. Mosiera tussacii – Haiti
30. Mosiera urbaniana – Dominican Republic
31. Mosiera wrightii – Cuba
32. Mosiera xerophytica – Puerto Rico, St. John
