= Miconia revolutifolia =

Conservation status
- Endangered (IUCN 3.1)

Scientific classification
- Kingdom: Plantae
- Clade: Tracheophytes
- Clade: Angiosperms
- Clade: Eudicots
- Clade: Rosids
- Order: Myrtales
- Family: Melastomataceae
- Genus: Miconia
- Species: M. revolutifolia

Binomial name
- Miconia revolutifolia Skean, Judd & Majure (2018)

Synonyms
- Mecranium revolutum Skean & Judd (1986)

Species of tree

Miconia revolutifolia is a rare tree from Haiti, specifically in Sud. It is endemic to the Morne Formon-Pic Macaya region of the Massif de la Hotte mountain range. Along with the other species of Miconia from the area it is called "macrio", or "bwa pijon" in Haitian Creole.

The plant was first described as Mecranium revolutum in 1986 after being collected in the Parc National Pic Macaya in the Massif de la Hotte mountains.

== Description ==
Plant habit is a densely branched evergreen shrub or small tree up to 5 metres (16 ft) tall. It has gray smooth bark and 4-angled (square) young stems. The thick, waxy leaves are opposite and simple, and are clustered at the stem tips. It flowers in May and June, on determinate (cymose) inflorescences that are produced on the bare stems below the clusters of leaves. The 4-merous flowers are small and white with prominent stamens. The berries that follow are initially green, ripening to reddish, and contain numerous seeds.

== Ecology ==
The habitat of M. revolutifolia is moist montane broadleaf forest located on rugged mountainous terrain including deep, narrow gorges with steep sides, domes or slopes. Limestone is evident in this area. The species is most abundant between 950 metres (3,120 ft) to 1,200 metres (3,900 ft) elevation, but is found as high as 1,600 metres (5,200 ft).

== Phylogeny ==
Miconia revolutifolia may be most closely related to Miconia birimosa which is another poorly researched La Hotte endemic which has similar phenotypic traits. The species differ in flower characteristics, however.
