= Nectandra coeloclada =

Conservation status
- Near Threatened (IUCN 3.1)

Scientific classification
- Kingdom: Plantae
- Clade: Tracheophytes
- Clade: Angiosperms
- Clade: Magnoliids
- Order: Laurales
- Family: Lauraceae
- Genus: Nectandra
- Species: N. coeloclada

Binomial name
- Nectandra coeloclada Rohwer

Species of flowering plant

Nectandra coeloclada is a species of flowering plant in the family Lauraceae. It is a tree endemic to Ecuador. Its natural habitats are subtropical or tropical moist lowland forests and subtropical or tropical moist montane forests.
