= Nectandra matogrossensis =

Conservation status
- Data Deficient (IUCN 3.1)

Scientific classification
- Kingdom: Plantae
- Clade: Tracheophytes
- Clade: Angiosperms
- Clade: Magnoliids
- Order: Laurales
- Family: Lauraceae
- Genus: Nectandra
- Species: N. matogrossensis

Binomial name
- Nectandra matogrossensis Coe-Teixeira

Species of flowering plant

Nectandra matogrossensis is a species of flowering plant in the family Lauraceae.

It is endemic to Mato Grosso and Bahia states in the Atlantic Forest ecoregion of eastern Brazil.
