= Pleurothallis atrohiata =

Scientific classification
- Kingdom: Plantae
- Clade: Tracheophytes
- Clade: Angiosperms
- Clade: Monocots
- Order: Asparagales
- Family: Orchidaceae
- Subfamily: Epidendroideae
- Genus: Pleurothallis
- Species: P. atrohiata

Binomial name
- Pleurothallis atrohiata Dod, 1989

Species of plant

Pleurothallis atrohiata is an orchid species, part of the genus Pleurothallis and the family Orchidaceae. It is also known as "The Dark Opening Pleurothallis".

== Distribution ==
Pleurothallis atrohiata is native to Haiti. It is found on Massif de la Hotte at elevations of 800 meters.

== Taxonomy ==
It was described by Donald Dungan Dod in Moscosoa 5: 226, in 1989.

Pleurothallis is a genus of orchids commonly called bonnet orchids. This was a huge genus, which used to contain more than 1,200 species - the second largest in the Orchidaceae after Bulbophyllum.

The genus name is derived from the Greek word pleurothallos, meaning "riblike branches". This refers to the rib-like stems of many species.
