= Nectandra debilis =

Conservation status
- Least Concern (IUCN 3.1)

Scientific classification
- Kingdom: Plantae
- Clade: Embryophytes
- Clade: Tracheophytes
- Clade: Spermatophytes
- Clade: Angiosperms
- Clade: Magnoliids
- Order: Laurales
- Family: Lauraceae
- Genus: Nectandra
- Species: N. debilis

Binomial name
- Nectandra debilis Mez

Species of flowering plant

Nectandra debilis is a species of flowering plant in the family Lauraceae. It is endemic to Espírito Santo state and Rio de Janeiro (state) of Southeastern Brazil and is threatened by habitat loss.
