= Nectandra wurdackii =

Conservation status
- Endangered (IUCN 3.1)

Scientific classification
- Kingdom: Plantae
- Clade: Tracheophytes
- Clade: Angiosperms
- Clade: Magnoliids
- Order: Laurales
- Family: Lauraceae
- Genus: Nectandra
- Species: N. wurdackii

Binomial name
- Nectandra wurdackii C.K.Allen & Barneby ex Rohwer

Species of plant

Nectandra wurdackii is a species of flowering plant in the family Lauraceae. It is a tree native to northern Bolivia and Peru.
