= Nectandra weddellii =

Conservation status
- Data Deficient (IUCN 3.1)

Scientific classification
- Kingdom: Plantae
- Clade: Tracheophytes
- Clade: Angiosperms
- Clade: Magnoliids
- Order: Laurales
- Family: Lauraceae
- Genus: Nectandra
- Species: N. weddellii

Binomial name
- Nectandra weddellii Meisn.

Species of flowering plant

Nectandra weddellii is a species of flowering plant in the family Lauraceae.

== Distribution ==
It is a tree endemic to Rio de Janeiro state in Southeastern Brazil. It has been collected only from within a 250 kilometres (160 mi) radius of Rio de Janeiro city, in the Atlantic Forest ecoregion.

The IUCN Red List assesses the species as data deficient, threatened by habitat loss.
