= Specklinia areldii =

Scientific classification
- Kingdom: Plantae
- Clade: Tracheophytes
- Clade: Angiosperms
- Clade: Monocots
- Order: Asparagales
- Family: Orchidaceae
- Subfamily: Epidendroideae
- Genus: Specklinia
- Species: S. areldii

Binomial name
- Specklinia areldii (Luer) Pridgeon & M.W.Chase

Synonyms
- Pleurothallis areldii Luer

Species of orchid

Specklinia areldii is a species of orchid plant native to Panama.
