= Nectandra micranthera =

Conservation status
- Endangered (IUCN 3.1)

Scientific classification
- Kingdom: Plantae
- Clade: Tracheophytes
- Clade: Angiosperms
- Clade: Magnoliids
- Order: Laurales
- Family: Lauraceae
- Genus: Nectandra
- Species: N. micranthera

Binomial name
- Nectandra micranthera Rohwer

Species of flowering plant

Nectandra micranthera is a species of flowering plant in the family Lauraceae. It is a tree endemic to Bahia state in eastern Brazil. It is threatened by habitat loss.
