= Specklinia acrisepala =

Scientific classification
- Kingdom: Plantae
- Clade: Tracheophytes
- Clade: Angiosperms
- Clade: Monocots
- Order: Asparagales
- Family: Orchidaceae
- Subfamily: Epidendroideae
- Genus: Specklinia
- Species: S. acrisepala

Binomial name
- Specklinia acrisepala (Ames & C.Schweinf.) Pridgeon & M.W.Chase

Synonyms
- Pleurothallis acrisepala Ames & C.Schweinf.

Species of plant

Specklinia acrisepala is a species of orchid plant native to Costa Rica and Panama.
