= Specklinia turrialbae =

Scientific classification
- Kingdom: Plantae
- Clade: Tracheophytes
- Clade: Angiosperms
- Clade: Monocots
- Order: Asparagales
- Family: Orchidaceae
- Subfamily: Epidendroideae
- Genus: Specklinia
- Species: S. turrialbae

Binomial name
- Specklinia turrialbae (Luer) Luer

Synonyms
- Pleurothallis turrialbae Luer

Species of orchid

Specklinia turrialbae is a species of orchid plant native to Costa Rica.
