= Nectandra dasystyla =

Conservation status
- Vulnerable (IUCN 3.1)

Scientific classification
- Kingdom: Plantae
- Clade: Tracheophytes
- Clade: Angiosperms
- Clade: Magnoliids
- Order: Laurales
- Family: Lauraceae
- Genus: Nectandra
- Species: N. dasystyla

Binomial name
- Nectandra dasystyla Rohwer

Species of tree

Nectandra dasystyla is a species of plant in the family Lauraceae.

It is found in moist lowland forests of Bolivia, Peru, and possibly Ecuador.
