= Specklinia stillsonii =

Scientific classification
- Kingdom: Plantae
- Clade: Tracheophytes
- Clade: Angiosperms
- Clade: Monocots
- Order: Asparagales
- Family: Orchidaceae
- Subfamily: Epidendroideae
- Genus: Specklinia
- Species: S. stillsonii

Binomial name
- Specklinia stillsonii (Dod) Pridgeon & M.W.Chase (2001)

Synonyms
- Pleurothallis stillsonii Dod (1984)

Species of plant

Specklinia stillsonii is a species of orchid plant native to Haiti. It is endemic to the Massif de la Hotte in southwestern Haiti.
