= Nectandra caudatoacuminata =

Conservation status
- Critically Endangered (IUCN 3.1)

Scientific classification
- Kingdom: Plantae
- Clade: Tracheophytes
- Clade: Angiosperms
- Clade: Magnoliids
- Order: Laurales
- Family: Lauraceae
- Genus: Nectandra
- Species: N. caudatoacuminata

Binomial name
- Nectandra caudatoacuminata O.C.Schmidt (1929)

Synonyms
- Ocotea caudatoacuminata (O.C.Schmidt) Alain (1982)

Species of flowering plant

Nectandra caudatoacuminata is a species of plant in the family Lauraceae. It is a tree endemic to the Massif de la Hotte in southwestern Haiti.

It is an evergreen tree that grows to 5 meters, and possibly to 10 meters tall.

Nectandra caudatoacuminata is known only from a single location in the upper Roseaux River watershed on the Massif de la Hotte, along the northern boundary of Macaya National Park. It has an estimated area of occupancy (AOO) of 4 km^{2}.

It grows at the edges of Pinus occidentalis stands at 1,500 meters elevation. The montane forests in the area are a mosaic of pine and broadleaf trees, with pine stands on drier rocky ridges and upper slopes, and broadleaf trees on lower slopes and in valleys with more moisture and deeper soils. Associated broadleaf trees include Frodinia tremula, Brunellia comocladiifolia, Dendropanax arboreus, and Dendropanax selleanus. Understory plants include ferns (species of Alsophila, Blechnum, Blotiella, and Dryopteris), and shrubs of Miconia, Henriettea, Piper, and Pilea.

The forests in the area are under threat from timber harvesting for firewood and charcoal production and from expansion of agriculture, and from fires and hurricanes. The species is assessed as Critically Endangered.
