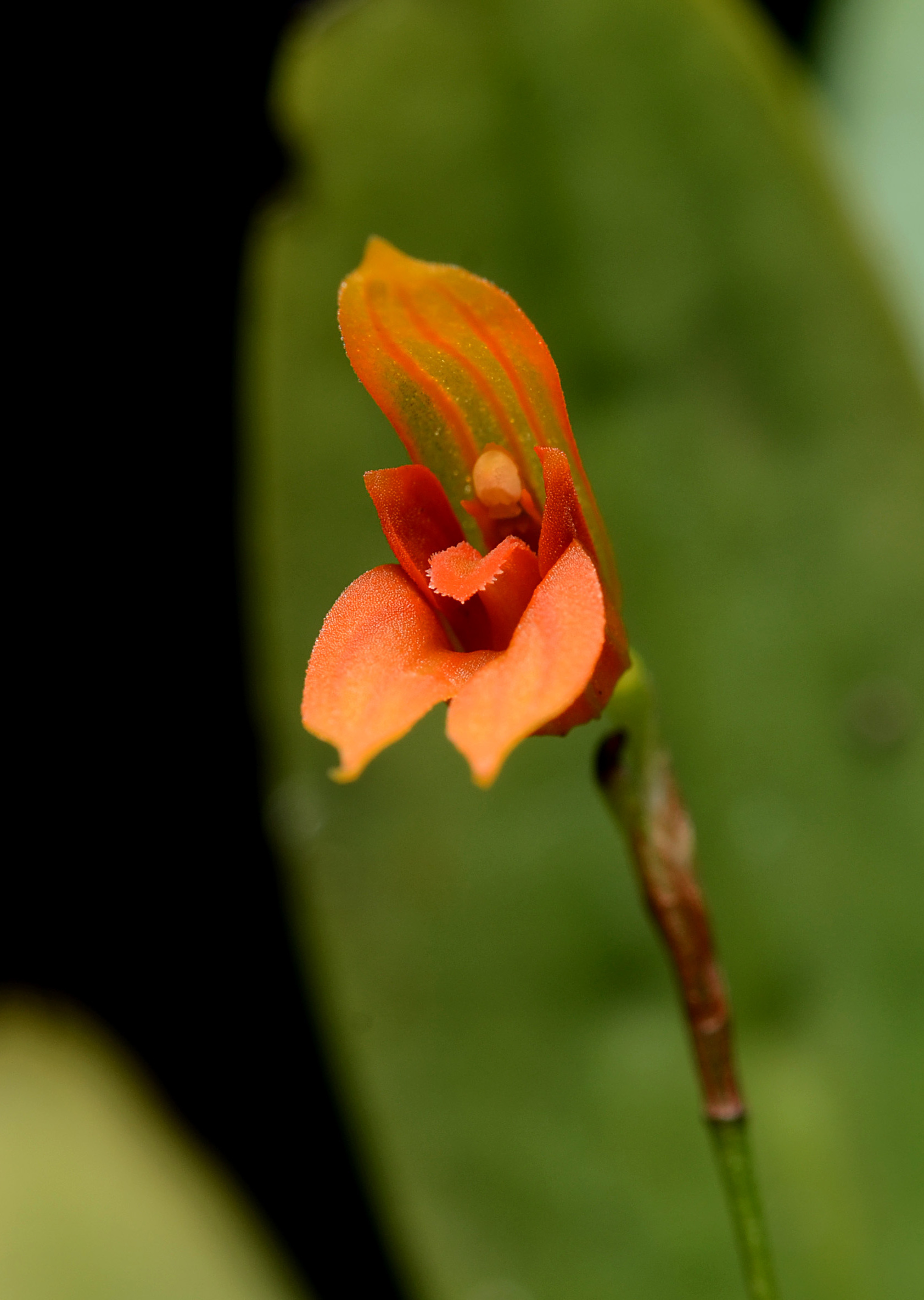

Scientific classification
- Kingdom: Plantae
- Clade: Tracheophytes
- Clade: Angiosperms
- Clade: Monocots
- Order: Asparagales
- Family: Orchidaceae
- Subfamily: Epidendroideae
- Genus: Specklinia
- Species: S. guanacastensis

Binomial name
- Specklinia guanacastensis (Ames & C.Schweinf.) Pridgeon & M.W.Chase

Synonyms
- Pleurothallis guanacastensis Ames & C.Schweinf.

= Specklinia guanacastensis =

Species of plant

Specklinia guanacastensis is a species of orchid plant native to Costa Rica.
