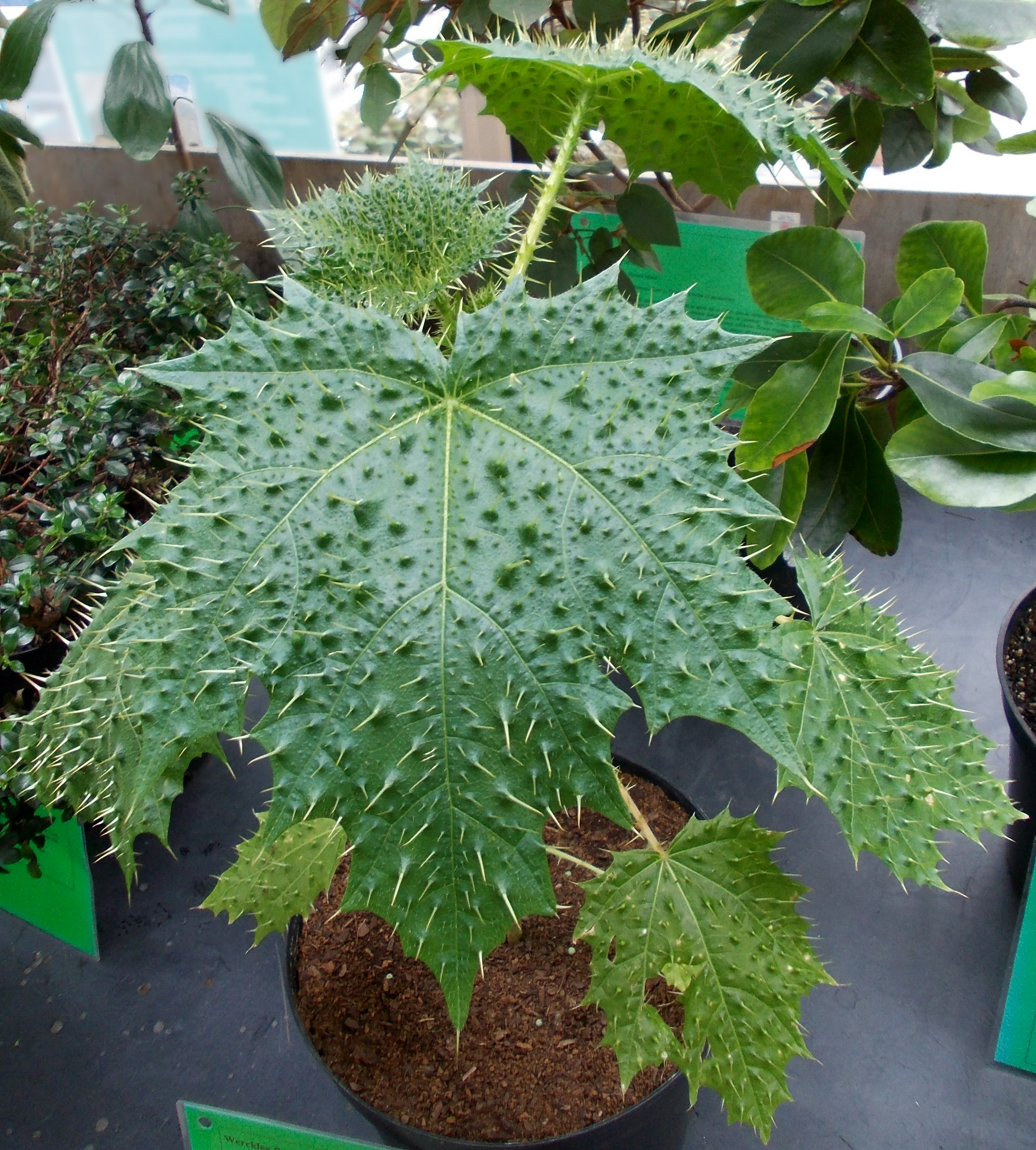

Conservation status
- Critically Endangered (IUCN 2.3)

Scientific classification
- Kingdom: Plantae
- Clade: Tracheophytes
- Clade: Angiosperms
- Clade: Eudicots
- Clade: Rosids
- Order: Malvales
- Family: Malvaceae
- Genus: Wercklea
- Species: W. flavovirens

Binomial name
- Wercklea flavovirens Proctor

= Wercklea flavovirens =

Species of flowering plant

Wercklea flavovirens is a species of plant in the family Malvaceae. It is endemic to Jamaica. It is threatened by habitat loss as forest is cleared to make way for banana plantations. The few individuals surviving in the wild are found mostly on Holland Mountain, with one tree in One Day Cave, Bethel. The area of the former population on Hog House Hill, John Crow Mountains is now a banana plantation.
