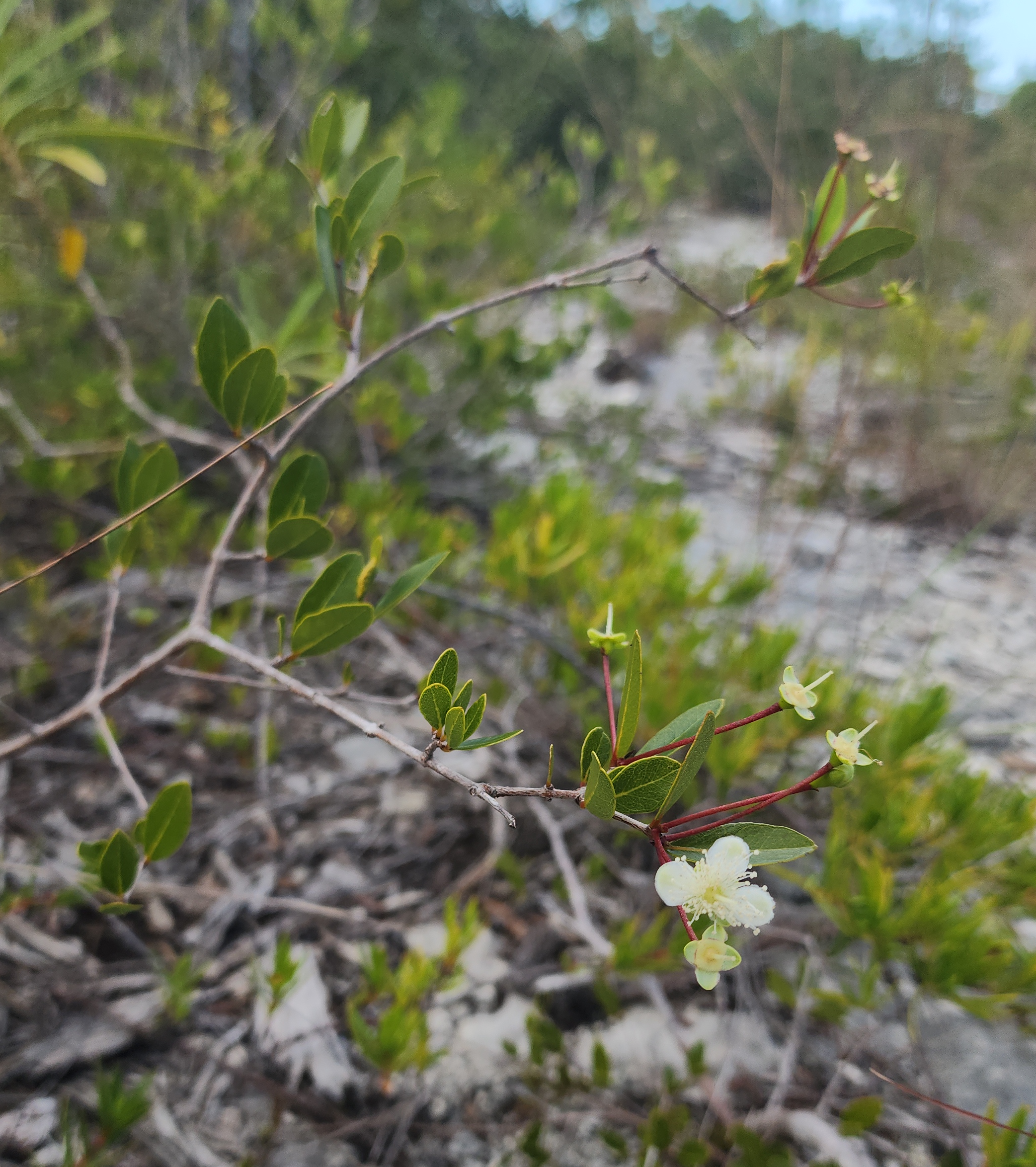

Conservation status
- Near Threatened (IUCN 3.1)

- Vulnerable (NatureServe)

Scientific classification
- Kingdom: Plantae
- Clade: Tracheophytes
- Clade: Angiosperms
- Clade: Eudicots
- Clade: Rosids
- Order: Myrtales
- Family: Myrtaceae
- Genus: Mosiera
- Species: M. longipes

Binomial name
- Mosiera longipes (O.Berg) Small

Synonyms
- Anamomis bahamensis (Kiaersk.) Britton ex Small; Anamomis longipes (O.Berg) Britton ex Small; Eugenia bahamensis Kiaersk.; Eugenia longipes O.Berg; Eugenia orbicularis O.Berg; Mosiera bahamensis (Kiaersk.) Small; Myrtus bahamensis (Kiaersk.) Urb.; Myrtus orbicularis (O.Berg) Burret; Myrtus verrucosa O.Berg; Psidium insulanum Alain; Psidium longipes (O.Berg) McVaugh; Psidium longipes var. orbiculare (O.Berg) McVaugh

= Mosiera longipes =

Species of plant

Mosiera longipes is a species of flowering plant in the family Myrtaceae. Its common names include mangroveberry, Bahama stopper, and long-stalked stopper. It is a tree native to parts of the Caribbean and southern Florida.

The species is listed as Near Threatened on the IUCN Red List and shows a declining population trend.

== Description ==
Mangroveberry is a medium-sized shrub, rarely becoming a small tree. It has wide-spreading branches and very short trunks. The opposite leaves are oval and shiny, the flowers have four white to pink petals and a tuft of prominent stamens, and the round fruit ripens from red to black.

== Range ==
Mangroveberry occurs in the Bahamas, Florida, Haiti, Netherlands Antilles, Puerto Rico, and the Turks and Caicos Islands, but may have been extirpated from Puerto Rico.

== Habitat ==
This species occurs in mostly sunny areas of hammocks and pine rockland. It grows in both sand and hardened limestone along rocky coastlands, but has a low tolerance for salt wind and salt or brackish water flooding.

== Ecology ==
Although nearly ubiquitous in suitable habitat in the Bahamas, mangroveberry globally has fragmented and declining populations. The main threats are residential and commercial development, wildfire suppression, and sea level rise.
