= Specklinia cactantha =

Scientific classification
- Kingdom: Plantae
- Clade: Tracheophytes
- Clade: Angiosperms
- Clade: Monocots
- Order: Asparagales
- Family: Orchidaceae
- Subfamily: Epidendroideae
- Genus: Specklinia
- Species: S. cactantha

Binomial name
- Specklinia cactantha (Luer) Pridgeon & M.W.Chase

Synonyms
- Pleurothallis cactantha Luer; Sylphia cactantha (Luer) Luer

Species of orchid

Specklinia cactantha is a species of orchid native to Panama and Colombia. It was first formally named Pleurothallis cactantha in 1976 and transferred to the genus Specklinia in 2001.
