= Mosiera havanensis =

Conservation status
- Endangered (IUCN 3.1)

Scientific classification
- Kingdom: Plantae
- Clade: Tracheophytes
- Clade: Angiosperms
- Clade: Eudicots
- Clade: Rosids
- Order: Myrtales
- Family: Myrtaceae
- Genus: Mosiera
- Species: M. havanensis

Binomial name
- Mosiera havanensis (Urb.) Bisse

Synonyms
- Psidium havanense Urb.

Species of guava plant

Mosiera havanensis is a species of flowering plant in the family Myrtaceae. It is a shrub or tree endemic to Cuba, where it grows in thorny xeromorphic scrub on serpentine soils. It is threatened by habitat loss.
