= Specklinia barbosana =

Scientific classification
- Kingdom: Plantae
- Clade: Tracheophytes
- Clade: Angiosperms
- Clade: Monocots
- Order: Asparagales
- Family: Orchidaceae
- Subfamily: Epidendroideae
- Genus: Specklinia
- Species: S. barbosana

Binomial name
- Specklinia barbosana (De Wild.) Campacci

Synonyms
- Pleurothallis barbosana De Wild.

Species of orchid

Specklinia barbosana is a species of orchid plant native to Brazil.
