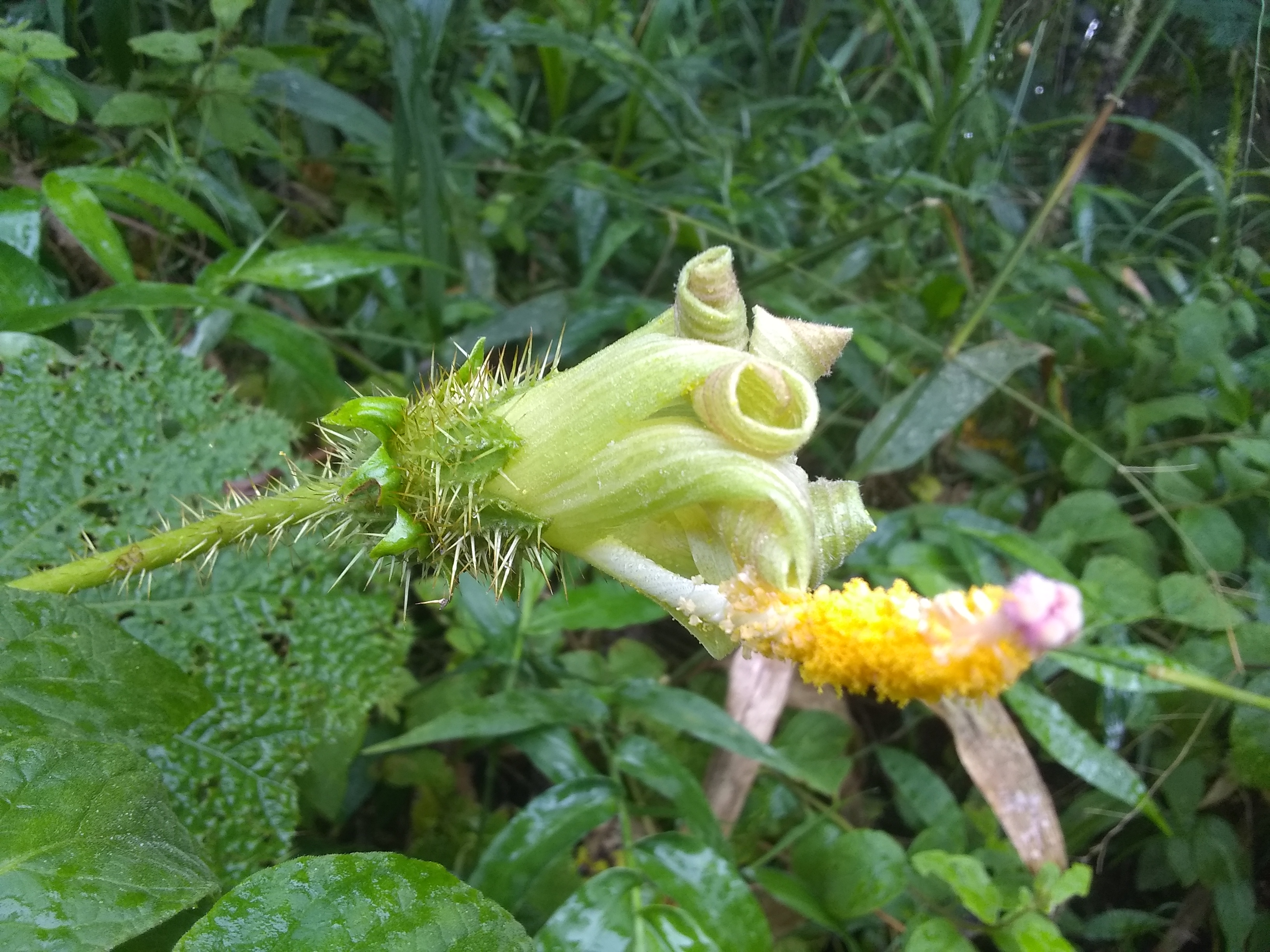
- Lateral view of Wercklea hottensis flower

Conservation status
- Endangered (IUCN 3.1)

Scientific classification
- Kingdom: Plantae
- Clade: Tracheophytes
- Clade: Angiosperms
- Clade: Eudicots
- Clade: Rosids
- Order: Malvales
- Family: Malvaceae
- Genus: Wercklea
- Species: W. hottensis

Binomial name
- Wercklea hottensis (Helwig ex Urb.) Fryxell
- It is native to the Massif de la Hotte, Haiti

Synonyms
- Hibiscus hottensis Helwig ex Urb.

= Wercklea hottensis =

Species of flowering plant in the family Malvaceae

Wercklea hottensis is a species of Malvaceae endemic to the mountains of the Massif de la Hotte in Haiti.

== Description ==
Wercklea hottensis growing in the Grand Bois National Park, Haiti

Wercklea hottensis flower

Wercklea hottensis is a 2–3 m tall shrub with glabrate stems bearing 3–6 mm long, yellow prickles.

== Taxonomy ==
It was first described as Hibiscus hottensis Helwig ex Urb. by Ignatz Urban in 1928 based on previous work by Burghard Helwig. It was moved to the genus Wercklea Pittier & Standl. as Wercklea hottensis (Helwig ex Urb.) Fryxell in 1982.

=== Etymology ===
The specific epithet hottensis refers to the Massif de la Hotte in Haiti.

== Distribution and habitat ==
It is endemic to the Massif de la Hotte, Haiti, where it grows in moist and open habitats at elevations of 1000–1300 m above sea level.

== Conservation ==
It is an endangered species.
