= Nectandra spicata =

Conservation status
- Data Deficient (IUCN 2.3)

Scientific classification
- Kingdom: Plantae
- Clade: Tracheophytes
- Clade: Angiosperms
- Clade: Magnoliids
- Order: Laurales
- Family: Lauraceae
- Genus: Nectandra
- Species: N. spicata

Binomial name
- Nectandra spicata Meisn.

Species of flowering plant

Nectandra spicata is a species of flowering plant in the family Lauraceae.

It is endemic to Rio de Janeiro city, in natural areas of the Atlantic Forest ecoregion, within Rio de Janeiro state, southeastern Brazil.

It is on the IUCN Red List, threatened by habitat loss in the city.
