= Nectandra angusta =

Conservation status
- Least Concern (IUCN 3.1)

Scientific classification
- Kingdom: Plantae
- Clade: Tracheophytes
- Clade: Angiosperms
- Clade: Magnoliids
- Order: Laurales
- Family: Lauraceae
- Genus: Nectandra
- Species: N. angusta

Binomial name
- Nectandra angusta Rohwer

Species of flowering plant

Nectandra angusta is a species of flowering plant in the family Lauraceae. It is a tree native to southern Bolivia and to Jujuy and Salta provinces of northwestern Argentina. It grows in seasonally dry foothill forests and montane moist forest (Yungas), typically along watercourses, on the eastern slopes of the Andes from 600 to 2,750 metres elevation.
