= Nectandra truxillensis =

Conservation status
- Vulnerable (IUCN 3.1)

Scientific classification
- Kingdom: Plantae
- Clade: Tracheophytes
- Clade: Angiosperms
- Clade: Magnoliids
- Order: Laurales
- Family: Lauraceae
- Genus: Nectandra
- Species: N. truxillensis

Binomial name
- Nectandra truxillensis (Meisn.) Mez

Synonyms
- Nectandra mucurubensis Lasser; Nectandra turbacensis var. truxillensis Meisn. (1864)

Species of flowering plant

Nectandra truxillensis (also called laurel mapurito) is a species of flowering plant in the family Lauraceae. It is a tree endemic to northwestern Venezuela.
