= Wercklea intermedia =

Conservation status
- Vulnerable (IUCN 3.1)

Scientific classification
- Kingdom: Plantae
- Clade: Tracheophytes
- Clade: Angiosperms
- Clade: Eudicots
- Clade: Rosids
- Order: Malvales
- Family: Malvaceae
- Genus: Wercklea
- Species: W. intermedia

Binomial name
- Wercklea intermedia Fryxell

Species of flowering plant

Wercklea intermedia is a species of plant in the family Malvaceae. It is endemic to Ecuador. Its natural habitat is subtropical or tropical moist lowland forests.
