= Nectandra olida =

Conservation status
- Least Concern (IUCN 3.1)

Scientific classification
- Kingdom: Plantae
- Clade: Tracheophytes
- Clade: Angiosperms
- Clade: Magnoliids
- Order: Laurales
- Family: Lauraceae
- Genus: Nectandra
- Species: N. olida

Binomial name
- Nectandra olida Rohwer

Species of tree

Nectandra olida is a species of plant in the family Lauraceae. It is a tree found in primarily the tropical rainforest of Ecuador and Peru. Its conservation status has been assessed to be of least concern, however the species is threatened by deforestation and the increasing number of fires in the region.
