= Nectandra paranaensis =

Conservation status
- Vulnerable (IUCN 2.3)

Scientific classification
- Kingdom: Plantae
- Clade: Tracheophytes
- Clade: Angiosperms
- Clade: Magnoliids
- Order: Laurales
- Family: Lauraceae
- Genus: Nectandra
- Species: N. paranaensis

Binomial name
- Nectandra paranaensis Coe-Teixeira

Species of flowering plant

Nectandra paranaensis is a species of plant in the family Lauraceae.

It is endemic to Paraná (state) and São Paulo (state) in Brazil.

It is a Vulnerable species, threatened by habitat loss.
