= Nectandra obtusata =

Conservation status
- Least Concern (IUCN 3.1)

Scientific classification
- Kingdom: Plantae
- Clade: Tracheophytes
- Clade: Angiosperms
- Clade: Magnoliids
- Order: Laurales
- Family: Lauraceae
- Genus: Nectandra
- Species: N. obtusata

Binomial name
- Nectandra obtusata Rohwer

Species of tree

Nectandra obtusata is a species of plant in the family Lauraceae. It is a tree native to Bolivia, Colombia and Ecuador.
