= Specklinia fulgens =

Scientific classification
- Kingdom: Plantae
- Clade: Tracheophytes
- Clade: Angiosperms
- Clade: Monocots
- Order: Asparagales
- Family: Orchidaceae
- Subfamily: Epidendroideae
- Genus: Specklinia
- Species: S. fulgens

Binomial name
- Specklinia fulgens (Rchb.f.) Pridgeon & M.W.Chase

Synonyms
- Pleurothallis fulgens Rchb.f.

Species of plant

Specklinia fulgens is a species of orchid plant native to Costa Rica.
