= Specklinia chontalensis =

Scientific classification
- Kingdom: Plantae
- Clade: Tracheophytes
- Clade: Angiosperms
- Clade: Monocots
- Order: Asparagales
- Family: Orchidaceae
- Subfamily: Epidendroideae
- Genus: Specklinia
- Species: S. chontalensis

Binomial name
- Specklinia chontalensis (A.H.Heller & A.D.Hawkes) Luer

Synonyms
- Pleurothallis chontalensis A.H.Heller & A.D.Hawkes

Species of plant

Specklinia chontalensis is a species of orchid plant native to Nicaragua.
