= Specklinia viridiflora =

Scientific classification
- Kingdom: Plantae
- Clade: Tracheophytes
- Clade: Angiosperms
- Clade: Monocots
- Order: Asparagales
- Family: Orchidaceae
- Subfamily: Epidendroideae
- Genus: Specklinia
- Species: S. viridiflora

Binomial name
- Specklinia viridiflora (Seehawer) F.J.de Jesus, M.R.Miranda & Chiron

Synonyms
- Pleurothallis viridiflora Seehawer

Species of plant

Specklinia viridiflora is a species of orchid plant native to Brazil.
