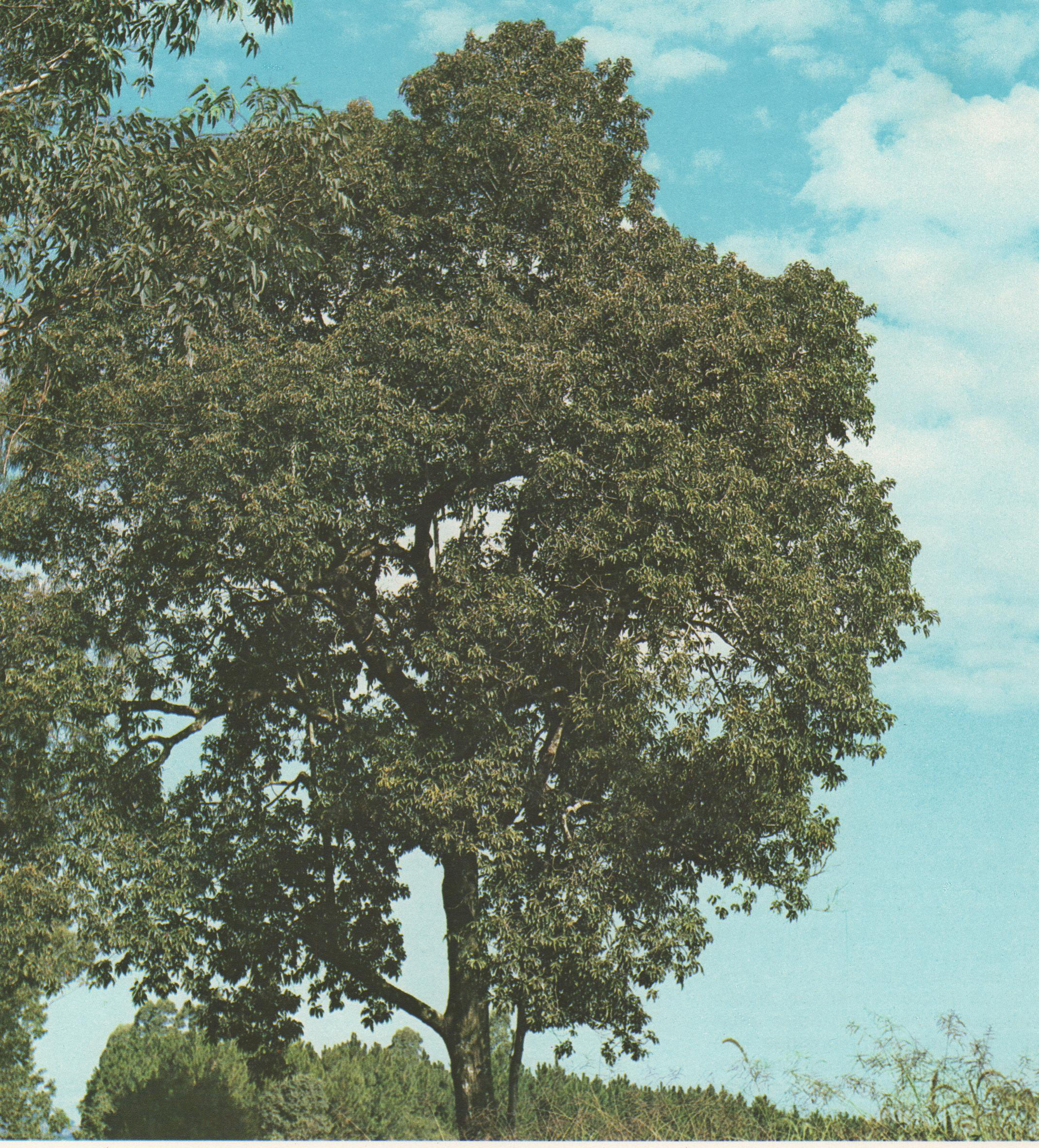
- Nectandra angustifolia

Scientific classification
- Kingdom: Plantae
- Clade: Tracheophytes
- Clade: Angiosperms
- Clade: Magnoliids
- Order: Laurales
- Family: Lauraceae
- Genus: Nectandra; Rol. ex Rottb.

Species
- 99; see text

Synonyms
- Perostema Raeusch., nom. nud.; Porostema Schreb.; Pomatium Nees ex Meisn.; Tamala Raf.

= Nectandra =

Genus of flowering plants

Nectandra is a genus of flowering plants in the family Lauraceae. They are primarily Neotropical, ranging from northern Mexico through Central America, the Caribbean, and tropical South America to northern Argentina. They have fruit with various medical effects. Sweetwood is a common name for some plants in this genus.

Several species formerly placed in Nectandra are now placed in genus Damburneya.

== Description ==
They are trees and bushes, hermaphrodites. The leaves are alternate, entire, glabrous or pubescent pinnatinervias with longitudinal grooves. Simple, alternate, petiole 0.9 to 2.2 cm in length canalicular limbo 11 to 28 cm long and 5 to 11 cm wide, with 16–28 secondary veins; base acute decurrent and revolute, entire, apex elliptically shaped, green dark, and very oblique secondary veins visible on the underside. Terminal buds are whitish. The inflorescences are pseudo-axillary and paniculate, the last divisions cimosas, mostly somewhat pubescent, the flowers are small, rarely more than 1 cm in diameter, and white or greenish tepals equal. The fruit is an ovoid, fleshy drupe with a reddish-pink dome, green when immature and black when ripe.

== Ecology ==
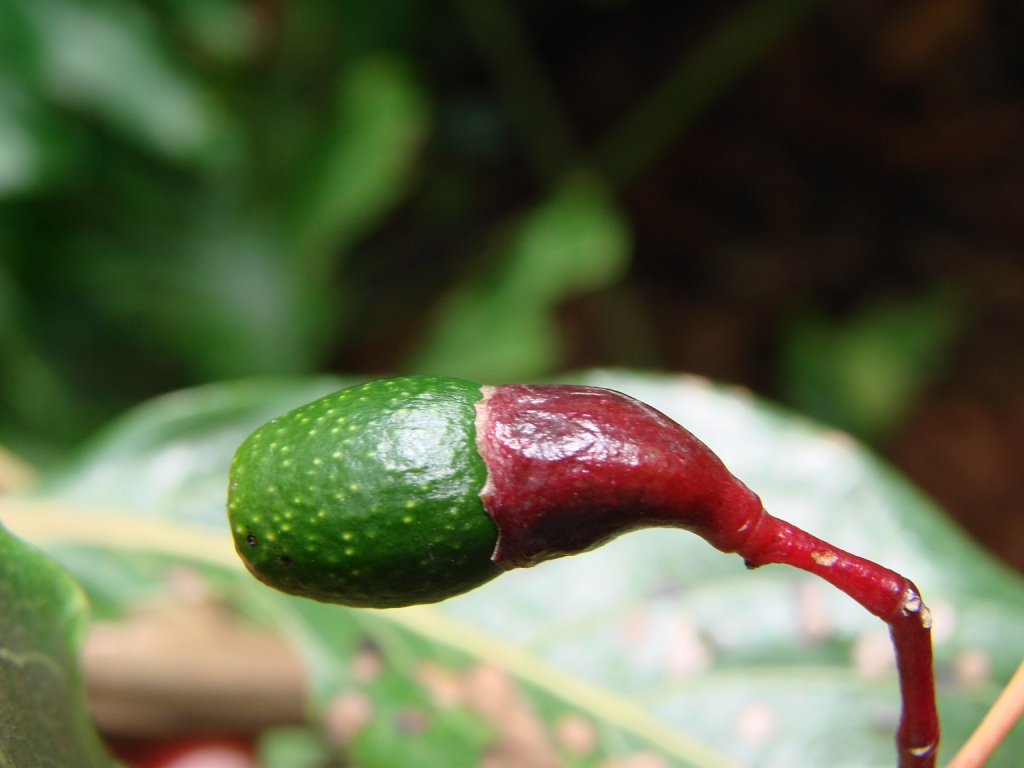
Nectandra cissiflora berry.

A neotropical genus with 99 species, Nectandra is similar to Ocotea, to which it is closely related. The most characteristic distinguishing features are the position of the locules in the anther (in an arc in Nectandra and two rows in Ocotea); papillose pubescence is present; the Nectandra petals are fused at the base itself and fall as a unit in the old flowers; they are free in Nectandra but fall individually in Ocotea.

Medium trees reach 60 cm in diameter and 25 m in height with straight, slender, cylindrical boles with low low and thin protuberances at the base. The various species are located in the middle stratum of forests. Many species are used as timber.

The family Lauraceae was part of the Gondwanaland flora, and many of its genera migrated to South America via Antarctica on ocean landbridges during the Paleocene era. There, they spread over most of the continent. When the North American and South American tectonic plates joined in the late Neogene, volcanic mountains started creating island chains, later forming the Meso-American landbridge.

Pliocene elevation created new habitats for speciation. While some genera died out in increasingly xerophytic Africa, starting with the freezing of Antarctica about 20 million years ago and the formation of the Benguela current, others, like Beilschmiedia and Nectandra, which also reached south and meso-America, are still surviving today in Africa in several species. The genus Persea, however, died out in Africa, except for Persea indica, surviving in the fog-shrouded mountains of the Canary Islands, which, with Madagascar, constitutes Africa's Laurel forest plant refugia. In Meso-America, the genus Nectandra proliferated into new species, and some of its berries constitute a valuable food supply for the quetzal bird that lives in the montane rainforests. Since this habitat is constantly threatened by encroaching agriculture, the laurel forest animal and plant species have already become rare in many of its former habitats and are threatened by habitat loss.

== Medical use ==
Plants from this genus have been used to treat several human clinical disorders. It has been demonstrated that Nectandra plants have potential for analgesic, anti-inflammatory, febrifuge, energetic, and hypotensive activities. Nectandra has also been investigated as a possible antitumoral agent, and the presence of neolignans suggests its potential use as a source of chemotherapeutics. Crude extracts of Nectandra contain alkaloids and lignans, berberine and sipirine.

Some authors have postulated that tannins play important roles as antioxidant compounds in scavenging free radicals. It is reported that an extract of N. salicifolia has potent relaxant activity on vascular smooth muscle. Researchers around the entire world agree that extensive pre-clinical studies on herbal medicine are important and urgent, especially high-quality clinical and pre-clinical trials.

In pre-Columbian Peru the seeds, called amala in Spanish, were used as a muscle relaxant. In sites of the Sican culture, collections of the seeds have been associated with human sacrifice, and used to incapacitate victims prior to being killed.

== Species ==
99 species are accepted.

- Nectandra acuminata (Nees & Mart.) J.F.Macbr.
- Nectandra acutifolia (Ruiz & Pav.) Mez
- Nectandra amazonum Nees
- Nectandra angusta Rohwer
- Nectandra angustifolia (Schrad.) Nees & Mart.
- Nectandra apiculata Rohwer
- Nectandra astyla Rohwer
- Nectandra aurea Rohwer
- Nectandra baccans (Klotzsch & H.Karst. ex Meisn.) Mez
- Nectandra barbellata Coe-Teix.
- Nectandra bartlettiana Lasser
- Nectandra belizensis (Lundell) C.K.Allen
- Nectandra briquetii Hassl.
- Nectandra brittonii Mez
- Nectandra brochidodroma Rohwer
- Nectandra canaliculata Rohwer
- Nectandra canescens Nees & Mart.
- Nectandra caudatoacuminata O.C.Schmidt
- Nectandra cerifolia Rohwer
- Nectandra cissiflora Nees
- Nectandra citrifolia Rusby
- Nectandra coeloclada Rohwer
- Nectandra cordata Rohwer
- Nectandra crassiloba Rohwer
- Nectandra cuneatocordata Mez
- Nectandra cuspidata Nees & Mart.
- Nectandra dasystyla Rohwer
- Nectandra debilis Mez
- Nectandra discolor (Kunth) Nees
- Nectandra egensis Rohwer
- Nectandra embirensis Coe-Teixeira
- Nectandra filiflora Rohwer
- Nectandra fragrans Rohwer
- Nectandra fulva Rohwer
- Nectandra furcata Nees
- Nectandra gardneri Meisn.
- Nectandra globosa (Aubl.) Mez
- Nectandra gracilis Rohwer
- Nectandra grandiflora Nees & Mart.
- Nectandra grisea Rohwer
- Nectandra guadaripo Rohwer
- Nectandra herrerae O.C.Schmidt
- Nectandra heterotricha Rohwer
- Nectandra hihua (Ruiz & Pav.) Rohwer
- Nectandra hirtella Rohwer
- Nectandra hypoleuca Hammel
- Nectandra impressa Mez
- Nectandra japurensis Nees
- Nectandra krugii Mez
- Nectandra lanceolata Nees & Mart.
- Nectandra latissima Rohwer
- Nectandra laurel Klotzsch ex Nees
- Nectandra leucantha Nees & Mart.
- Nectandra lineata (Kunth) Rohwer
- Nectandra lineatifolia (Ruiz & Pav.) Mez
- Nectandra longifolia (Ruiz & Pav.) Nees
- Nectandra maguireana C.K.Allen
- Nectandra matogrossensis Coe-Teix.
- Nectandra matthewsii Meisn.
- Nectandra maynensis Mez
- Nectandra membranacea (Sw.) Griseb.
- Nectandra micranthera Rohwer
- Nectandra microcarpa Meisn.
- Nectandra mollis (Kunth) Nees
- Nectandra moritziana Klotzsch ex Nees
- Nectandra nitidula Nees & Mart.
- Nectandra obtusata Rohwer
- Nectandra olida Rohwer
- Nectandra oppositifolia Nees & Mart.
- Nectandra ovatocaudata Rohwer
- Nectandra paranaensis Coe-Teix.
- Nectandra parviflora Rohwer
- Nectandra paucinervia Coe-Teix.
- Nectandra pearcei Mez
- Nectandra pichurim (Kunth) Mez
- Nectandra psammophila Nees & Mart.
- Nectandra pseudocotea C.K.Allen & Barneby ex Rohwer
- Nectandra puberula (Schott) Nees
- Nectandra pulchra Ekman & O.C.Schmidt
- Nectandra ramonensis Standl.
- Nectandra pulverulenta Nees
- Nectandra ramonensis Standl.
- Nectandra reflexa Rohwer
- Nectandra riparia Rohwer
- Nectandra rubriflora (Mez) C.K.Allen
- Nectandra ruforamula Rohwer
- Nectandra sanguinea Rol.
- Nectandra sordida Rohwer
- Nectandra spicata Meisn.
- Nectandra subbullata Rohwer
- Nectandra tomentosa van der Werff
- Nectandra truxillensis (Meisn.) Mez
- Nectandra turbacensis (Kunth) Nees
- Nectandra utilis Rohwer
- Nectandra venulosa Meisn.
- Nectandra viburnoides Meisn.
- Nectandra warmingii Meisn. ex Warm.
- Nectandra weddellii Meisn.
- Nectandra wurdackii C.K.Allen & Barneby ex Rohwer
- Nectandra yarinensis O.C.Schmidt
