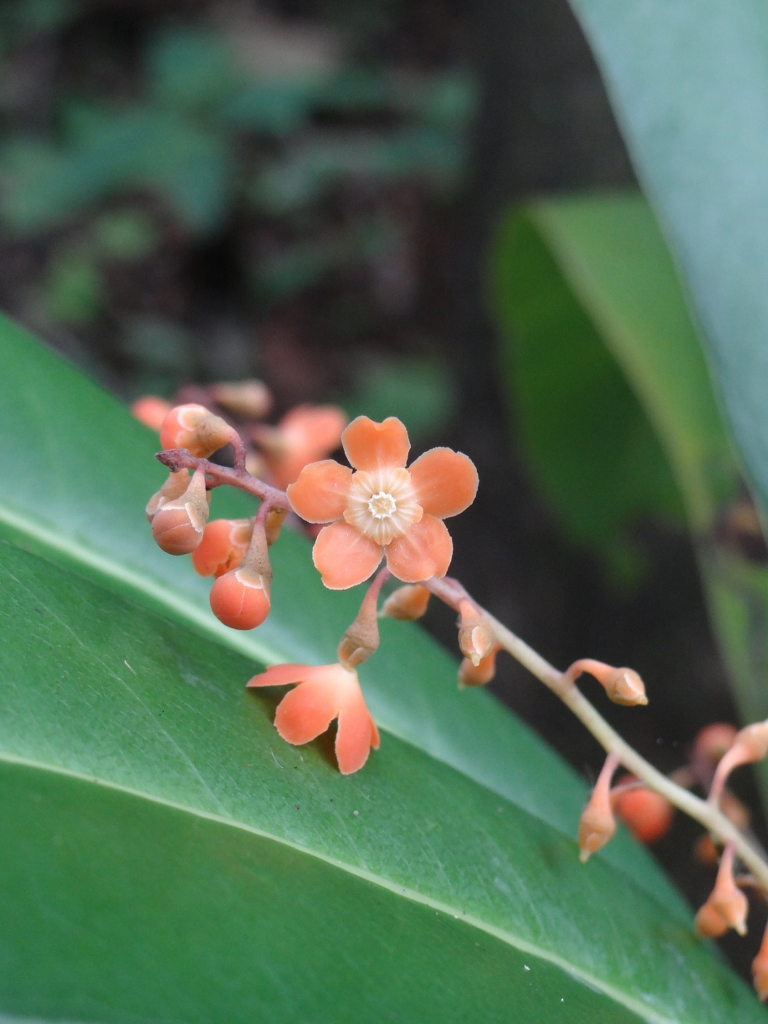
- An image of the flower

Scientific classification
- Kingdom: Plantae
- Clade: Tracheophytes
- Clade: Angiosperms
- Clade: Eudicots
- Clade: Asterids
- Order: Ericales
- Family: Primulaceae
- Genus: Clavija; Ruiz & Pav.

= Clavija =

Genus of flowering plants

Clavija is a genus of flowering plants belonging to the family Primulaceae.

Its native range is Tropical America.

Species:

- Clavija biborrana Oerst.
- Clavija caloneura Mart. ex Miq.
- Clavija cardenasii Rusby
- Clavija cauliflora Regel
- Clavija clavata Decne.
- Clavija colombiana B.Ståhl
- Clavija costaricana Pittier
- Clavija domingensis Urb. & Ekman
- Clavija eggersiana Mez
- Clavija elliptica Mez
- Clavija engelsii Mez
- Clavija euerganea J.F.Macbr.
- Clavija fernandezii Philipson
- Clavija fusca B.Ståhl
- Clavija grandis Decne.
- Clavija harlingii B.Ståhl
- Clavija hookeri DC.
- Clavija imatacae B.Ståhl
- Clavija imazae B.Ståhl
- Clavija jelskii Szyszyl.
- Clavija kalbreyeri (Kuntze) Mez
- Clavija killipii B.Ståhl
- Clavija lancifolia Desf.
- Clavija laplanadae B.Ståhl
- Clavija latifolia (Willd. ex Roem. & Schult.) K.Koch
- Clavija lehmannii Mez
- Clavija leucocraspeda B.Ståhl
- Clavija longifolia Ruiz & Pav.
- Clavija macrocarpa Ruiz & Pav.
- Clavija macrophylla (Link ex Roem. & Schult.) Miq.
- Clavija membranacea Mez
- Clavija mezii Pittier
- Clavija minor B.Ståhl
- Clavija myrmeciocarpa B.Ståhl
- Clavija neglecta B.Ståhl
- Clavija nutans (Vell.) B.Ståhl
- Clavija obtusifolia B.Ståhl
- Clavija ornata D.Don
- Clavija parvula Mez
- Clavija peruviana B.Ståhl
- Clavija plumbea B.Ståhl
- Clavija poeppigii Mez
- Clavija procera B.Ståhl
- Clavija pubens D'Arcy
- Clavija pungens (Willd. ex Roem. & Schult.) Decne.
- Clavija repanda B.Ståhl
- Clavija rodekiana Linden & André
- Clavija sanctae-martae B.Ståhl
- Clavija serratifolia Mez
- Clavija spinosa (Vell.) Mez
- Clavija subandina B.Ståhl
- Clavija tarapotana Mez
- Clavija umbrosa (Linden) Regel
- Clavija venosa B.Ståhl
- Clavija wallnoeferi B.Ståhl
- Clavija weberbaueri Mez
