= Nectandra bartlettiana =

Conservation status
- Vulnerable (IUCN 3.1)

Scientific classification
- Kingdom: Plantae
- Clade: Tracheophytes
- Clade: Angiosperms
- Clade: Magnoliids
- Order: Laurales
- Family: Lauraceae
- Genus: Nectandra
- Species: N. bartlettiana

Binomial name
- Nectandra bartlettiana Lasser

Species of flowering plant

Nectandra bartlettiana is a species of flowering plant in the family Lauraceae. It is a tree endemic to northwestern Venezuela.

The species was described in 1942 by Tobias Lasser.
