= Specklinia brighamella =

Scientific classification
- Kingdom: Plantae
- Clade: Tracheophytes
- Clade: Angiosperms
- Clade: Monocots
- Order: Asparagales
- Family: Orchidaceae
- Subfamily: Epidendroideae
- Genus: Specklinia
- Species: S. brighamella

Binomial name
- Specklinia brighamella (Luer) Pridgeon & M.W.Chase

Synonyms
- Pleurothallis brighamella Luer

Species of plant

Specklinia brighamella is a species of orchid plant native to Panama.
