= Nectandra brittonii =

Conservation status
- Endangered (IUCN 3.1)

Scientific classification
- Kingdom: Plantae
- Clade: Embryophytes
- Clade: Tracheophytes
- Clade: Spermatophytes
- Clade: Angiosperms
- Clade: Magnoliids
- Order: Laurales
- Family: Lauraceae
- Genus: Nectandra
- Species: N. brittonii

Binomial name
- Nectandra brittonii Mez

Synonyms
- Heterotypic Synonyms: Nectandra albeno Rojas Acosta

Species of tree

Nectandra brittonii is a species of flowering plant in the family Lauraceae. It is a tree native to Bolivia and Peru.
