= Miconia ayisyena =

Conservation status
- Endangered (IUCN 3.1)

Scientific classification
- Kingdom: Plantae
- Clade: Tracheophytes
- Clade: Angiosperms
- Clade: Eudicots
- Clade: Rosids
- Order: Myrtales
- Family: Melastomataceae
- Genus: Miconia
- Species: M. ayisyena

Binomial name
- Miconia ayisyena Skean, Judd & Majure (2018)

Synonyms
- Mecranium haitiense Urb. (1921); Mecranium salicifolium Urb. (1929)

Species of shrub

Miconia ayisyena is a species of plant in the family Melastomataceae. It is an evergreen shrub endemic to the Massif de la Hotte in Haiti.
