= Specklinia wrightii =

Scientific classification
- Kingdom: Plantae
- Clade: Tracheophytes
- Clade: Angiosperms
- Clade: Monocots
- Order: Asparagales
- Family: Orchidaceae
- Subfamily: Epidendroideae
- Genus: Specklinia
- Species: S. wrightii

Binomial name
- Specklinia wrightii (Rchb.f.) Luer

Synonyms
- Pleurothallis wrightii Rchb.f.

Species of orchid

Specklinia wrightii is a species of orchid plant native to Cuba.
