= Wercklea grandiflora =

Conservation status
- Endangered (IUCN 2.3)

Scientific classification
- Kingdom: Plantae
- Clade: Tracheophytes
- Clade: Angiosperms
- Clade: Eudicots
- Clade: Rosids
- Order: Malvales
- Family: Malvaceae
- Genus: Wercklea
- Species: W. grandiflora

Binomial name
- Wercklea grandiflora Fryxell

Species of flowering plant

Wercklea grandiflora is a species of plant in the family Malvaceae. It is endemic to Panama. It is threatened by habitat loss.
