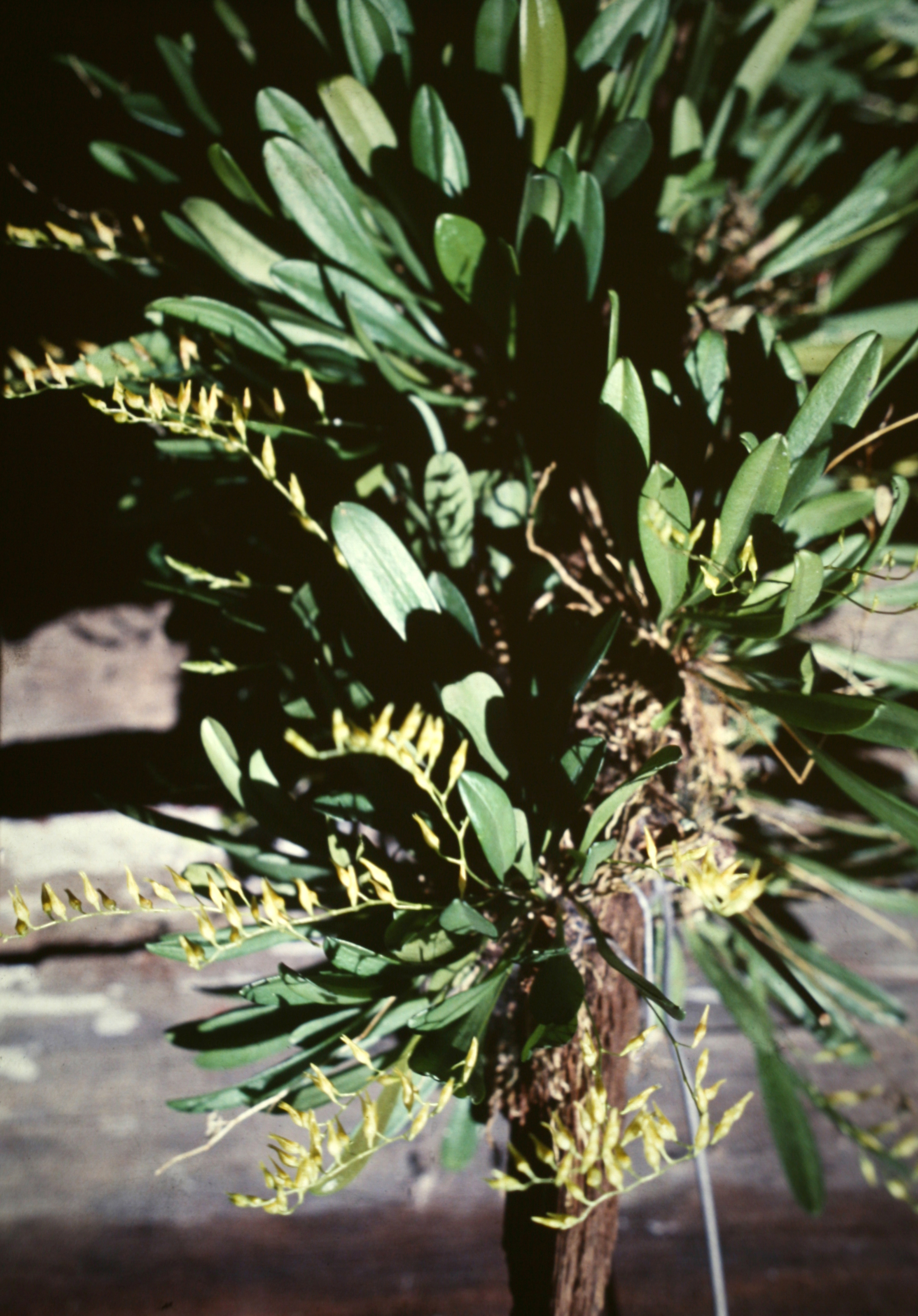

Scientific classification
- Kingdom: Plantae
- Clade: Tracheophytes
- Clade: Angiosperms
- Clade: Monocots
- Order: Asparagales
- Family: Orchidaceae
- Subfamily: Epidendroideae
- Genus: Specklinia
- Species: S. grobyi

Binomial name
- Specklinia grobyi (Bateman ex Lindl.) F.Barros

= Specklinia grobyi =

Species of orchid

Specklinia grobyi is a species of orchid broadly distributed from southern Mexico through most of northern South America. It was formerly placed in the genera Humboltia, Lepanthes, Pabstiella, and Pleurothallis.
