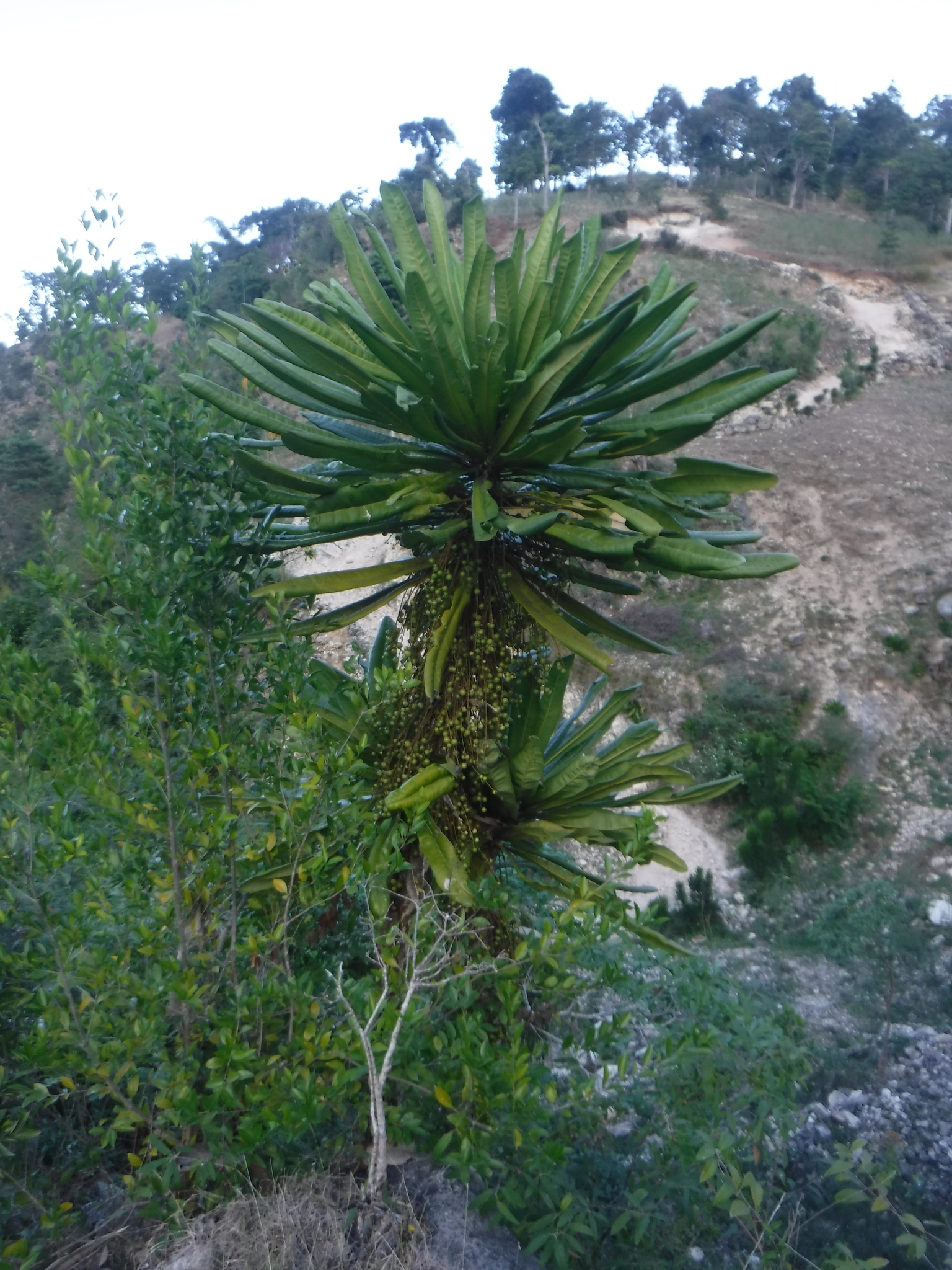

Conservation status
- Critically Endangered (IUCN 3.1)

Scientific classification
- Kingdom: Plantae
- Clade: Tracheophytes
- Clade: Angiosperms
- Clade: Eudicots
- Clade: Asterids
- Order: Ericales
- Family: Primulaceae
- Genus: Clavija
- Species: C. domingensis

Binomial name
- Clavija domingensis Urb. & Ekman

= Clavija domingensis =

Species of plant

Clavija domingensis is a species of plant in the family Primulaceae.

== Description ==
Clavija domingensis is an unbranched shrub that grows to 4 meters (13 feet) tall. The long simple leaves grow from the top of the trunk, giving the plant a palm-like appearance. The long leathery leaves inspired the Haitian Creole name of the plant: lang bèf (lit. "cow's tongue"). Flowers and fruit are born on long pending racemes.

== Range ==
This species is endemic to the Massif de la Hotte on the Tiburon Peninsula in South Western Haiti.

== Etymology ==
The species has been given the specific epithet "domingensis", as it occurs on the island of Hispaniola. This island was historically called Santo Domingo, or Saint-Domingue.
