= Nectandra ruforamula =

Conservation status
- Endangered (IUCN 3.1)

Scientific classification
- Kingdom: Plantae
- Clade: Tracheophytes
- Clade: Angiosperms
- Clade: Magnoliids
- Order: Laurales
- Family: Lauraceae
- Genus: Nectandra
- Species: N. ruforamula

Binomial name
- Nectandra ruforamula Rohwer

Species of flowering plant

Nectandra ruforamula is a species of plant in the family Lauraceae. It is endemic to Venezuela.
