= Nectandra venulosa =

Conservation status
- Data Deficient (IUCN 3.1)

Scientific classification
- Kingdom: Plantae
- Clade: Tracheophytes
- Clade: Angiosperms
- Clade: Magnoliids
- Order: Laurales
- Family: Lauraceae
- Genus: Nectandra
- Species: N. venulosa

Binomial name
- Nectandra venulosa Meisn.

Species of flowering plant

Nectandra venulosa is a species of flowering plant in the family Lauraceae. It is a tree endemic to Minas Gerais state in southeastern Brazil.
