= Specklinia brighamii =

Scientific classification
- Kingdom: Plantae
- Clade: Tracheophytes
- Clade: Angiosperms
- Clade: Monocots
- Order: Asparagales
- Family: Orchidaceae
- Subfamily: Epidendroideae
- Genus: Specklinia
- Species: S. brighamii

Binomial name
- Specklinia brighamii (S.Watson) Pridgeon & M.W.Chase

Synonyms
- Pleurothallis brighamii S.Watson

Species of plant

Specklinia brighamii is a species of orchid plant native to Belize and Guatemala.
