= Wercklea cocleana =

Conservation status
- Endangered (IUCN 2.3)

Scientific classification
- Kingdom: Plantae
- Clade: Tracheophytes
- Clade: Angiosperms
- Clade: Eudicots
- Clade: Rosids
- Order: Malvales
- Family: Malvaceae
- Genus: Wercklea
- Species: W. cocleana

Binomial name
- Wercklea cocleana (A.Robyns) Fryxell

Synonyms
- Hibiscus cocleanus A.Robyns

Species of flowering plant

Wercklea cocleana is a species of plant in the family Malvaceae. It is endemic to Panama. It is threatened by habitat loss.
