= Nectandra warmingii =

Conservation status
- Least Concern (IUCN 3.1)

Scientific classification
- Kingdom: Plantae
- Clade: Tracheophytes
- Clade: Angiosperms
- Clade: Magnoliids
- Order: Laurales
- Family: Lauraceae
- Genus: Nectandra
- Species: N. warmingii

Binomial name
- Nectandra warmingii Meisn. ex Warm.

Species of flowering plant

Nectandra warmingii is a species of flowering plant in the family Lauraceae. It is endemic to Bahia and Minas Gerais states in eastern Brazil, where it grows in Cerrado savanna, gallery forests along streams, and dry forests.
