= Nectandra fulva =

Conservation status
- Vulnerable (IUCN 3.1)

Scientific classification
- Kingdom: Plantae
- Clade: Tracheophytes
- Clade: Angiosperms
- Clade: Magnoliids
- Order: Laurales
- Family: Lauraceae
- Genus: Nectandra
- Species: N. fulva

Binomial name
- Nectandra fulva Rohwer

Species of flowering plant

Nectandra fulva is a species of plant in the family Lauraceae. It is endemic to Venezuela.
