= Specklinia ciliifera =

Scientific classification
- Kingdom: Plantae
- Clade: Tracheophytes
- Clade: Angiosperms
- Clade: Monocots
- Order: Asparagales
- Family: Orchidaceae
- Subfamily: Epidendroideae
- Genus: Specklinia
- Species: S. ciliifera

Binomial name
- Specklinia ciliifera (Luer) Luer

Synonyms
- Pleurothallis ciliifera Luer

Species of plant

Specklinia ciliifera is a species of orchid plant native to the Dominican Republic.
