= Nectandra psammophila =

Conservation status
- Least Concern (IUCN 3.1)

Scientific classification
- Kingdom: Plantae
- Clade: Tracheophytes
- Clade: Angiosperms
- Clade: Magnoliids
- Order: Laurales
- Family: Lauraceae
- Genus: Nectandra
- Species: N. psammophila

Binomial name
- Nectandra psammophila Nees

Synonyms
- Nectandra araujovii Schwacke & Mez; Nectandra riedelii Meisn.; Nectandra riedelii var. longipaniculata Vattimo-Gil; Ocotea minarum var. canescens (Meisn.) Mez; Ocotea psammophila Mart. ex Nees; Oreodaphne canescens Meisn.; Persea psammophila Mart. ex Meisn.; Persea tubigera Mart. ex Nees

Species of flowering plant

Nectandra psammophila is a species of flowering plant in the family Lauraceae. It is a tree endemic to the Atlantic Forest ecoregion of eastern Brazil, ranging from southeastern Bahia to São Paulo state. It is threatened by habitat loss.
