= Specklinia jesupii =

Scientific classification
- Kingdom: Plantae
- Clade: Tracheophytes
- Clade: Angiosperms
- Clade: Monocots
- Order: Asparagales
- Family: Orchidaceae
- Subfamily: Epidendroideae
- Genus: Specklinia
- Species: S. jesupii

Binomial name
- Specklinia jesupii (Luer) Luer

Synonyms
- Pleurothallis jesupii Luer

Species of plant

Specklinia jesupii is a species of orchid plant native to the Dominican Republic.
