= Nectandra microcarpa =

Conservation status
- Near Threatened (IUCN 2.3)

Scientific classification
- Kingdom: Plantae
- Clade: Tracheophytes
- Clade: Angiosperms
- Clade: Magnoliids
- Order: Laurales
- Family: Lauraceae
- Genus: Nectandra
- Species: N. microcarpa

Binomial name
- Nectandra microcarpa Meisn.

Species of tree

Nectandra microcarpa is a species of flowering plant in the family Lauraceae. It is found in a tree native to northern Brazil, Colombia, Ecuador, and Peru.

The species was described by Carl Meissner in 1864.
