= Nectandra impressa =

Conservation status
- Data Deficient (IUCN 3.1)

Scientific classification
- Kingdom: Plantae
- Clade: Tracheophytes
- Clade: Angiosperms
- Clade: Magnoliids
- Order: Laurales
- Family: Lauraceae
- Genus: Nectandra
- Species: N. impressa

Binomial name
- Nectandra impressa Mez

Species of flowering plant

Nectandra impressa is a species of flowering plant in the family Lauraceae. It is a tree endemic to the Amazon rainforest of Pará state in northern Brazil.
