= Specklinia scolopax =

Scientific classification
- Kingdom: Plantae
- Clade: Tracheophytes
- Clade: Angiosperms
- Clade: Monocots
- Order: Asparagales
- Family: Orchidaceae
- Subfamily: Epidendroideae
- Genus: Specklinia
- Species: S. scolopax

Binomial name
- Specklinia scolopax (Luer & R.Escobar) Pridgeon & M.W.Chase

Synonyms
- Pleurothallis scolopax Luer & R.Escobar

Species of plant

Specklinia scolopax is a species of orchid plant native to Colombia.
