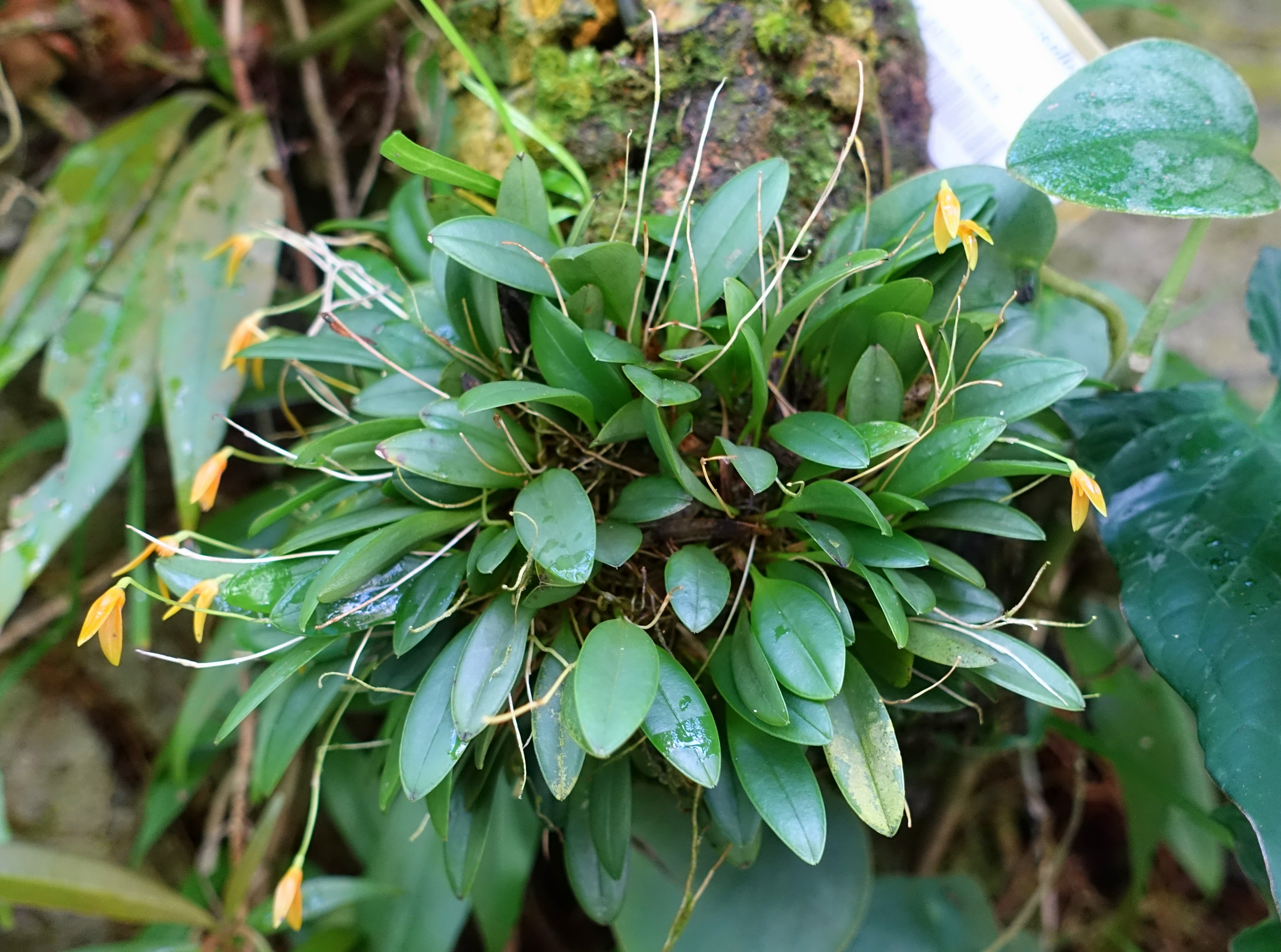

Scientific classification
- Kingdom: Plantae
- Clade: Tracheophytes
- Clade: Angiosperms
- Clade: Monocots
- Order: Asparagales
- Family: Orchidaceae
- Subfamily: Epidendroideae
- Genus: Specklinia
- Species: S. corniculata

Binomial name
- Specklinia corniculata (Sw.) Mutel

Synonyms
- Cymbidium corniculatum (Sw.) Spreng.; Dendrobium corniculatum (Sw.) Sw.; Epidendrum corniculatum Sw.; Humboltia corniculata (Sw.) Kuntze; Humboltia pyrsodes (Rchb.f.) Kuntze; Humboltia vilipensa (Rchb.f.) Kuntze; Physosiphon emarginatus (Lindl.) Lindl.; Pleurothallis barboselloides Schltr.; Pleurothallis corniculata (Sw.) Lindl.; Pleurothallis jocolensis Ames; Pleurothallis nubigena Lindl.; Pleurothallis pyrsodes Rchb.f.; Pleurothallis vilipensa Rchb.f.; Sarcinula corniculata (Sw.) Luer; Specklinia barboselloides (Schltr.) Pridgeon & M.W.Chase; Specklinia emarginata Lindl.; Specklinia pyrsodes (Rchb.f.) Pridgeon & M.W.Chase

= Specklinia corniculata =

Species of plant

Specklinia corniculata is a species of plant native to Belize, Colombia, Costa Rica, Cuba, French Guiana, Guatemala, Guyana, Haiti, Honduras, Nicaragua, Panama, Suriname, and Venezuela.
