= Nectandra citrifolia =

Conservation status
- Endangered (IUCN 3.1)

Scientific classification
- Kingdom: Plantae
- Clade: Tracheophytes
- Clade: Angiosperms
- Clade: Magnoliids
- Order: Laurales
- Family: Lauraceae
- Genus: Nectandra
- Species: N. citrifolia

Binomial name
- Nectandra citrifolia Rusby

Species of tree

Nectandra citrifolia is a species of plant in the family Lauraceae. It is found in Bolivia and Peru.
