= Specklinia alexii =

Scientific classification
- Kingdom: Plantae
- Clade: Tracheophytes
- Clade: Angiosperms
- Clade: Monocots
- Order: Asparagales
- Family: Orchidaceae
- Subfamily: Epidendroideae
- Genus: Specklinia
- Species: S. alexii

Binomial name
- Specklinia alexii (A.H.Heller) Pridgeon & M.W.Chase

Synonyms
- Pleurothallis alexii A.H.Heller

Species of plant

Specklinia alexii is a species of orchid plant native to Costa Rica, Nicaragua.
