= Specklinia curtisii =

Scientific classification
- Kingdom: Plantae
- Clade: Tracheophytes
- Clade: Angiosperms
- Clade: Monocots
- Order: Asparagales
- Family: Orchidaceae
- Subfamily: Epidendroideae
- Genus: Specklinia
- Species: S. curtisii

Binomial name
- Specklinia curtisii (Dod) Pridgeon & M.W.Chase

Synonyms
- Pleurothallis curtisii Dod

Species of plant

Specklinia curtisii is a species of orchid plant native to Haiti.
