= Nectandra herrerae =

Conservation status
- Endangered (IUCN 3.1)

Scientific classification
- Kingdom: Plantae
- Clade: Tracheophytes
- Clade: Angiosperms
- Clade: Magnoliids
- Order: Laurales
- Family: Lauraceae
- Genus: Nectandra
- Species: N. herrerae

Binomial name
- Nectandra herrerae O. C. Schmidt

Species of plant

Nectandra herrerae is a species of plant in the family Lauraceae. It is endemic to Peru. It is threatened by habitat loss.
