= Specklinia trichyphis =

Scientific classification
- Kingdom: Plantae
- Clade: Tracheophytes
- Clade: Angiosperms
- Clade: Monocots
- Order: Asparagales
- Family: Orchidaceae
- Subfamily: Epidendroideae
- Genus: Specklinia
- Species: S. trichyphis

Binomial name
- Specklinia trichyphis (Rchb.f.) Luer

Synonyms
- Pleurothallis trichyphis Rchb.f.

Species of orchid

Specklinia trichyphis is a species of orchid plant native to Cuba.
