= Nectandra pulchra =

Conservation status
- Critically Endangered (IUCN 3.1)

Scientific classification
- Kingdom: Plantae
- Clade: Tracheophytes
- Clade: Angiosperms
- Clade: Magnoliids
- Order: Laurales
- Family: Lauraceae
- Genus: Nectandra
- Species: N. pulchra

Binomial name
- Nectandra pulchra Ekman & O.C.Schmidt

Species of flowering plant

Nectandra pulchra is a species of plant in the family Lauraceae. It is a tree endemic to Morne Rochelois in Haiti. It is threatened by habitat loss.
