= Specklinia grisebachiana =

Scientific classification
- Kingdom: Plantae
- Clade: Tracheophytes
- Clade: Angiosperms
- Clade: Monocots
- Order: Asparagales
- Family: Orchidaceae
- Subfamily: Epidendroideae
- Genus: Specklinia
- Species: S. grisebachiana

Binomial name
- Specklinia grisebachiana (Cogn.) Luer

Synonyms
- Pleurothallis blepharoglossa Luer

Species of plant

Specklinia grisebachiana is a species of orchid plant native to Cuba and the Dominican Republic.
