= Specklinia subpicta =

Scientific classification
- Kingdom: Plantae
- Clade: Tracheophytes
- Clade: Angiosperms
- Clade: Monocots
- Order: Asparagales
- Family: Orchidaceae
- Subfamily: Epidendroideae
- Genus: Specklinia
- Species: S. subpicta

Binomial name
- Specklinia subpicta (Schltr.) F.Barros

Synonyms
- Pleurothallis subpicta Schltr.

Species of plant

Specklinia subpicta is a species of orchid plant native to Brazil.
