= Specklinia barbae =

Scientific classification
- Kingdom: Plantae
- Clade: Tracheophytes
- Clade: Angiosperms
- Clade: Monocots
- Order: Asparagales
- Family: Orchidaceae
- Subfamily: Epidendroideae
- Genus: Specklinia
- Species: S. barbae

Binomial name
- Specklinia barbae (Schltr.) Luer

Synonyms
- Pleurothallis barbae Schltr.

Species of orchid

Specklinia barbae is a species of orchid plant native to Costa Rica.
