= Specklinia blancoi =

Scientific classification
- Kingdom: Plantae
- Clade: Tracheophytes
- Clade: Angiosperms
- Clade: Monocots
- Order: Asparagales
- Family: Orchidaceae
- Subfamily: Epidendroideae
- Genus: Specklinia
- Species: S. blancoi

Binomial name
- Specklinia blancoi (Pupulin) Soto Arenas & Solano

Synonyms
- Pleurothallis blancoi Pupulin

Species of orchid

Specklinia blancoi is a species of orchid plant native to Costa Rica.
