= Nectandra embirensis =

Conservation status
- Data Deficient (IUCN 3.1)

Scientific classification
- Kingdom: Plantae
- Clade: Tracheophytes
- Clade: Angiosperms
- Clade: Magnoliids
- Order: Laurales
- Family: Lauraceae
- Genus: Nectandra
- Species: N. embirensis

Binomial name
- Nectandra embirensis Coe-Teixeira

Species of tree

Nectandra embirensis is a species of plant in the family Lauraceae. It is found in Brazil, Ecuador, and Peru. It is threatened by habitat loss.
