= Nectandra baccans =

Conservation status
- Vulnerable (IUCN 3.1)

Scientific classification
- Kingdom: Plantae
- Clade: Tracheophytes
- Clade: Angiosperms
- Clade: Magnoliids
- Order: Laurales
- Family: Lauraceae
- Genus: Nectandra
- Species: N. baccans

Binomial name
- Nectandra baccans (Klotzsch & H.Karst. ex Meisn.) Mez

Synonyms
- Mespilodaphne baccans Klotzsch & H.Karst. ex Meisn. (1864); Nectandra canescens var. diversifolia Nees; Nectandra diversifolia Nees; Nectandra steyermarkiana C.K.Allen

Species of flowering plant

Nectandra baccans is a species of flowering plant in the family Lauraceae. It is a tree native to Colombia, Peru, and Venezuela.
