= Nectandra japurensis =

Conservation status
- Vulnerable (IUCN 3.1)

Scientific classification
- Kingdom: Plantae
- Clade: Tracheophytes
- Clade: Angiosperms
- Clade: Magnoliids
- Order: Laurales
- Family: Lauraceae
- Genus: Nectandra
- Species: N. japurensis

Binomial name
- Nectandra japurensis Nees

Species of tree

Nectandra japurensis is a species of plant in the family Lauraceae. It is found in Brazil and Peru.
