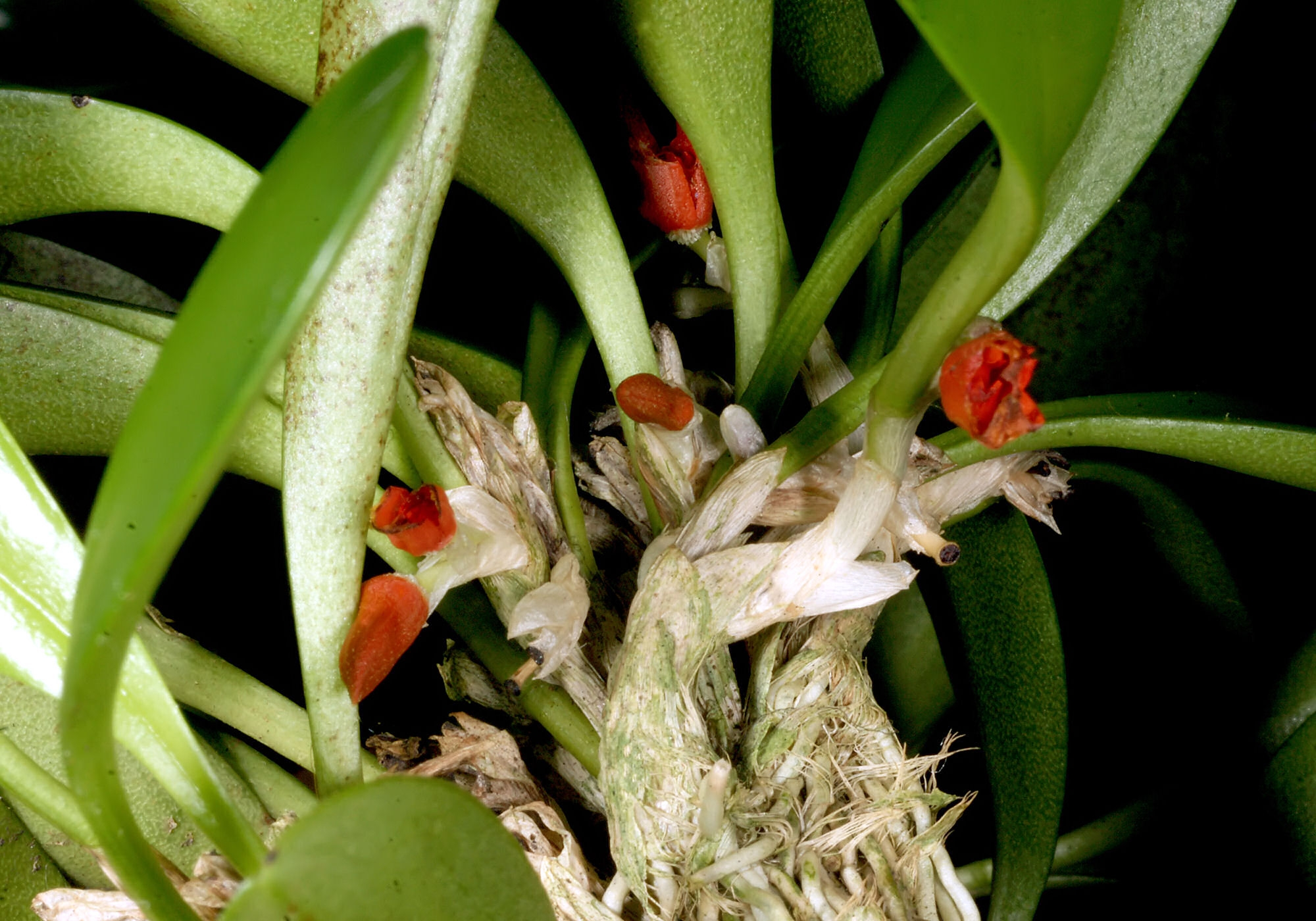

Scientific classification
- Kingdom: Plantae
- Clade: Tracheophytes
- Clade: Angiosperms
- Clade: Monocots
- Order: Asparagales
- Family: Orchidaceae
- Subfamily: Epidendroideae
- Genus: Specklinia
- Species: S. tribuloides

Binomial name
- Specklinia tribuloides (Sw.) Pridgeon & M.W.Chase

Synonyms
- Pleurothallis tribuloides (Sw.) Lindl.

= Specklinia tribuloides =

Species of orchid

Specklinia tribuloides is a species of orchid plant native to Central America.
