= Specklinia schaferi =

Scientific classification
- Kingdom: Plantae
- Clade: Tracheophytes
- Clade: Angiosperms
- Clade: Monocots
- Order: Asparagales
- Family: Orchidaceae
- Subfamily: Epidendroideae
- Genus: Specklinia
- Species: S. schaferi

Binomial name
- Specklinia schaferi (Ames) Luer

Synonyms
- Pleurothallis bipapularis Dod

Species of orchid

Specklinia schaferi is a species of orchid plant native to the Dominican Republic, Haiti, and Cuba.
