= Specklinia striata =

Scientific classification
- Kingdom: Plantae
- Clade: Tracheophytes
- Clade: Angiosperms
- Clade: Monocots
- Order: Asparagales
- Family: Orchidaceae
- Subfamily: Epidendroideae
- Genus: Specklinia
- Species: S. striata

Binomial name
- Specklinia striata (H.Focke) Luer

Synonyms
- Pleurothallis striata H.Focke

Species of plant

Specklinia striata is a species of orchid plant native to Colombia, Ecuador, French Guiana, Guyana, Panama, Suriname.
