= Nectandra krugii =

Conservation status
- Near Threatened (IUCN 3.1)

Scientific classification
- Kingdom: Plantae
- Clade: Tracheophytes
- Clade: Angiosperms
- Clade: Magnoliids
- Order: Laurales
- Family: Lauraceae
- Genus: Nectandra
- Species: N. krugii

Binomial name
- Nectandra krugii Mez

Synonyms
- Ocotea krugii (Mez) R.A.Howard

Species of flowering plant

Nectandra krugii, Krug's sweetwood, is a species of flowering plant in the family Lauraceae. It is a tree native to Antigua and Barbuda, Dominica, the Dominican Republic, Guadeloupe, Martinique, Puerto Rico, and Sint Eustatius.
