= Wercklea ferox =

- Wercklea ferox flower

Conservation status
- Least Concern (IUCN 3.1)

Scientific classification
- Kingdom: Plantae
- Clade: Tracheophytes
- Clade: Angiosperms
- Clade: Eudicots
- Clade: Rosids
- Order: Malvales
- Family: Malvaceae
- Genus: Wercklea
- Species: W. ferox

Binomial name
- Wercklea ferox (Hook.) Fryxell
- It is native to Colombia, Costa Rica, Ecuador, Panama, and Peru

Synonyms
- Hibiscus ferox Hook.; Hibiscus ferox var. genuinus Hochr.; Hibiscus ferox var. metensis Triana & Planch.; Hibiscus trichromathus R.E.Fr.

Species of flowering plant in the family Malvaceae

Wercklea ferox is a species of plant in the family Malvaceae native to Colombia, Costa Rica, Ecuador, Panama, and Peru.

== Description ==
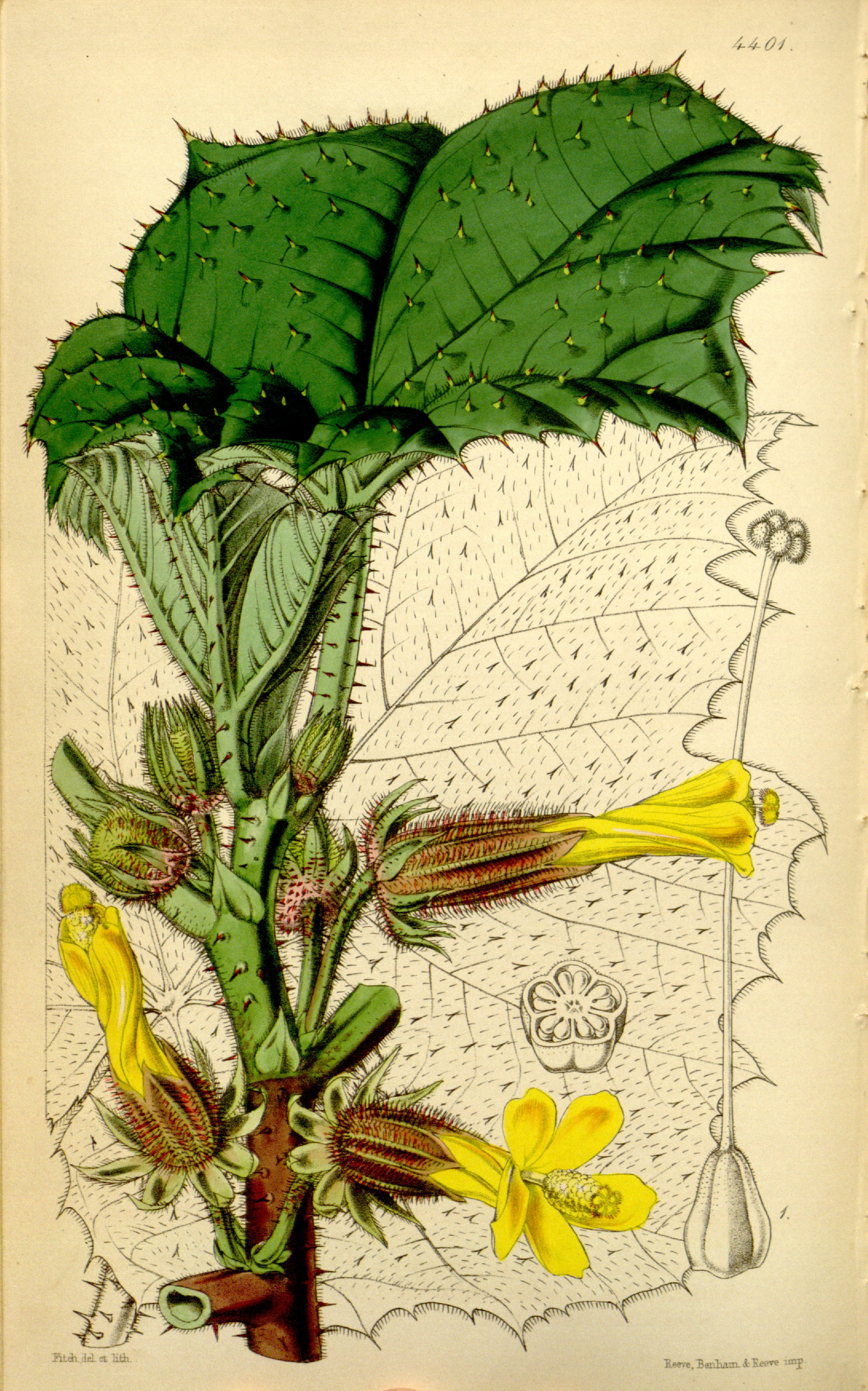
Botanical illustration of Wercklea ferox

Prickly foliage of Wercklea ferox

=== Vegetative characteristics ===
Wercklea ferox is a 0.5–5 m tall, robust herb, shrub, or tree with coarsely to finely stellate-pubescent stems with conical, woody, yellow prickles. Both the adaxial and the abaxial leaf surface is densely pubescent. The petiole is red.

=== Generative characteristics ===
The fasciculate inflorescence bears ornithophilous flowers. The calyx is red and the corolla is yellow.

== Taxonomy ==
It was first described as Hibiscus ferox Hook. by William Jackson Hooker in 1848. It was moved to the genus Wercklea Pittier & Standl. as Wercklea ferox (Hooker) Fryxell by Paul Arnold Fryxell in 1982.

=== Etymology ===
The specific epithet ferox means ferocious, fierce, or wild.

== Distribution and habitat ==
It is native to Colombia, Costa Rica, Ecuador, Panama, and Peru, where it occurs in a very large area of 30000 km^{2} or more, where it grows in generally humid areas in open forests, along roadsides or rivers at altitudes of 0–2000 m above sea level.

== Ecology ==
The flowers are hummingbird pollinated. The flowers are visited by Phaethornis syrmatophorus and Phaethornis yaruqui hummingbirds.

== Conservation ==
Wercklea ferox has a large population and a very wide distribution. It is a species of least concern.

== Uses ==
It is cultivated as an ornamental plant, but it is rare in cultivation. Wercklea ferox can be used for its jute like fibres. The strong, flexible fibres are more durable than jute.
