= Nectandra ramonensis =

Conservation status
- Near Threatened (IUCN 3.1)

Scientific classification
- Kingdom: Plantae
- Clade: Tracheophytes
- Clade: Angiosperms
- Clade: Magnoliids
- Order: Laurales
- Family: Lauraceae
- Genus: Nectandra
- Species: N. ramonensis

Binomial name
- Nectandra ramonensis Standl.

Species of plant

Nectandra ramonensis is a species of flowering plant in the family Lauraceae. It is native to Costa Rica, El Salvador, and Panama.
