= Massif de la Hotte =

Mountain range of Haiti

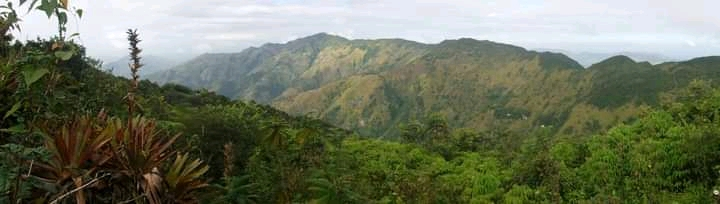
- Part of the Central Massif de la Hotte, the Tête Bœuf mountain chain seen from Bonnet Carre Haiti.

Highest point
- Peak: Pic Macaya
- Elevation
- Prominence: 2,097 m (6,880 ft)
- Coordinates: 18°22′57″N 74°01′30″W

Dimensions
- Length: 200 km (120 mi)

Geography
- Location within Haiti
- Country: Haiti
- Continent: North America

The Massif de la Hotte (French pronunciation: [masif də la ɔt]) is a mountain range in southwestern Haiti, on the Tiburon Peninsula west of the Petit-Goâve-Jacmel fault. About 2.5 million years ago, Massif de la Hotte was separated from the Massif de la Selle by a deep, wide sea channel, and formed a separate island. This resulted in a hotbed of endemism in la Hotte's bird, plant, and reptile communities. The Massif de la Hotte is subdivided into the Oriental la Hotte in the East, the central la Hotte, and the Occidental la Hotte on the western tip of the Tiburon peninsula. The Occidental la Hotte is relatively remote and is one of the most biologically diverse and significant areas of all of Hispaniola. It also supports some of the last stands of Haiti's dense cloud forest on its peaks.

== Biodiversity and conservation ==
Occidental la Hotte is the highest and biologically most diverse part of Massif de la Hotte. Rising to a peak level of approximately 7700 ft (2347 m) in Pic Macaya, Haiti's second highest peak, the massif's high and fluctuating elevations support some of Hispaniola's highest levels of biological diversity and endemism.

Plants endemic to a part of the Massif de La Hotte include Alsophila confinis, Cinnamodendron angustifolium, Clavija domingensis, Dussia sanguinea, Eugenia albimarginata, Eugenia crispula, Eugenia goavensis, Eugenia miragoanae, Eugenia perriniana, Magnolia ekmanii, Miconia ayisyena, Miconia revolutifolia, Miconia tetrazygioides, Mosiera tiburona, Myrcia calophylla, Myrcia chrysophylloides, Myrcia densifolia, Myrcia neohotteana, Myrcia neoinvolucrata, Myrcia tiburoniana, Myrcianthes esnardiana, Nectandra caudatoacuminata, Pavonia hotteana, Phyllanthus abditus, Phyllanthus urbanianus, Pleurothallis atrohiata, Psidium hotteanum, Salvia paryskii, Samuelssonia verrucosa, Sapium haitiense, Tapura haitiensis, and Wercklea hottensis.

Endemic orchids include Cranichis galatea, Lepanthes furcatipetala, Lepanthes hotteana, Lepanthes magnipetala, Lepanthes pteroglossa, Lepanthes quadrispatulata, Lepanthes semperflorens, Lepanthopsis aristata, Lepanthopsis micheliae, Lepanthopsis ornipteridion, Malaxis dodii, Pleurothallis atrohiata, Specklinia formondii, Specklinia mitchellii, Specklinia stillsonii, Stelis choriantha, Stelis glacensis, Stelis magnicava, and Tomzanonia filicina.

Conservation International recognizes the region, in which 13 of Hispaniola's most critically endangered species (all amphibians) occur, as one of the most conservation-urgent in the world. Among the most critically endangered frog species are Eleutherodactylus chlorophenax and Eleutherodactylus parapelates, two frog species endemic to Haiti. The Hispaniolan trogon, Haiti's national bird, has a recognized presence in the region, as well as wintering Bicknell's thrushes.

Notable conservation areas in the Massif de la Hotte include five national parks, five habitat/species management areas, two protected areas with sustainable use of natural resources, and the largest cave on the Caribbean islands, Grotte Marie Jeanne. The national parks are: Pic Macaya National Park, Grande Colline National Park, Deux Mamelles National Park, Grand Bois National Park, and Ile a Vache National Park. The habitat/species management areas are: Grosse Caye / Zone humide d'Aquin, Olivier / Zanglais, Pointe Abacou, Fond de Cayes, and la Cahouane. The two protected areas with sustainable use of natural resources are: Jeremie - Abricot and Barcaderes Caymites.

=== La Hotte Biosphere Reserve ===
The La Hotte Biosphere Reserve was designated by UNESCO in 2016. The reserve covers an area of 435,193.5 ha (terrestrial and marine), with a core area of 117,119 ha (terrestrial 52,781.5 ha, marine 64,337.5 ha), a buffer zone of 185,027.5 ha (terrestrial 130,074.5 ha, marine: 54,953 ha), and a transition area of 133,047 ha (terrestrial 82,423 ha, marine: 50,624 ha).

== See also ==
- Geography of Haiti
- Mountain ranges of the Caribbean
- World Conservation Monitoring Centre
