= Wercklea =

- Wercklea ferox flower

Scientific classification
- Kingdom: Plantae
- Clade: Tracheophytes
- Clade: Angiosperms
- Clade: Eudicots
- Clade: Rosids
- Order: Malvales
- Family: Malvaceae
- Subfamily: Malvoideae
- Tribe: Hibisceae
- Genus: Wercklea; Pittier & Standl.

Type species
- Wercklea insignis Pittier & Standl.

Species
- See here
- It is native to the region from Costa Rica to Ecuador, and the Caribbean

Genus of plants

Wercklea is a genus of flowering plants in the family Malvaceae native to the region from Costa Rica to Ecuador, and the Caribbean.

== Description ==
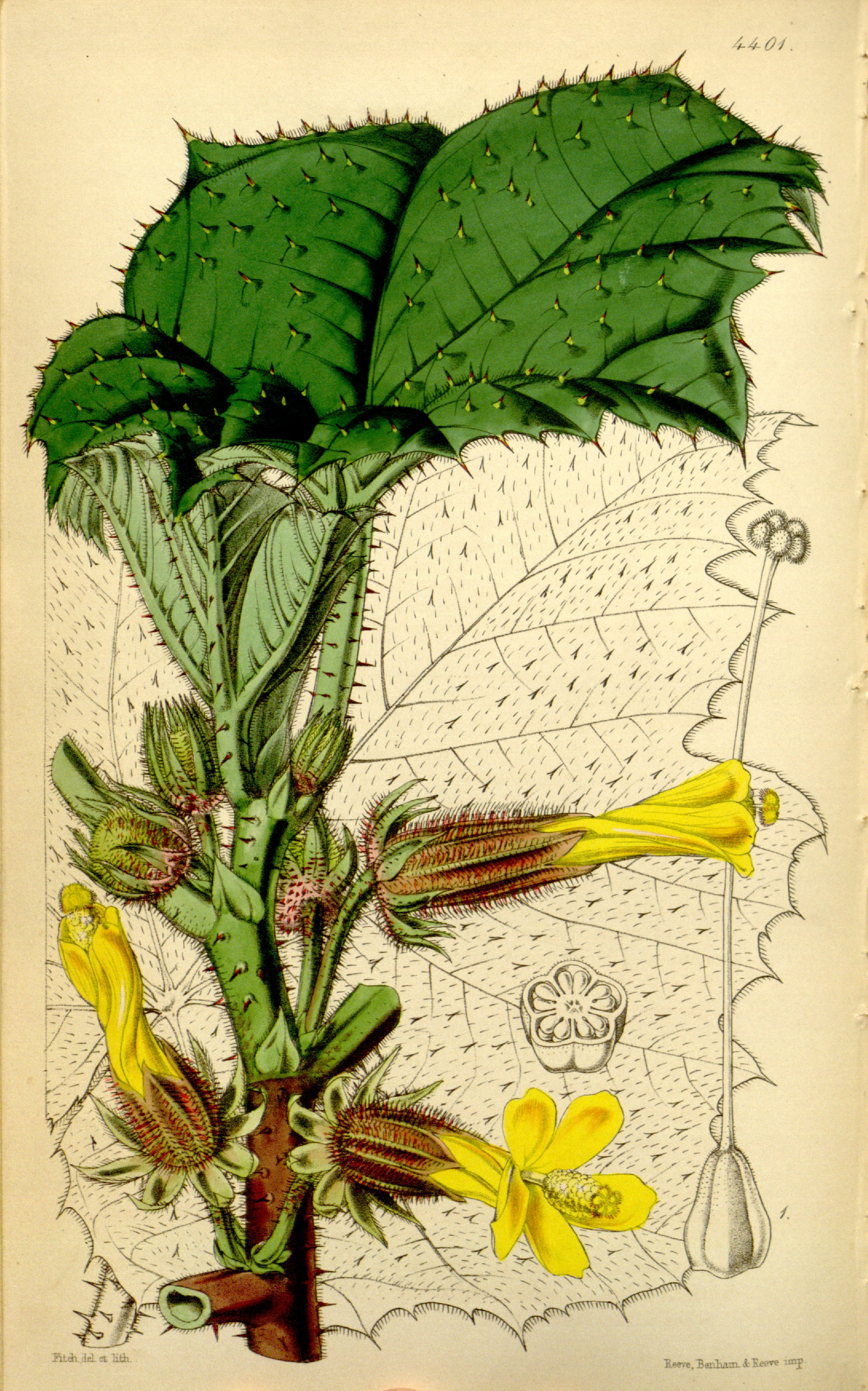
Botanical illustration of Wercklea ferox

=== Vegetative characteristics ===
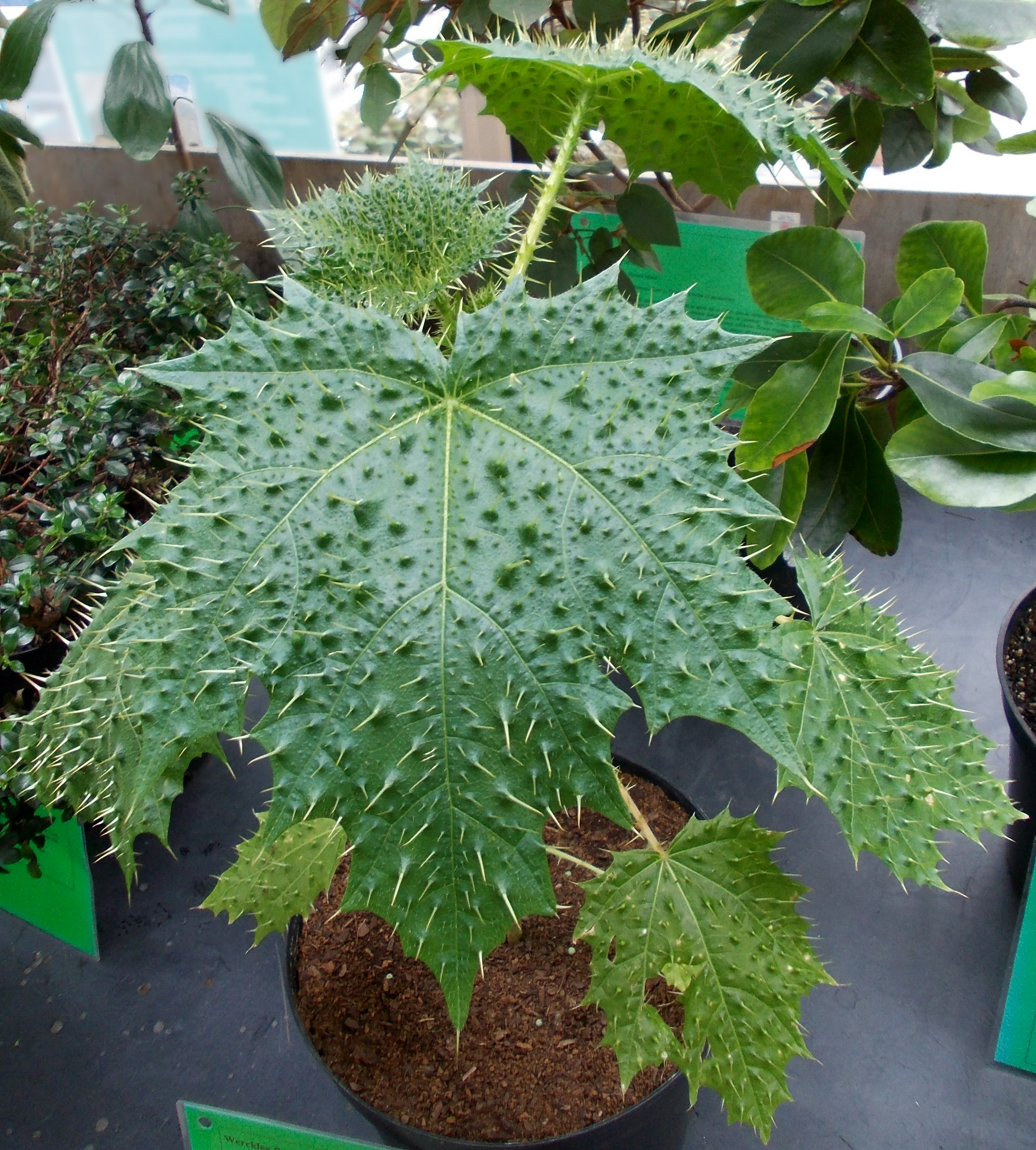
Prickly foliage of Wercklea flavovirens

Wercklea are 2–20 m tall herbs, shrubs, or trees with alternate leaves.

=== Generative characteristics ===
Wercklea insignis in flower

The 5 large, capitate stigmas are crowded. The 5-locular, oblong, obovate or fusiform fruit is densely hispid, stellate-pubescent or glabrous, often beaked and woody. It is internally pubescent or glabrous, prominently winged or unwinged, and does not open widely.

== Taxonomy ==
It was described by Henri François Pittier and Paul Carpenter Standley in 1916. The type species is Wercklea insignis Pittier & Standl.

=== Species ===
It has 13 species:

- Wercklea cocleana (A.Robyns) Fryxell
- Wercklea ferox (Hook.) Fryxell
- Wercklea flavovirens Proctor
- Wercklea grandiflora Fryxell
- Wercklea horrida (Urb.) Fryxell
- Wercklea hottensis (Helwig ex Urb.) Fryxell
- Wercklea insignis Pittier & Standl.
- Wercklea intermedia Fryxell
- Wercklea lutea Rolfe
- Wercklea magnibracteata Fryxell
- Wercklea pseudoferox (Hochr.) Fryxell
- Wercklea tulipiflora (Hook.) Fryxell
- Wercklea woodsonii (A.Robyns) Fryxell

== Distribution and habitat ==
It is native to Colombia, Costa Rica, Dominican Republic, Ecuador, Haiti, Jamaica, Leeward Islands, Panama, and the Windward Islands, where it occurs in relatively wet habitats along river banks, rainforest, and cloud forest at elevations of 0–2700 m above sea level.
