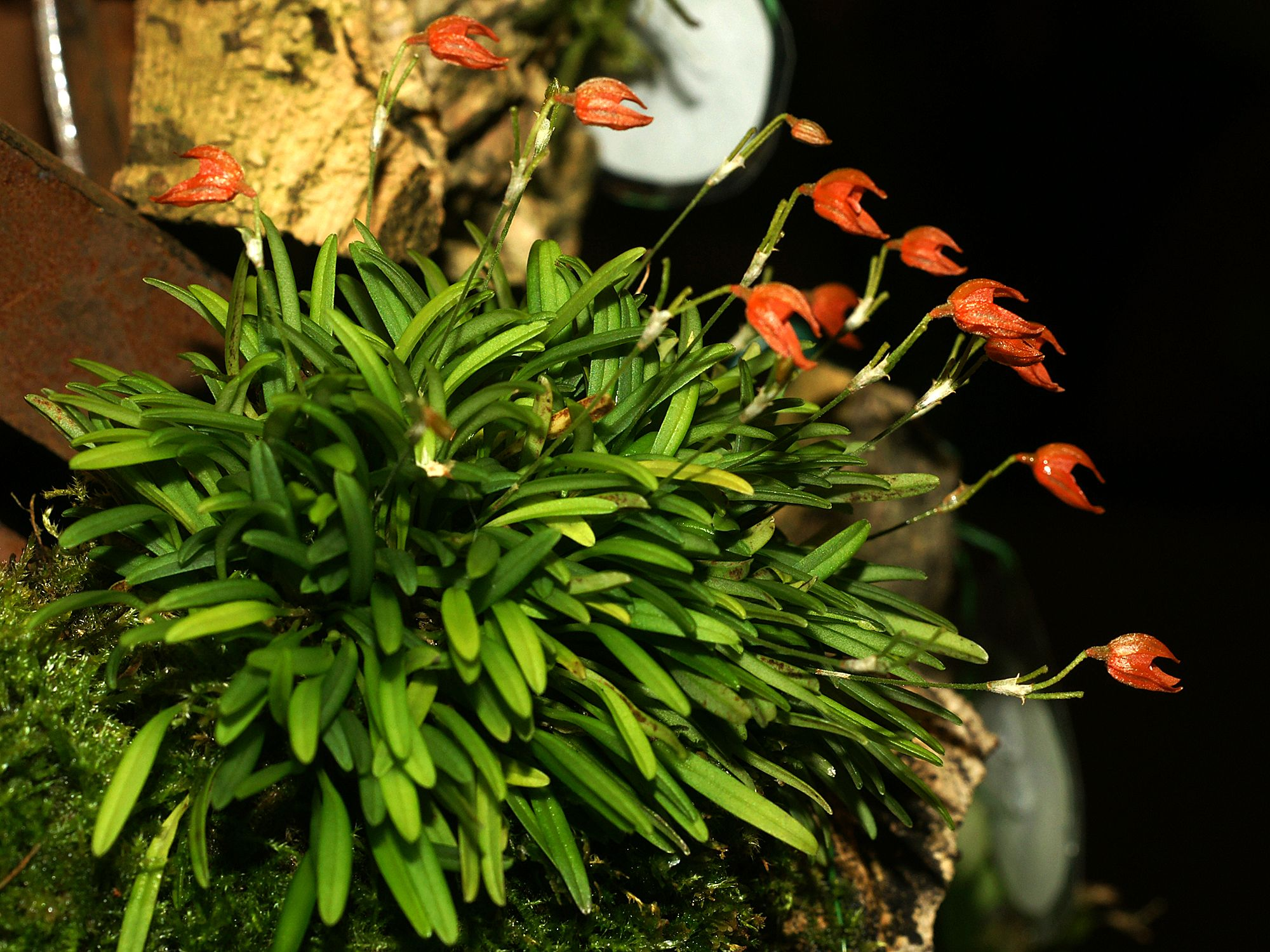
- Specklinia glandulosa

Scientific classification
- Kingdom: Plantae
- Clade: Tracheophytes
- Clade: Angiosperms
- Clade: Monocots
- Order: Asparagales
- Family: Orchidaceae
- Subfamily: Epidendroideae
- Tribe: Epidendreae
- Subtribe: Pleurothallidinae
- Genus: Specklinia; Lindl.

Synonyms
- Acostaea Schltr.; Pseudoctomeria Kraenzl.; Verapazia Archila; Empusella (Luer) Luer; Tribulago Luer; Muscarella Luer; Sarcinula Luer; Sylphi Luer

= Specklinia =

Genus of orchids

Specklinia is a genus of orchids native to South America, Central America, and the Caribbean. It contains approximately 100 species.

== Species ==
As of 2025, Kew's Plants of the World Online lists 109 accepted species of Specklinia.

- Specklinia absurda
- Specklinia acanthodes
- Specklinia acicularis
- Specklinia acoana
- Specklinia acrisepala
- Specklinia acutiflora
- Specklinia alajuelensis
- Specklinia alexii
- Specklinia alta
- Specklinia areldii
- Specklinia barbae
- Specklinia barbosana
- Specklinia berolinensis
- Specklinia bicornis
- Specklinia blancoi
- Specklinia brighamella
- Specklinia brighamii
- Specklinia cactantha
- Specklinia calderae
- Specklinia calyptrostele
- Specklinia campylotyle
- Specklinia caulophryne
- Specklinia chontalensis
- Specklinia ciliifera
- Specklinia colombiana
- Specklinia condylata
- Specklinia corniculata
- Specklinia coronula
- Specklinia costaricensis
- Specklinia cucumeris
- Specklinia curtisii
- Specklinia cycesis
- Specklinia daviesii
- Specklinia digitale
- Specklinia displosa
- Specklinia dodii
- Specklinia dressleri
- Specklinia dunstervillei
- Specklinia endotrachys
- Specklinia erecta
- Specklinia exilis
- Specklinia feuilletii
- Specklinia flosculifera
- Specklinia formondii
- Specklinia fuegi
- Specklinia fulgens
- Specklinia gersonii
- Specklinia glandulosa
- Specklinia gracillima
- Specklinia grisebachiana
- Specklinia grobyi
- Specklinia guanacastensis
- Specklinia hymenantha
- Specklinia icterina
- Specklinia jesupii
- Specklinia juddii
- Specklinia lanceola
- Specklinia lentiginosa
- Specklinia leptantha
- Specklinia lichenicola
- Specklinia lugduno-batavae
- Specklinia luis-diegoi
- Specklinia macayensis
- Specklinia marginalis
- Specklinia mazei
- Specklinia microphylla
- Specklinia minuta
- Specklinia mitchellii
- Specklinia montezumae
- Specklinia morganii
- Specklinia mornicola
- Specklinia pectinifera
- Specklinia pereziana
- Specklinia pertenuis
- Specklinia pfavii
- Specklinia picta
- Specklinia pisinna
- Specklinia producta
- Specklinia psichion
- Specklinia purpurella
- Specklinia recula
- Specklinia remotiflora
- Specklinia rinkei
- Specklinia rubidantha
- Specklinia schaferi
- Specklinia scolopax
- Specklinia simmleriana
- Specklinia spectabilis
- Specklinia spiloporphyrea
- Specklinia stillsonii
- Specklinia striata
- Specklinia subpicta
- Specklinia succulenta
- Specklinia tenax
- Specklinia tribuloides
- Specklinia trichyphis
- Specklinia trilobata
- Specklinia turrialbae
- Specklinia unicornis
- Specklinia unistriata
- Specklinia vierlingii
- Specklinia viridiflora
- Specklinia vittariifolia
- Specklinia wrightii
- Specklinia yucatanensis
