= Protected areas of the Caribbean =

Protected areas of the Caribbean are significant in a region of particular ecological vulnerability, including the impact of climate change and the impact of tourism.

The University of the West Indies' "Caribbean Protected Areas Gateway" supports informational resources for the 16 Caribbean member states of the Organisation of African, Caribbean and Pacific States. It forms the regional component of the ACP's Biodiversity and Protected Areas Management program, building on the World Database on Protected Areas.

The United Nations Environment Programme supports the Greater Caribbean through its Regional Seas initiative, but studies have pointed to the shortage of marine protected areas and marine reserves in the region as particularly detrimental to shark conservation, an issue also addressed globally though the Memorandum of Understanding on the Conservation of Migratory Sharks. Comparative county-by-county studies on MPA enforcement have also been made by the Environmental Law Institute.

== National trusts in the Caribbean ==
See National trust

B:

- Bahamas National Trust
- Barbados National Trust
- Bermuda National Trust
- Belize: List of protected areas of Belize

C:

- National Trust for the Cayman Islands

D:

- Dominica: List of national parks of Dominica
- Dominican Republic: Category:Protected areas of the Dominican Republic

G:

- Grenada National Trust
- National Trust of Guyana

H:

- Haiti National Trust
- Haiti: List of protected areas of Haiti

M:

- Montserrat National Trust

P:

- National Register of Historic Places listings in Puerto Rico

S:

- Saint Lucia National Trust

T:

- National Trust of Trinidad and Tobago
