= List of protected areas of Haiti =

Haiti has 27 protected areas, which cover 8.61% of Haiti's land area and inland waters, and 1.47% of Haiti's marine and coastal area.

== Natural national parks ==
- Etang de Miragone Natural National Park
- Fort Royal Natural National Park
- Lac Azueï Natural National Park
- Source Royer Natural National Park
- Trois Etangs Natural National Park
- Soucailles Natural National Park
- Source Zabeth Natural National Park

== Exceptional natural elements ==
- Grotte Marie Jeanne Exceptional Natural Element

== Marine protected areas ==
Marine protected areas in Haiti are largely created through the efforts of the Foundation for the Protection of Marine Biodiversity (FoProBiM) and Reef Check Haiti to help protect Haiti's coastal and marine ecosystems. In August 2013, the Port Salut/Aquin Protected Area (Aire Protégée de Ressources Naturelles Gérées de Port Salut/Aquin), was created in Southwestern Haiti. Three Bays Protected Area (Aire Protégée de Ressources Naturelles Gérées des Trois Baies), located in northeastern Haiti, was created in December 2013.

=== Managed natural resources protected areas ===
Haiti has three marine/coastal managed natural resources protected areas:

- Baradéres-Cayemites Managed Natural Resources Protected Area
- Jérémie-Abricots Managed Natural Resources Protected Area
- Port Salut-Aquin Managed Natural Resources Protected Area

=== Other marine protected areas ===
Current list of marine protected areas in Haiti:

- Abacou
- Complexe Cap-Camp Louise
- Cote Belle Anse et Grand Gosier
- Dame Marie
- La Cahouane
- La Navase
- Parc Marin de la Baie de l’Acul Marine Park
- Parc Marin des Arcadins Marine Park
- Parc Marin des Rochelois Marine Park
- Aire Protégée de Ressources Naturelles Gérées des Trois Baies (Three Bays Protected Area)
- Parc Marin Gonaïves/Grande Saline Marine Park
- Parc Marin Île-à-Vaches/Aquin Marine Park
- Parc Marin la Gonâve-Nord Marine Park
- Parc Marin la Gonâve-Sud Marine Park
- Petit Paradis
- Presqu'ile du Môle-Saint-Nicolas

== See also ==
- List of World Heritage Sites in Haiti
- Environmental issues in Haiti
- Haiti National Trust
- Société Audubon Haïti
