= Cartagena Convention =

The Cartagena Convention is a short name that may refer to one of two international agreements signed in Cartagena de Indias, Colombia:

- The Convention for the Protection and Development of the Marine Environment of the Wider Caribbean Region, adopted 24 March 1983
- The Convention Establishing the Association of Caribbean States, adopted 24 July 1994
