= List of national parks of Haiti =

National Parks of Haiti are places of natural or historical value designated for protection and sustainable utilization.

La Visite National Park and Pic Macaya National Park were the first two national parks to be established in Haiti, both in 1983. They were created largely through the efforts of Charles A. Woods and colleagues. Grande Colline National Park was established on July 23, 2014, and Grand Bois National Park and Deux Mamelles National Park were established on September 23, 2015. Those three recent parks were created largely through the efforts of S. Blair Hedges and Philippe Bayard.

Haiti currently has 15 national parks, not including other protected areas:

- La Visite National Park
- Pic Macaya National Park
- Grande Colline National Park
- Grand Bois National Park
- Deux Mamelles National Park
- National History Park – Citadelle, Sans-Souci Palace
- Martissant Urban National Park
- Pélerin National Park
- Canapé-Vert National Park
- Lagon des Huîtres National Park
- Sant d'Eau National Park
- Forêt des Pins 1 National Park
- Forêt des Pins 2 National Park
- Three Bays National Park
- Île-à-Vache National Park
- Les Matheux National History Park
- Zone Reservée Péligre National Park
