= Grande Colline National Park =

National park in Haiti

- IUCN category II (national park)
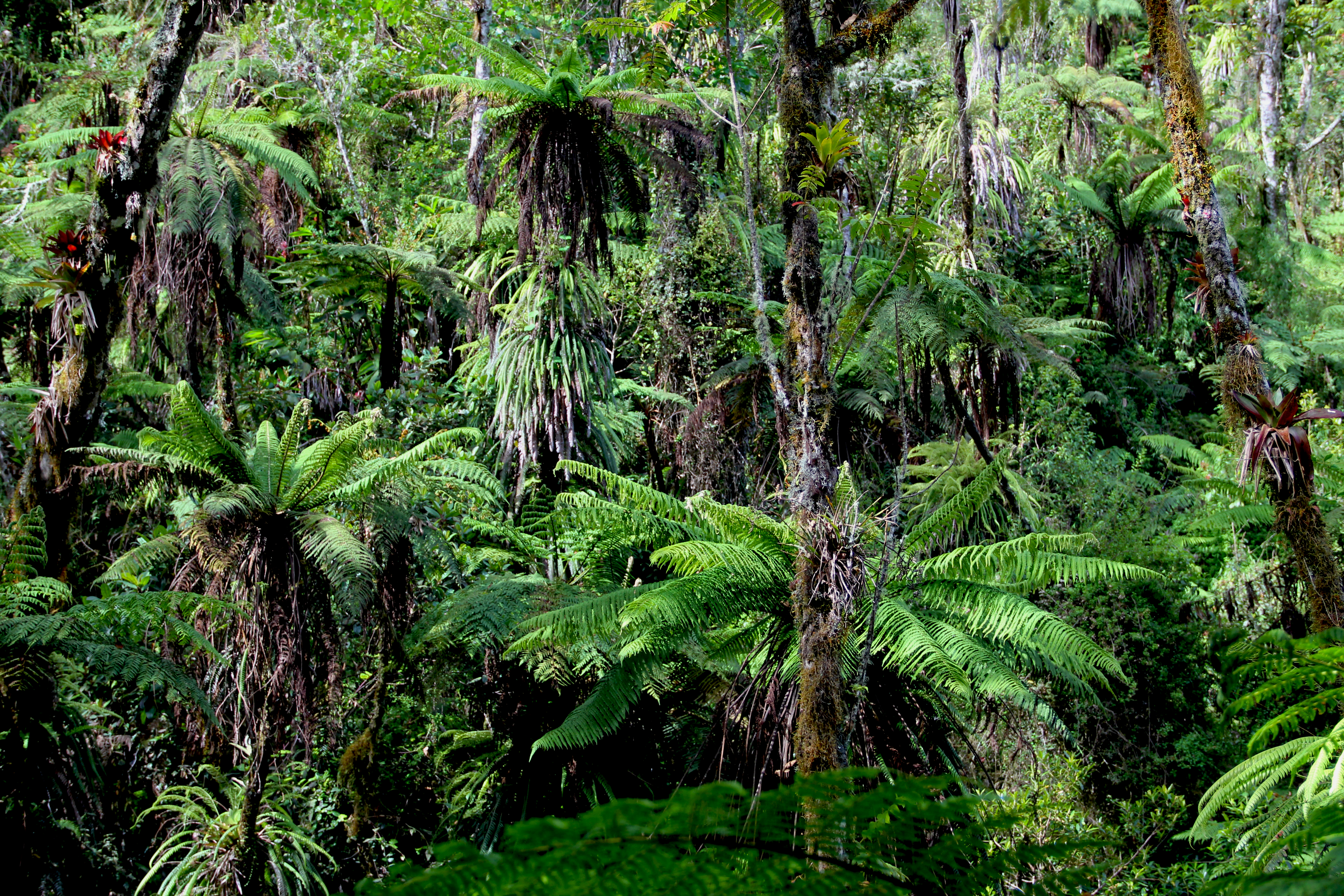
- Forest with giant tree ferns in Grande Colline

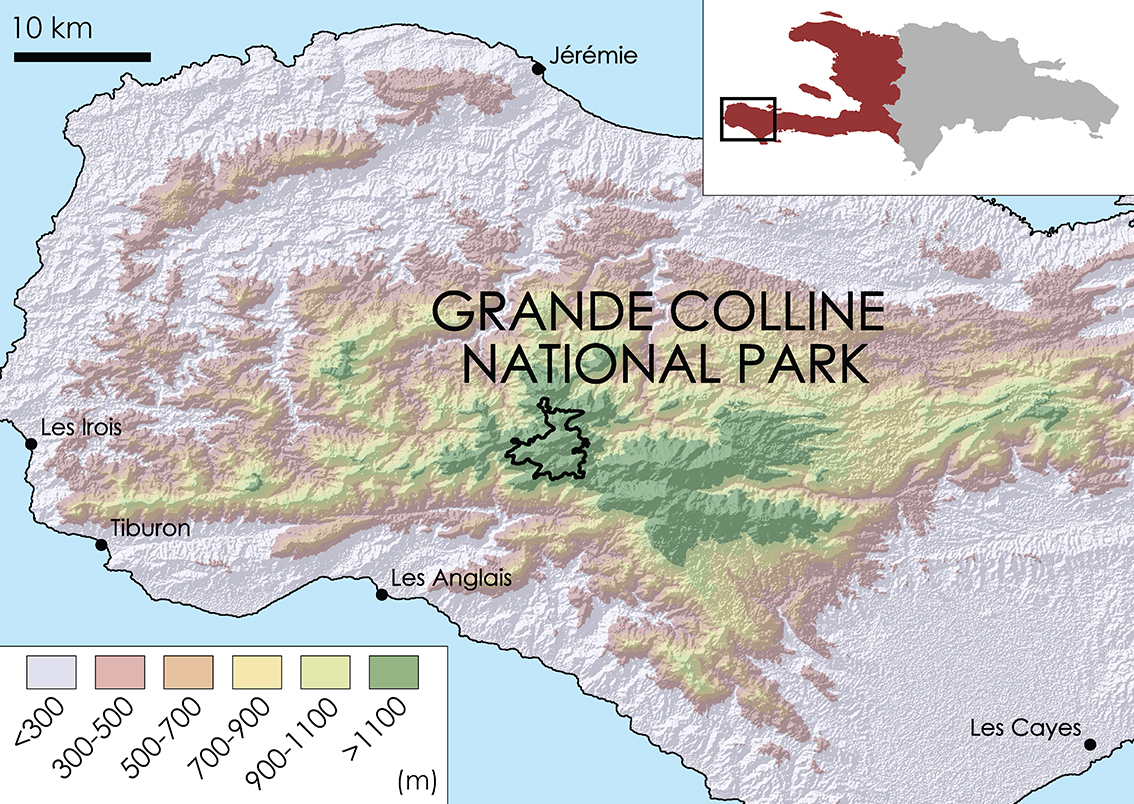
- Grande Colline National Park boundaries on a topographic map of Haiti
- Location: Tiburon Peninsula
- Coordinates: 18°24′15″N 74°06′10″W
- Area: 1,510 ha (5.8 sq mi)
- Established: 23 July 2014

Grande Colline National Park (French: Parc National Naturel de Grande Colline) is a national park at the western end of Haiti's Tiburon Peninsula. The park was established on 23 July 2014 with an area of 1,510 hectares, centred around five peaks within the Grande Colline mountain range. It is one of the most remote areas of Haiti, and is regarded as a biodiversity hotspot due to the number of endemic species which have been identified in the area.

== Geography ==
The Grande Colline range sits at the core of the Occidental Massif de la Hotte, to the west of Pic Macaya, Haiti's second highest peak. There are five named peaks within the park:

- Morne Desbarrières (1,843 m (6,047 ft))
- Morne Grande Colline (2,025 m (6,644 ft))
- Morne Petite Colline (1,860 m (6,100 ft))
- Morne Grenouille (2,006 m (6,581 ft))
- Morne Lézard (1,854 m (6,083 ft))

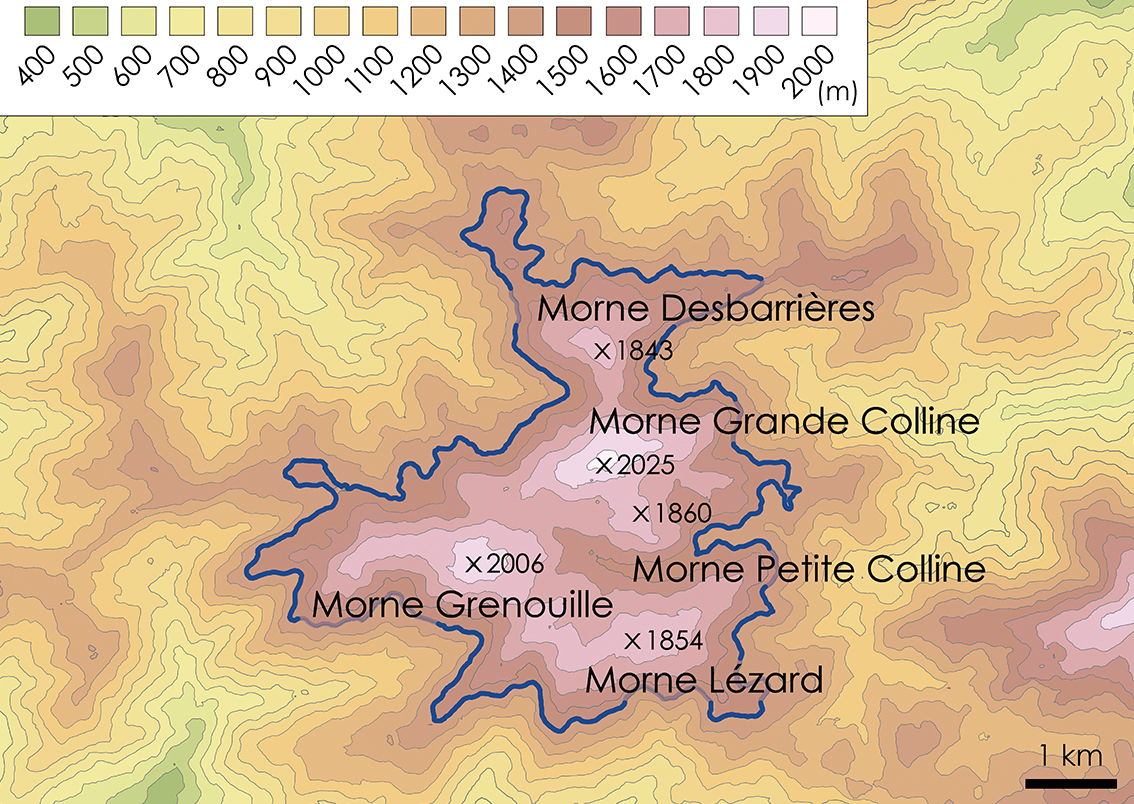
Detailed topographic map of Grande Colline National Park and its peaks

This park is one of the most remote and difficult to reach areas in Haiti. It was explored by the founders of the Haiti National Trust in 2011–2015, with assistance of a helicopter and supported by the National Science Foundation and Critical Ecosystem Partnership Fund.

== Ecology ==
The new species discovered and resulting information on the ecosystem and threats led to the creation of the national park in 2014. Isolated stands of original forest containing giant tree ferns and hardwoods remain at elevations above 1800 meters, but deforestation continues in the park, for building materials, agriculture, and charcoal production.

== See also ==
- List of national parks of Haiti
- Haiti National Trust
