= Deux Mamelles National Park =

National Park in Haiti

Coordinates: 18°26′45″N 74°14′40″W

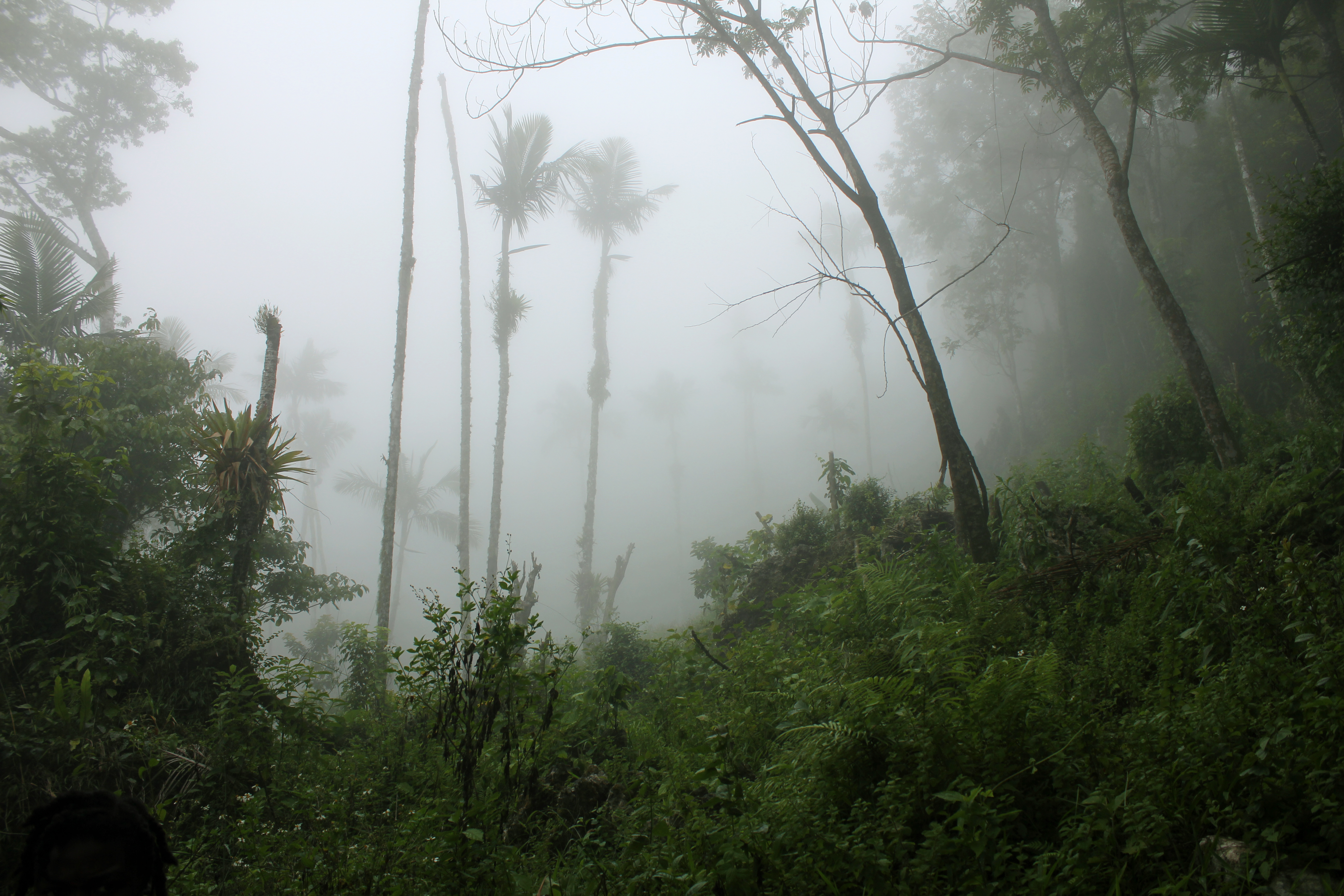
Cloud forest in Deux Mamelles National Park

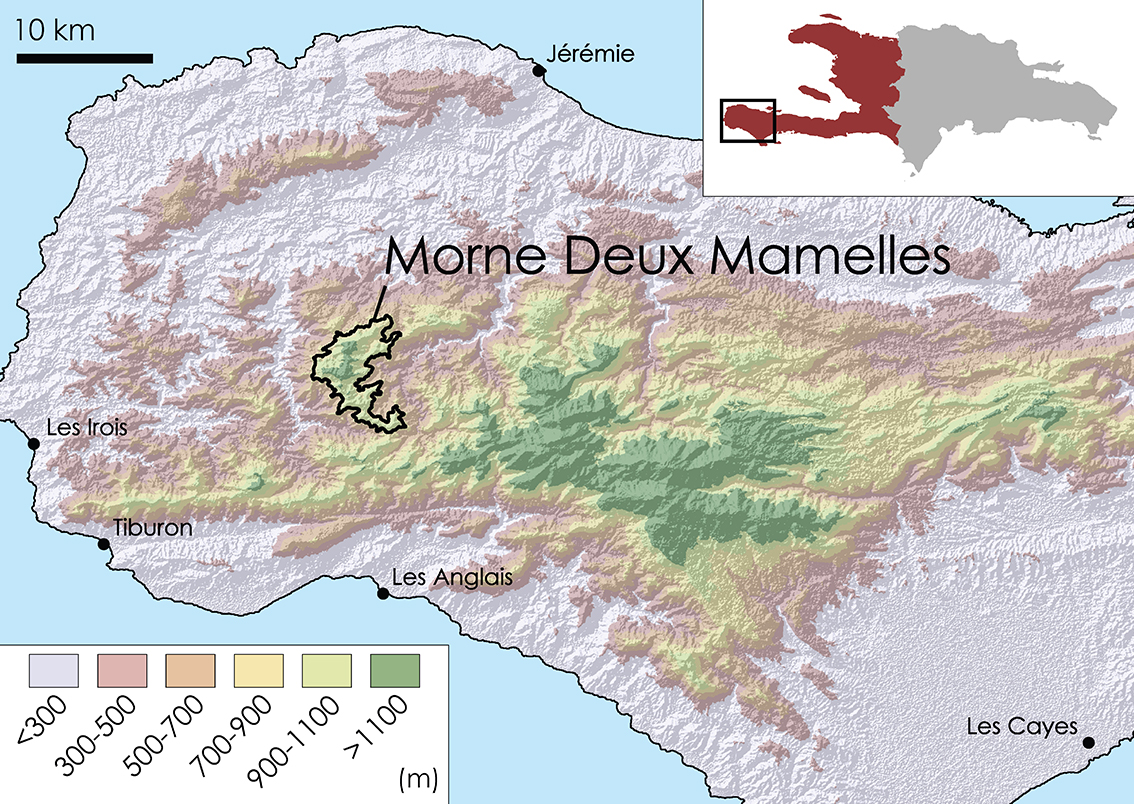
Deux Mamelles National Park boundaries on a topographic map of Haiti

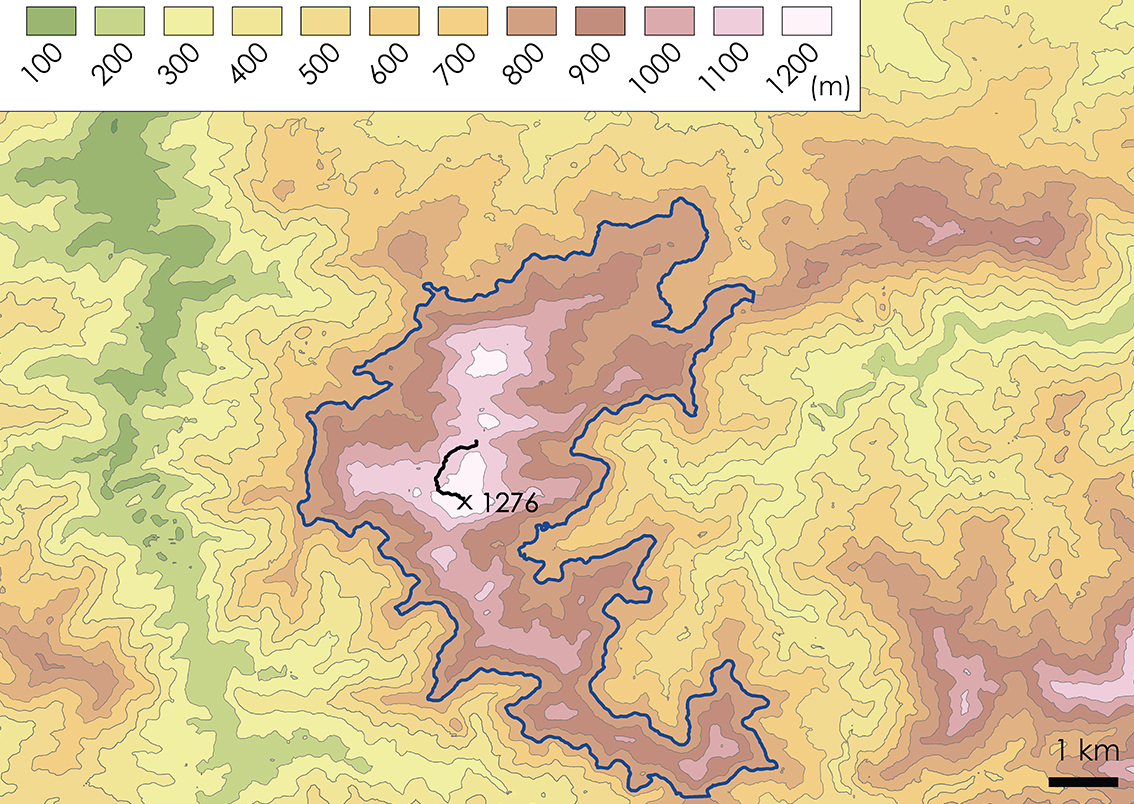
Detailed topographic map of Deux Mamelles National Park, showing highest point (marked “X”) and trail explored in 2011

Deux Mamelles National Park (French: Parc National Naturel de Deux Mamelles) is a national park in Haiti established on September 23, 2015 with an area of 2,265 hectares (5,600 acres). It is located on the Tiburon Peninsula of Haiti, just west of a line connecting Les Anglais to the south and Jérémie to the north. The park circumscribes a U-shaped mountain, Morne Deux Mamelles, reaching 1,276 meters (4,186 ft) in elevation and is the highest mountain at the western end of the Tiburon Peninsula. Patches of the original (primary) forest remain at elevations above 1,000 meters (3,300 ft), growing on highly dissected limestone rock.

The park is not accessible by road, making it difficult to access. In 2011, founders of the Haiti National Trust made a visit by helicopter to explore the area and collect data on the rich biodiversity. The results of that work led to its establishment as a national park.

== See also ==
- Haiti National Trust
- List of national parks of Haiti
