= Convention for the Protection and Development of the Marine Environment of the Wider Caribbean Region =

International agreement adopted in 1983

Cartagena Convention
Convention for the Protection and Development of the Marine Environment of the Wider Caribbean Region
- Signed: 24 March 1983
- Location: Cartagena, Colombia
- Effective: 11 October 1986
- Condition: Effective 30 days after ninth ratification
- Parties: 26
- Depositary: Government of the Republic of Colombia
- Languages: English, Spanish and French

The Convention for the Protection and Development of the Marine Environment of the Wider Caribbean Region, commonly called the Cartagena Convention, is an international agreement for the protection of the Caribbean Sea, the Gulf of Mexico and a portion of the adjacent Atlantic Ocean. It was adopted on 24 March 1983, entered into force on 11 October 1986 subsequent to its ratification by Antigua and Barbuda, the ninth party to do so, and has been ratified by 26 states. It has been amended by three major protocols: the Protocol Concerning Co-operation in Combating Oil Spills in the Wider Caribbean Region (Oil Spills Protocol), the Protocol Concerning Specially Protected Areas and Wildlife to the Convention for the Protection and Development of the Marine Environment of the Wider Caribbean Region (SPAW Protocol) and the Protocol Concerning Pollution from Land-Based Sources and Activities to the Convention for the Protection and Development of the Marine Environment of the Wider Caribbean Region (LBS Protocol).

== History ==
The United Nations Environment Programme established the Regional Seas Programme in 1974, which works to promote the development of conventions and action plans for protection of 18 designated regional seas, of which the Wider Caribbean is one. The Wider Caribbean Region encompasses the Gulf of Mexico, the Caribbean Sea, the Straits of Florida out to 200 nautical miles from shore and the states and territories whose coastlines abut them. The Cartagena Convention defines the Atlantic boundaries of its convention area as lying south of 30 degrees north latitude and within 200 nautical miles of the Atlantic coasts of participating states.

In 1977, the Economic Commission for Latin America and the UNEP collaborated to start preparations for the creation of a regional action plan and establishment of the Caribbean Environment Programme (CEP) for the protection and development of the Wider Caribbean. The Action Plan for the CEP was adopted at a meeting of representatives from 22 regional governments in Montego Bay, Jamaica in 1981, following preparatory meetings of government-nominated experts in Caracas, Venezuela, and Managua, Nicaragua.

An impetus for the subsequent creation of the Cartagena Convention was the major oil spill that occurred after two very large crude carriers, tankers SS Atlantic Empress and Aegean Captain collided off Trinidad and Tobago in July 1979. Between the collision itself and the subsequent breakup of the Atlantic Empress near Barbados two weeks later while under tow, it was the largest tanker spill ever, with loss of approximately 286,000 metric tons of oil to the marine environment. One month prior to the collision, the Ixtoc I oil spill began in the Bay of Campeche, which, after the 10 months required to stop the leakage from the blown-out oil well, became the largest oil spill to that point (476,190 metric tons). Approximately 250 spills, incidents that result in the release of greater than 0.17 metric tons of oil, occur annually in the oil-producing Gulf of Mexico and Caribbean Sea according to estimates published in 2007. Even regular ship traffic, such as the cargo vessels passing to and from the Caribbean Sea through the Panama Canal or cruise ships plying routes to islands, can contribute to oil pollution through collisions and discharge of contaminated bilge water that has not been properly separated.

The Cartagena Convention was the product of the first Conference of Plenipotentiaries on the Protection and Development of the Marine Environment of the Wider Caribbean Region, held in Cartagena, Colombia, between 21 and 24 March 1983. The Convention and its first protocol, the Oil Spills protocol, were concurrently adopted on 24 March 1983 in English, French and Spanish, which are regarded as equally authoritative texts. Subsequent plenipotentiary conferences in 1990, in Kingston, Jamaica, and in 1999, in Oranjestad, Aruba, led to the adoptions of the SPAW Protocol and the LBS Protocol, respectively. Members of the original convention and Oil Spills Protocol can separately ratify the latter two protocols. As of 2021, 18 members have ratified the SPAW Protocol, which entered into force in 2000, and 15 have ratified the LBS Protocol, which entered into force in 2010.

== Provisions ==
The Cartagena Convention defines ship-based, land-based, seabed activity–derived and airborne pollution sources that can affect the convention area and are regulated by the convention.

It stipulates that participants who become aware of a pollution emergency should take measures to stem the pollution and notify other states who have the potential to be impacted, as well as international bodies. It calls for international cooperation between participating states in proactively developing pollution event contingency plans and in conducting research and monitoring.

Participating states are also encouraged to define specially protected areas where there are rare or threatened ecosystems or habitat for threatened species. They should conduct environmental impact assessments before undertaking major development projects in coastal areas for effects on marine ecosystems in the convention area.

The participants typically meet once every two years. Extraordinary meetings may occur if a request for one is supported by a majority of signatories.

Mechanisms for resolving disputes between parties on issues arising in the course of interpretating and implementing the Cartagena Convention are set forth in Article 23 and in an annex to the text. Parties can denounce the Convention or any of its protocols they have ratified two years after the Convention or the specific protocol has gone into effect for them, but if they are no longer contracted to any protocol after their denunciation, they will also be considered to have denounced the Cartagena Convention as a whole.

=== Oil Spills Protocol ===
The Oil Spills Protocol provides details on the implementation of Cartagena Convention provisions with respect to hazardous material releases, including making an inventory of emergency response equipment and expertise related to oil spills. Oil spills are defined by the protocol as an actual or threatened release requiring emergency action to protect health, natural resources, maritime activities (e.g. port operations) and/or historic sites or tourism appeal. A provision for an annex to the protocol extending the definition of hazardous materials to include substances other than oil is included, and until an annex is created, the protocol can be provisionally applied to non-oil hazardous substances.

=== SPAW Protocol ===
The Specially Protected Areas and Wildlife Protocol encourages parties to establish protected areas that conserve ecosystems, natural resources, habitats of endangered, threatened or endemic species and areas of historic, cultural or certain other forms of value. It also provides for the creation of buffer zones, areas of more limited protection, around the protected areas. Three annexes to the protocol establish lists of endangered and threatened wildlife: Annex I lists endangered and threatened flora, Annex II lists endangered and threatened fauna and Annex III contains flora and fauna that are in need of protection, but that could be able to be utilized on a "rational and sustainable basis" with conservation measures.

In addition to inhabitants of the marine environment, the SPAW Protocol can be applied to selected fauna and flora and ecosystems of coasts and coastal watersheds above the freshwater transition point at the discretion of the party with jurisdiction. The annexes are developed and updated in consultation with an advisory committee and are subject to approval of the parties. Exemptions to strict protections may be provided to support traditional activities of local populations if they do not pose substantial risk to the survival or ecological function of protected species or areas. Guidance is made to limit the introduction of non-indigenous or genetically modified organisms.

=== LBS Protocol ===
The Land-Based Sources and Activities Protocol calls for parties to take action and cooperate to reduce land-based pollution from their territories. It defines ten priority point source categories in its Annex I for targeted mitigation, including from the sugar and mining industries, domestic sewage and from intensive animal farming operations, and lists pollutants of concern. Annex II specifies considerations for source control and management and lists alternative production practices that minimize waste generation.

In Annex III, the protocol regulates domestic wastewater discharges in the convention area, including effluent containing grey water. This annex defines Class I waters as being especially sensitive to the effects of domestic wastewater exposure due to biological or ecological characteristics or their use by humans, e.g. for recreation. Class II waters, which are those considered less sensitive to pollution from domestic wastewater, have defined thresholds for total suspended solids, biological oxygen demand, pH and fats, oils and grease in effluent that are less stringent than those for discharges into Class I waters. In neither case should discharges contain visible floatables. It is recommended to parties that treatment plants and effluent outflow points are designed to minimize or entirely avoid effects on Class I waters. Parties are asked to control the amount of nitrogen and phosphorus that they release into the convention area from domestic sewage, and to avoid discharge of toxic chlorine from water treatment systems.

Annex IV addresses agricultural non-point source pollution, including provisions for reduction of nitrogen and phosphorus pollution in runoff, as well as pesticides, sediment, solid waste and pathogens causing waterborne diseases.

== Membership ==
As of 2023, the United Kingdom, a party to the convention, has not extended treaty membership to Anguilla or Bermuda, both UK overseas territories.

== Implementation ==
Four Regional Activity Centres (RACs) have been established to help implement the Cartagena Convention and protocols, here listed with the protocol implemented and RAC location in parentheses: the Regional Marine Pollution Emergency Information and Training Center for the Wider Caribbean (Oil Spills Protocol, Curaçao), The RAC for Specially Protected Areas and Wildlife (SPAW Protocol, Guadeloupe), The Centre of Engineering and Environmental Management of Coasts and Bays (LBS Protocol, Cuba) and The Institute of Marine Affairs (LBS Protocol, Trinidad and Tobago). The Regional Coordinating Unit and Secretariat for the convention are located in Kingston, Jamaica. The Cartagena Convention is administered by the United Nations Environment Programme.

The 1981 Action Plan for the Caribbean Environment Programme (CEP) provided for establishment of a trust fund financing costs of implementing the Action Plan in the Caribbean, which opened in September 1983 after fulfilling promised contributions from various countries. Nevertheless, the CEP cited lack of contributions to the trust fund as an obstacle it faced in 2014, along with a very broad scope of tasks to support. Current initiatives of the CEP as of 2023 include a project addressing plastic pollution called The Prevention of Marine Litter in the Caribbean Sea (PROMAR) and projects to restore mangrove forests and coral reefs.

In 2011, Justice Winston Anderson of the Caribbean Court of Justice expressed concern that the implementation of the Cartagena Convention had "lost some momentum" due in part to the need for legislation in Caribbean Community (CARICOM) states to implement aspects of the convention in their respective countries. He praised Trinidad and Tobago for its implementation of Cartagena Convention provisions through its Environmental Management Act 2000.

== See also ==
- The Caribbean
- Cruise ship pollution in the United States
- Environmental effects of shipping
- Environmental impacts of tourism in the Caribbean
- Environmental issues with coral reefs
- International Convention on Oil Pollution Preparedness, Response and Co-operation
- International Convention for the Prevention of Pollution of the Sea by Oil
- MARPOL 73/78
