= Grand Bois National Park =

National park in Haiti

- IUCN category II (national park)
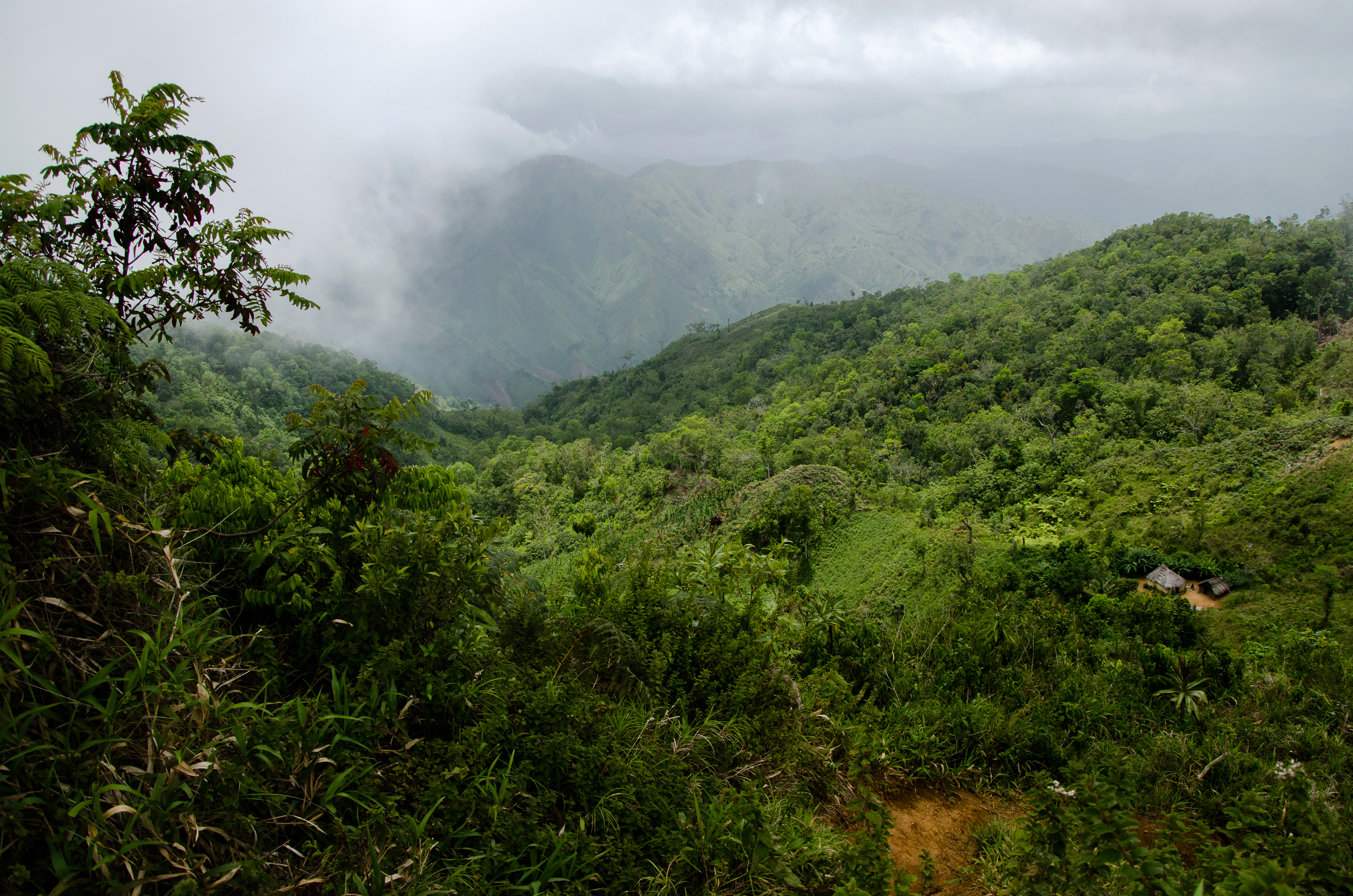
- View from the North ridge into a valley of Grand Bois National Park [Sarah L. Hanson]

- Location within Haiti
- Location: Haiti
- Nearest city: Tiburon
- Coordinates: 18°22′16″N 74°18′05″W
- Area: 3.7 km^{2} (1.4 sq mi)
- Established: 23 September 2015

Grand Bois National Park (French: Parc National Naturel de Grand Bois, Haitian Creole: Gran Bwa Pak Nasyonal) is a national park in Haiti. It was established on September 23, 2015, by Haitian president, Michel Martelly. The park is located in southwest Haiti, northwest of Les Anglais and it includes all areas on the mountain Morne Grand Bois of 900 meter elevation and higher. Morne Grand Bois sits directly on the border between the Sud department and the Grand'Anse department. Its highest peak is 1262 meters in elevation. Morne Grand Bois is an isolated mountain with remnant original (primary) rainforest.

The founders of the Haiti National Trust identified Morne Grand Bois as one of the landmarks of biodiversity in Haiti because it has a unique ecosystem of plant and animal species, which led to its establishment as a national park. On Grand Bois, they rediscovered a frog species that was believed to be extinct, the Tiburon stream frog / Foothill robber frog (Eleutherodactylus semipalmatus). A rare Magnolia tree species, Magnolia ekmanii, which has not been seen since Ekman's exploration, was also found. These and other plants and animals on Grand Bois are threatened because of ongoing deforestation, which also alters the water flow of streams and springs, affecting habitat for aquatic species and drinking water for people.

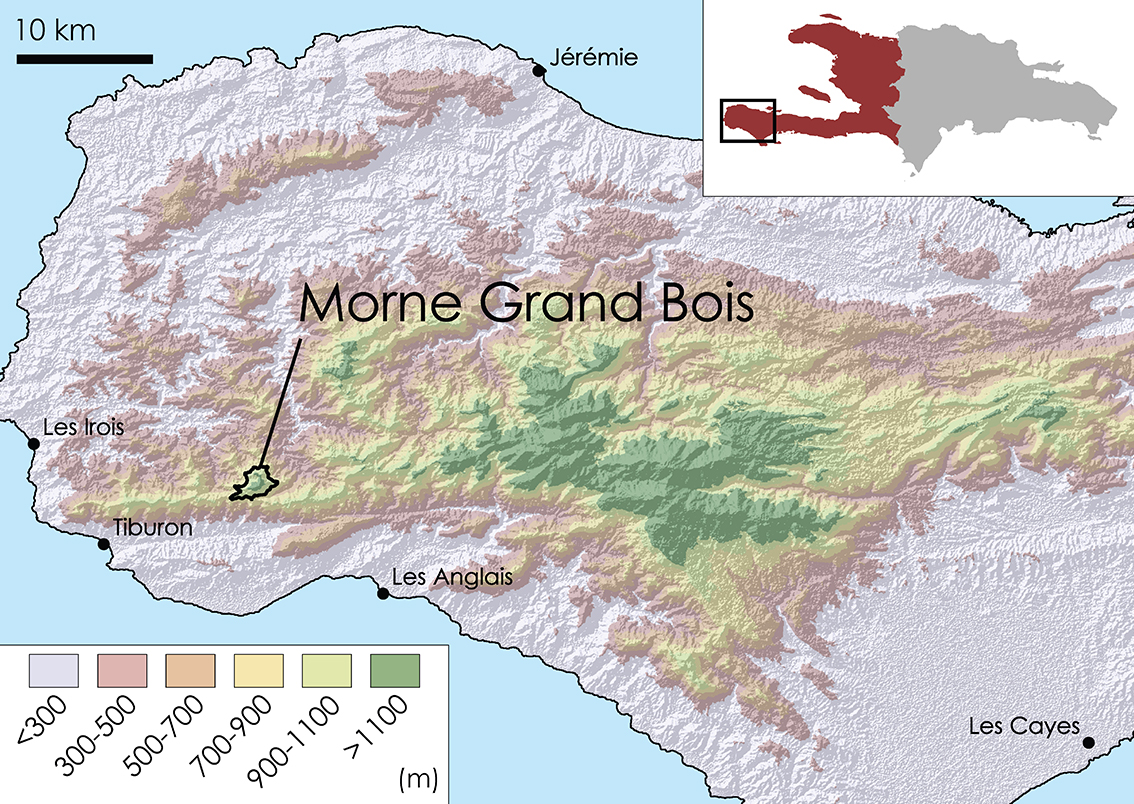
Park National Grand Bois boundaries on a topographic map of Haiti

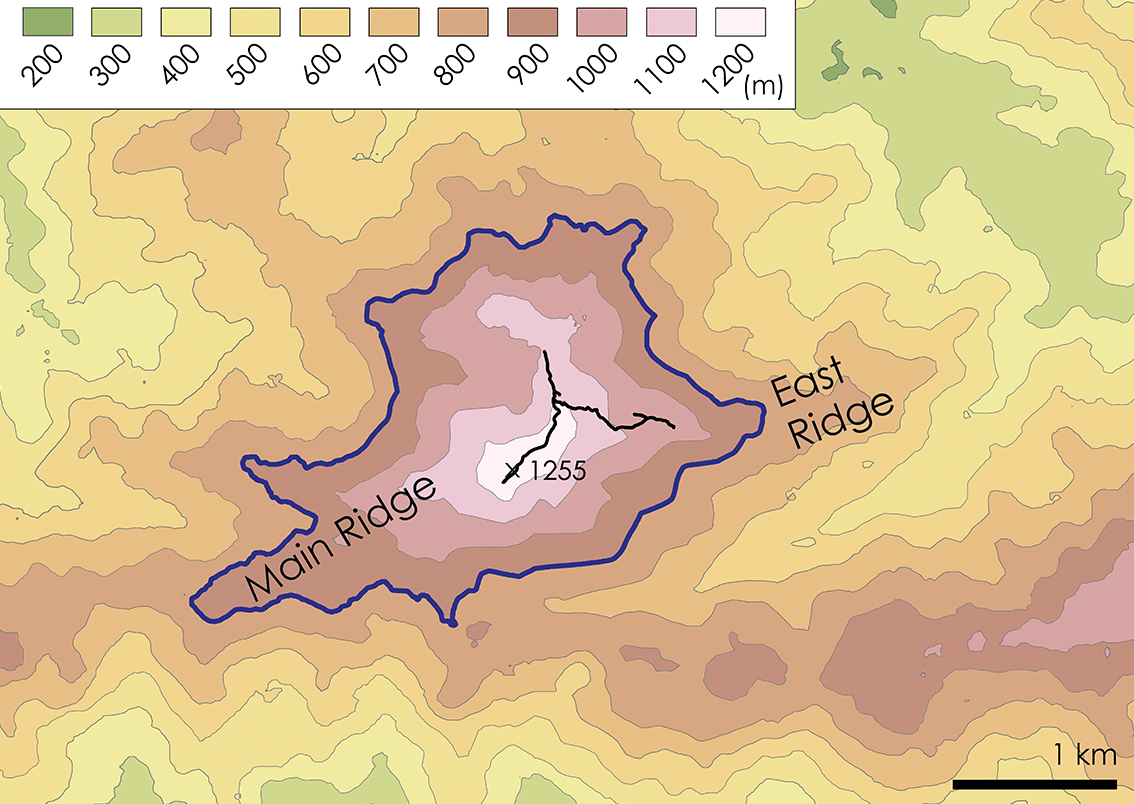
Detailed topographic map of Park National Grand Bois

== See also ==
- List of national parks of Haiti
- Haiti National Trust
