= Habitat/Species Management Area of Cahouane =

Mangrove management area in Haiti

Habitat/Species Protected Area of Cahouane
- IUCN category V (protected landscape/seascape)
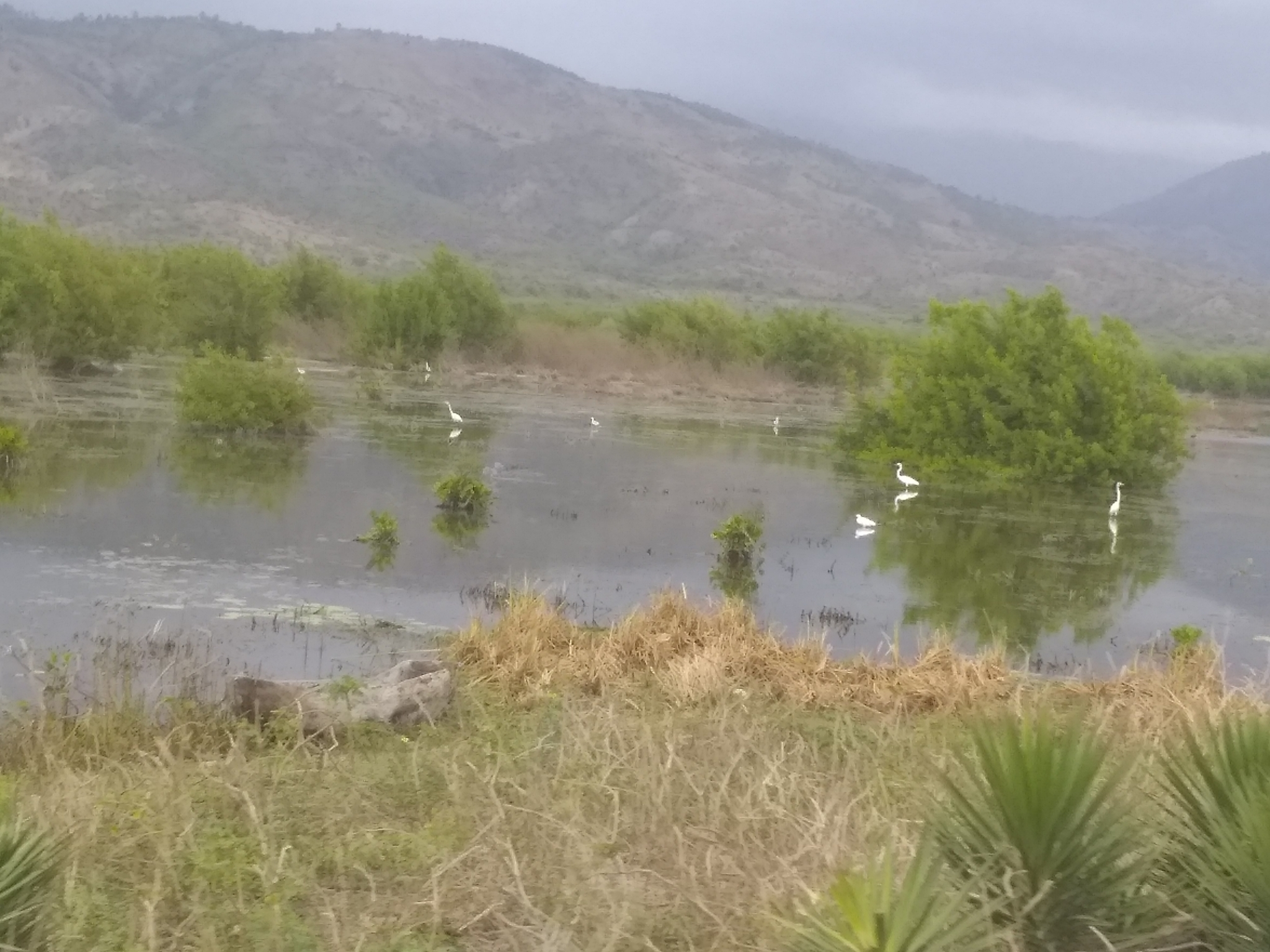
- Mangroves and egrets in the Habitat/Species Protected Area of Cahouane (M. Reith)

- Location within Haiti
- Location: Haiti
- Nearest city: Tiburon
- Coordinates: 18°17′00″N 74°19′00″W
- Area: 5,940 ha (22.9 sq mi)
- Established: 2013

Habitat/Species Protected Area of Cahouane (French: Aire Protégée Habitat/Especes de la Cahouane) is a mangrove management area located in southwestern Haiti near the village of Cahouane between Les Anglais and Tiburon. It was established in 2013. It is 59.4 square kilometres (22.9 sq mi) in size.

After Hurricane Allan in 1980, the lagoon had been overused and the mangroves cut down, until the area was nearly destroyed in 2015. The lagoon has been reforested, and the mangroves were successfully restored by 2020. Birds and aquatic organisms have returned.
