= Haiti National Trust =

Non-profit environmental organization

- Founded: 2015
- Founders: Philippe Bayard; S. Blair Hedges
- Purpose: Conservation
- Location: Pétion-Ville, Haiti
- Region served: Haiti
- Method: Scientific research
- Revenue: Donations
- Website: haititrust.org

Haiti National Trust is an international, non-governmental, and non-profit environmental organization dedicated to protecting the biodiversity of Haiti. The Haiti National Trust seeks to establish more protected areas, including national parks, and to stop the destruction of forests, which is the primary cause of species loss in Haiti. The trust also advocates protection of the country's fragile coral reefs and coastal ecosystems. It was founded in 2015 by Philippe Bayard, president and founding member of the Audubon Society of Haiti, and S. Blair Hedges, Laura H. Carnell Professor and director of the Center for Biodiversity at Temple University.

== Mission ==
Haiti National Trust's mission is to "identify the biodiversity hotspots of Haiti, acquire land for parks, and establish long-term protective measures". It works with the government of Haiti to assist in the protection of their existing national parks, and to help establish new parks.

== Hot spots of biodiversity ==
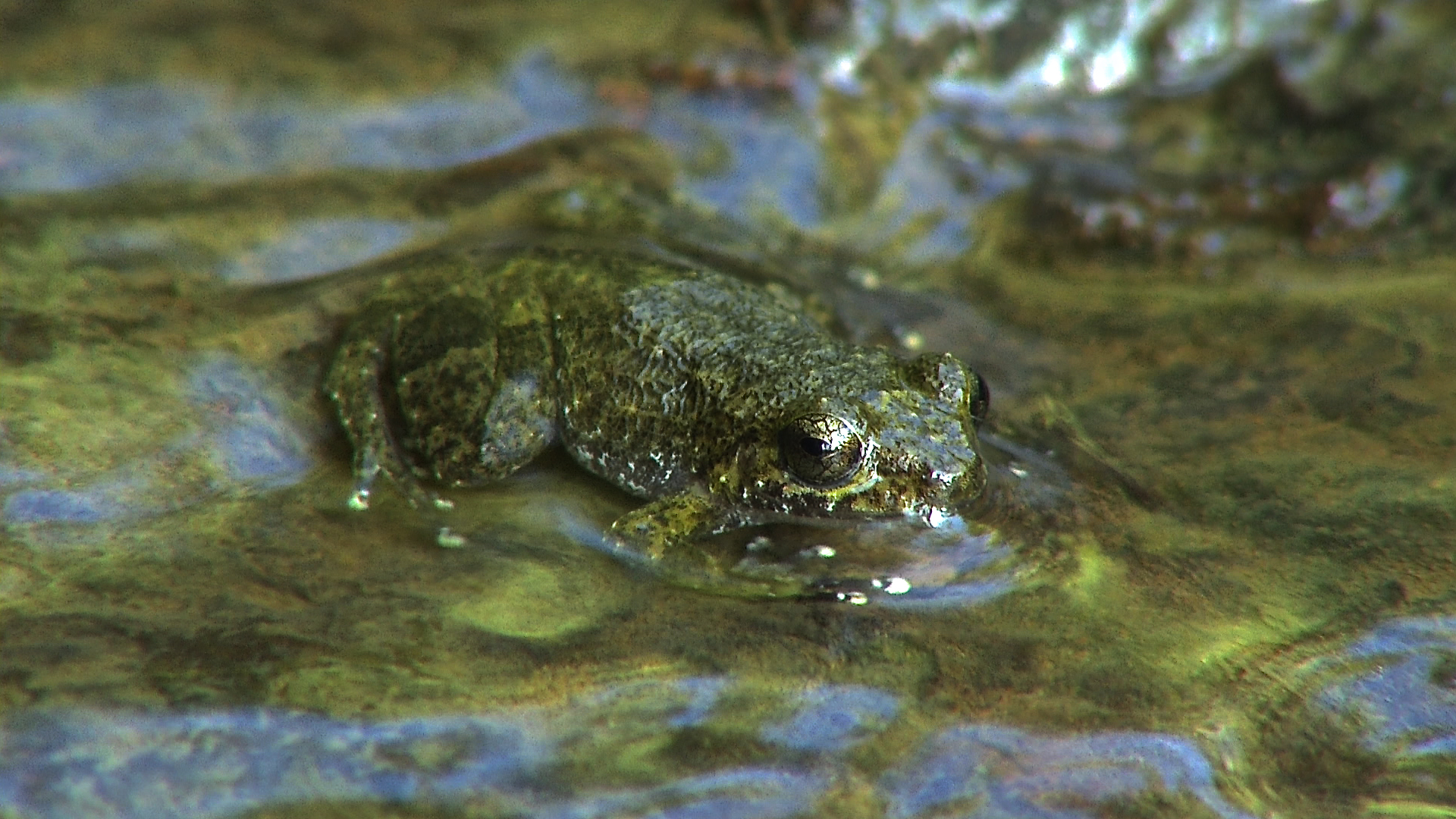
Tiburon stream frog (Eleutherodactylus semipalmatus)

The Caribbean Islands are recognized as a global hot spot of biodiversity. Because Haiti has a rich biodiversity which is nearly all threatened because old growth forests have been reduced to one or a few percent of their original extent, the country itself is considered a hot spot. The Haiti National Trust goes one step further and defines biodiversity hot spots within Haiti, most of which are at the tops of remote mountains where the last patches of original forest remain. Scientists and associates of the trust continue to search for these hot spots, usually with a helicopter, and have so far identified 12: Bellevue, Bois Pangnol, Deux Mamelles, Grand Bois, Grande Colline, La Gonâve, La Selle, La Visite, Macaya, Morne Basile, Morne Boeuf, and Tête Boeuf. Two of those, La Visite and Macaya, were the two original national parks of Haiti and their biodiversity has been studied by teams of biologists in the past. Most of the remaining hot spots were poorly known or unknown before teams of biologists and students, led by the Haiti National Trust cofounders, visited the sites to survey vertebrates, selected plants, and other species. This work led to the discovery of new species of lizards, frogs, and plants, and the rediscovery of vertebrates and plants thought to be extinct such as the Tiburon stream frog (Eleutherodactylus semipalmatus), La Hotte twig anole (Anolis darlingtoni), and Ekman's magnolia (Magnolia ekmanii).

== New national parks established ==
The initial three biodiversity hot spots identified by Haiti National Trust cofounders and their team were declared national parks by Haitian president, Michel Martelly, and his government. Grande Colline National Park (PNN-GC) was established on 23 July 2014 and is 1,510 hectares. Grand Bois National Park (PNN-GB) was established on 23 September 2015 and is 370 hectares. Deux Mamelles National Park (PNN-DM) was established on 23 September 2015 and is 2,265 hectares. Previously there were only two national parks in Haiti, both established in 1983: Pic Macaya National Park (PNNM) and La Visite National Park.

== See also ==
- List of national parks of Haiti
