= Audubon Society of Haiti =

Non-profit environmental organization

- Founded: 2003
- Founders: Philippe Bayard; Jacky Lumarque; Florence Sergile
- Type: Non-profit organization
- Purpose: Conservation
- Location: Pétion-Ville, Haiti
- Region served: Haiti
- Method: Scientific research Education; Outreach; Partnerships
- Revenue: Donations
- Website: audubonhaiti.org

The Audubon Society of Haiti is a non-governmental, non-profit environmental organization dedicated to the conservation and restoration of Haiti’s biodiversity and natural ecosystems . Through the organization’s strides toward conservation of the environment, they are also working towards improving the quality of life for the Haitian people. Their activities include scientific research, education, outreach, and establishing local and international partnerships. The organization was founded in July 2003 by Philippe Bayard, Jacky Lumarque and Florence Sergile. It was named in honor of John James Audubon, an ornithologist, naturalist and native of Les Cayes, who painted, cataloged, and described birds of North America in the famous elephant folio book Birds of America.

== Research ==
Like Audubon, the Audubon Society of Haiti specializes in ornithology and has published three books about birds in Haiti: A La Décourverte des Oiseaux d’Haiti, Birds of the Dominican Republic and Haiti, and Ti Zwazo Kote wa Prale.

Since 2004, research surveys and biological expeditions have been conducted in unprotected areas of Haiti, abundant in biodiversity and vulnerable to extinction due to the loss of habitat. Their research is in collaboration with local partners, University of Haiti and Quisqueya University, and international partners, Vermont Center for Ecostudies, Conservation International, Sliven Institute of Ecology, Technical University in Zvolen, Hispaniolan Ornithological Society, Santo Domingo Botanical Gardens, Cornell Ornithology Lab, the Center for Biodiversity at Temple University, and the Philadelphia Zoo.
