= Petit Paradis =

- Town
- Location in Haiti
- Coordinates: 18°29′0″N 72°38′01″W
- Country: Haiti
- Department: Ouest
- Arrondissement: Léogâne
- Time zone: UTC-05:00 (EST)
  - Summer (DST): UTC-04:00 (EDT)

Petit Paradis (French: Little Paradise) is a town in the Léogâne Arrondissement in the Ouest department of Haiti.

== 2010 Haiti earthquake ==
A tsunami wave three metres or higher hit the beach shortly after the 12 January 2010 earthquake killing several residents. The area was subsided and a large portion of the beach remained submerged. The tsunami reached several hundred yards into the village, destroying several homes, and sweeping several people out to sea, some of them killed.

US Navy Seabees and US Marines arrived at the beach on the 22nd, and started to distribute aid on the 23rd.
