= Hispaniolan Ornithological Society =

Non-profit organization on the island of Hispaniola

SOH logo, bearing the silhouette of the palmchat, national bird of the Dominican Republic

The Hispaniolan Ornithological Society (Spanish: Sociedad Ornitológica de la Hispaniola) is a non-profit environmental organization dedicated to nature conservation, particularly of birds and their habitats, on the island of Hispaniola (Haiti and the Dominican Republic). SOH's mission is to "conserve Hispaniolan birds and their habitats through research, community education, and professional training".

Established in the Dominican Republic in 2001 and incorporated by presidential decree #85504, the SOH was founded by a group of bird watchers and biologists committed with the conservation of birds and their natural environments.

Education programs include promoting bird watching as well as giving presentations on local birds in public schools, private schools, and in rural communities. Through some of its members, SOH has the most complete database of bird and nature images on the island, which are used extensively as visual aides for nature and conservancy public awareness. It is the Dominican institution with the most members who are fully trained to perform professional studies of avifauna. The group has several year's experience collaborating and assisting in multiple research and bird monitoring projects, most of them conducted by ornithologists from the United States.

SOH has strong relationships with other conservation organizations, with which it has partnered in important projects. Field work conducted in collaboration with these entities includes studies of the critically endangered Ridgway's hawk (Buteo ridgwayi), nest cavity restoration for the Hispaniolan parrot (Amazona ventralis), and wintering ecology of the Bicknell's thrush (Catharus bicknelli).
