= Magnolia ekmanii =

Conservation status
- Critically Endangered (IUCN 3.1)

Scientific classification
- Kingdom: Plantae
- Clade: Embryophytes
- Clade: Tracheophytes
- Clade: Spermatophytes
- Clade: Angiosperms
- Clade: Magnoliids
- Order: Magnoliales
- Family: Magnoliaceae
- Genus: Magnolia
- Species: M. ekmanii

Binomial name
- Magnolia ekmanii Urb.

Species of plant

Magnolia ekmanii is a critically endangered species of magnolia endemic to southwestern Haiti on the island of Hispaniola in the Caribbean.

== Etymology ==
The species has been given the specific epithet "ekmanii" to honour the Swedish botanist Erik Leonard Ekman, who first documented it scientifically.

== Description ==
M. ekmanii is a slow growing tree, with oblong simple alternate leaves and white flowers. The leaves have a shiny upper side and are superficially similar to the leaves of the often-cultivated Santo Domingo apricot (Mammea americana). This inspired the Haitian Creole name of the plant: abriko moron (lit. "wild apricot"). The flowering period starts in June and peaks mid of July. Seeds are released from ripe fruit in the two months from mid of November to mid of January.

== Distribution ==
The species is endemic to southwestern Haiti, known only from a few mountains in the Occidental Massif de la Hotte. The main population grows on Morne Grand Bois in Grand Bois National Park.
