= Three Bays Protected Area =

- IUCN category IV (habitat/species management area)
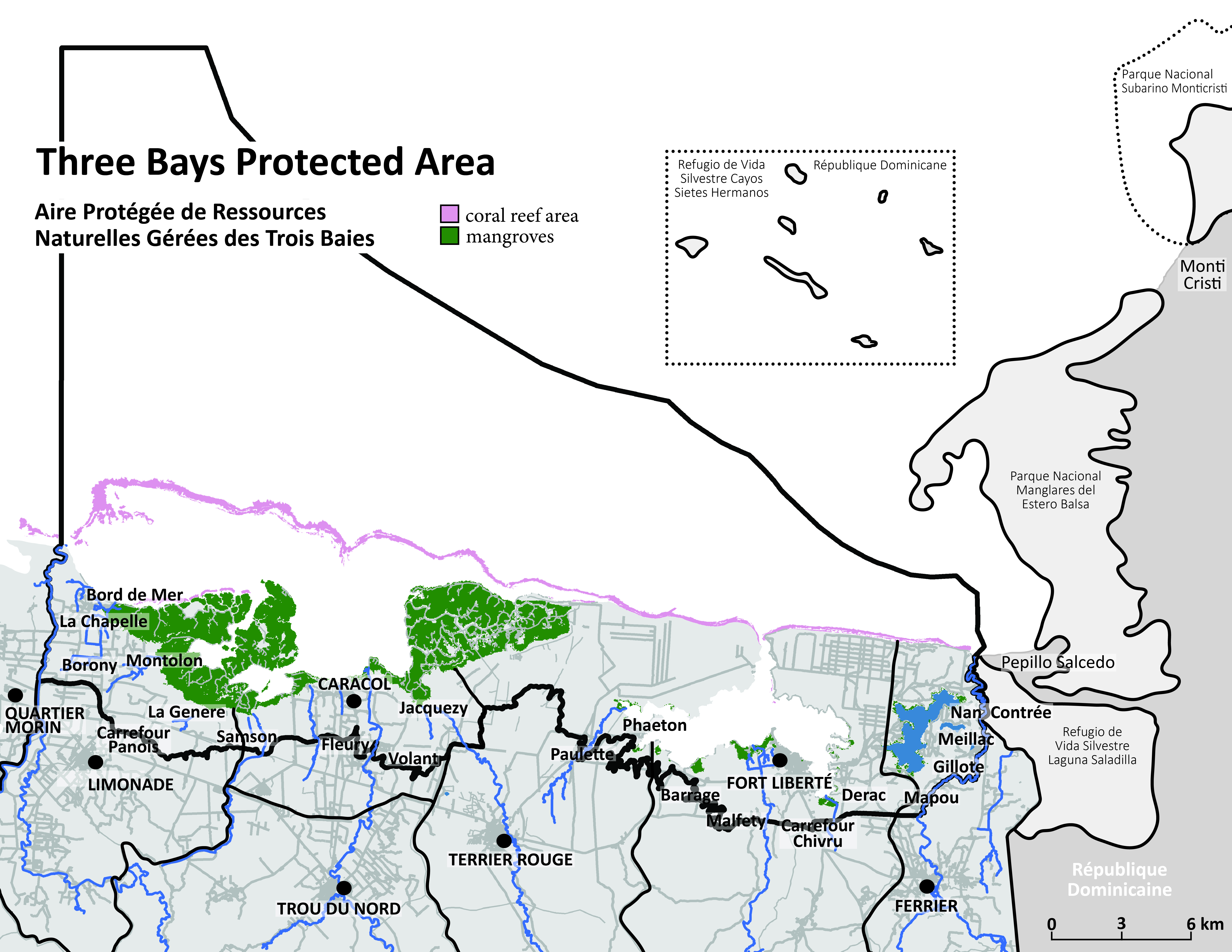
- Three Bays Protected Area boundaries

- Location within Haiti
- Location: Haiti
- Nearest city: Cap-Haïtien
- Coordinates: 19.8°N 72.0°W
- Area: 75,406 ha (291.14 sq mi)
- Established: 2014
- Governing body: co-managed by ANAP and FoProBiM

Three Bays Protected Area (Aire Protégée de Ressources Naturelles Gérées des Trois Baies), also known as Three Bays National Park, is a protected area in northeastern Haiti. It protects coral reefs, seagrass beds, mangrove forests, and dry forests.

== Geography ==
The Three Bays Protected Area has a boundary perimeter of approximately 170 km (110 mi) encompassing over 75,000 ha (190,000 acres). It is the second largest declared protected area in Haiti after the Port Salut/Aquin Protected Area (Aire Protégée de Ressources Naturelles Gérées de Port Salut/Aquin).

The east–west boundary of the Three Bays Protected Area extends for over 40 km (25 mi) from Massacre River (bordering the Dominican Republic, where it is known as Dajabón River) to the Grande-Rivière-du-Nord to the west. The north–south boundary extends from the 12 miles (19 km) territorial sea limit inland to the 10-m topographic contour line. The western boundary is near Cap-Haïtien, Haiti's second largest city and capital of the Nord (Haitian department), served by Hugo Chávez International Airport and the Port international du Cap-Haïtien. The eastern boundary includes Fort Liberté, the capital of the Nord-Est (department), which is one of the oldest cities in the country and where Haiti's independence was proclaimed. The protected area is also directly adjacent to the 'Parque Nacional Manglares de Estero Balsa' in the Dominican Republic, near the city of 'San Fernando de Monte Cristi', as well as national parks 'Parque Nacional Submarino de Monte Cristi', Parque Nacional el Morro'. marine refuge 'Cayos Sietes Hermanos' and wildlife refuge 'Laguna Saladilla'.

== Ecology ==
The area contains some of the most extensive and healthiest fringing and barrier coral reefs, seagrass beds, and mangrove forests in the country, which provide critical coastal protection and ecosystem services for its seaside communities. The area is biologically productive but extremely overfished by many regional communities. The adjoining coastal plains are known for their diverse aquatic and brackish water habitats and dry tropical forests.

== History ==
The region is also of historical importance, having witnessed centuries of human history dating from pre-Columbian times and indigenous Taino occupations, to the arrival of Christopher Columbus and the sequence of world-altering events through Spanish and French colonization and the Haitian Revolution. The mountaintop fortress of the Citadelle Laferrière, a UNESCO World Heritage Site located approximately 10 miles (16 km) southwest, provides a bird's eye view of the Three Bays Protected Area.

== Conservation ==
This IUCN Category IV — Habitat/Species Management Area was created by Presidential Decree on March 21 (2014) to protect its unique marine complex of fringing and barrier coral reefs, seagrass beds, mangrove forests, and adjacent deep ocean and coastal plain. It is the first protected area in the country to be co-managed by the Agence Nationale des Aires Protégées (ANAP) of the Ministry of the Environment and the non-governmental/non-profit organization Fondation pour la Protection de la Biodiversité Marine (FoProBiM).

Le Moniteur (21 Mars 2014)- Creation Aire Protegee des Trois Baies

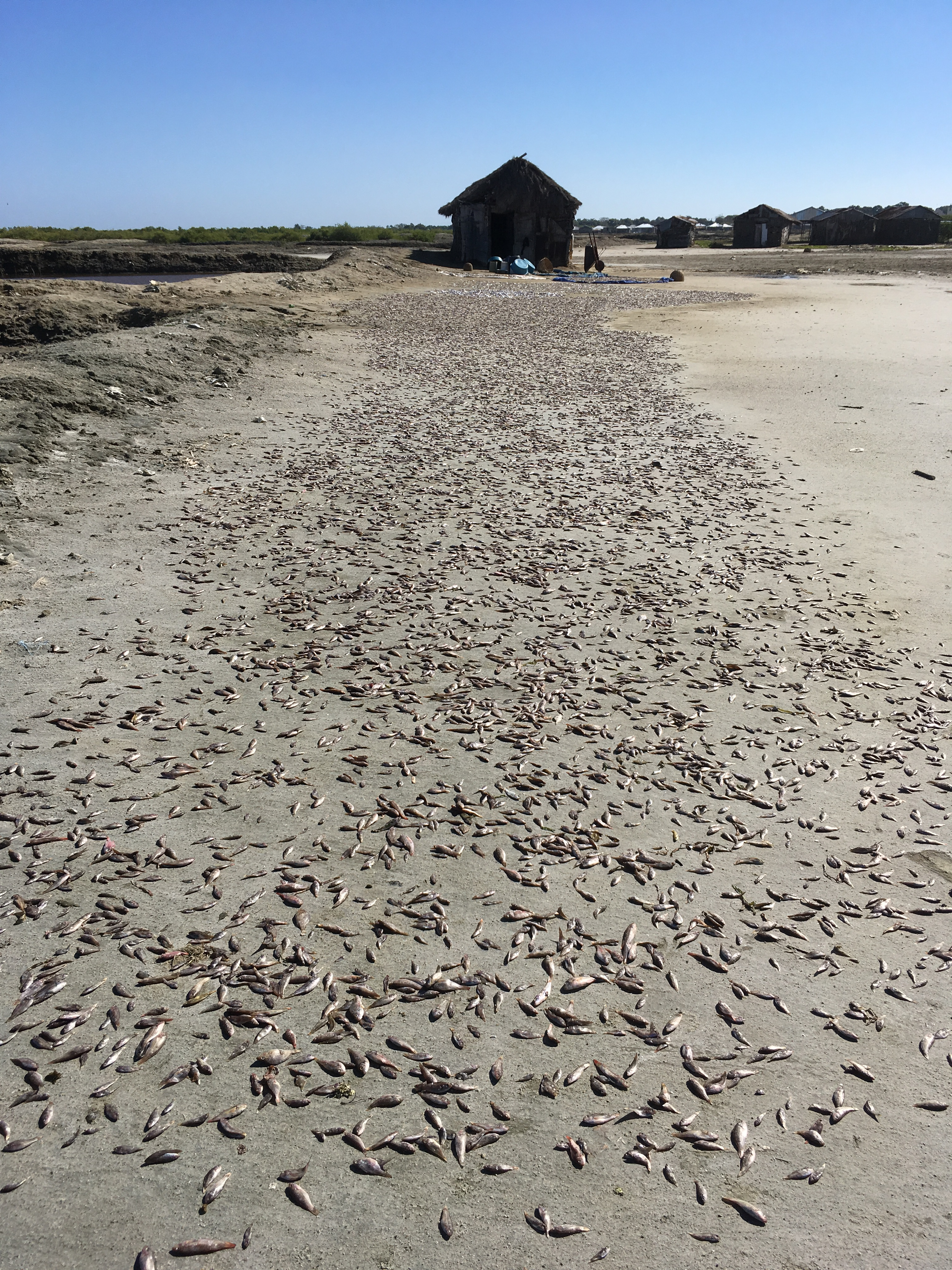
Sun-dried fish in Caracol, Nord-Est

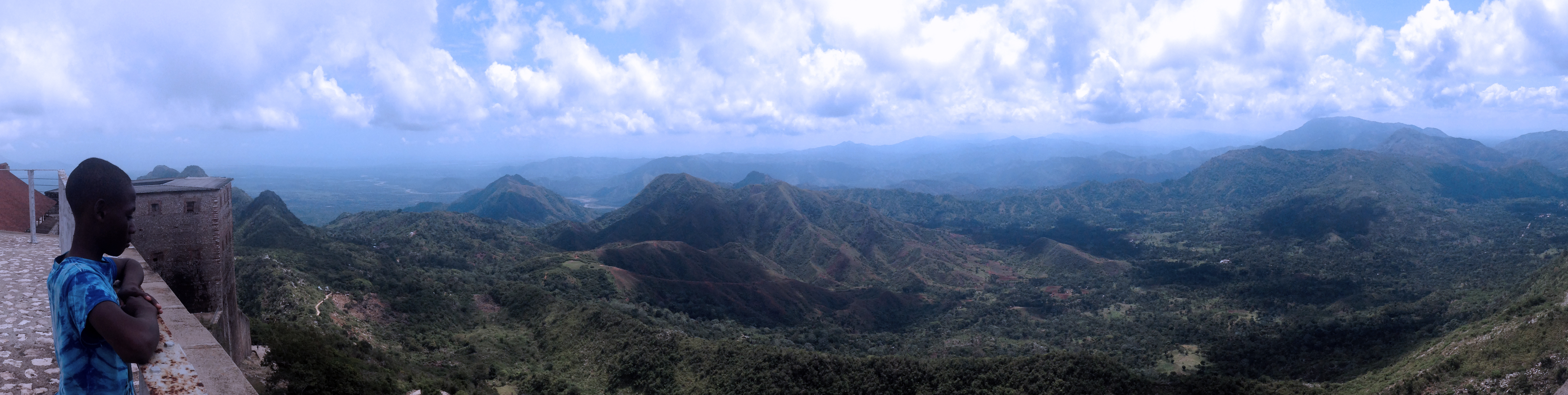
Three Bays Protected Area on the horizon (from Citadelle Laferrière)
