= Environmental impacts of tourism in the Caribbean =

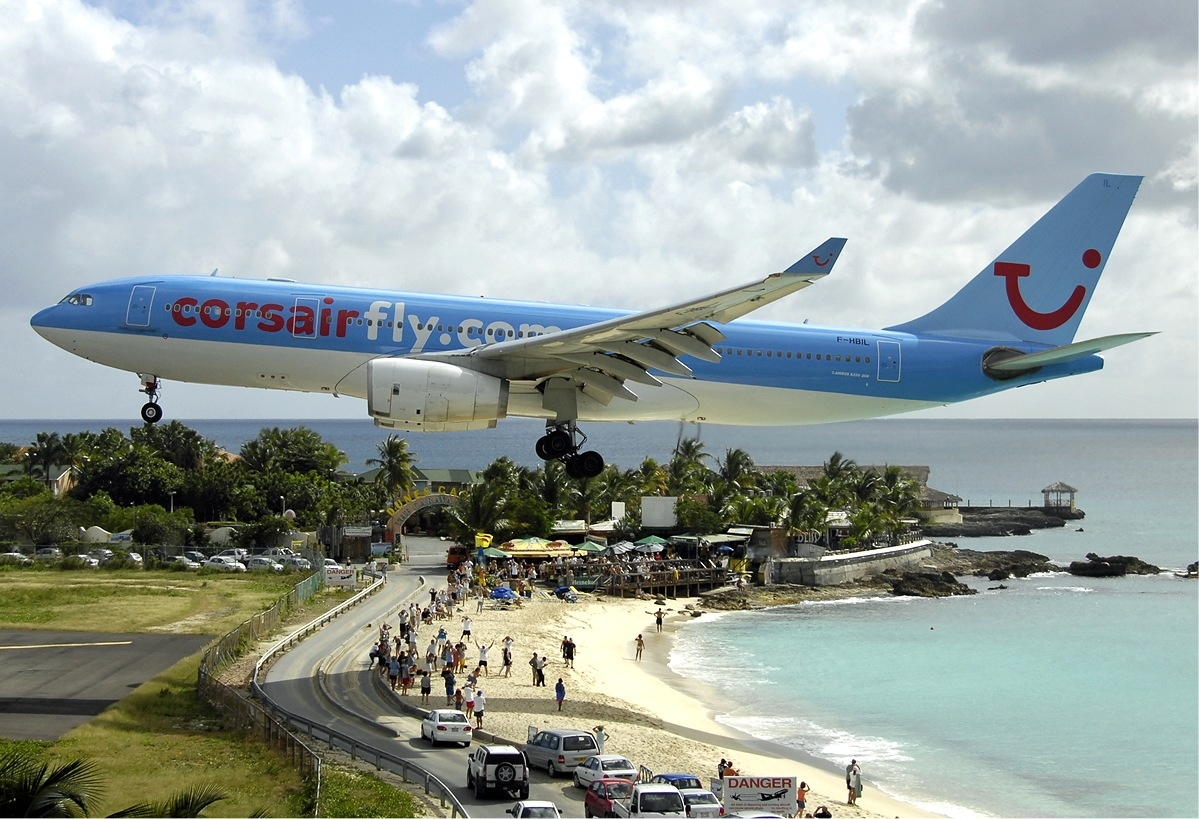
Maho Beach in Saint Martin

The economy in the Caribbean region is highly dependent on its tourism industry; in 2013, this industry constituted 14% of their total GDP. This region is largely appealing for the sun, sand, and sea scene. Despite the fact that tourism is very reliant on the natural environment of the region, it has negative environmental impacts. These impacts include marine pollution and degradation, as well as a high demand for water and energy resources. In particular, the degradation of coral reefs has a large impact on the environment of the Caribbean. Environmental damage affects the tourism industry; therefore, the tourism sector, along with the public sector, makes efforts to protect the environment for economic and ethical reasons. Although these efforts are not always effective, there are continuous efforts for improvement.

High levels of tourism occur because the tourism industry provides extravagant lifestyle options for tourists. For instance, visitors use about three times the amount of water per day than residents. Furthermore, waste management from the tourism industry is inefficient and the waste services in most of these countries cannot cope with the large numbers of tourists, who are estimated to generate up to four times more solid waste than residents.

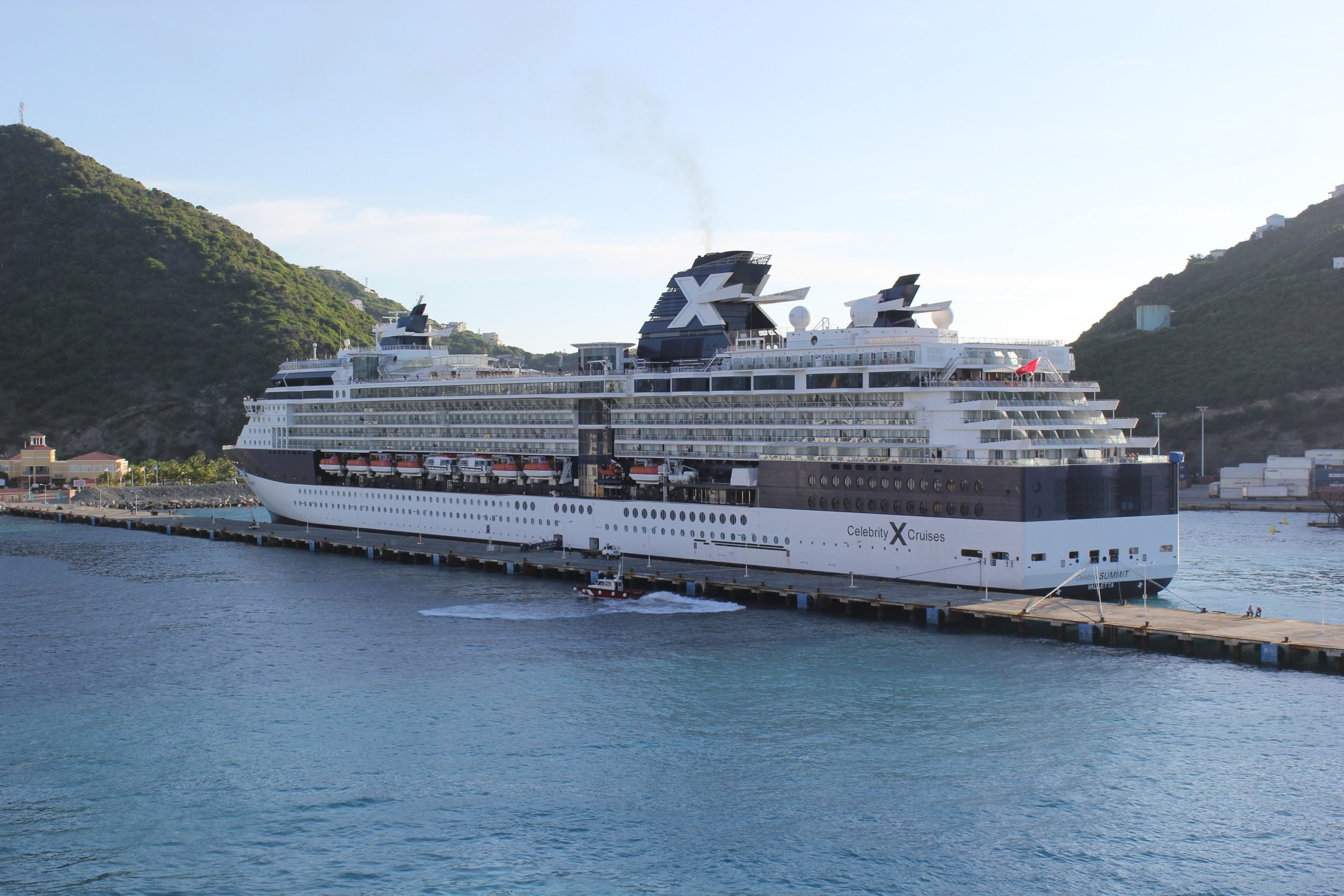
Cruise ships discharge waste into the sea

Another impact of tourism is marine pollution from cruise ships discharging waste into the sea. One single trip of a large cruise ship on average produces 210,000 gallons of sewage, 1,000,000 gallons of grey water, 125 gallons of toxic chemicals and hazardous waste, 8 tons of garbage and 25,000 gallons of oily bilge water. Although there have been attempts to regulate this kind of discharge, most of this waste is still dumped into the sea (Tourism in the Caribbean, Duval 2004). Some cruise ships are managing their waste by reducing the impact through advanced sewage systems, shipboard recycling programs, and increased use of biodegradable alternatives to plastic. However, their industry has increased about 60% from the 1980s to 2003. Therefore, they reduce the damage of their discharge but increase the quantity discharged.

This type of marine litter damages the wildlife and the environment in which they live; for instance, it affects 14% of Caribbean coral reefs. This is not the only way that tourism is affecting the coral reefs; cruise ships and boats anchoring in coral reefs areas have also caused their depletion. For example, in January 2016, Paul Allan's 300-foot yacht destroyed 14,000 square feet of reef in the Cayman Islands; this was about 80% of the coral in the area. These types of damages can be subject to fines but often go without government intervention and fines. In addition, scuba diving affects the nature of the coral reefs, in many cases changing the coral ecosystem and making them more susceptible to decreases. Coral reefs are particularly important in this region because they form part of the marine life and they provide protection to the coastal line.

Tourism also causes other indirect environmental impacts. For instance, it causes people to resettle in tourist areas; thus having a high requirement for housing and infrastructure. This requirement is not met, which leads to problems of solid and liquid waste disposal due to inadequate infrastructure. (Dixon, 2001, p. 7) The GIWA Regional Assessment 4 for the Islands of the Greater Antilles demonstrated that the impacts of liquid waste in this sub-region include fish mortality, eutrophication, and threats to coral reefs, swamp ecosystems and seagrass beds.

== Improvements ==
=== Ecotourism ===
Ecotourism is one of the solutions that have been applied for more sustainable tourism development. In the Caribbean island nation of Dominica, this solution has been applied. Although this is a better alternative for tourism, it does not ensure the protection of the environment. A study in Dominica demonstrated that the main benefit of ecotourism is economic growth rather than effective nature preservation. On the contrary, the growth of the industry is increasing the numbers of tourists, which causes a strain on the resources and the environment of the region.

=== Incentives ===
In 1983, the Convention for the Protection and Development of the Marine Environment of the Wider Caribbean Region has been an important regional framework for the protection of the Caribbean Sea. This convention helped by establishing a series of protocols directed at the protection of the environment of the Caribbean. Furthermore, enforcing regulations, Barbados presents a great example of protecting the environment through Market-Based Instruments. These instruments include duty and tariff relief of environmental equipment by hotels, and tax-deductible installation of taps and water heads. Market-Based Instruments work as incentives for the enhancement of the industry practices.

Moreover, tourism vastly relies on the environment because people go to the Caribbean nations for their seaside ambiance. Here the environment is used to generate economic rents, which are the costs to tourist for the use of resources. For example, the premium people pay for rooms with ocean view. This reliance on the environment also works as an incentive for the tourism sector to develop a self-regulating system. Some of these systems include the Green Globe and Blue Flag certification schemes; which represent a sense of ecologic consciousness from the tourism sector. These schemes endorse industry accountability and provide them credibility to the public. The Caribbean Alliance for Sustainable Tourism has worked with Green Globe to develop these certifications throughout the Caribbean.
