= List of amphibians and reptiles of Antigua and Barbuda =

Location of Antigua and Barbuda in the Caribbean.

This is a list of amphibians and reptiles found in Antigua and Barbuda, an island nation in the Caribbean Lesser Antilles. It consists of the two main islands of Antigua and Barbuda, and many smaller islets, including the uninhabited Redonda.

== Amphibians ==
There are three species of amphibian recorded in Antigua and Barbuda, only one of which is native or found on both main islands.

=== Frogs (Anura) ===
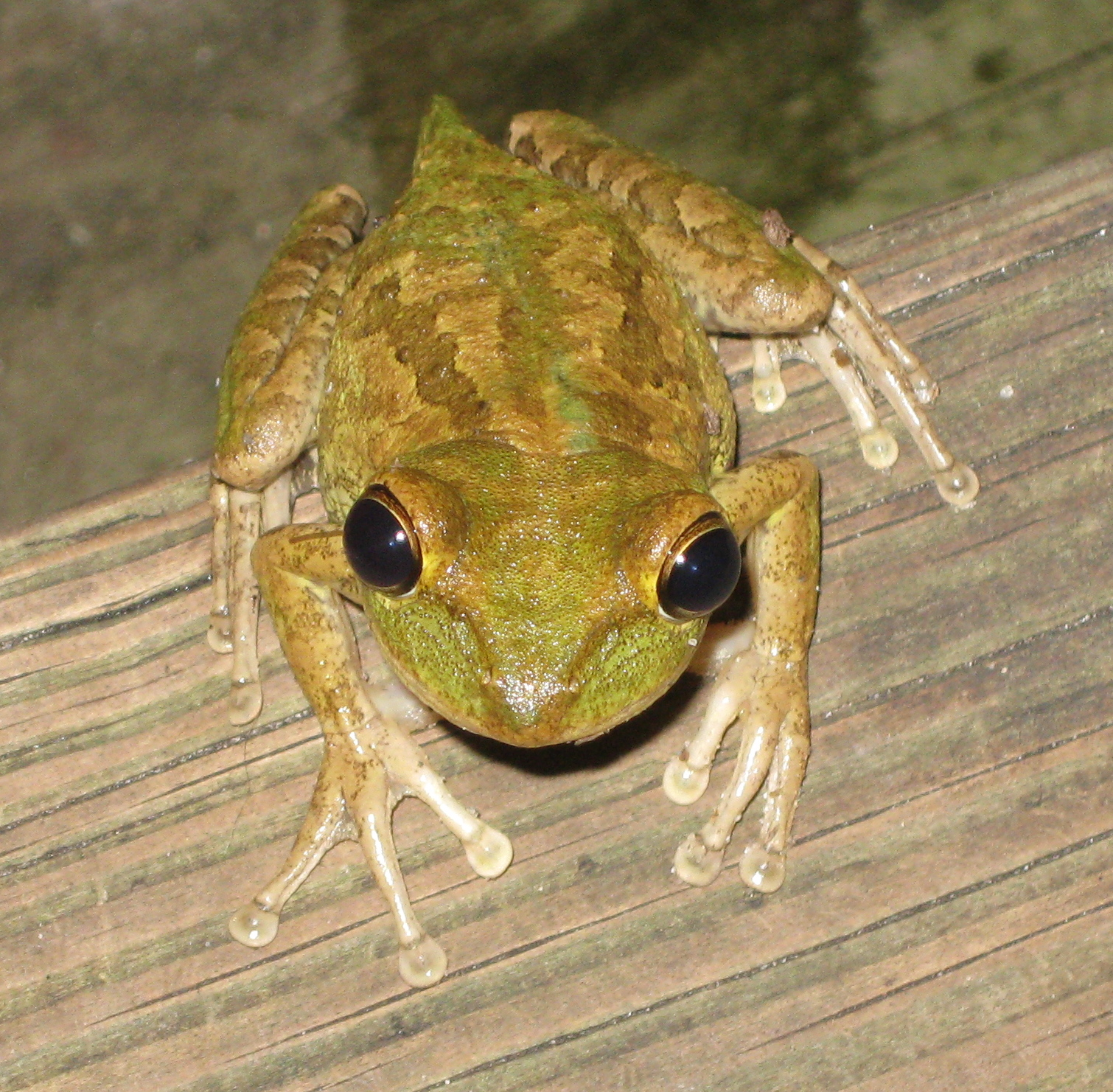
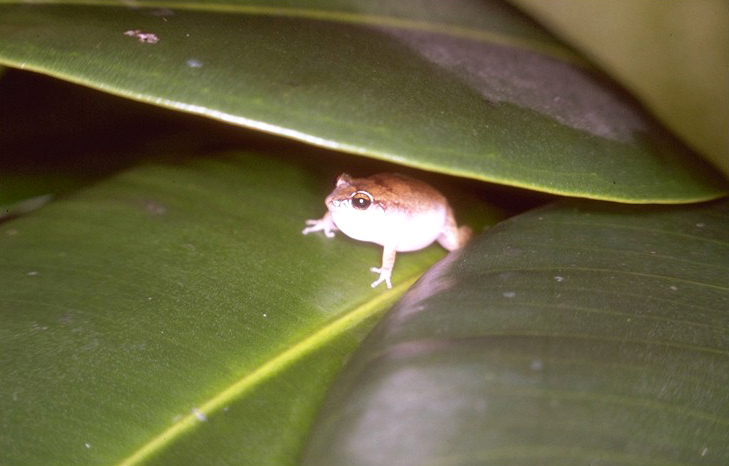
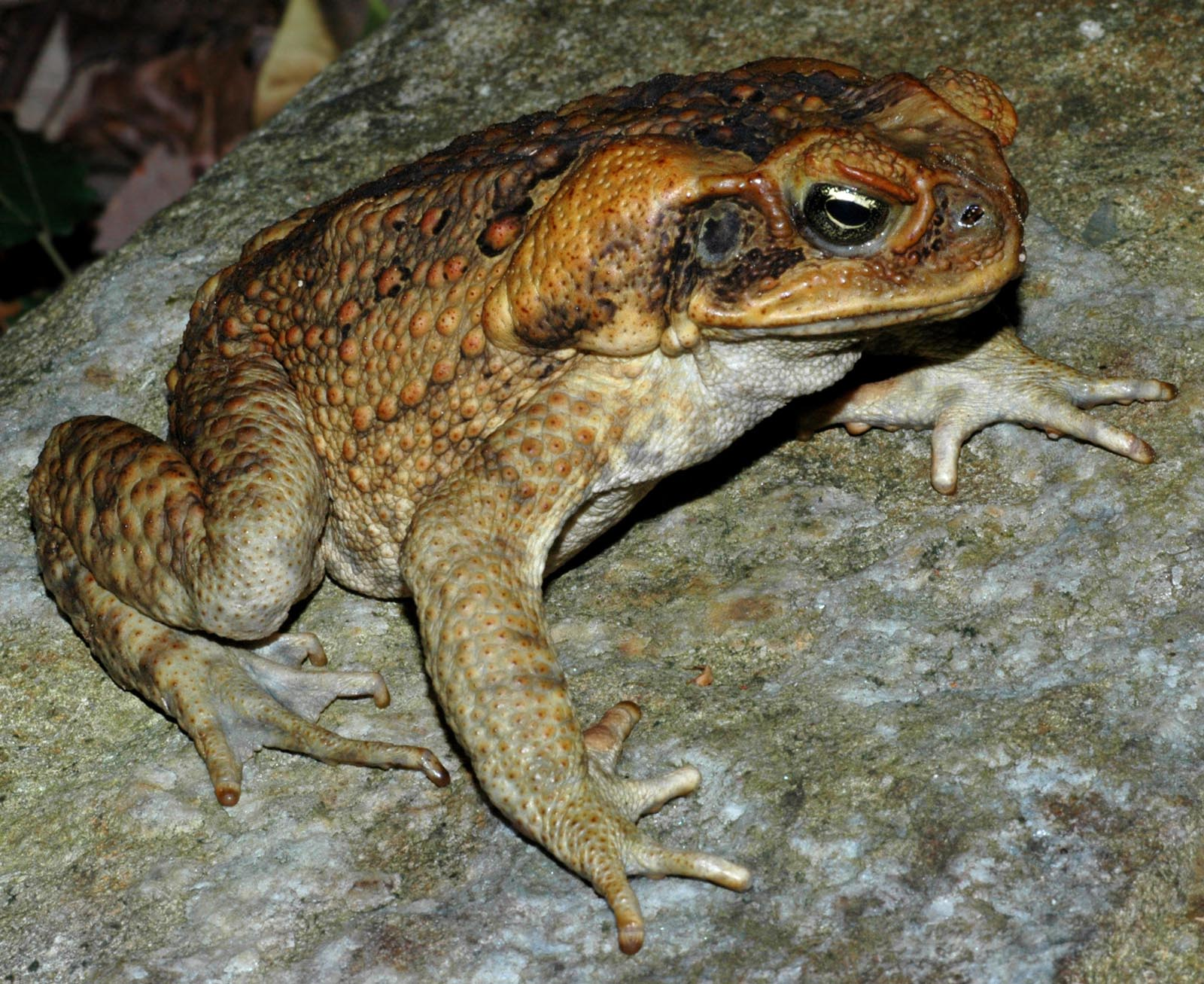
Tree frogs (Hylidae)
Species	Common name(s)	Notes	Image
Osteopilus septentrionalis	Cuban tree frog	Least concern. Introduced; recently recorded as established on Antigua.
Tropical frogs (Leptodactylidae)
Species	Common name(s)	Notes	Image
Eleutherodactylus johnstonei	Lesser Antillean whistling frog, coqui Antillano, Johnstone's whistling frog	Least concern. Present on both main islands.
True toads (Bufonidae)
Species	Common name(s)	Notes	Image
Bufo marinus	Cane toad, giant neotropical toad, marine toad	Least concern. Introduced to Antigua.

== Reptiles ==
Including marine turtles and introduced species on all islands, there are 19 reptile species reported in Antigua and Barbuda, with an additional species unconfirmed. Nine species are present on both main islands. Six species are endemic to the islands of Antigua and Barbuda, of which five are only found on one island.

=== Turtles (Testudines) ===
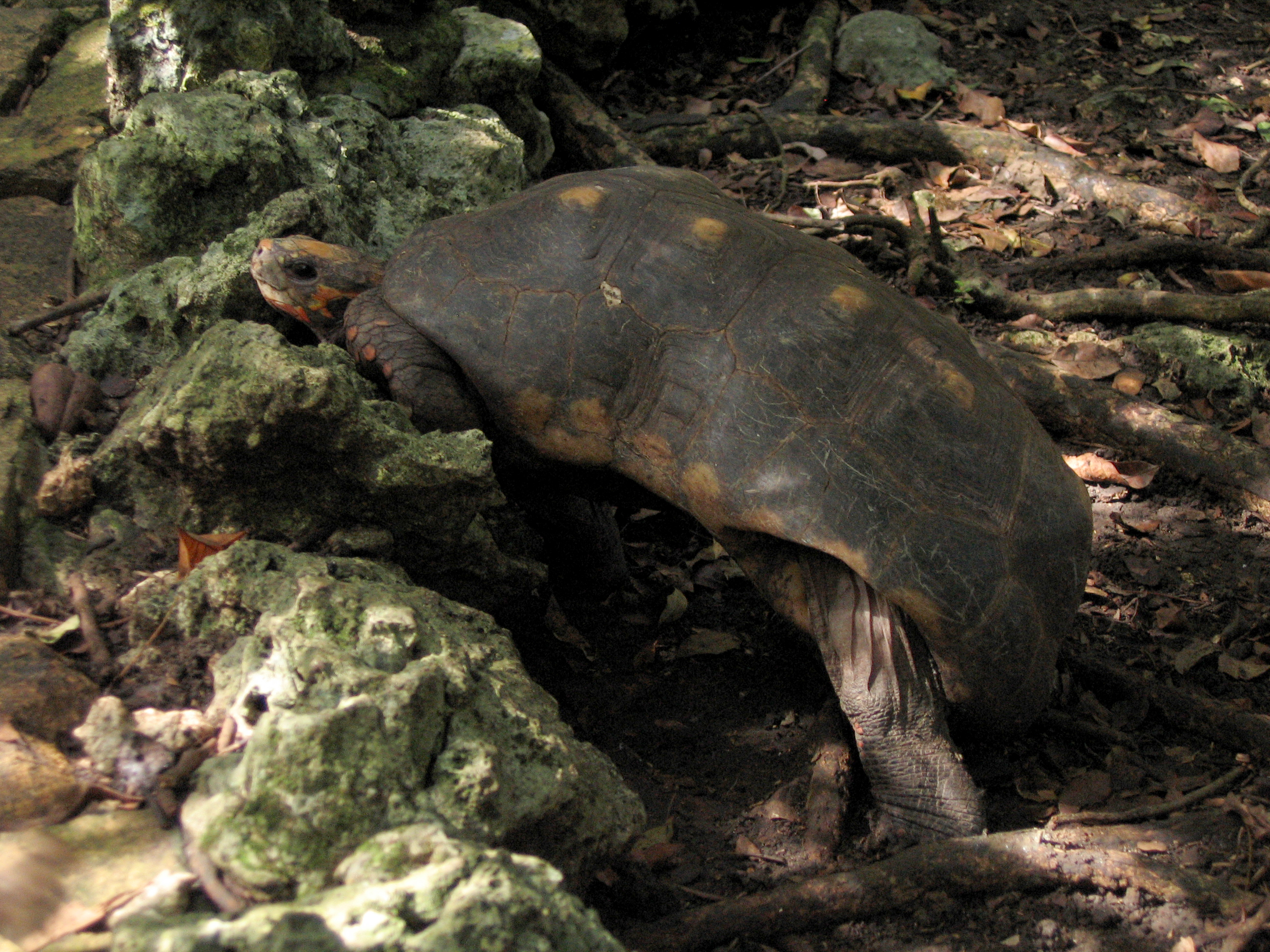
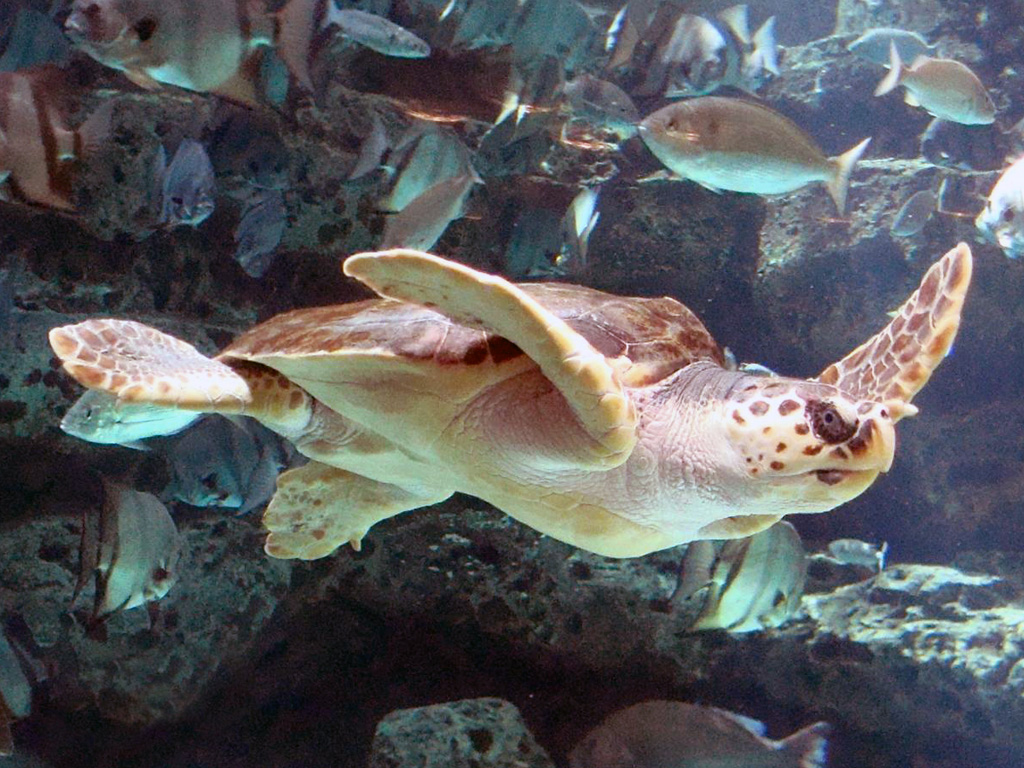
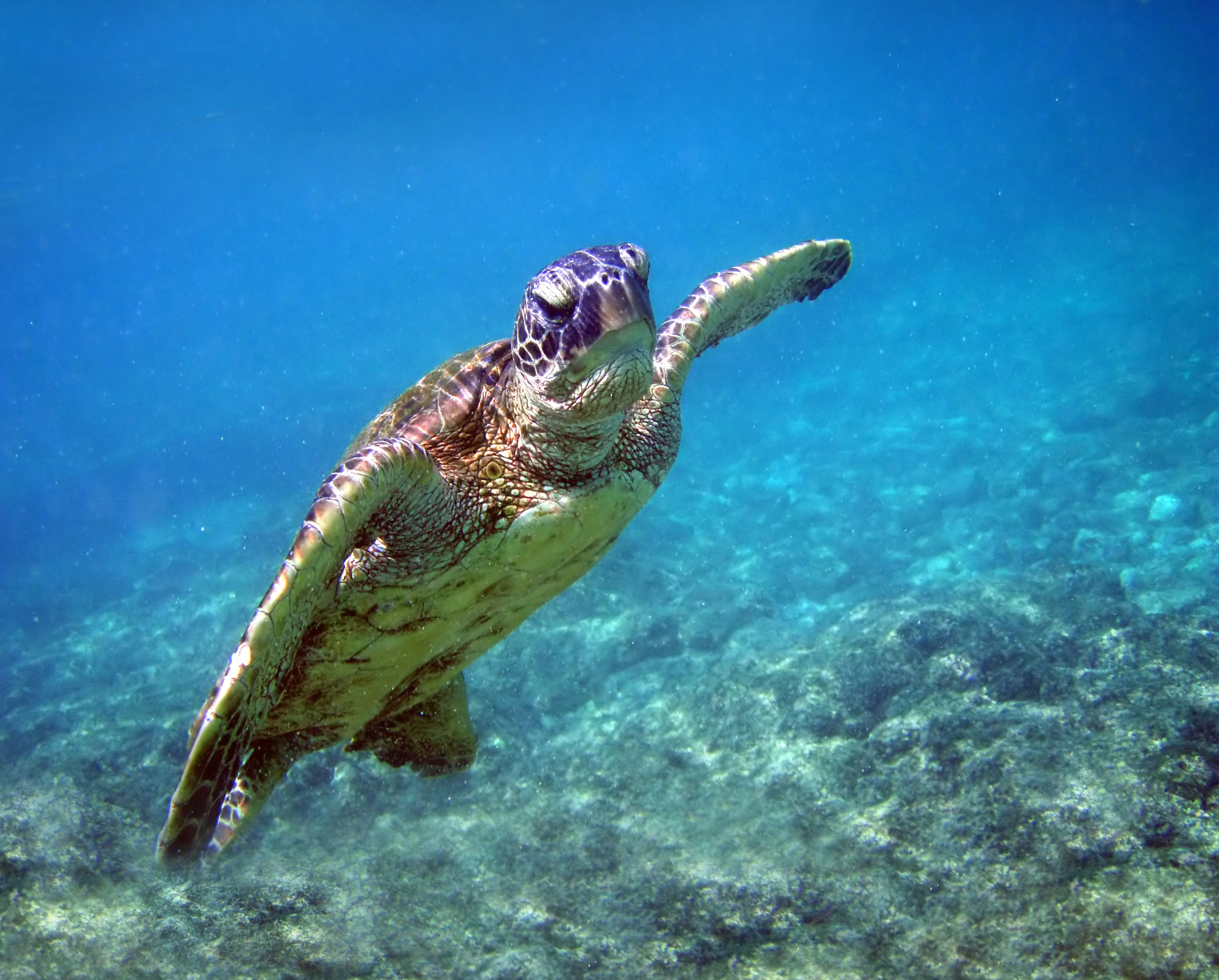
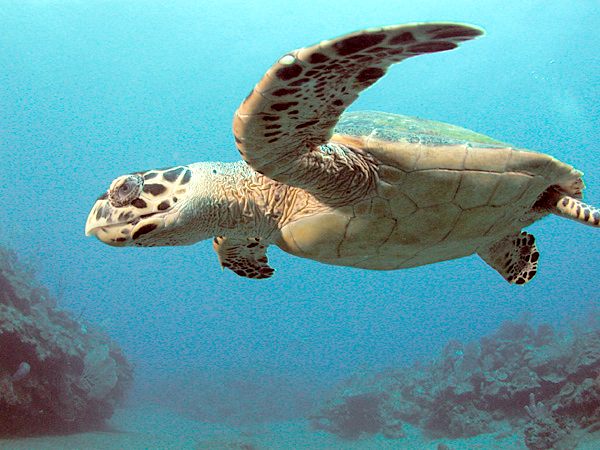
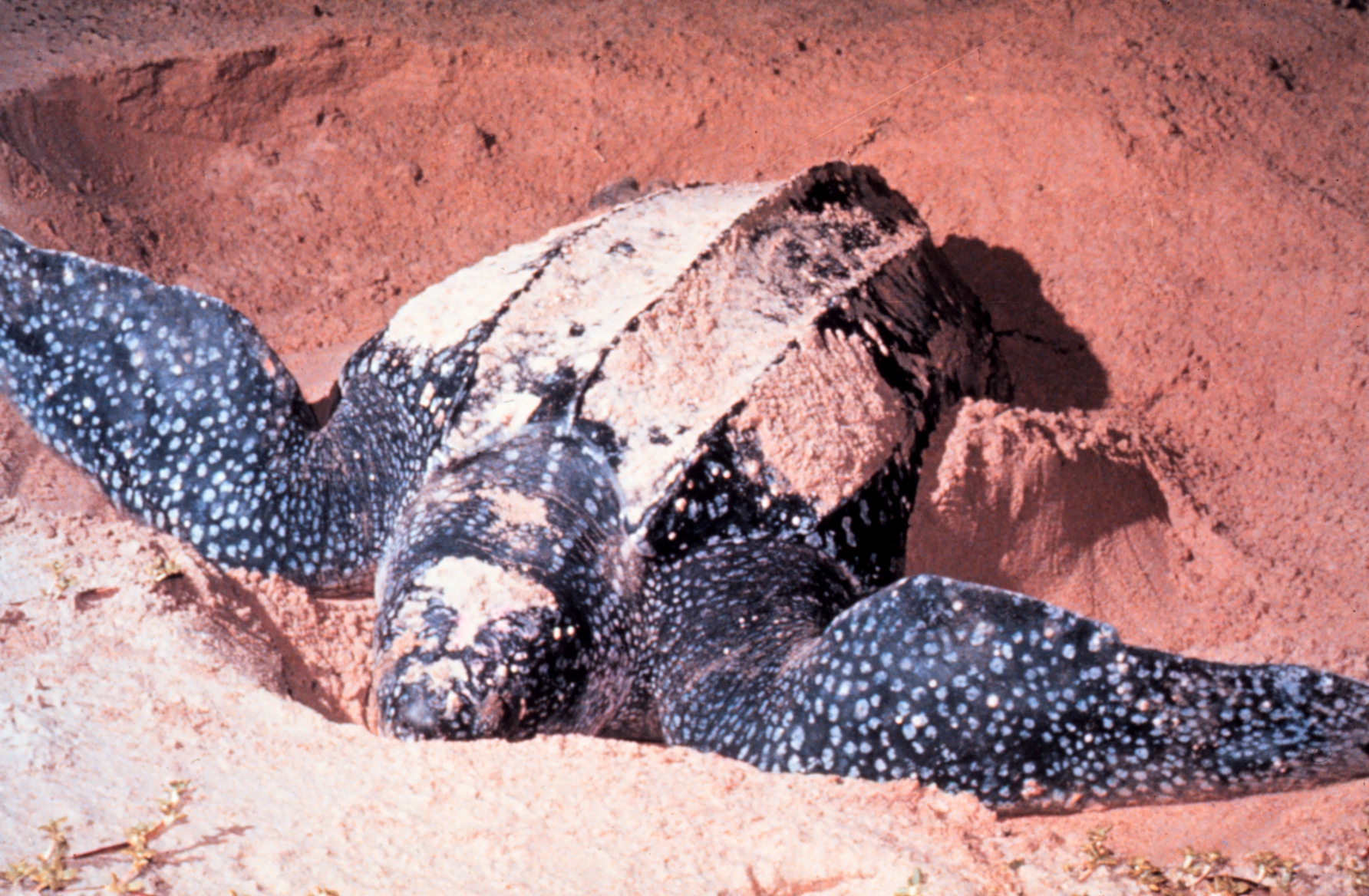
Tortoises (Testudinidae)
Species	Common name(s)	Notes	Image
Geochelone carbonaria	Red-footed tortoise	Present on Barbuda; probably extirpated from Antigua.
Scaly sea turtles (Cheloniidae)
Species	Common name(s)	Notes	Image
Caretta caretta	Loggerhead turtle	Endangered. Recorded in water only.
Chelonia mydas	Green turtle	Endangered. Recorded nesting on Antigua, Barbuda and some of the offshore Islands.
Eretmochelys imbricata	Hawksbill turtle	Critically endangered. Recorded nesting on Antigua, Barbuda and some of the offshore Islands.
Leathery sea turtles (Dermochelyidae)
Species	Common name(s)	Notes	Image
Dermochelys coriacea	Leatherback turtle	Critically endangered. Recorded nesting on Antigua and Barbuda

=== Lizards and snakes (Squamata) ===
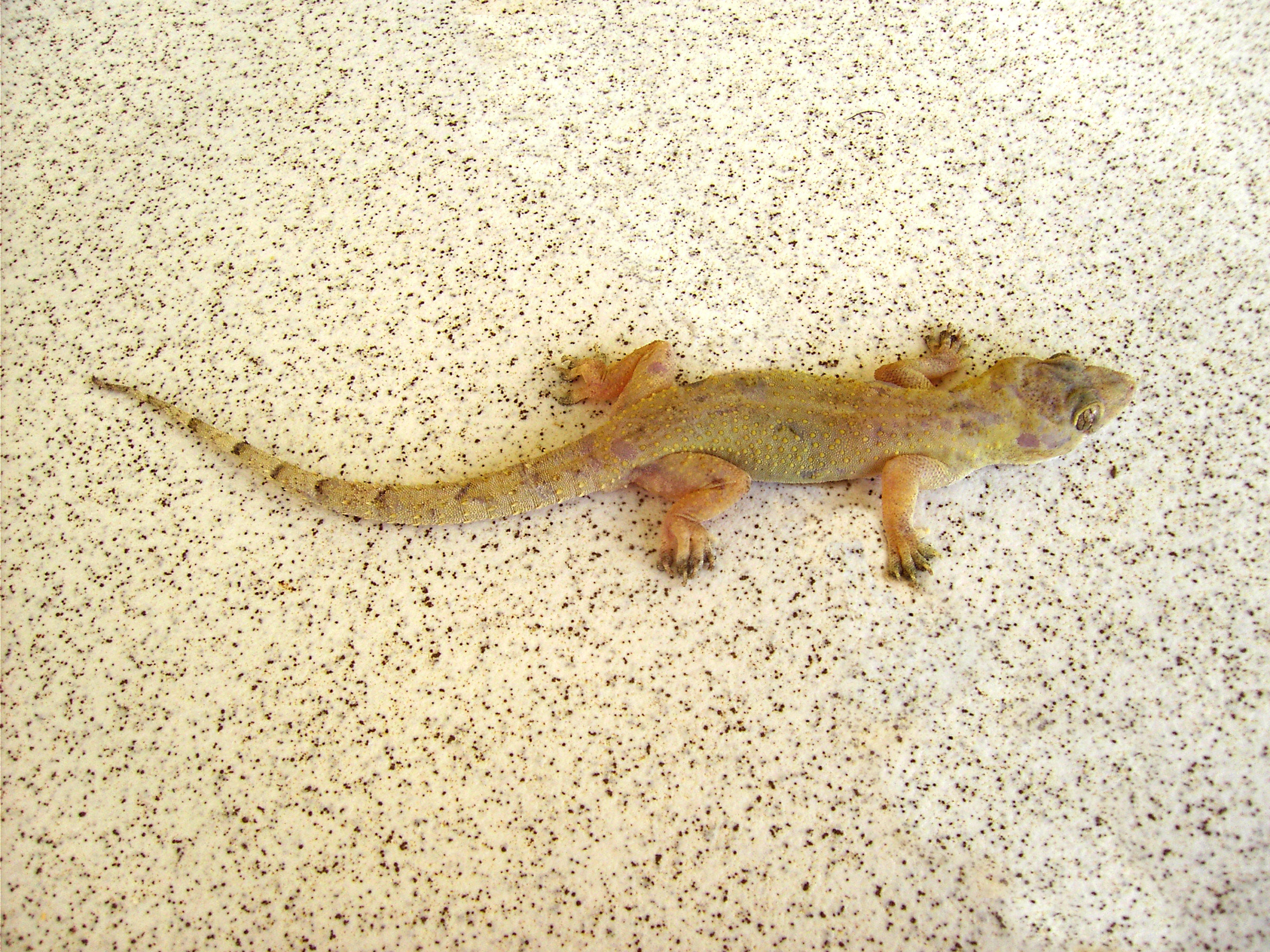
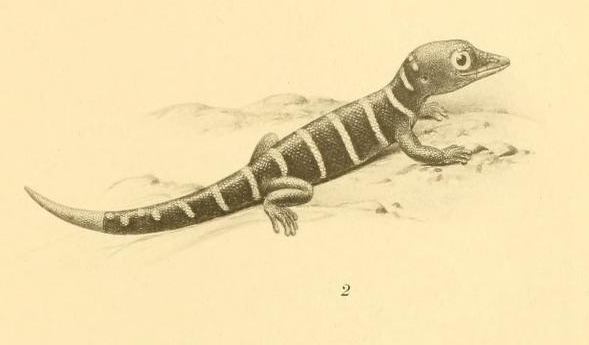
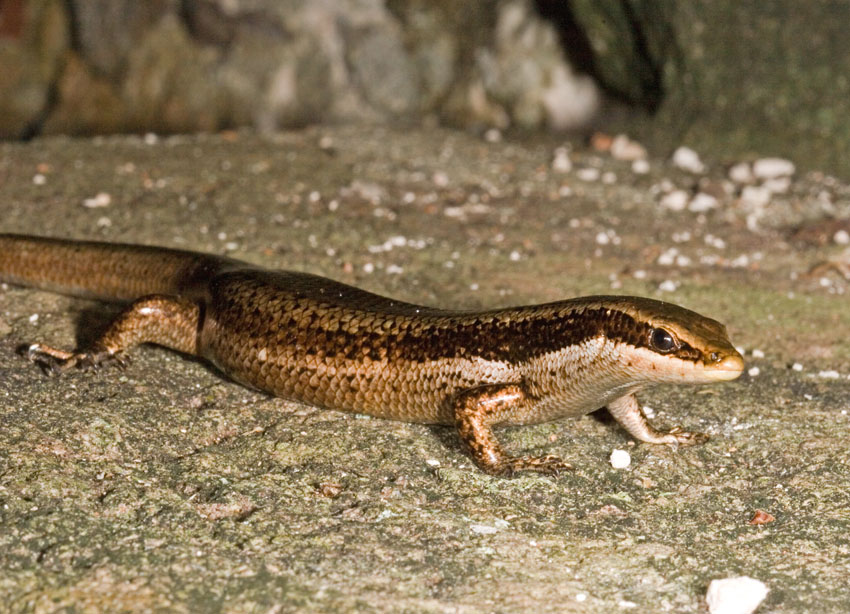
Geckos (Gekkonidae)
Species	Common name(s)	Notes	Image
Hemidactylus mabouia	House gecko	Introduced to Antigua.
Sphaerodactylus elegantulus	Antigua least gecko	Regional endemic; found on both main islands and some of the offshore islands.
Sphaerodactylus new species		Reported on Redonda, it is believed to be a separate species, but is yet to be described.
Thecadactylus rapicauda	Turnip-tailed gecko	Found on both main islands and some of the offshore islands.
Iguanas and Anolids (Iguanidae)
Species	Common name(s)	Notes	Image
Anolis forresti	Watts' anole	Taxonomy as separate species unclear; alternately described as a subspecies of A. wattsi. Endemic to Barbuda.
Anolis leachii	Leach's anole	Found on both main islands. Originally endemic; since introduced to Bermuda.
Anolis nubilis	Redonda anole	Endemic to Redonda.
Anolis wattsi	Watts' anole	Regional endemic. Found on Antigua; also introduced to Saint Lucia and Trinidad.
Whiptails (Teiidae)
Species	Common name(s)	Notes	Image
Pholidoscelis atratus	Redonda ameiva	Endemic to Redonda. sometimes described as subspecies of P. pluvianotatus.
Pholidoscelis griswoldi	Griswold's ameiva, Antiguan ameiva, Antiguan ground lizard	Endemic. Common on Barbuda; common only on offshore islands of Antigua.
Microteiids (Gymnophthalmidae)
Species	Common name(s)	Notes	Image
Gymnophthalmus underwoodi	Underwood's spectacled tegu	Found on Barbuda.
Skinks (Scincidae)
Species	Common name(s)	Notes	Image
Copeoglossum redondae		Found on Redonda (endemic).
Worm snakes (Typhlopidae)
Species	Common name(s)	Notes	Image
Typhlops monastus	Montserrat worm snake	Regional endemic; found on both main islands and some of the offshore islands.
Colubrids (Colubridae)
Species	Common name(s)	Notes	Image
Alsophis antiguae	Antiguan racer	Critically endangered. Endemic; found only on Great Bird Island off the coast of Antigua. Considered one of the rarest and most endangered snake species in the world; only 60-80 adults believed to remain.

== Disputed or unconfirmed species ==
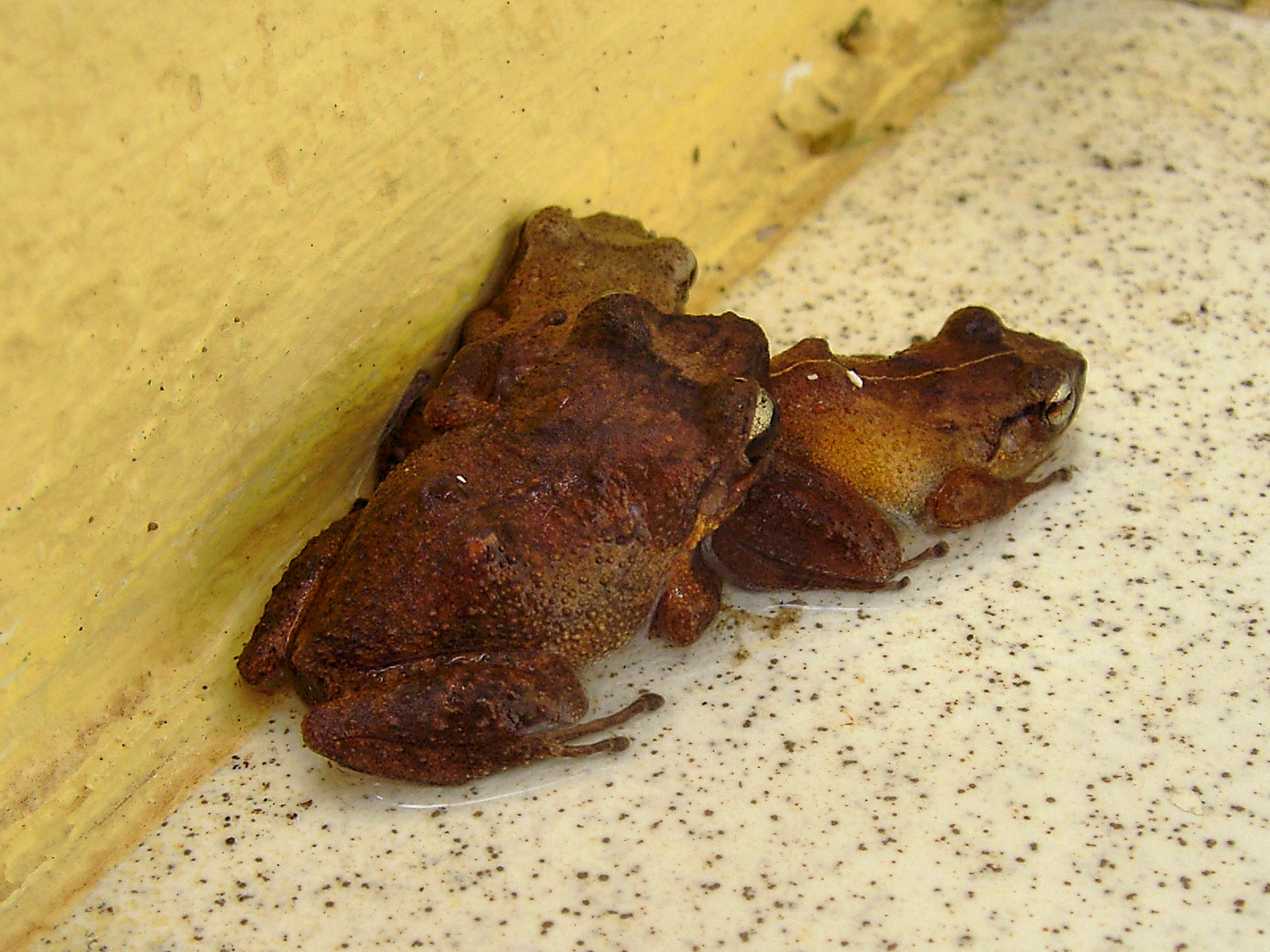
Species	Common name(s)	Notes	Image
Eleutherodactylus martinicensis	Tink frog, Martinique robber frog	Near threatened. Regional endemic. Occasionally recorded on Antigua, probably due to misidentification.
Leptotyphlops tenella	Guyana blind snake	Possibly on Antigua; mainly found in Trinidad and South America.

== Species by island ==
=== Amphibians ===
Family	Species	Antigua	Barbuda	Redonda
Hylidae	Osteopilus septentrionalis	X		
Leptodactylidae	Eleutherodactylus johnstonei	X	X	
Bufonidae	Bufo marinus	X		

=== Reptiles ===
Family	Species	Antigua	Barbuda	Redonda
Testudinidae	Geochelone carbonaria	X	X	
Cheloniidae	Caretta caretta	X	X	X
Cheloniidae	Chelonia mydas	X	X	X
Cheloniidae	Eretmochelys imbricata	X	X	X
Dermochelyidae	Dermochelys coriacea	X	X	X
Gekkonidae	Hemidactylus mabouia	X		
Gekkonidae	Sphaerodactylus elegantulus	X	X	
Gekkonidae	Sphaerodactylus new species			X
Gekkonidae	Thecadactylus rapicauda	X	X	
Iguanidae	Anolis forresti		X	
Iguanidae	Anolis leachii	X	X	
Iguanidae	Anolis nubilis			X
Iguanidae	Anolis wattsi	X		
Teiidae	Pholidoscelis atratus			X
Teiidae	Pholidoscelis griswoldi	X	X	
Scincidae	Copeoglossum redondae			X
Gymnophthalmidae	Gymnophthalmus underwoodi		X	
Typhlopidae	Leptotyphlops tenella	?		
Typhlopidae	Typhlops monastus	X	X	
Colubridae	Alsophis antiguae	X		
