= Montserrat ameiva =

Conservation status
- Near Threatened (IUCN 3.1)

Scientific classification
- Kingdom: Animalia
- Phylum: Chordata
- Class: Reptilia
- Order: Squamata
- Family: Teiidae
- Genus: Pholidoscelis
- Species: P. pluvianotatus

Binomial name
- Pholidoscelis pluvianotatus (Garman, 1887)

Synonyms
- Ameiva pluvianotata Garman, 1887; Ameiva pluvianotata pluvianotata

Species of lizard

The Montserrat ameiva (Pholidoscelis pluvianotatus), also known as the Montserrat ground lizard, is a lizard species in the genus Pholidoscelis. It is found on the Caribbean island of Montserrat in the Lesser Antilles.

== Description ==
The species is variable in color and pattern. The dorsal surface on males is reddish or gray-tan, with black speckling and lighter marbling; or it is dull green with slight markings and a dark blue head. The male's ventral surface is dull gray, and it has blue-gray spots on its upper thighs and sides of its tail. Females have a gray dorsal surface and a bluish underside. It is covered with light, widespread spots on its back, sides, legs, and tail. The flanks on females are dull green, sometimes with brown stripes present.

== Taxonomy ==
The Montserrat ameiva was described in 1887 by American herpetologist Samuel Garman (1843–1927) as Ameiva pluvianotata. In 2016, the species was moved to Pholidoscelis based on genetic sequencing and phylogenetic analyses.

The Redonda ground lizard is sometimes considered a subspecies of the Montserrat ameiva, though it is currently accepted as a separate species, Pholidoscelis atratus, in The Reptile Database. The Redonda ground lizard is found only on the uninhabited island of Redonda, which is within the jurisdiction of Antigua and Barbuda (though geographically closer to Montserrat). The Redonda ground lizard is darkly colored, similar to the Sombrero ameiva and Censky's ameiva that also live on small and barren Caribbean islands.

== Conservation ==
The Montserrat ameiva is endemic to the island Montserrat. Although it was formerly widespread across Montserrat, its populations, as with other wildlife on the island, have declined significantly since the Soufrière Hills volcano became active in 1995, with at least a third of its habitat destroyed. The lizard is also threatened by development, including forest habitat destruction, and invasive species. Because of the extent of its habitat destruction, it is listed as a near threatened species on the IUCN Red List.
