= List of amphibians and reptiles of Montserrat =

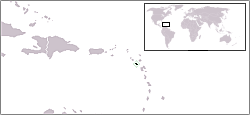
Location of Montserrat in the Caribbean

This is a list of amphibians and reptiles found in the British overseas territory of Montserrat, located in the Caribbean Lesser Antilles. The continuing eruptions of the Soufrière Hills volcano have devastated much of the island.

== Amphibians ==
There are three species of amphibian on Montserrat, one of which was introduced.

=== Frogs (Anura) ===
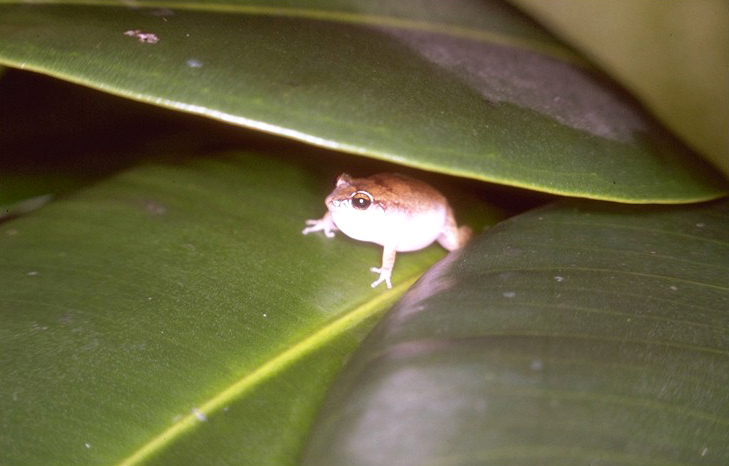
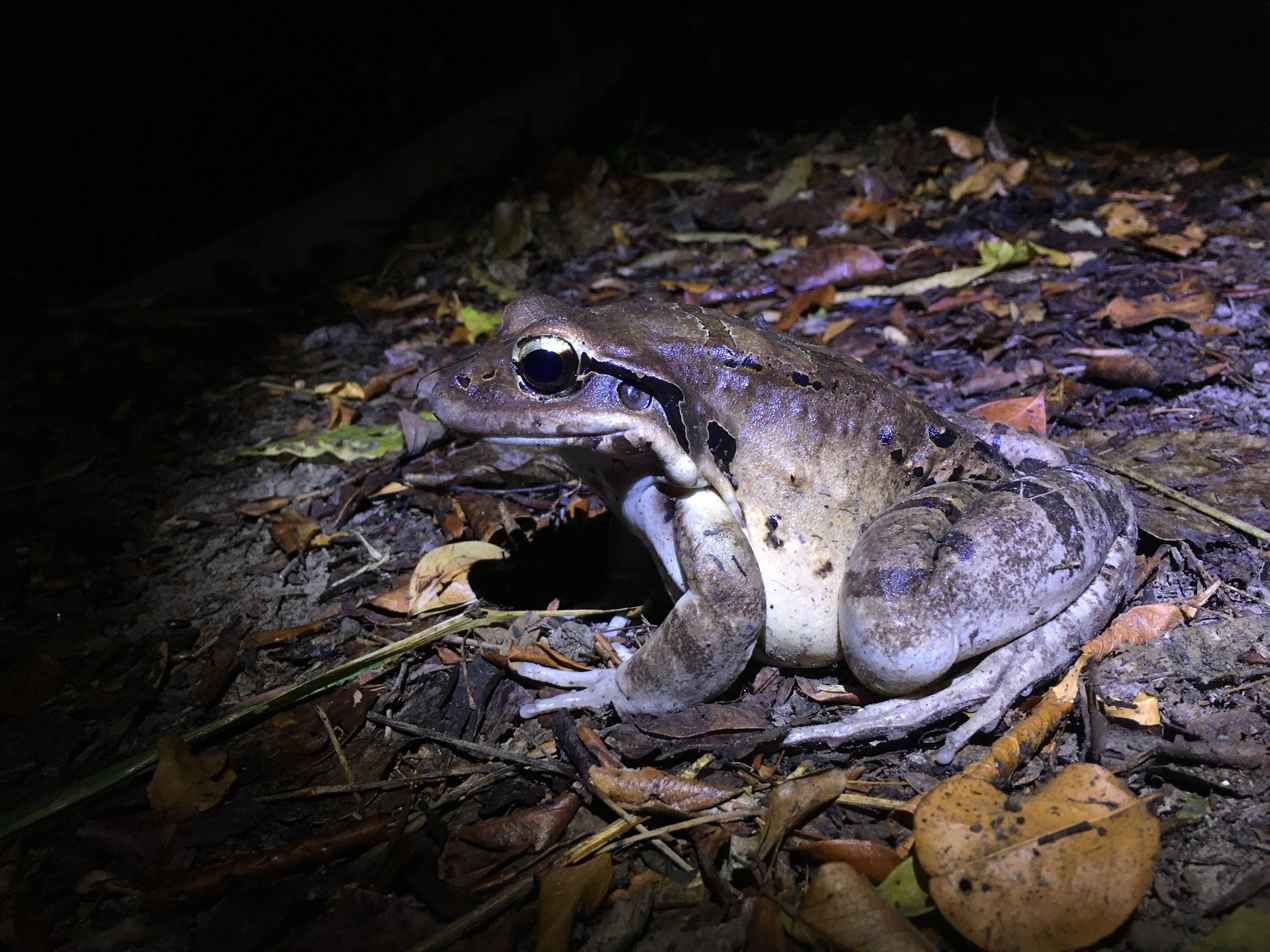
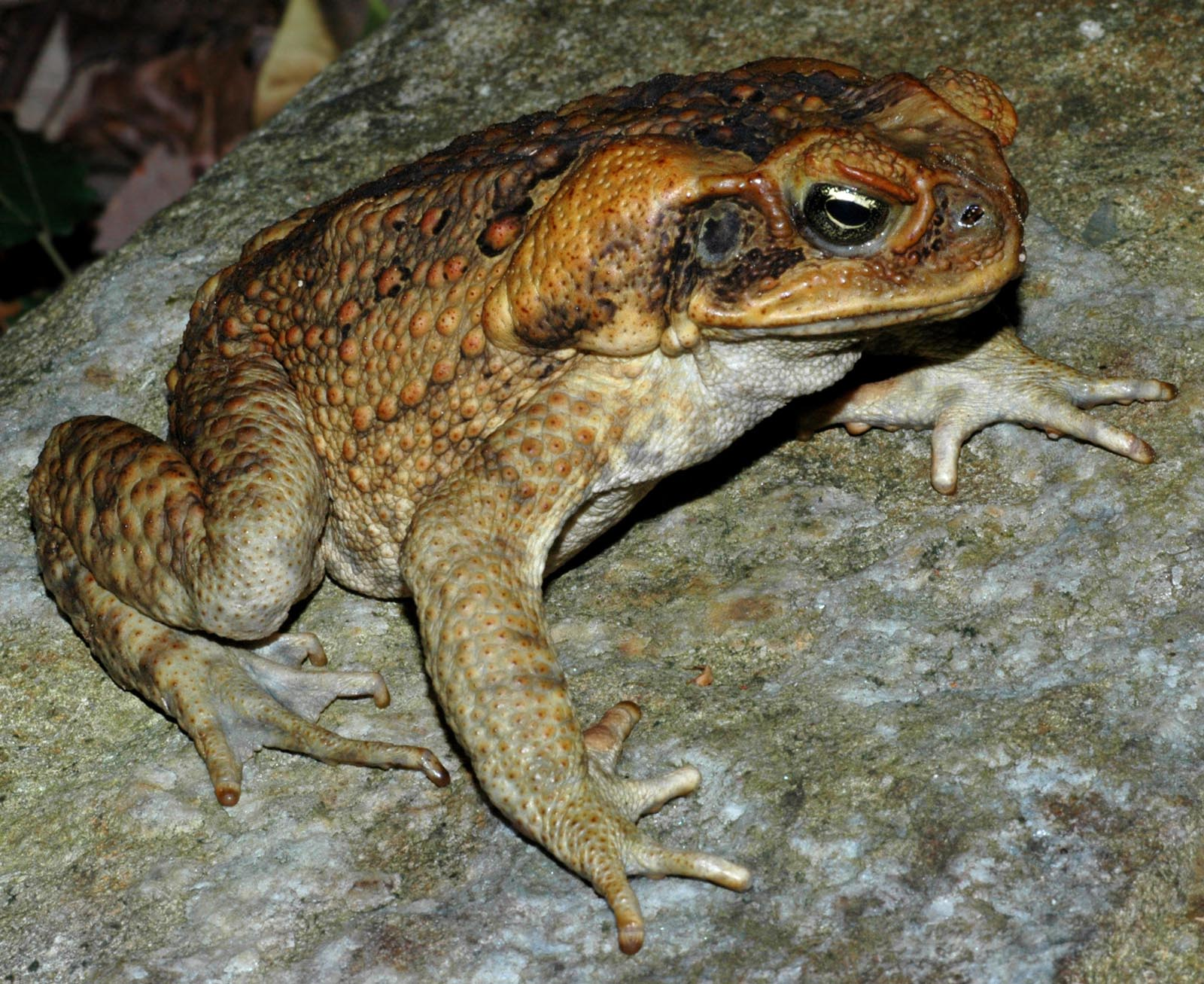
Tropical frogs (Leptodactylidae)
Species	Common name(s)	Notes	Image
Eleutherodactylus johnstonei	Lesser Antillean whistling frog, coqui Antillano, Johnstone's whistling frog	Least concern. Abundant.
Leptodactylus fallax	Giant ditch frog, mountain chicken	Critically endangered. Regional endemic; extant only on Montserrat and Dominica. Volcanic activity from the late 1990s through 2012 caused habitat destruction, coupled with the arrival of Batrachochytrium dendrobatidis in 2009, decimating the population.
True toads (Bufonidae)
Species	Common name(s)	Notes	Image
Bufo marinus	Cane toad, giant neotropical toad, marine toad	Least concern. Introduced. Abundant.

== Reptiles ==
Including marine turtles and introduced species, there are 15 reptile species on Montserrat. Two are endemic: the Plymouth anole (Anolis lividus) and the Montserrat galliwasp (Diploglossus montisserrati).

=== Turtles (Testudines) ===
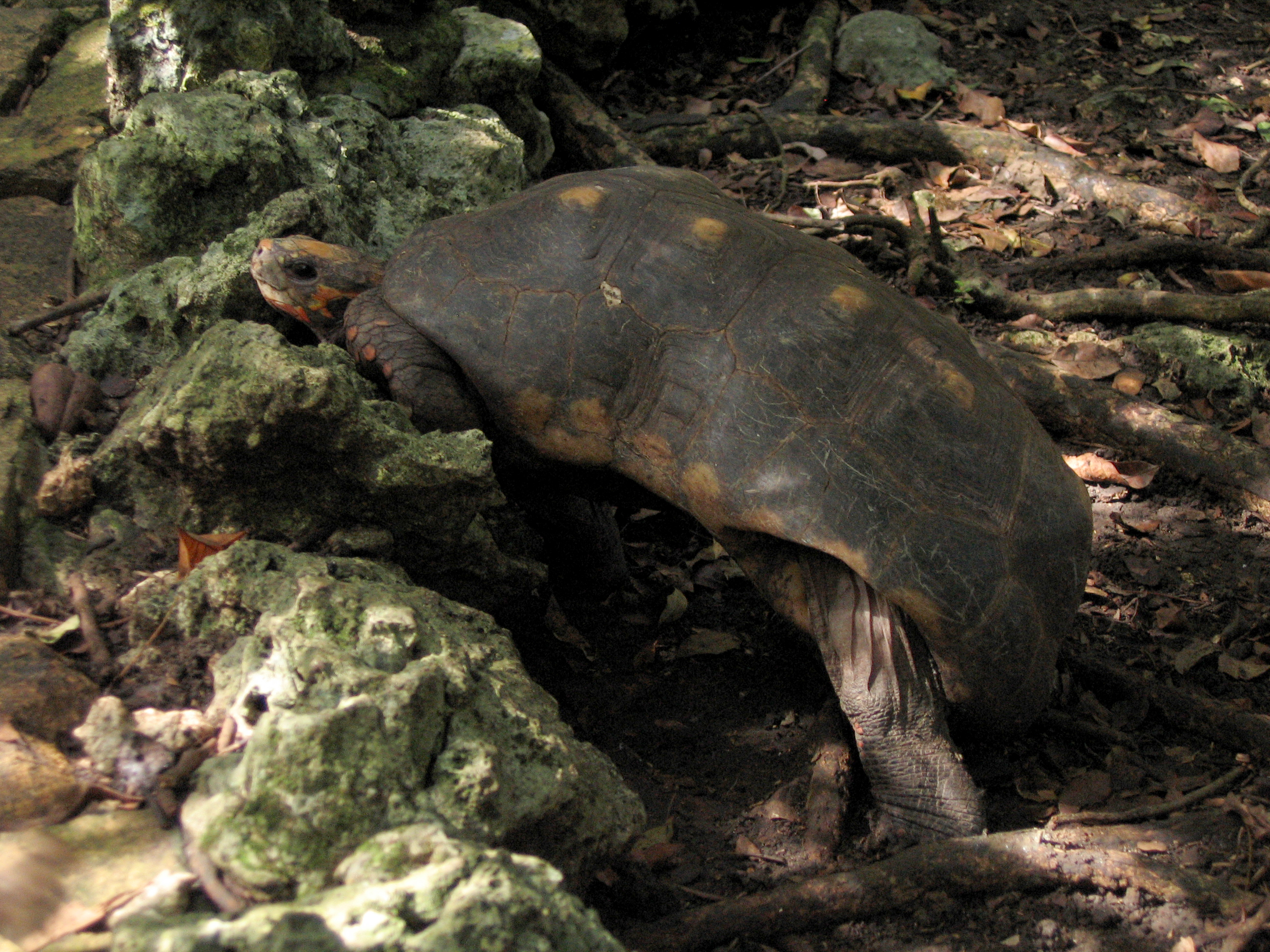
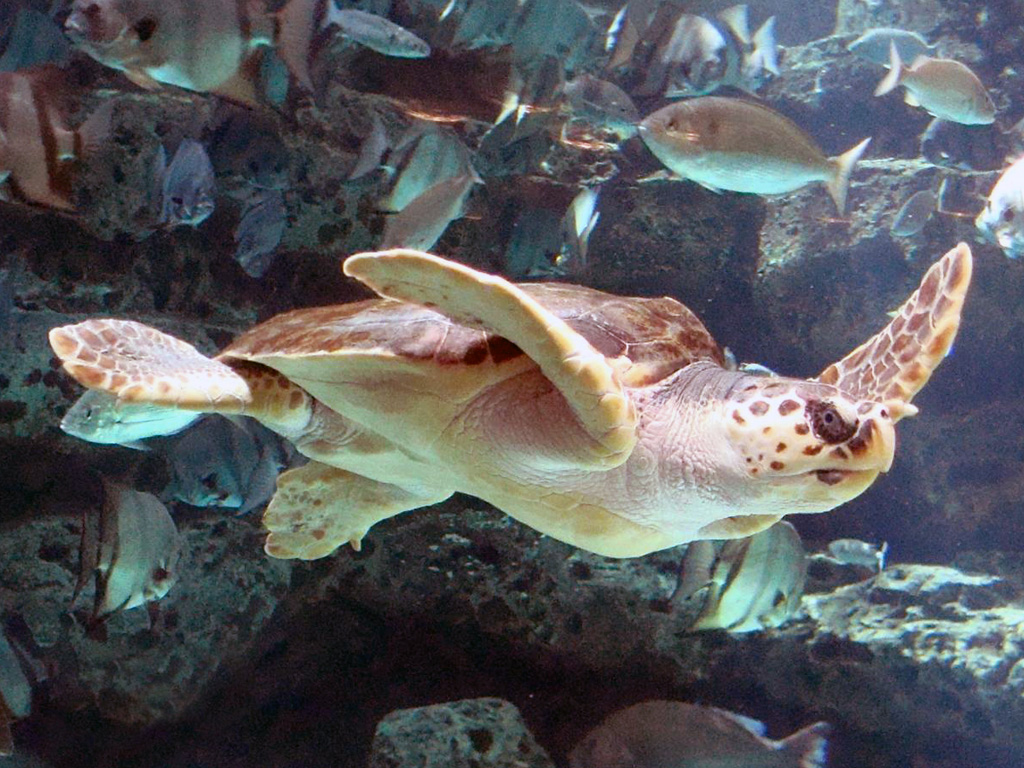
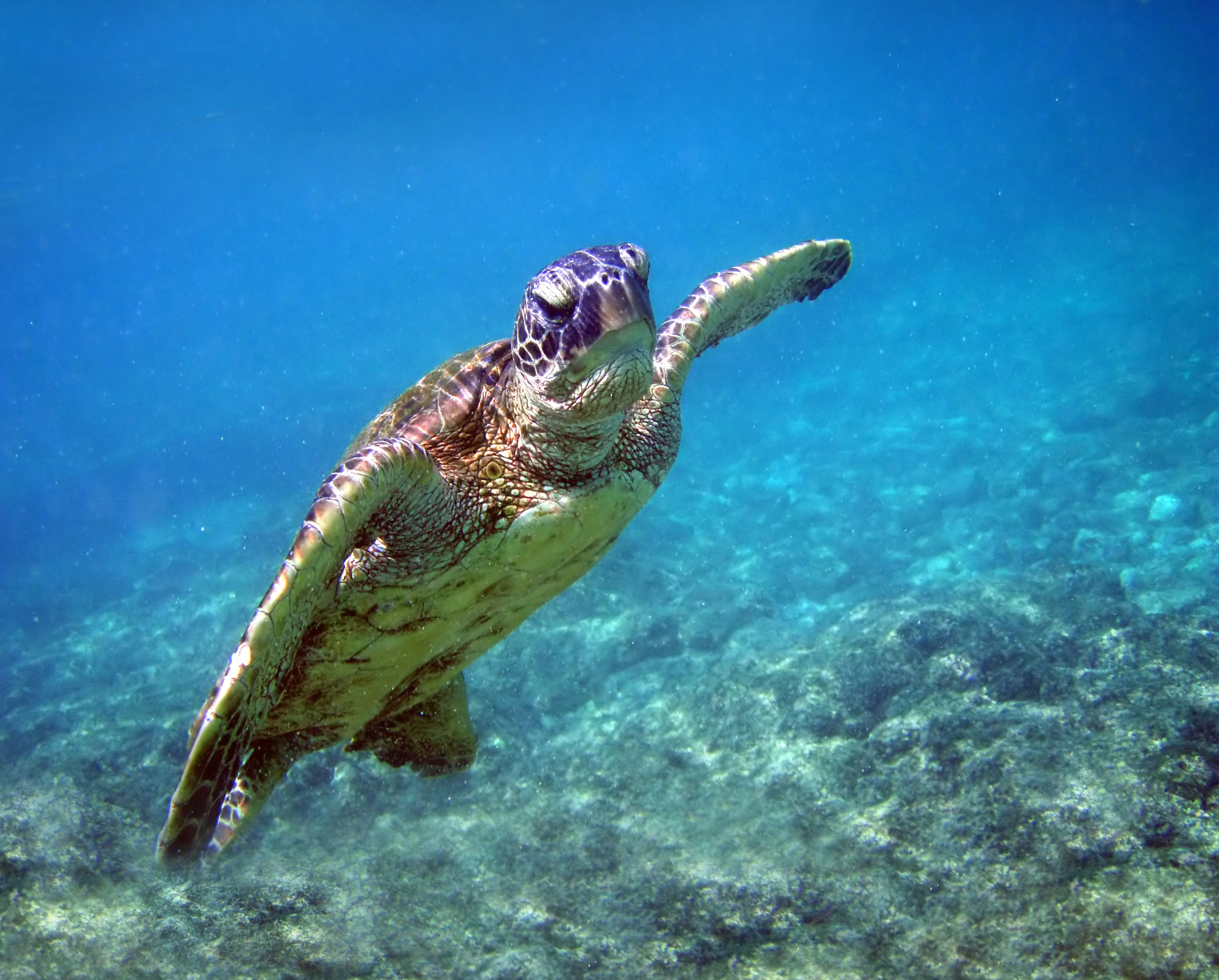
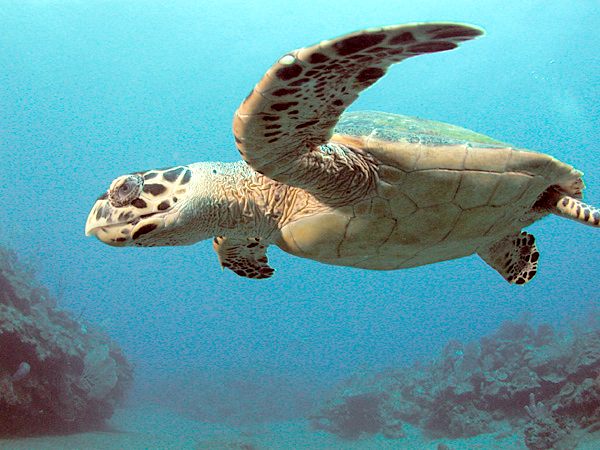
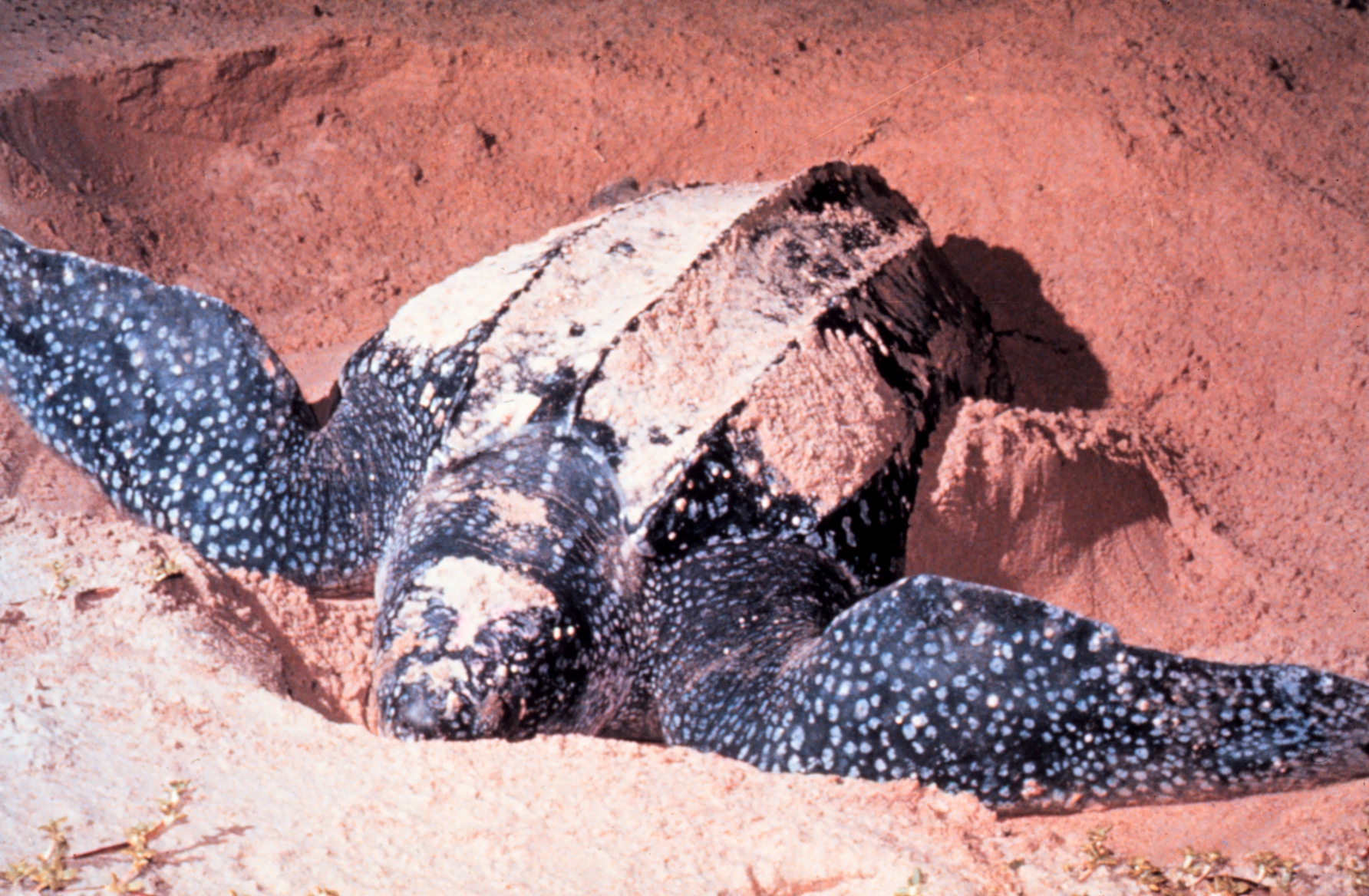
Tortoises (Testudinidae)
Species	Common name(s)	Notes	Image
Geochelone carbonaria	Red-footed tortoise
Scaly sea turtles (Cheloniidae)
Species	Common name(s)	Notes	Image
Caretta caretta	Loggerhead turtle	Endangered. Very rarely recorded around Montserrat. Not recorded nesting on Montserrat.
Chelonia mydas	Green turtle	Endangered. Resident in waters around Montserrat. Recorded nesting.
Eretmochelys imbricata	Hawksbill turtle	Critically endangered. Relatively common year-round. Recorded nesting.
Leathery sea turtles (Dermochelyidae)
Species	Common name(s)	Notes	Image
Dermochelys coriacea	Leatherback turtle	Critically endangered. Rarely recorded in Montserrat waters or nesting.

=== Lizards and snakes (Squamata) ===
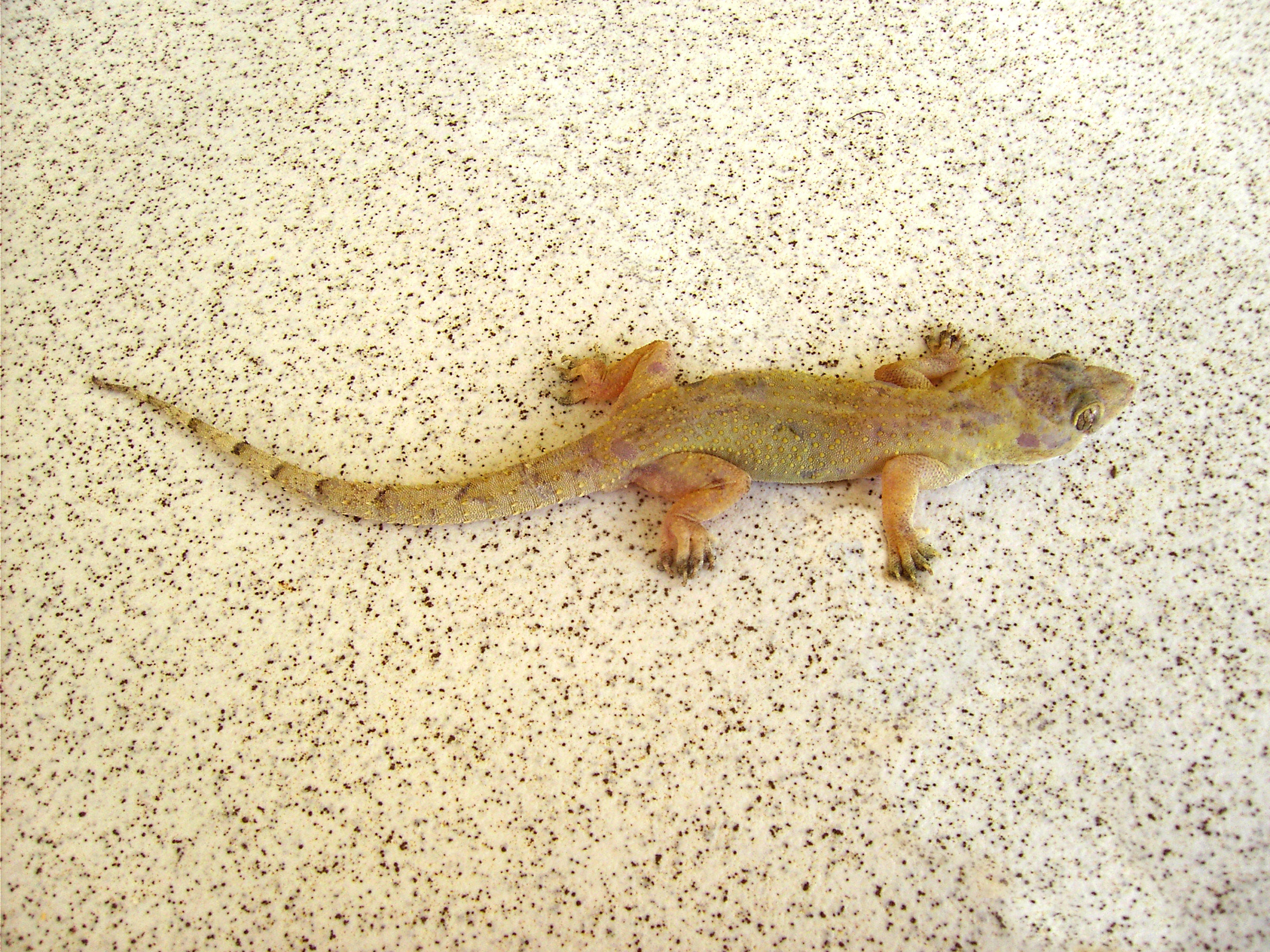
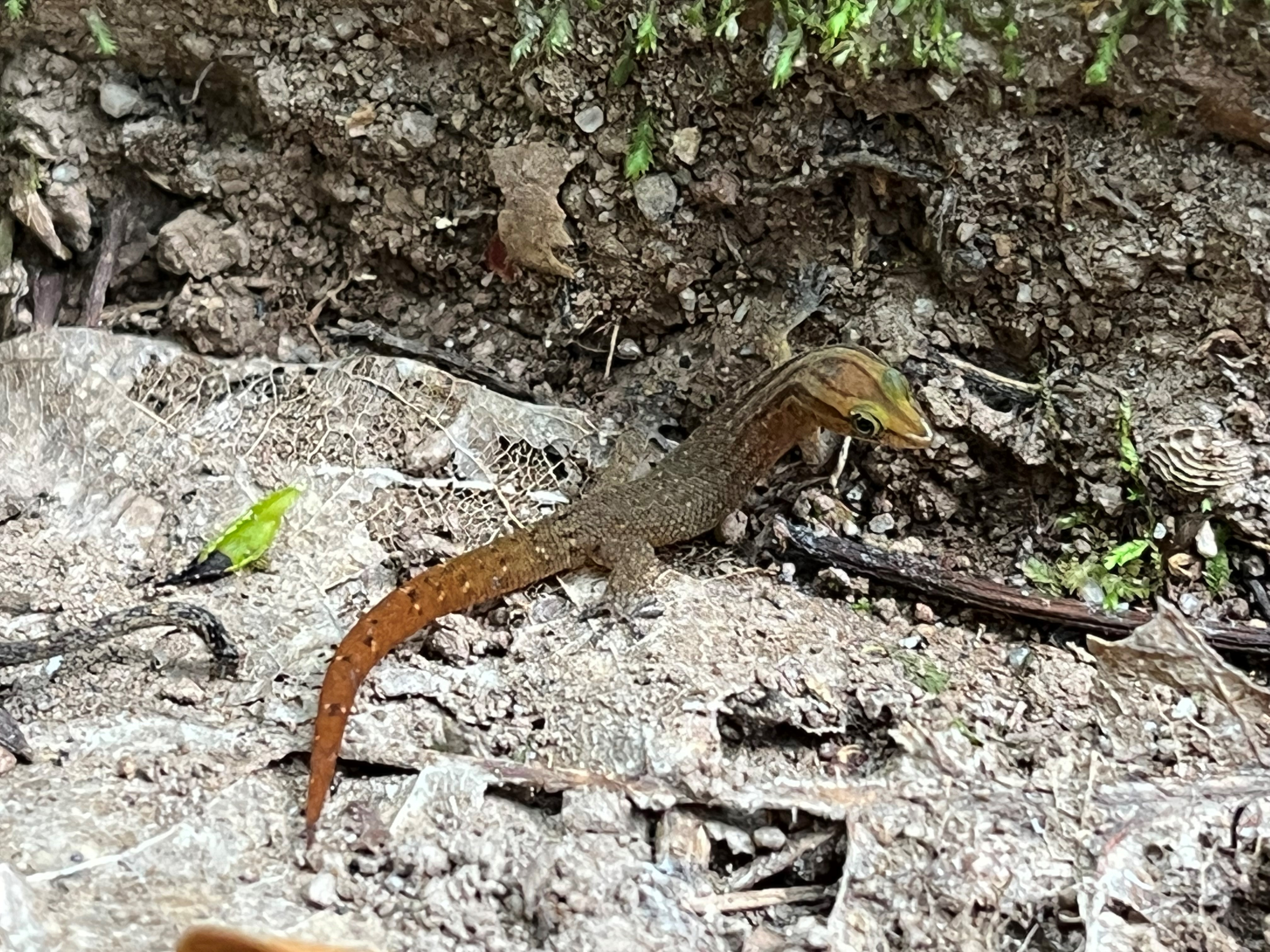
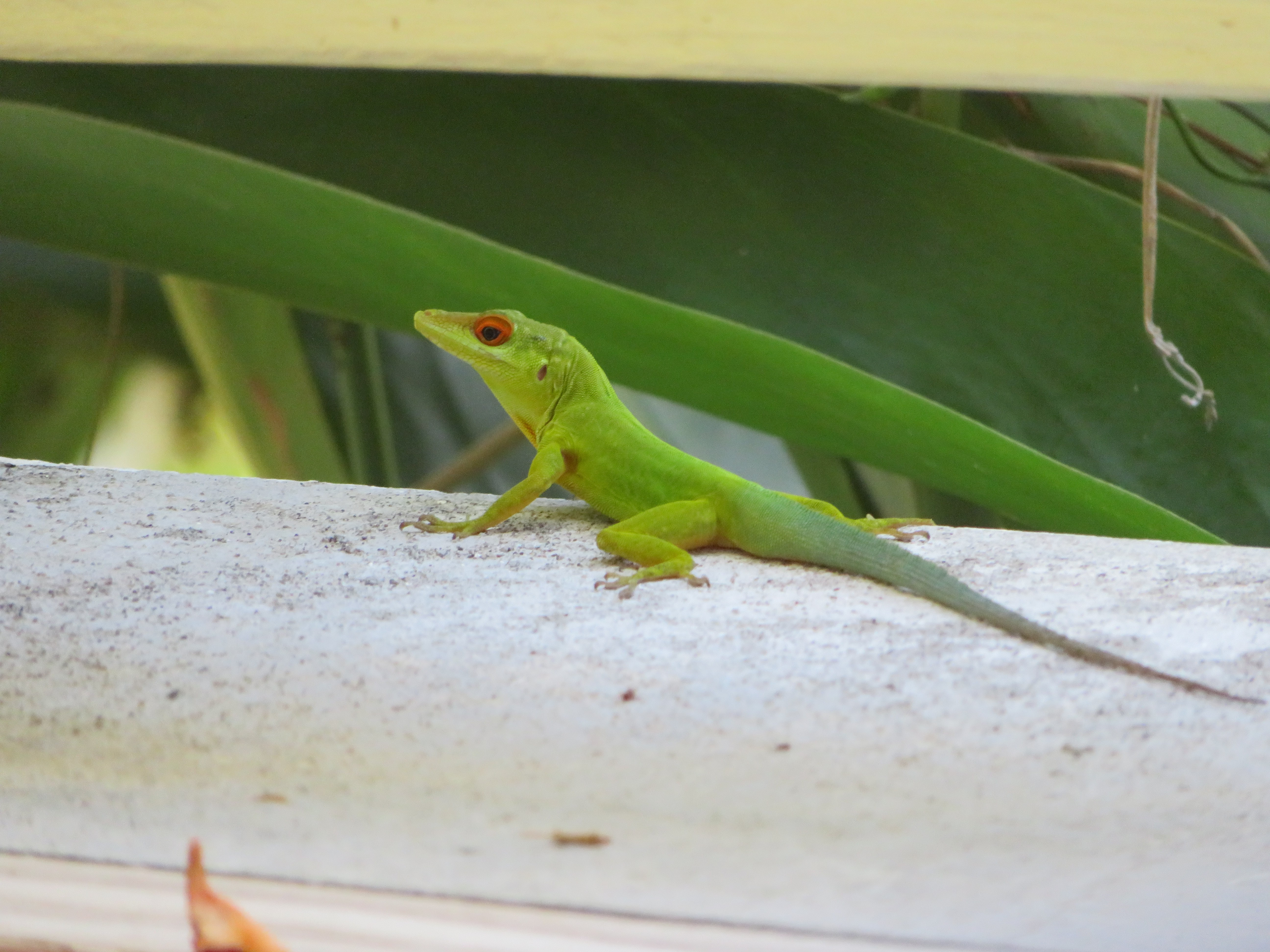
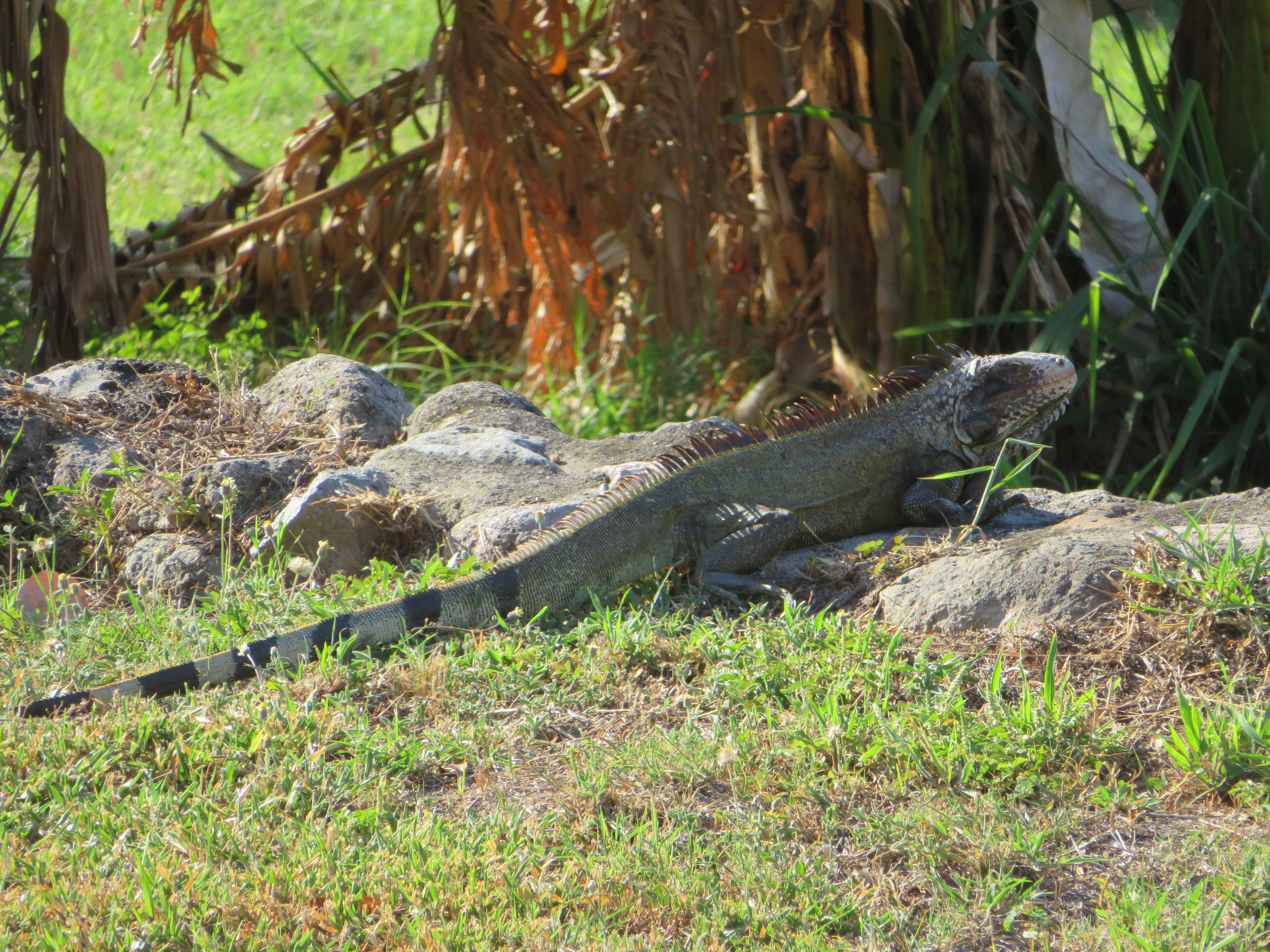
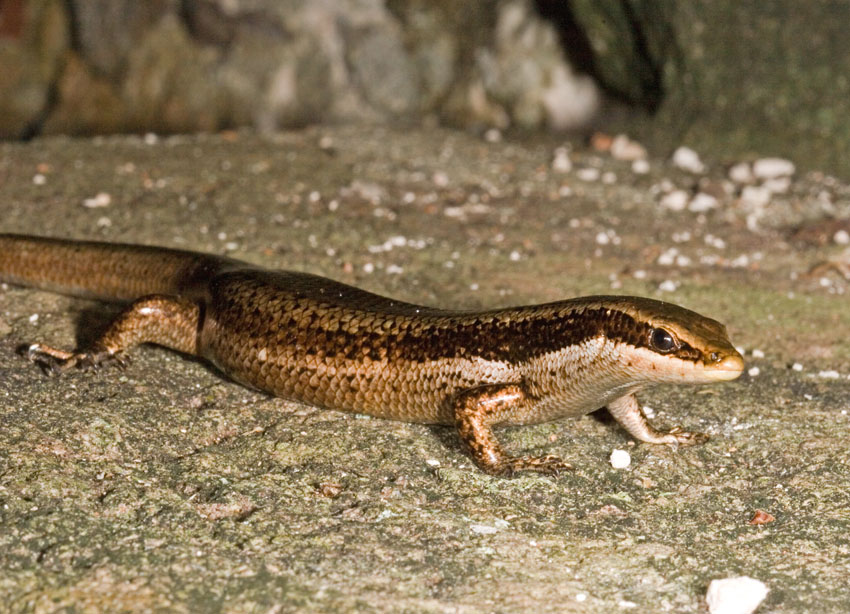
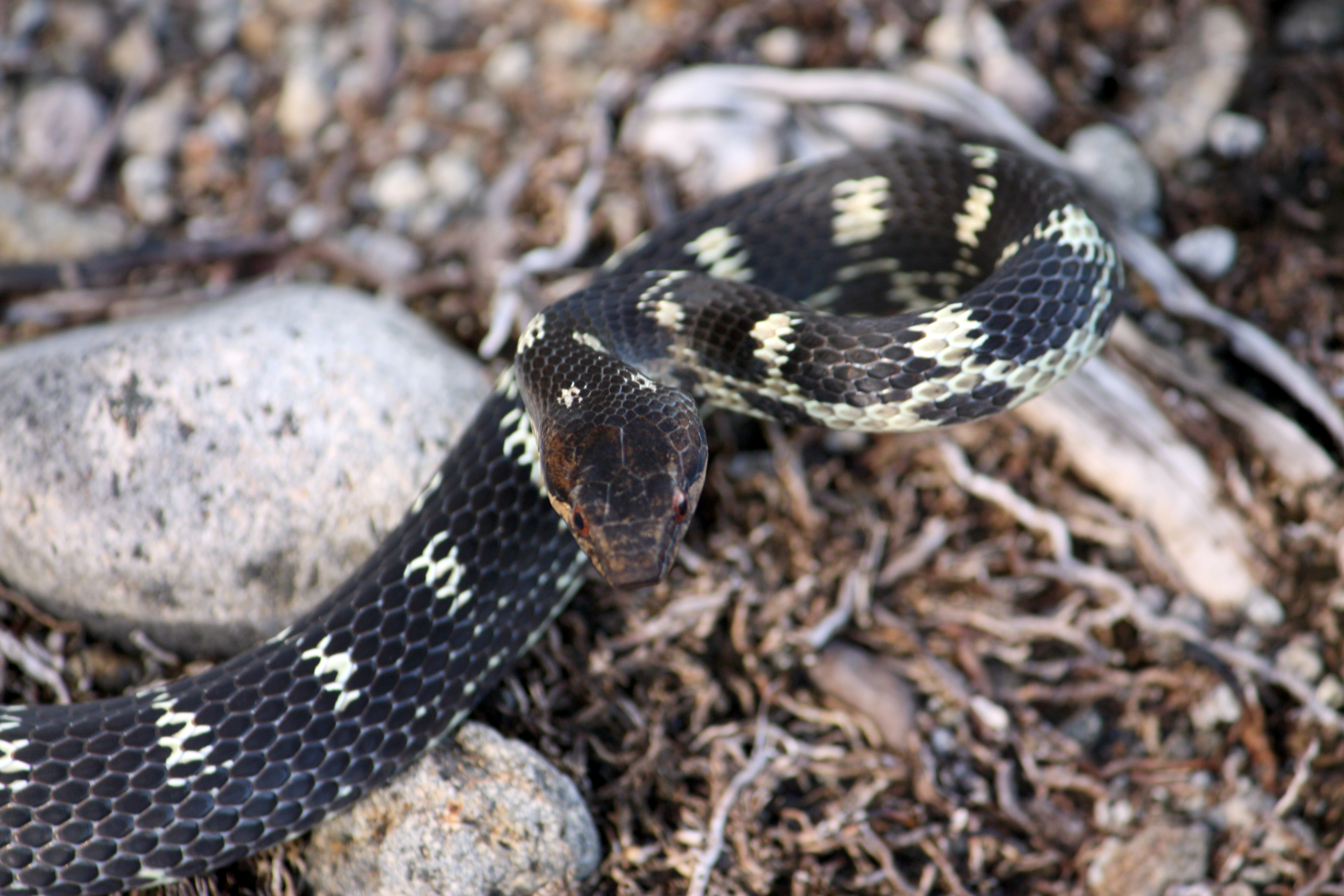
Geckos (Gekkonidae)
Species	Common name(s)	Notes	Image
Hemidactylus mabouia	House gecko	Introduced.
Sphaerodactylus fantasticus	Fantastic least gecko
Thecadactylus rapicauda	Turnip-Tailed Gecko
Iguanas and anolids (Iguanidae)
Species	Common name(s)	Notes	Image
Anolis lividus	Plymouth anole	Endemic. Widespread and frequently abundant.
Iguana iguana melanoderma	Saban black iguana	Regionally endemic to Montserrat and Saba. No current evidence of green iguana. The Saban black iguana is darker coloured than the other subspecies of green iguana, with colouration deepening in older individuals. It possesses a noticeable black patch between the eye and tympanum.
Whiptails (Teiidae)
Species	Common name(s)	Notes	Image
Pholidoscelis pluvianotatus	Montserrat ameiva	Regional endemic. Numbers have declined significantly due to volcanic activity.
Glass lizards and alligator lizards (Anguidae)
Species	Common name(s)	Notes	Image
Diploglossus montisserrati	Montserrat galliwasp	Critically endangered. Endemic. Known from only one specimen collected in 1964 until it was re-found in 1998. Most recently sighted in 2018.
Skinks (Scincidae)
Species	Common name(s)	Notes	Image
Mabuya mabouya		Regional endemic. Rare.
Worm snakes (Typhlopidae)
Species	Common name(s)	Notes	Image
Typhlops monastus	Montserrat worm snake	Regional endemic; populations found on Saint Kitts and Nevis are of subspecies T. m. geotomus.
Colubrids (Colubridae)
Species	Common name(s)	Notes	Image
Alsophis antillensis	Antilles racer, island racer, leeward racer	Regional endemic. Widespread.
