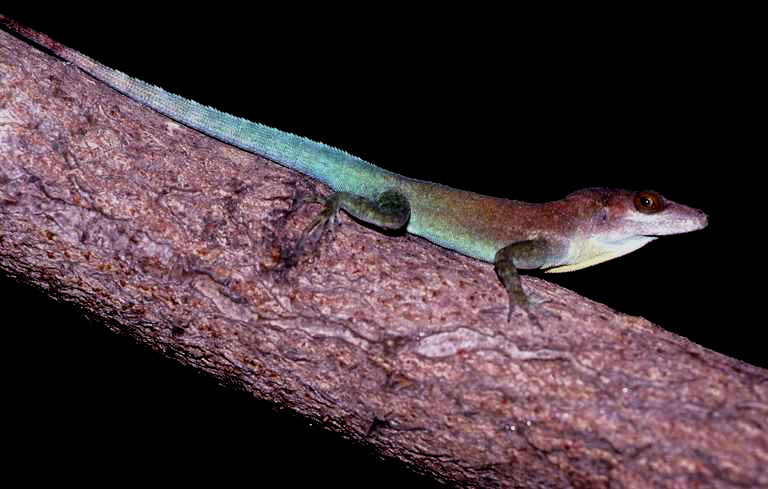

Conservation status
- Near Threatened (IUCN 3.1)

Scientific classification
- Kingdom: Animalia
- Phylum: Chordata
- Class: Reptilia
- Order: Squamata
- Suborder: Iguania
- Family: Dactyloidae
- Genus: Anolis
- Species: A. lividus

Binomial name
- Anolis lividus Garman, 1887

= Anolis lividus =

Species of lizard

Anolis lividus, the Plymouth anole or Montserrat anole, is a species of anole lizard that is endemic to the island of Montserrat in the Caribbean Lesser Antilles. It is widespread and abundant in many areas.

Individuals vary widely in appearance. Males can be grass-green or yellow-green, and may be plain or with lighter blue speckling towards the anterior, and a rust-red tint over the head and limbs. Others are olive-green or gray, with widespread pale spots. Males in populations on the northern end of the island have prominent black spots on their necks. Females are duller and more brown, with a mid-dorsal stripe or ladder pattern and a light flank stripe.

== See also ==
- List of amphibians and reptiles of Montserrat
- List of Anolis lizards
