= Copeoglossum redondae =

Conservation status
- Extinct (IUCN 3.1)

Scientific classification
- Kingdom: Animalia
- Phylum: Chordata
- Class: Reptilia
- Order: Squamata
- Family: Scincidae
- Genus: Copeoglossum
- Species: †C. redondae

Binomial name
- †Copeoglossum redondae Hedges & Conn, 2012

Species of lizard

Copeoglossum redondae, the Redonda skink, was a species of skink found on Redonda in Antigua and Barbuda, and Barbados. It is now considered extinct.

== Taxonomy ==
The Redonda skink was formally as Copeoglossum redondae described by the American ecologists Stephen Hedges and Caitlin Conn in 2012 based on a female specimen collected on Redonda between 1863 and 1873. The species is named after the island.

== Description ==
The only known specimen, a female, measured 100.1 cm long.

== Distribution and habitat ==
The skink was endemic to the small Caribbean island of Redonda, a dependency of Antigua and Barbuda with an area of around two square kilometers. While it was alive, it probably inhabited rocks and leaf litter in the open dry forests native to Redonda. The introduction of rats and goats to the island led to the almost complete elimination of vegetation there.

== Conservation ==
The Redonda skink was one of six species of lizards endemic to the island, three of which, including the skink, are now extinct. The skink was driven to extinction by the destruction of nearly all its preferred habitat on the island, initially for guano mining and afterwards by the proliferation of introduced goats, which stripped the island of nearly all its native vegetation. Intensive surveys conducted on the island in the 2010s for the surviving species of lizards failed to find any evidence of the Redonda skink, making it probable that the species is now extinct. Recent conservation efforts to protect the remaining endemic lizards have seen vegetation on the island recover rapidly, after goats and rats were extirpated in 2017.
