= Censky's ameiva =

Conservation status
- Endangered (IUCN 3.1)

Scientific classification
- Kingdom: Animalia
- Phylum: Chordata
- Class: Reptilia
- Order: Squamata
- Family: Teiidae
- Subfamily: Teiinae
- Genus: Pholidoscelis
- Species: P. corax

Binomial name
- Pholidoscelis corax (Censky & Paulson, 1992)

Synonyms
- Ameiva corax Censky & Paulson, 1992

Species of reptile

Censky's ameiva (Pholidoscelis corax), also known as the Little Scrub Island ground lizard, is a species of lizard in the family Teiidae. It is endemic to Little Scrub Island, Anguilla.

== Taxonomy ==
The first description of Pholidoscelis corax was published in 1992, under the name Ameiva corax, by Ellen Joan Censky, who the common name is in reference to, and Dennis Roy Paulson. In 2016, the species was moved to Pholidoscelis based on genetic sequencing and phylogenetic analyses.

== Description and behaviour ==
P. corax is a melanistic species, superficially similar in its dark coloration and scalation to Pholidoscelis atratus and Pholidoscelis corvinus, other species also found on small, barren Caribbean islands. This is believed to be due to independent adaptation to the similar local environments.

P.corax forms social networks, and engages in social foraging. When an individual forages a food item that is too large for it to consume on its own, such as a bird egg or a fruit, it makes a non-aggressive display to invite nearby individuals to share the food. Experiments have also shown that individuals display similar behaviour upon finding novel non-edible objects. A 2015 (Note: Study conducted in 2015, results published in 2016.) study found that individual involvement in the social network of P. corax varies greatly, with 31% of observed individuals not seen associating with any other individuals, while others engaged with up to 22% of the individuals inside of the study area. The study found a positive correlation between size and how central an individual was to the social network.

== Distributione ==
P. corax is endemic to the tiny islet of Little Scrub, off the coast of Scrub Island, Anguilla.

== Conservation ==
P. corax is listed as endangered on the IUCN Red List due to its small population (estimated at 250 mature adults) and extremely limited distribution/habitat, an area less than 0.049 km^{2} (12 acres) in size. It is likely vulnerable to development, invasive mammal introduction, seasonal loss of vegetation during hurricanes, and declining seabird numbers (a food source).
