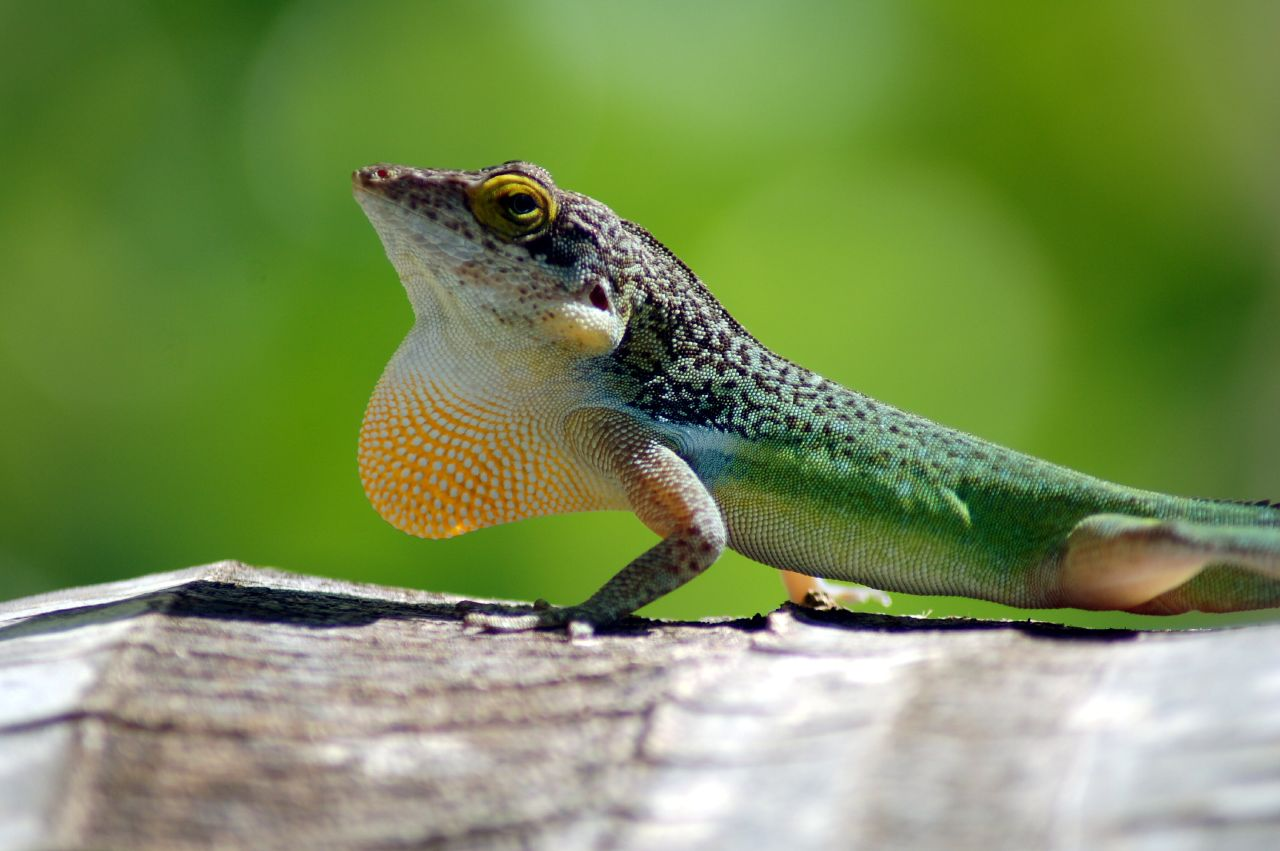

Conservation status
- Least Concern (IUCN 3.1)

Scientific classification
- Kingdom: Animalia
- Phylum: Chordata
- Class: Reptilia
- Order: Squamata
- Suborder: Iguania
- Family: Dactyloidae
- Genus: Anolis
- Species: A. leachii

Binomial name
- Anolis leachii A.M.C. Duméril & Bibron, 1837

Synonyms
- Anolis leachii A.M.C. Duméril & Bibron, 1837; Anolis bimaculatus leachii — Underwood in E. Williams et al., 1959; Anolis bimaculatus leachi — Lazell, 1972; Anolis leachi — Burnell & Hedges, 1990

= Anolis leachii =

Species of reptile

Anolis leachii, known commonly as the Antigua Bank tree anole, Barbuda Bank tree anole, panther anole or Leach's anole, is a species of lizard in the family Dactyloidae. The species is endemic to the Caribbean, and native to Antigua and Barbuda.

== Taxonomy ==
The first description of Anolis leachii was published in 1837 by André Marie Constant Duméril and Gabriel Bibron, in the 4th edition of Érpetologie générale.The specific name, leachii, is in honor of English zoologist William Elford Leach.

== Description and behaviour ==
A. leachii is light bright green, with the colour fading into a greyish brown down the length of the tail. The head is grey to brown, with a yellowish orange dewlap and dark brown to black speckling or mottling; in some individuals this speckling or mottling extends down the shoulders and across their whole backs.

A. leachii is diurnal oviparous.

== Distribution ==
A. leachii is native to Antigua and Barbuda, but has been introduced to and is widespread in Bermuda, and has also been introduced to Saint Thomas, US Virgin Islands and Montserrat. An effort to eradicate the species from Saint Thomas was undertaken in 2015, but photographic evidence indicates it may have been unsuccessful. The fate of the Montserrat population after the 1995 Soufrière Hills eruption that destroyed much of the island is unknown. In its 2015 assessment of the species the IUCN listed it as being of least concern.

== Habitat ==
A.leachii is an arboreal species that can live in both xeric and mesic habitats. Its natural habitats are forest and shrubland, but its also known to inhabit habitats that have been disturbed by human activity, such as pastures and sugarcane farms; one requirement for the anole to inhabit a place is that there exists vertical surfaces for it to perch on.

=== Sympatry ===
A. leachii coexists with the smaller anoles A. wattsi on Antigua, and A. forresti on Barbuda.

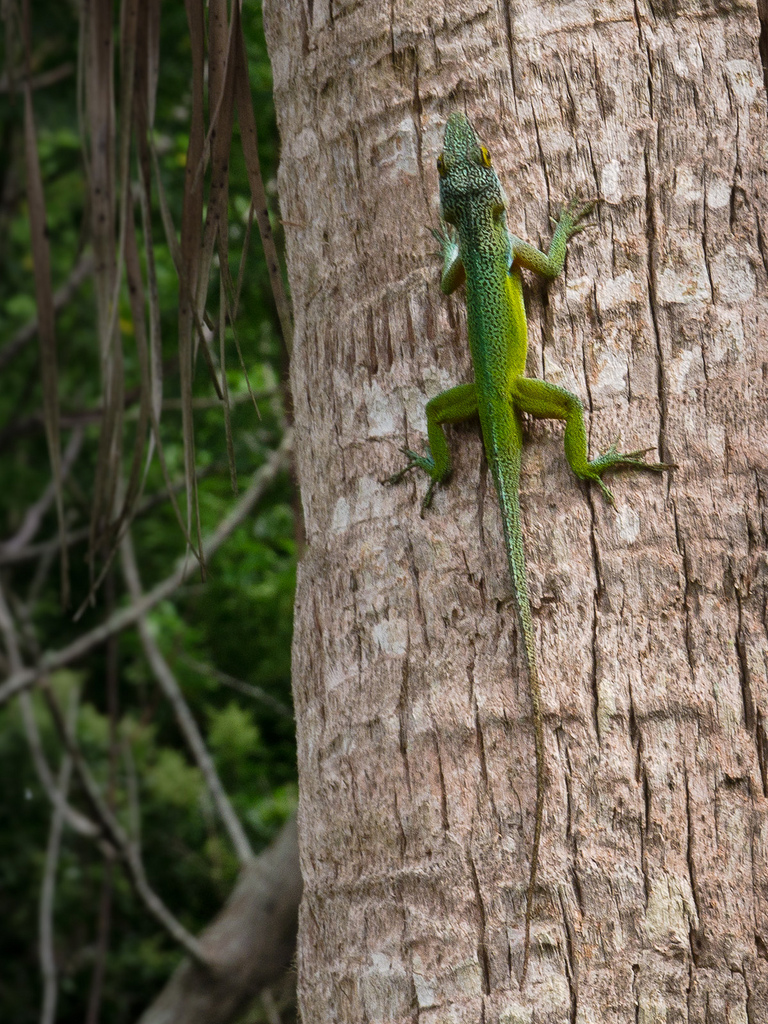
A.leachii on tree.
