= Little Scrub Island =

Island in Anguilla

- Location of Little Scrub Island within Anguilla

- Location within Anguilla Location within the Caribbean

Geography
- Location: Atlantic Ocean
- Coordinates: 18.2968°N 62.9554°W
- Archipelago: Antilles
- Area: 1.2 ha (3.0 acres)
- Highest elevation: 16 m (52 ft)

Administration
- United Kingdom
- British Overseas Territory: Anguilla

Additional information
- Time zone: AST (UTC−4)
- ISO code: AI

Little Scrub Island is an island in Anguilla, a British Overseas Territory in the Caribbean. The island is 1.3 km (0.81 mi) to the northeast of the main island of Anguilla, and 500 m (550 yd) west of Scrub Island. Despite its rocky, inhospitable environment, it is a nesting ground for various birds and home to an endemic species of lizard, the Little Scrub Island ground lizard (Pholidoscelis corax).

== Geography ==
Little Scrub Island is a rocky island surrounded by choppy waters that contribute to making the shoreline inhospitable. The island has no beaches nor bodies of freshwater. It covers an area of 1.2 hectares (3.0 acres) and rises to a maximum of elevation of 16 metres (52 ft) above sea level. It is located 500 m (550 yd) west of the bigger Scrub Island and 1.3 km (0.81 mi) northeast of the main island of Anguilla.

== Flora and fauna ==
The island was completely stripped of flora by Hurricane Luis in 1995 and Hurricane Lenny in 1999. Since then, the flora has recovered; morning glory (Ipomea violaceae) and prickly pear cactus (Opuntia dillenii) can be found in abundance on the island. These two plants are the main food source of Pholidoscelis corax, also known as the Little Scrub Island ground lizard, which is endemic to the island.

The island provides a nesting site for various birds, including the brown noddy, bridled tern, sooty tern, roseate tern, and the brown booby. Several dove (Zenaida aurita) nests were also identified during a 2010 survey, along with a single Sargasso shearwater nest. Brown pelicans also used the island at that time, but they were not observed to be nesting.
