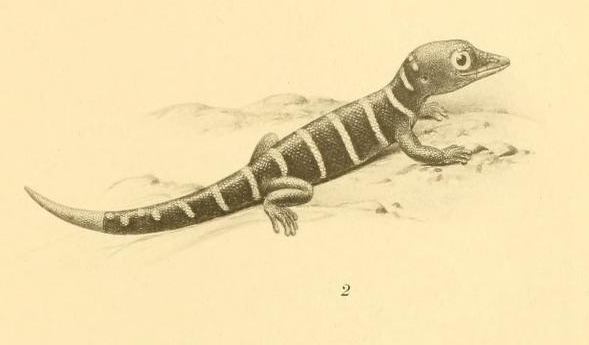
- 1921 illustration of specimen found on Antigua.

Conservation status
- Data Deficient (IUCN 3.1)

Scientific classification
- Domain: Eukaryota
- Kingdom: Animalia
- Phylum: Chordata
- Class: Reptilia
- Order: Squamata
- Infraorder: Gekkota
- Family: Sphaerodactylidae
- Genus: Sphaerodactylus
- Species: S. elegantulus

Binomial name
- Sphaerodactylus elegantulus Barbour, 1917

= Antigua least gecko =

Species of lizard

The Antigua least gecko (Sphaerodactylus elegantulus) is a gecko endemic to the island nation of Antigua and Barbuda in the Caribbean Lesser Antilles, where it is found on both main islands.
