= Redonda anole =

Conservation status
- Critically Endangered (IUCN 3.1)

Scientific classification
- Kingdom: Animalia
- Phylum: Chordata
- Class: Reptilia
- Order: Squamata
- Suborder: Iguania
- Family: Dactyloidae
- Genus: Anolis
- Species: A. nubilis

Binomial name
- Anolis nubilis Garman, 1887

Synonyms
- Anolis nubilus — Lazell, 1972

Species of lizard

The Redonda anole (Anolis nubilis) is a species of anole lizard that is endemic to the small, uninhabited island of Redonda, part of Antigua and Barbuda in the Caribbean Lesser Antilles.

== Description ==
It is various shades of gray all over, occasionally with a yellowish tint around its eye. Females have subtle striping on their back near their hindlimbs, and a stripe on each flank. As Redonda is almost entirely treeless, the Redonda anole spends most of its time on the ground and seeks shade under large rocks.

== Distribution and habitat ==
The anole is endemic to the small Caribbean island of Redonda, a dependency of Antigua and Barbuda. Although the island has an area of 54 hectares, the anole is restricted to an extremely small proportion of this due to the absence of suitable habitat, with its area of occupancy estimated at 0.4 km^{2}. The species is arboreal, as Redonda was historically dominated by tropical dry forest and scrub, and was usually found perched on shrubs or trees. The introduction of goats and their subsequent proliferation stripped the island of nearly all its natural vegetation, with trees restricted to portions of the island mostly inaccessible to goats and no shrubs seen at all in a 2012 survey. The anole showed some signs of having adapted to this change, foraging in lava rocks near the coast, but this led to a higher risk of predation by Redonda ameivas and (prior to 2017) rats. Before the removal of goats from Redonda, the anole was mostly seen on boulders or old buildings, and almost entirely avoided places without vegetation.

== Conservation ==
The Redonda anole is classified as being critically endangered by the IUCN Red List. It is one of six species of lizards endemic to the island, three of which are now extinct. All of these lizards were affected heavily by the historical presence of invasive mammals on the island, both due to direct predation by rats and due to habitat destruction caused by goats, which stripped the island of nearly all its native vegetation. Both invasive species were eliminated from the island in 2017 following efforts by the government of Antigua and Barbuda. Vegetation on the island has been rapidly recovering after the removal of goats, but the Redonda anole is now threatened by increasing populations of native predators and the increasing prevalence of hurricanes.

Surveys from the 1970s had contrasting descriptions of the prevalence of the anole, with the species being described as both "abundant" and "not abundant" by different sources. A 2012 survey found a population density of 771 anoles per hectare in areas with suitable habitat, while noting that the anole was almost entirely absent where there was no vegetation. The same survey estimated the total population of the lizard to number between 15,000 and 30,000 individuals, of which probably less than 10,000 were adults. Monitoring efforts post the 2017 removal of invasive mammals from Redonda have found a 300% increase in the population of the anole, but it is unclear if this trend will continue into the long-term.
