= Redonda ameiva =

Conservation status
- Critically Endangered (IUCN 3.1)

Scientific classification
- Kingdom: Animalia
- Phylum: Chordata
- Class: Reptilia
- Order: Squamata
- Family: Teiidae
- Genus: Pholidoscelis
- Species: P. atratus

Binomial name
- Pholidoscelis atratus (Garman, 1887)

Synonyms
- Ameiva atrata; Ameiva pluvianotata atrata

Species of lizard

The Redonda ameiva (Pholidoscelis atratus), also known as the Redonda ground dragon, is a species of lizard found only on Redonda. It is sometimes described as a subspecies of the Montserrat ameiva (Pholidoscelis pluvianotatus, previously called Ameiva pluvianotata).

== Morphology ==
In 2017, before the removal of goats and rats from Redonda, male ameivas measured 95 cm in snout–vent length on average and females measured 77 cm long on average. A year after the mammals' removal, both sexes had increased in size, with males measuring 111cm long on average and females measuring 94 cm long on average. Additionally, males developed larger, more robust heads and longer limbs, while females developed longer forelimbs.

== Distribution and habitat ==
The ameiva is endemic to the small Caribbean island of Redonda, a dependency of Antigua and Barbuda, where it is found from sea level to an elevation of around 400m. It inhabits primarily dry areas, such as beaches with boulders and Opuntia vegetation. It is thought to avoid places with scree due to a lack of food.

Redonda ameivas feed on seabird eggs, dead chicks, fish, invertebrates, and Opuntia fruit. They are also known to predate on the Redonda anole.

== Conservation ==
The Redonda ameiva is classified as being critically endangered by the IUCN Red List. It is one of six species of lizards endemic to the island, three of which are now extinct. Historically, the main threat to these species was the presence of invasive mammals on the island, both due to direct predation by rats and due to habitat destruction caused by goats, which stripped the island of nearly all its native vegetation. Rats also negatively affected Redonda's seabird colonies, reducing the amount of food available for the ameivas. Both invasive species were eliminated from the island in 2017 following efforts by the government of Antigua and Barbuda, following which the ameiva population has increased rapidly.

A 2012 survey of Redonda found a population density of 147 individuals per hectare in places with suitable habitat, a rather low density for Pholidoscelis ameivas, even considering the impact of invasive mammals on Redonda. This density was extrapolated to estimate a total population of 4,400 to 7,800 individuals, with the true population at that time likely tending towards the lower estimate. A 2017 survey conducted before the removal of invasive mammals found that the population density had decreased further to 112 individuals per hectare. Following the extirpation of rats and goats, the population has increased rapidly, tripling to 308 individuals per hectare by 2018 and growing threefold yet again to 935 individuals per hectare in 2019.
