= Redonda =

Uninhabited Caribbean island

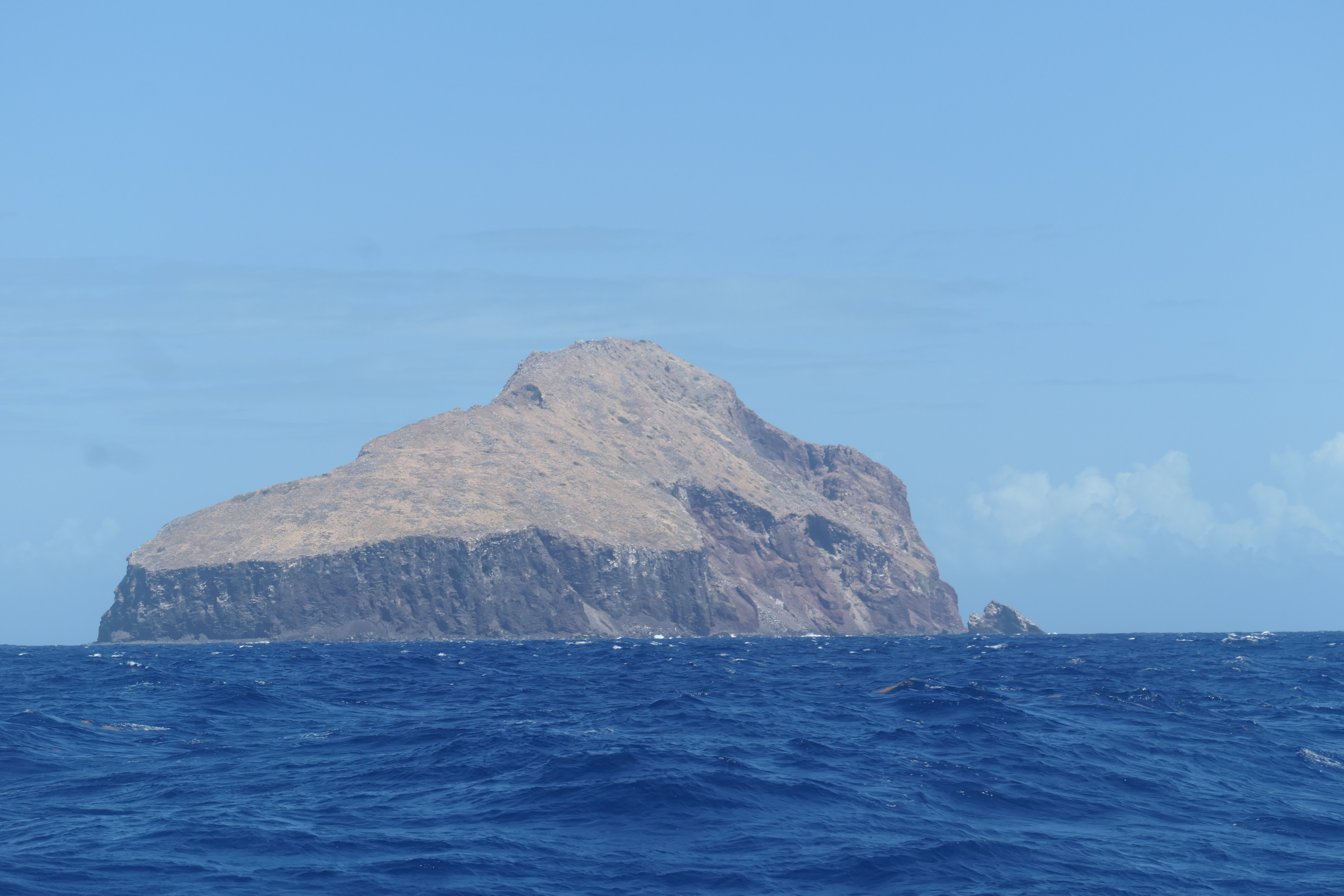
- The island of Redonda, viewed from the south in 2023

- Redonda highlighted in Antigua and Barbuda

- Location within Antigua and Barbuda Location within Lesser Antilles Location within the Caribbean

Geography
- Location: Caribbean Sea
- Coordinates: 16°56′18″N 62°20′42″W
- Archipelago: Leeward Islands, Lesser Antilles
- Area: 1.5 km^{2} (0.58 sq mi)
- Length: 1.36 km (0.845 mi)
- Width: 0.53 km (0.329 mi)
- Highest elevation: 296 m (971 ft)

Administration
- Antigua and Barbuda
- Parish: Saint John

Demographics
- Population: 0

Additional information
- Time zone: AST (UTC-4)

Redonda (Antiguan and Barbudan Creole: Radonda or Radawnda) is an uninhabited Caribbean island which is a dependency of Saint John, Antigua and Barbuda, in the Leeward Islands, West Indies. The island is about 1.6 kilometres (1 mi) long, 0.5 kilometres (0.3 mi) wide, and is 296 metres (971 ft) high at its highest point.

It lies between the islands of Nevis and Montserrat, 56.2 kilometres (34.9 mi) southwest of Antigua. Redonda is closer to Montserrat than to any other island; it is located 22.5 kilometres (14.0 mi) northwest of Montserrat and 32 kilometres (20 mi) southeast of Nevis.

Redonda is home to vast numbers of sea birds, and the island was an important source of guano before artificial fertilisers started to be mass-produced. Guano-mining operations started in the 1860s and ceased after the start of World War I. During the mining operations a few buildings and other installations were put in place on the island, and some physical remnants of that phase in its history are still visible.

The name "Redonda" means "round" in Spanish. In 1493, on his second voyage to the New World, Christopher Columbus saw the island and named it "Santa María la Redonda" (the name in the Spanish language means "Saint Mary the Round").

The island was annexed by the Antiguan Parish of Saint John on 26 March 1872.

== Description ==
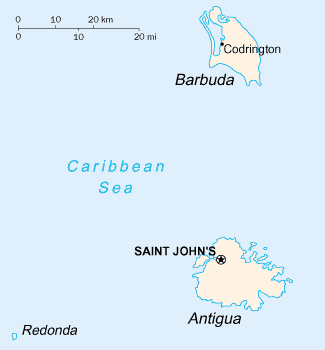
Antigua and Barbuda map with Redonda (lower left).

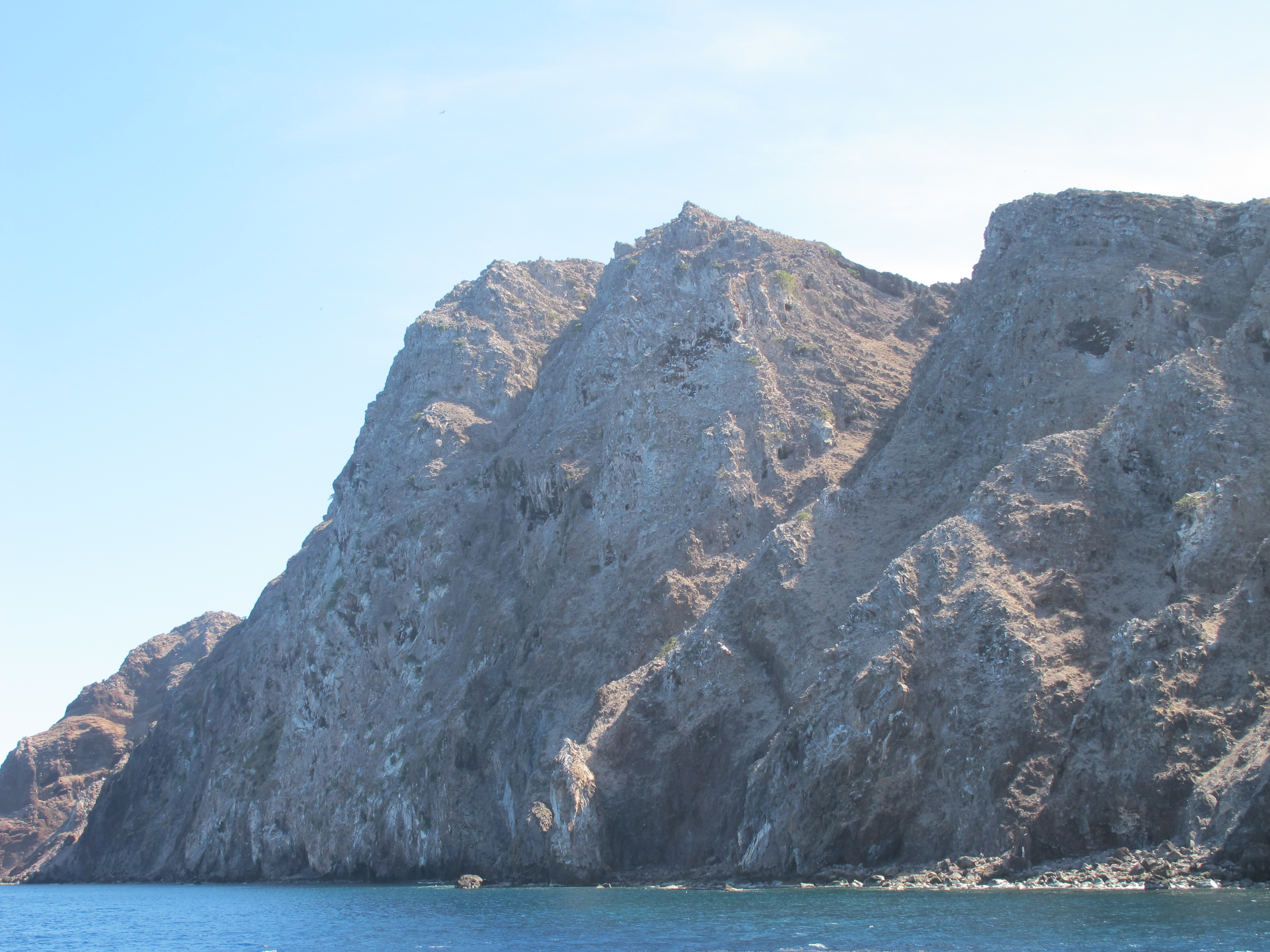
The west (leeward) coast of Redonda consists almost entirely of sheer cliffs many hundreds of feet high, 2011

At a distance, Redonda appears as if it were one very large rock. It is the remnant of an ancient extinct volcano. The land rises from sea level mostly as sheer cliffs, especially on the leeward (west) side. At the top of the island there is a relatively flat but tilted area of grassland which slopes to the east. There is no source of fresh water other than rain.

Judging by the name he gave the island, to Columbus the island appeared to be rounded, at least in profile. In reality the island is long and narrow, and reaches a height of almost 1,000 feet (300 m). The actual land area of the island is hard to estimate because of the extreme steepness of the slopes, but it is calculated to be somewhere between 1.6 square kilometres (400 acres) and 2.6 square kilometres (640 acres).

Redonda is uninhabited. The difficult topography, the lack of a safe place to land a boat, and the absence of any freshwater source other than rainfall makes the island inhospitable to humans.

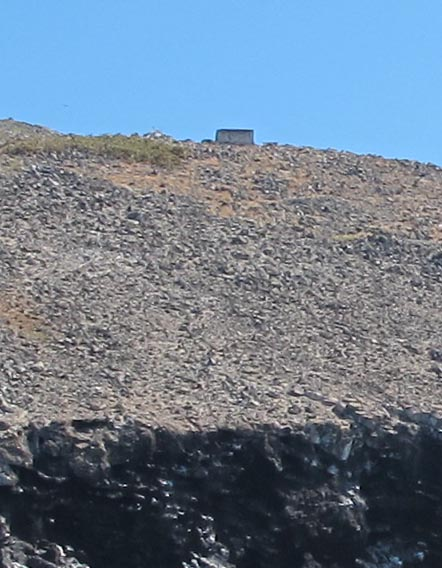
A small stone hut on the top of the island dates from the days when guano was mined there.

A herd of feral goats and thousands of rats were cleared from the island in 2017 as part of an island restoration programme.

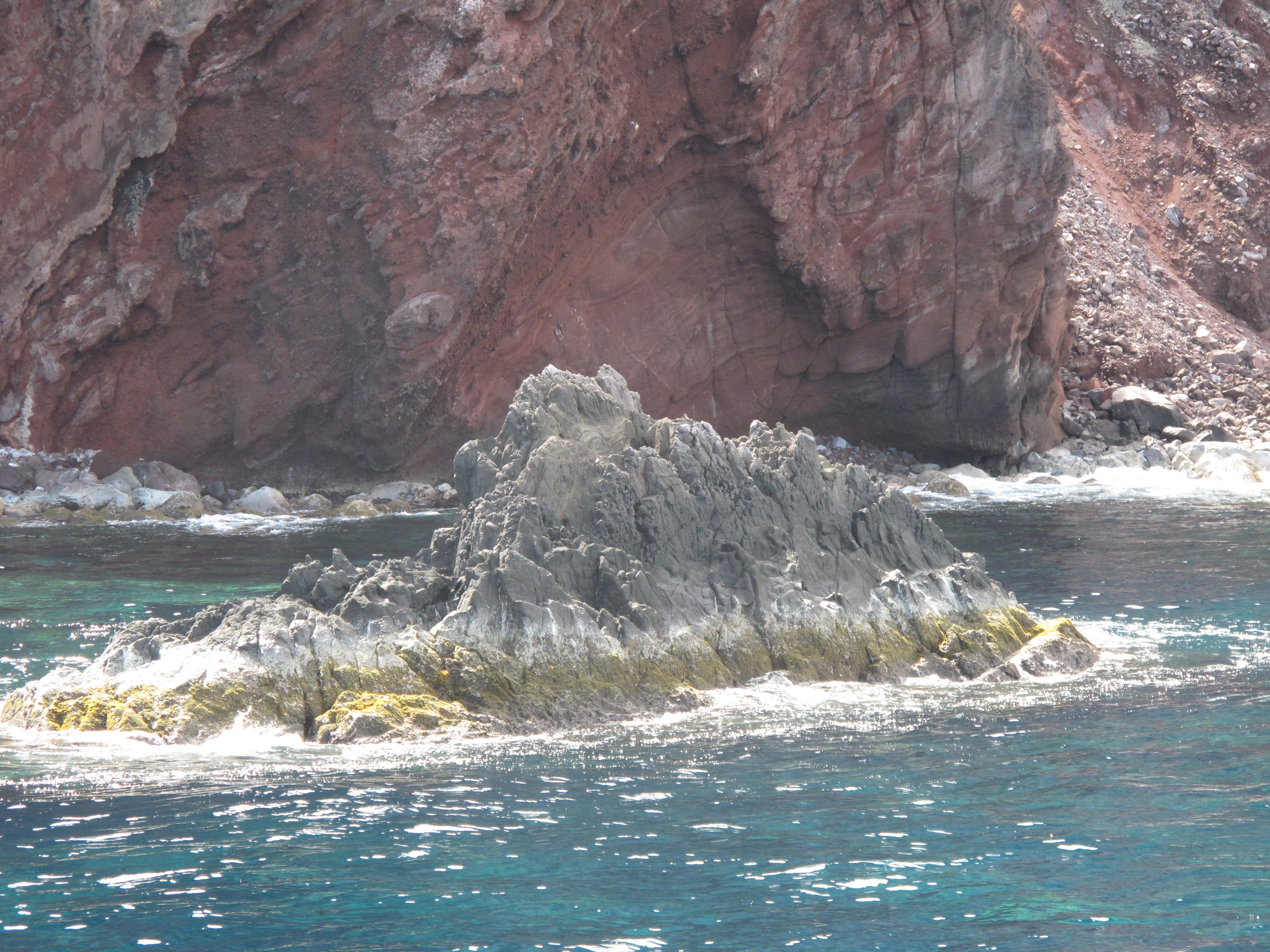
A detail of the west coast shows the reddish volcanic rock cliffs and a small rock islet with a visible intertidal algal zone, 2011

== History ==
In 1493, Christopher Columbus and his crew became the first known Europeans to see Redonda, on his second journey. He claimed it for the Crown of Castile, but did not land there. He named the island Santa María la Redonda, meaning Saint Mary the Round, reflecting the island's apparent profile when viewed from the side.

As the island is a rock of just over a square kilometre, it did not represent any interest for the powers involved in the colonisation of the Americas and, for centuries, it was a refuge for pirates.

In the 1860s, deposits of phosphate derived from seabird guano were discovered on Redonda, leading to commercial mining operations employing labourers from nearby Montserrat. The island was subsequently annexed to the British colony of Antigua (1869) in order to regulate extraction of these resources, and its incorporation was formalised by the Redonda Annexation Act of 1872.

During the decades after the 1860s, the rich guano deposits of Redonda were mined for fertiliser, with an annual yield of up to 7,000 tons. Only during this time was the island inhabited by workers; the population was 120 in 1901. After the guano mining, aluminium phosphate for gunpowder production was discovered and mined. A cableway was constructed to transport material down to the loading pier on the coast.

In 1914, during the First World War, the mining operations ceased, and most workers left the island. Maintenance workers remained on the island until 1929, when a hurricane destroyed almost all the remaining facilities. The island has remained uninhabited since then. Two stone huts still stand from the time when the island was occupied. Although the closest island to Redonda is Montserrat, and the second closest is Nevis, in 1967 Redonda became a dependency of the more distant Antigua, now part of Antigua and Barbuda.

Scientists from the Montserrat Volcano Observatory visit the island in a helicopter periodically; they are using Redonda as an observation point from which to take measurements of the Soufrière Hills, an active volcano on Montserrat.

== Ecology and conservation ==
The island is a breeding colony for multiple species of seabirds. It has been designated an Important Bird Area (IBA) by BirdLife International because it supports red-footed, brown and masked boobies, as well as magnificent frigatebirds.

Animals endemic to the island include the Redonda ground dragon, the Redonda anole and an unnamed species of dwarf gecko.

The island's local ecology was severely affected by invasive species, particularly introduced goats and rats, for almost a century. Island restoration efforts were initiated in 2016, beginning with removing the island's 60 goats and roughly 6,000 rats. The Redonda Restoration Programme involves the Environmental Awareness Group, Wildlife Management International and Fauna and Flora International. Several years after the goats were removed, some local plant life began to recover.

In September 2023, the Redonda Ecosystem Reserve was established, covering nearly 30,000 hectares (74,000 acres) of land and sea, making it the largest marine protected area in the region.

== Micronation ==
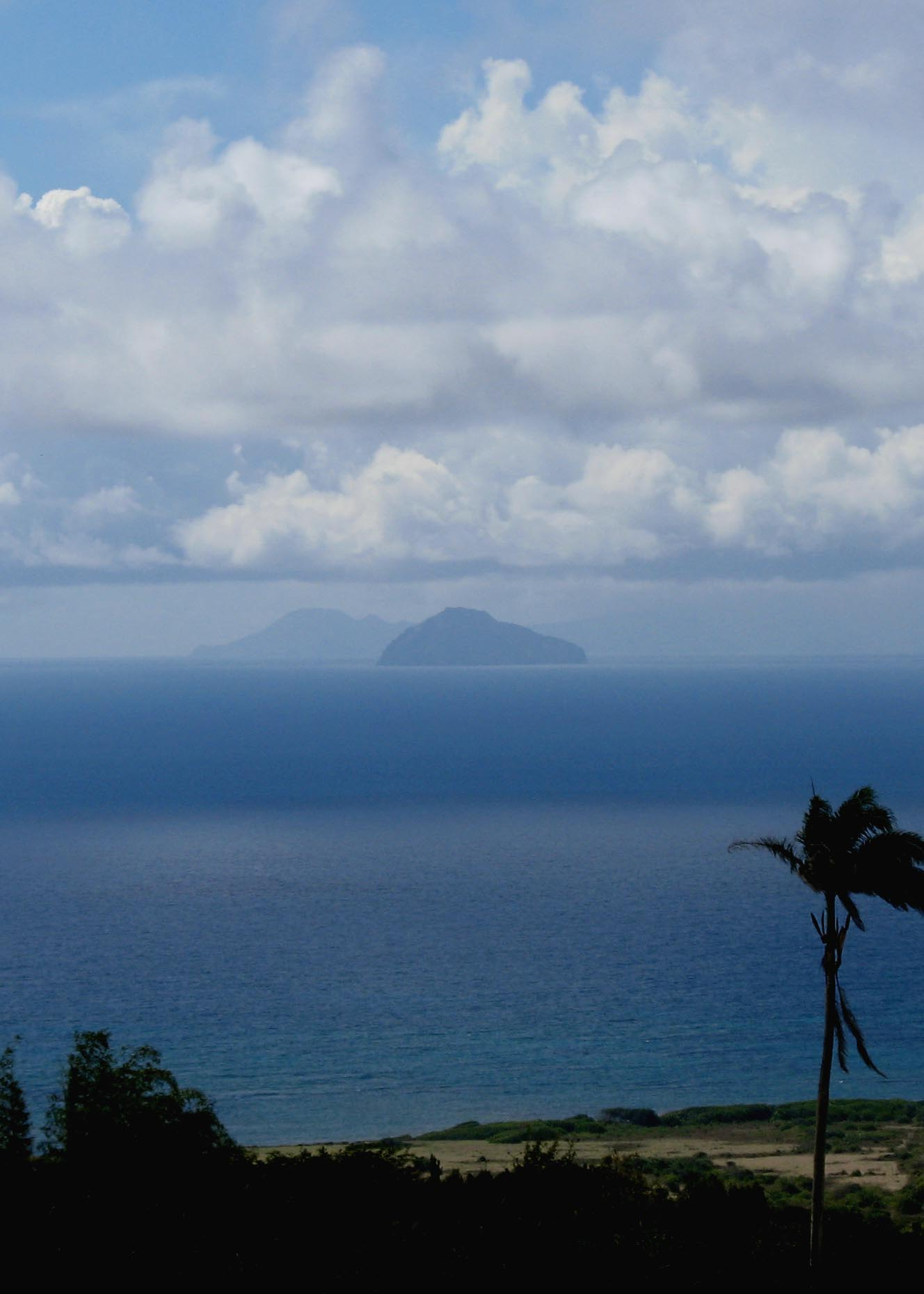
The island of Redonda, seen from Nevis, with Montserrat in the distance, 2006

Redonda is the setting for the myth of the "Kingdom of Redonda". M. P. Shiel, an author of fantasy novels, claimed that in the year of his birth, 1865, his father Matthew Dowdy Shiell, from Montserrat, decided to celebrate his first male child by arranging for the boy to be crowned King of Redonda at the age of 15, in a ceremony purportedly carried out on the small island by a bishop.

Shiel first expressed the idea of the "Kingdom of Redonda" in a promotional leaflet for his books. Since then, the title has been "passed down", and continues to the present day. For a period of time the "Royal" lineage of Redonda had a more or less solely literary theme, with the title being given to John Gawsworth who was responsible for popularising the title. Gawsworth is reported to have sold the title several times before Gawsworth's literary agent Jon Wynne-Tyson (King Juan II) claimed it had been passed to him shortly before Gawsworth died. Wynne-Tyson's successor, the Spanish novelist Javier Marías (King Xavier), and his rival contenders for the Redondan title, such as William L. Gates and Bob Williamson, were featured in a BBC Radio 4 documentary, Redonda: The Island with Too Many Kings, which was broadcast in May 2007. Queen Maggie, Shiel's granddaughter, and heir, Margaret Parry, declined to participate.

== See also ==
- Rodondo Island, in Bass Strait between Australia and Tasmania, which was named for its resemblance to Redonda
