= List of amphibians and reptiles of Dominica =

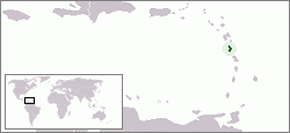
Location of Dominica in the Caribbean

This is a list of amphibians and reptiles found on Dominica, a Caribbean island-nation in the Lesser Antilles. Dominica is one of the few islands in that chain that has retained its original amphibian and reptile fauna over the last 200 years, and reptiles in particular form a significant part of its fauna.

== Amphibians ==
There are four species of amphibians on Dominica, all from the frog family Leptodactylidae. Three are native, and one, Eleutherodactylus amplinympha, is endemic to Dominica.

=== Frogs (Anura) ===
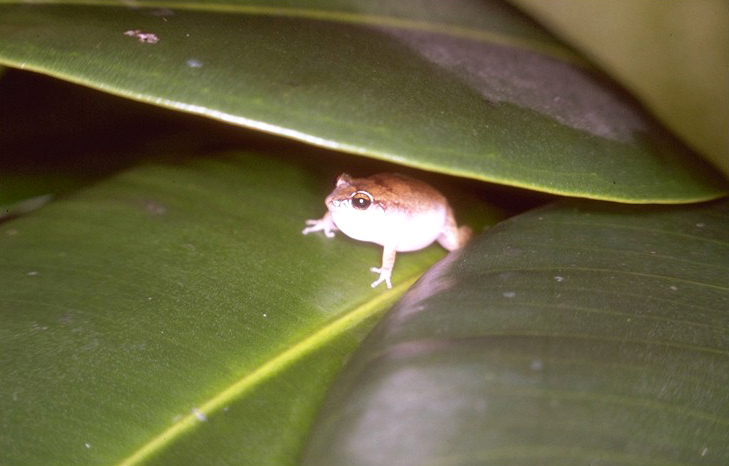
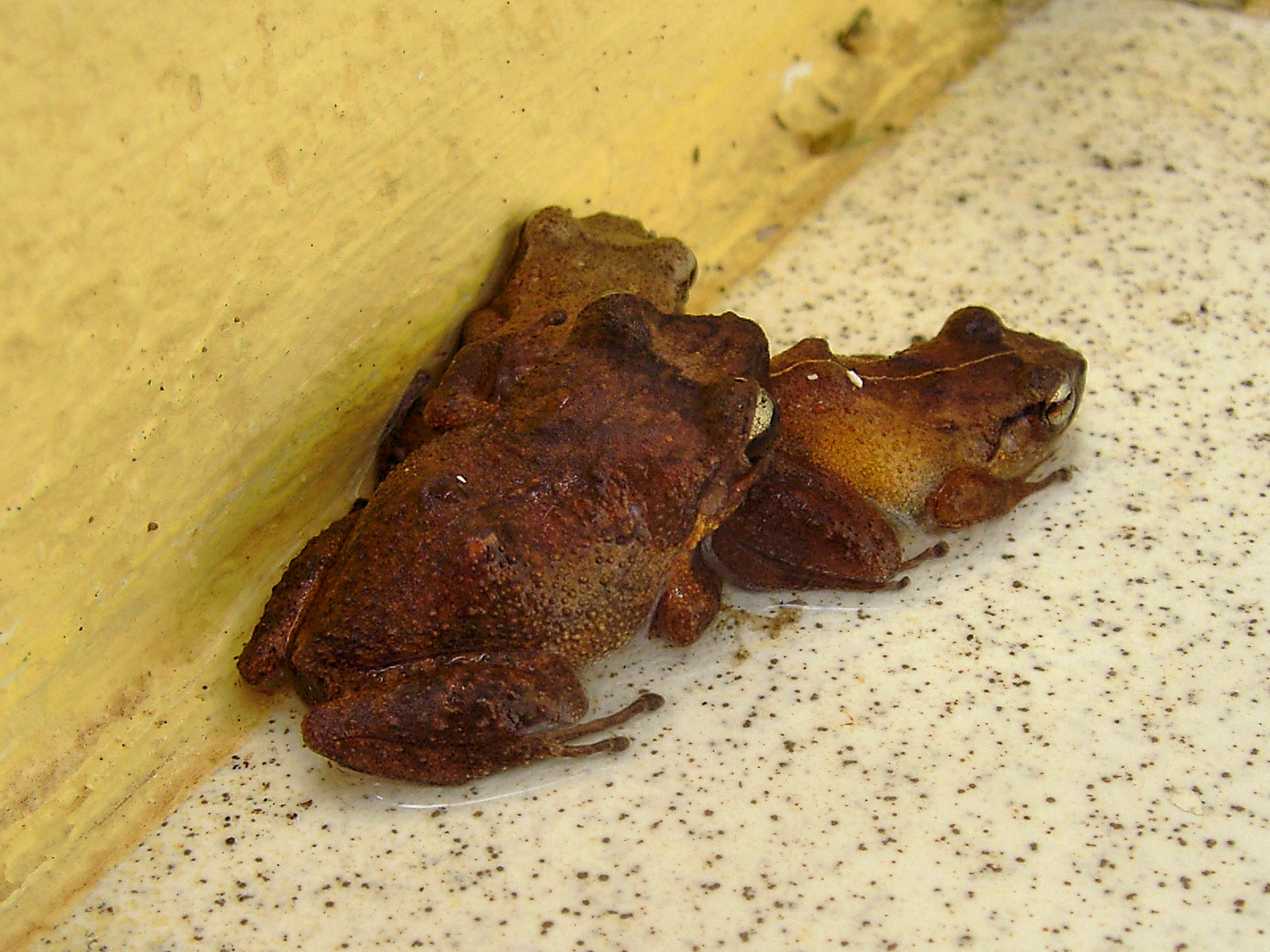
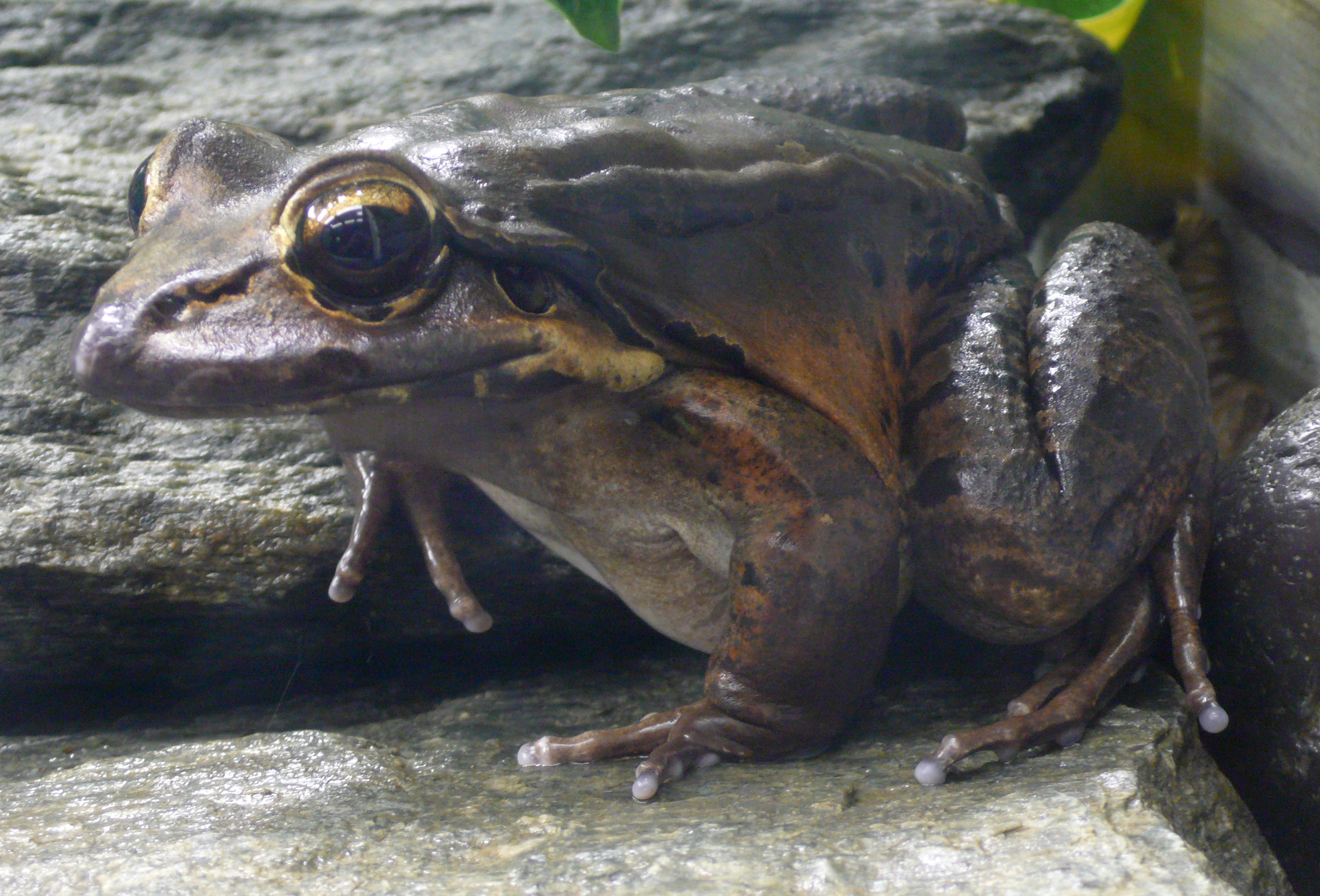
Tropical frogs (Leptodactylidae)
Species	Common name(s)	Notes	Image
Eleutherodactylus amplinympha	Gounouj	Endangered. Endemic. First described in 1994. Most abundant in transition zone between montane rainforest and elfin woodland, but range also extends over broader range of altitudes, coexisting with E. martinicensis.
Eleutherodactylus johnstonei	Lesser Antillean whistling frog, coqui antillano, Johnstone's whistling frog	Least concern. Recently introduced. Widespread throughout the Lesser Antilles.
Eleutherodactylus martinicensis	Tink frog, Martinique robber frog	Near threatened. Regional endemic. Abundant in rain forest; uncommon in dry coastal forest. Local populations are being displaced by E. johnstonei along part of the west (Caribbean) coast.
Leptodactylus fallax	Giant ditch frog, mountain chicken	Critically endangered. Regional endemic. Natural range on the western (Caribbean) side of Dominica from sea level to 400 m elevation. Populations are infected with chytridiomycosis and are in severe decline. Widely eaten in Dominica as a novelty food prior to its legal protection in 2002.

== Reptiles ==
Two of the four extant orders of reptile are represented on Dominica: Squamata and Testudines. Including marine turtles and introduced species, there are a total of 19 confirmed species of reptiles.

Endemic reptile species include the Dominican anole (Anolis oculatus), the Dominican ground lizard (Ameiva fuscata) and the Dominica skink (Mabuya dominicana). The Dominican blind snake (Typhlops dominicanus or T. d. dominicanus) and the Dominican clouded boa (Boa constrictor nebulosis) may also be designated as endemic, though their status as distinct subspecies is unresolved.

=== Turtles (Testudines) ===
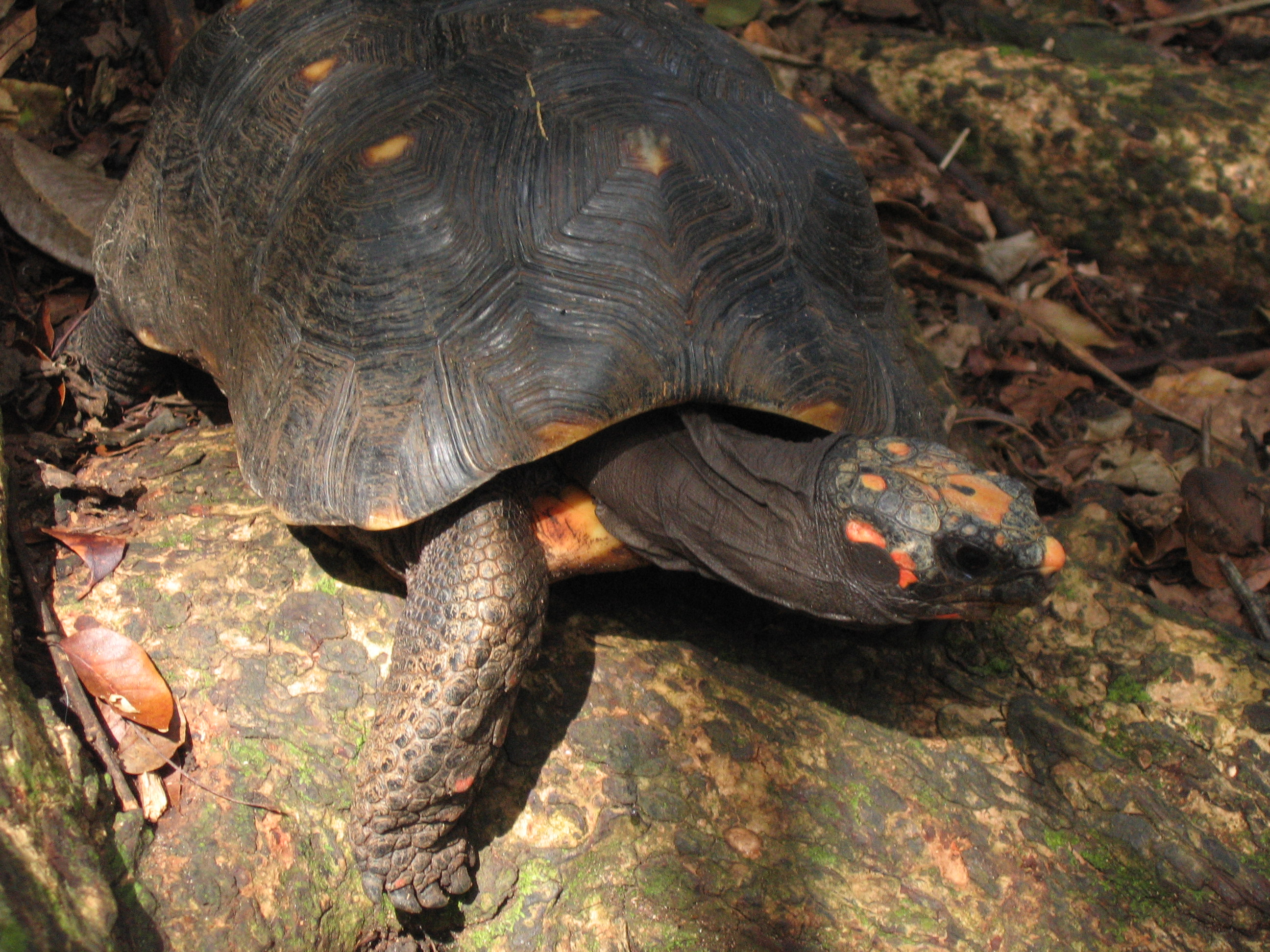
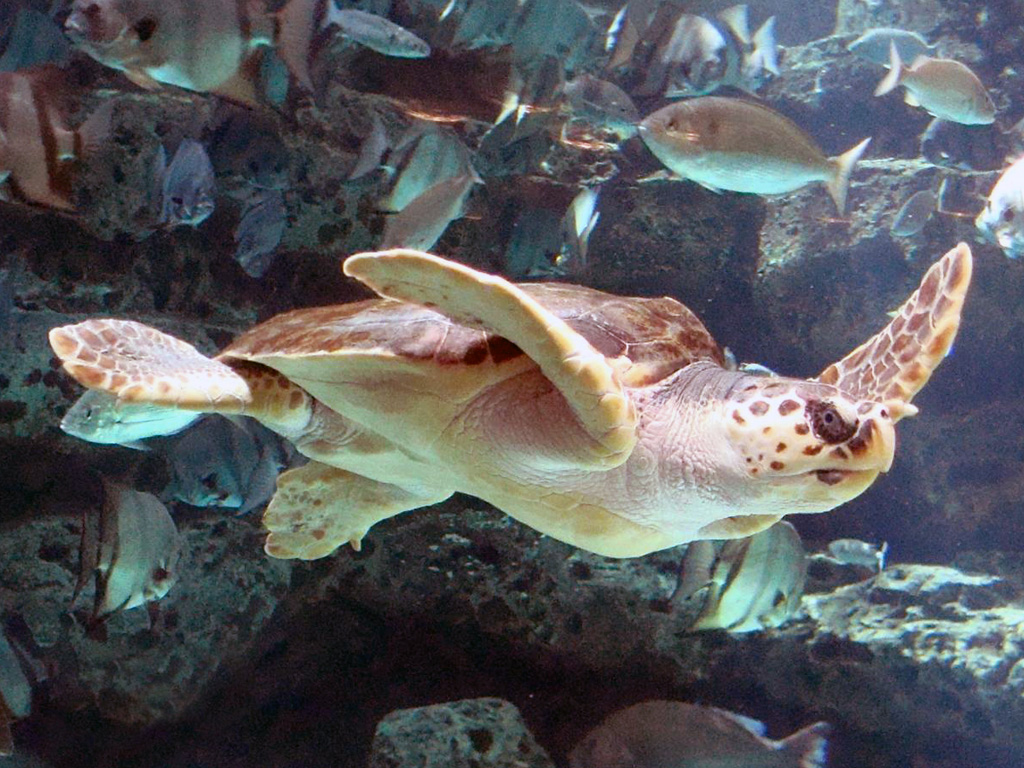
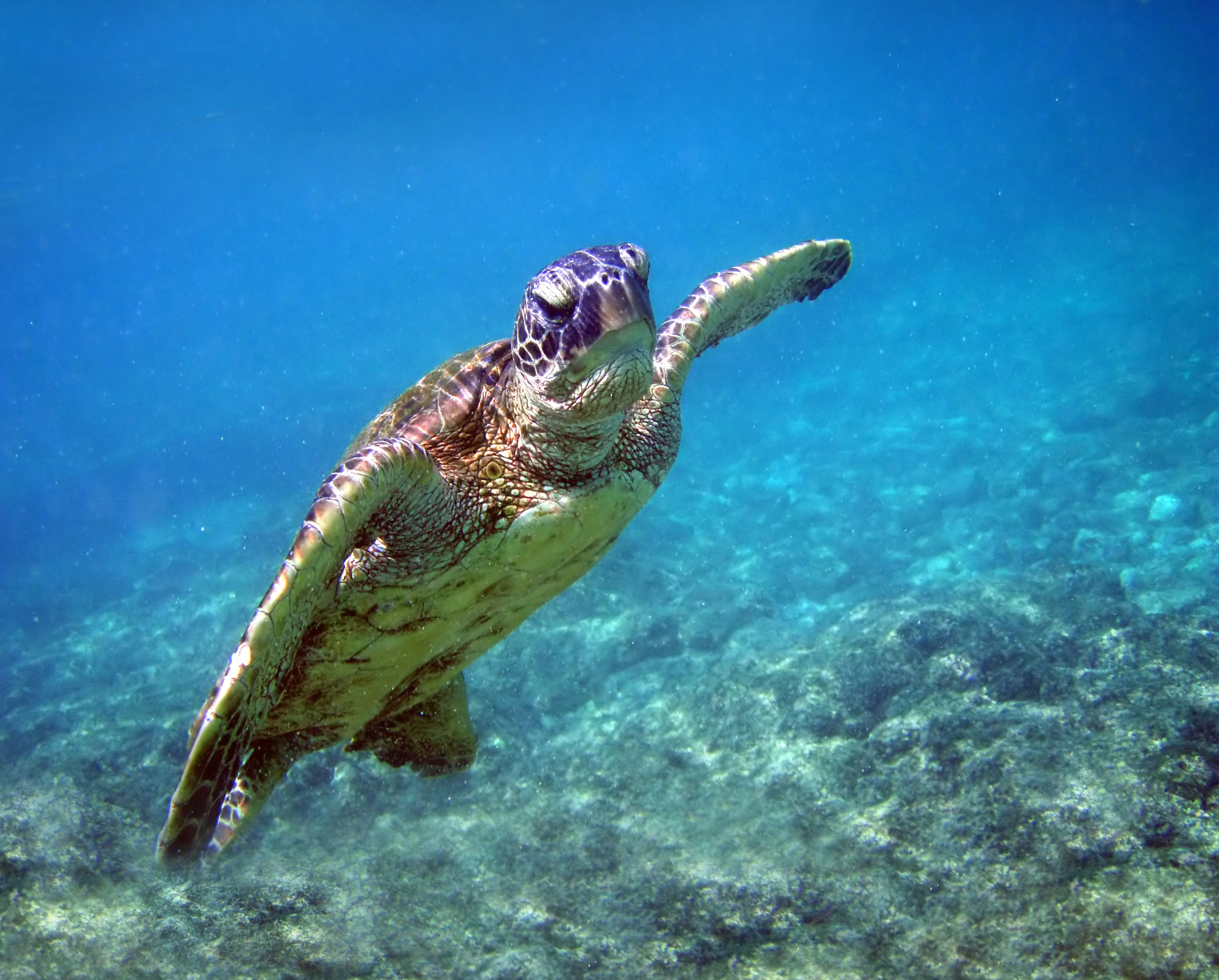
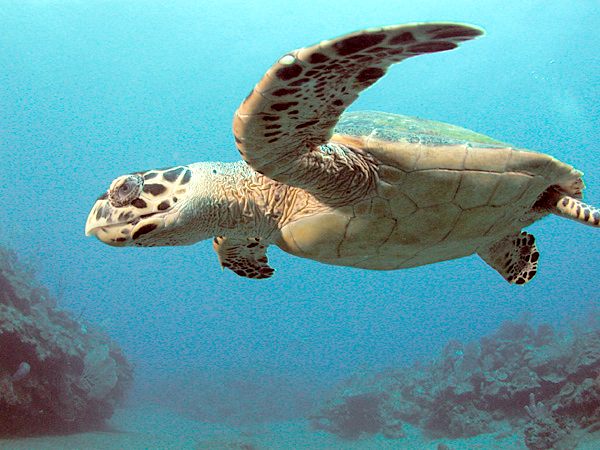
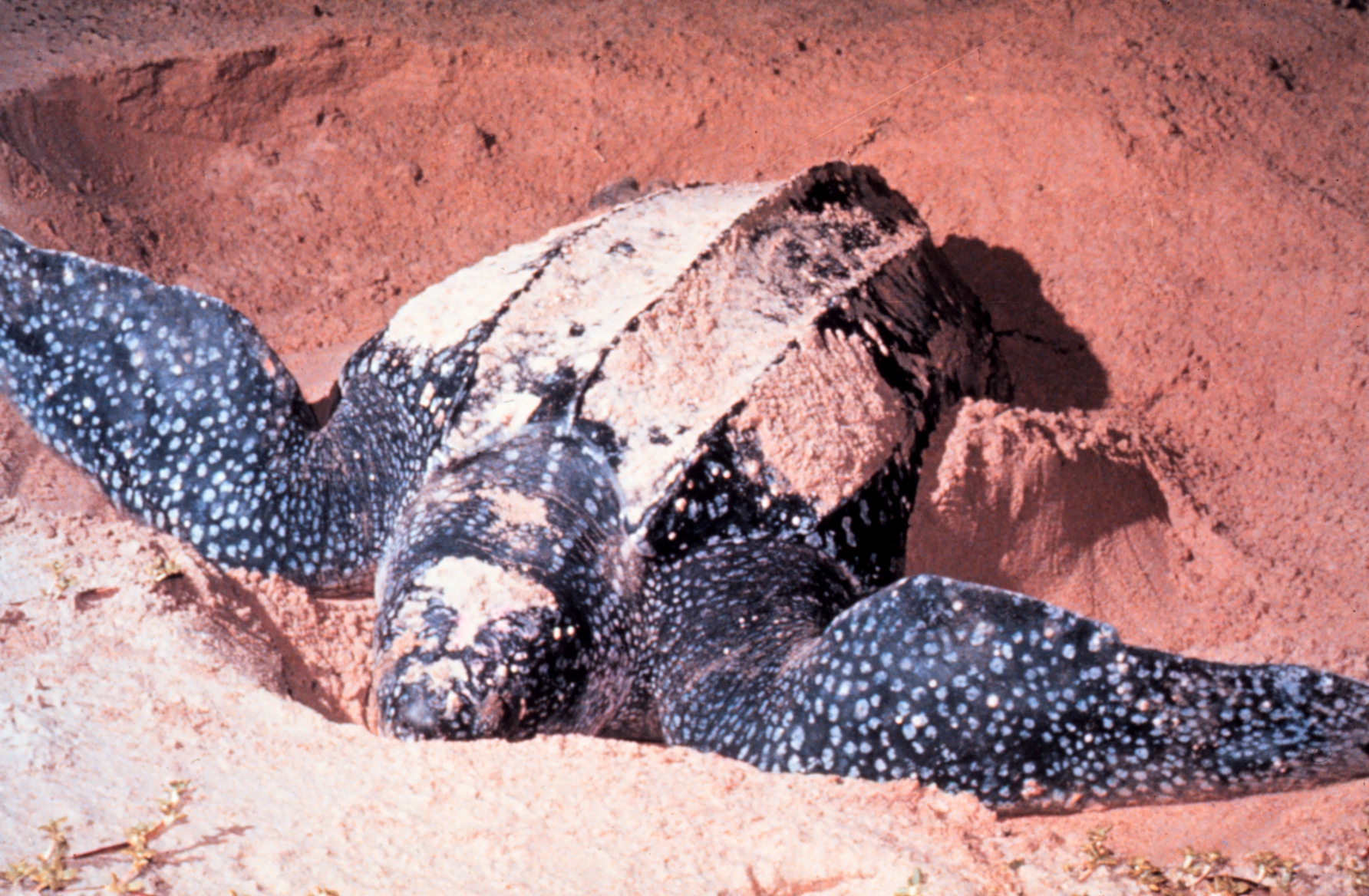
Tortoises (Testudinidae)
Species	Common name(s)	Notes	Image
Geochelone carbonaria	Red-footed tortoise	Likely recent introduction, though possibly as long ago as Amerindian settlement of Dominica. Rarely seen in the wild.
Scaly sea turtles (Cheloniidae)
Species	Common name(s)	Notes	Image
Caretta caretta	Loggerhead turtle, channel turtle (local name)	Endangered. Rare in Dominican waters; mainly recorded around Soufriere Bay and from Martinique and Guadeloupe Channels. Not recorded nesting on Dominica.
Chelonia mydas	Green turtle	Endangered. Regularly seen in coastal waters; nests on both coasts (though mainly on northern beaches), primarily from June to October.
Eretmochelys imbricata	Hawksbill turtle	Critically endangered. Regularly seen in coastal waters; nests on both coasts (though mainly on northern beaches), primarily from May to October.
Leathery sea turtles (Dermochelyidae)
Species	Common name(s)	Notes	Image
Dermochelys coriacea	Leatherback turtle	Critically endangered. Fairly rare, mainly recorded from Martinique and Guadeloupe Channels. Nesting recorded from April to June, primarily on south and east (Atlantic) coast beaches.

=== Lizards and snakes (Squamata) ===
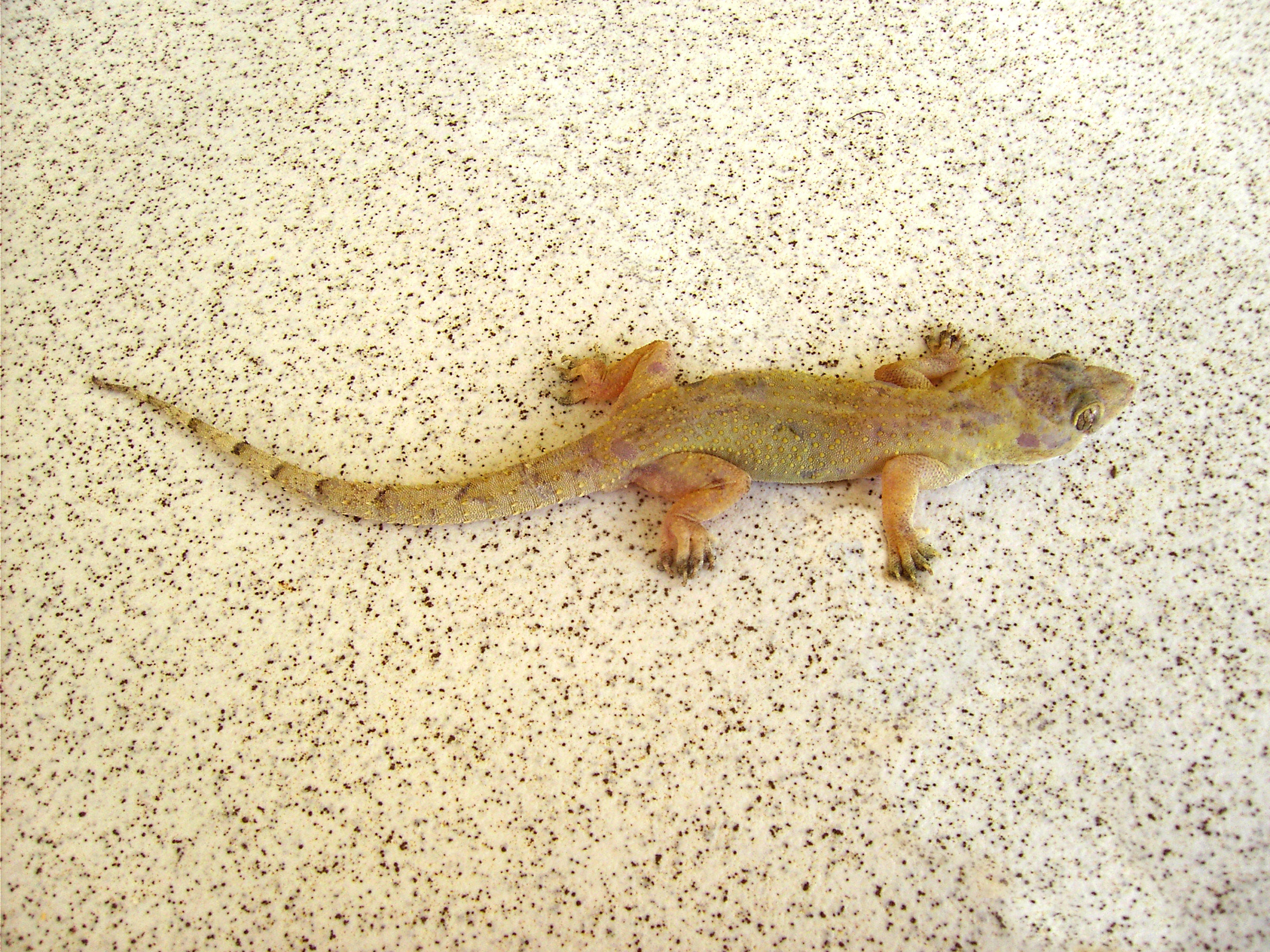
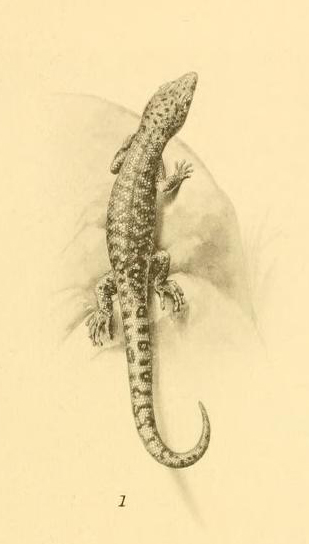
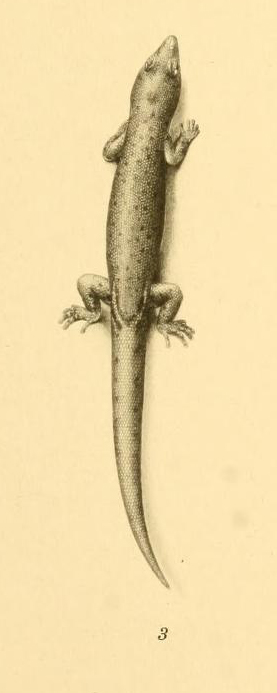
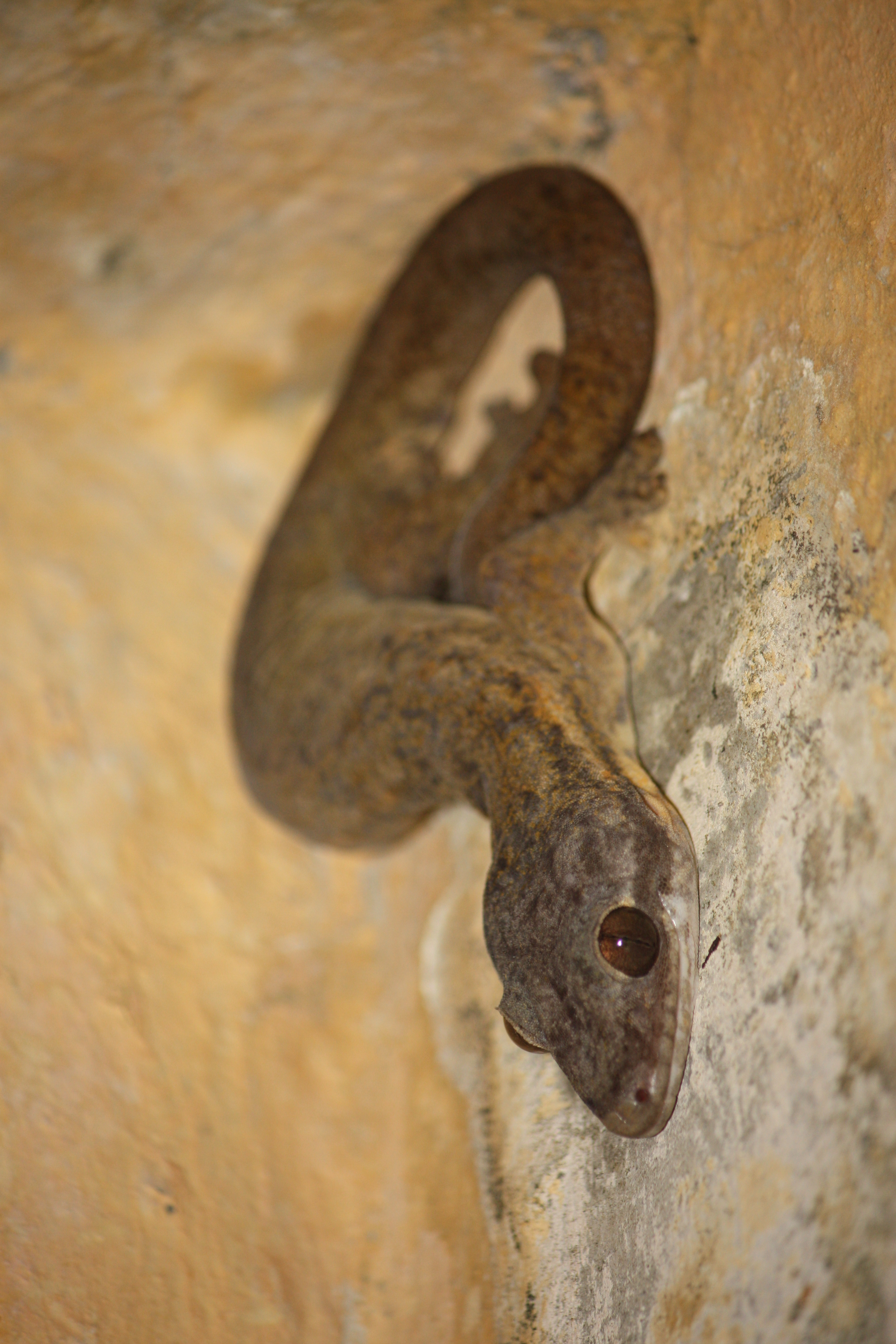
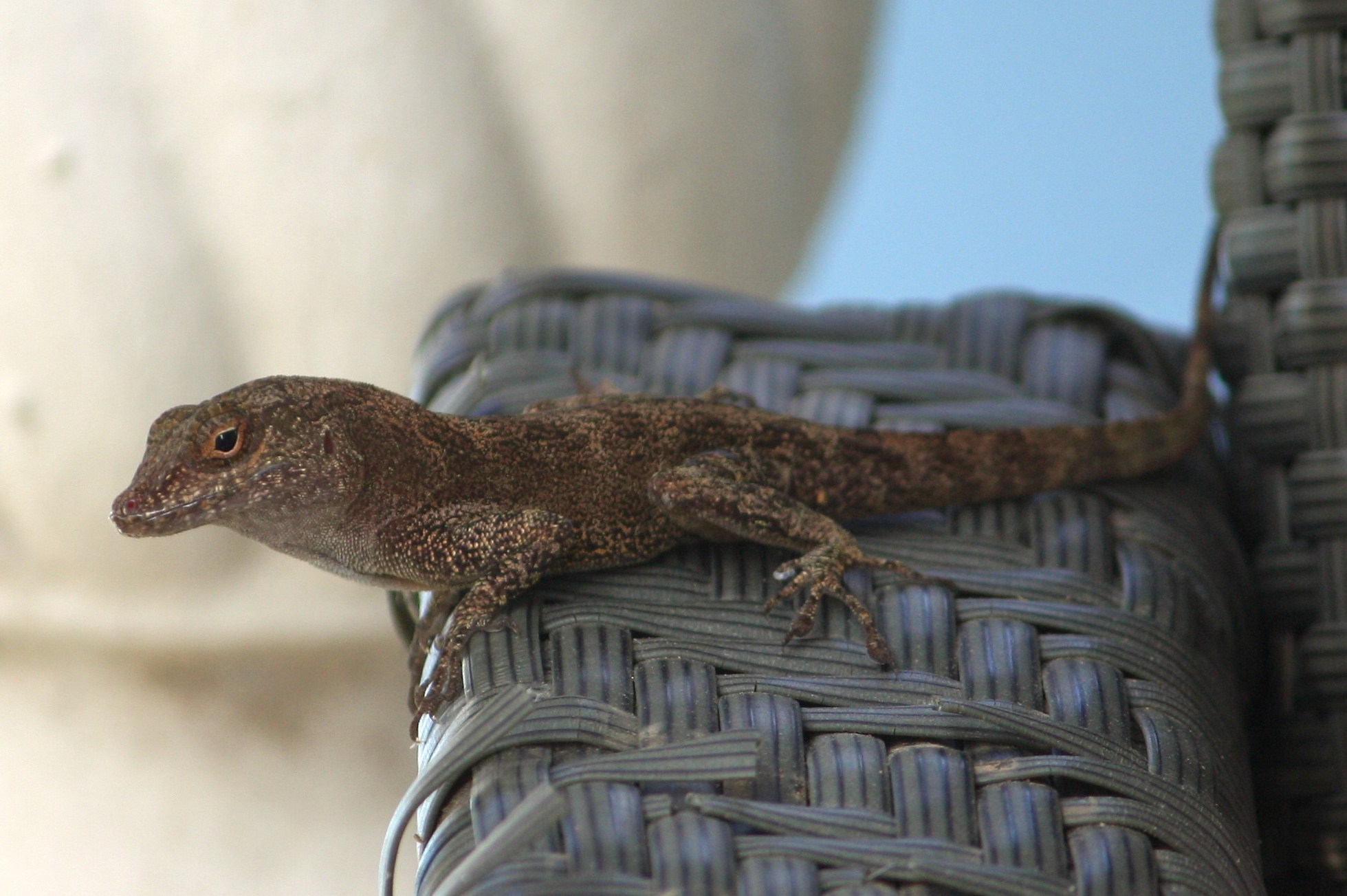
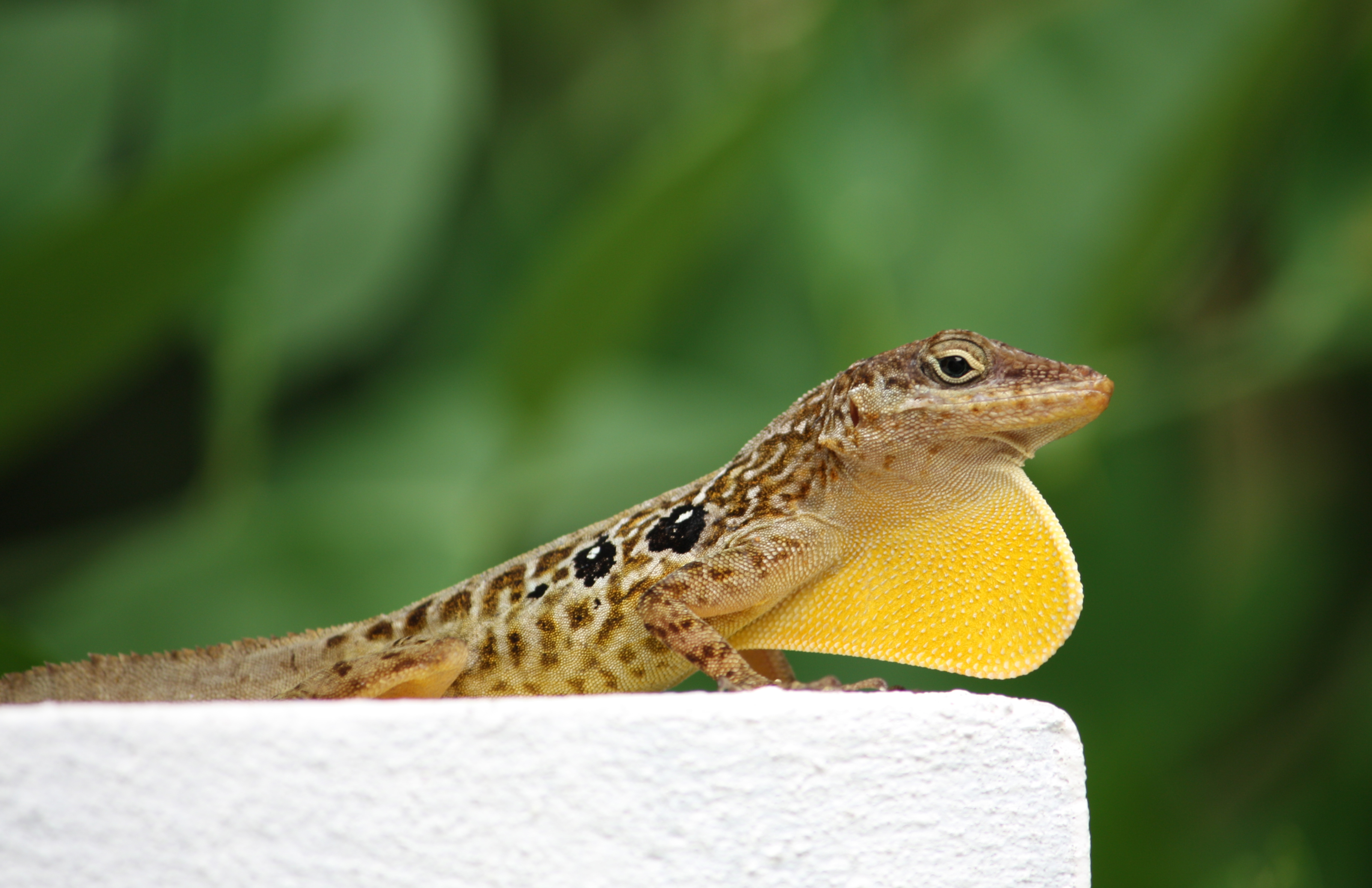
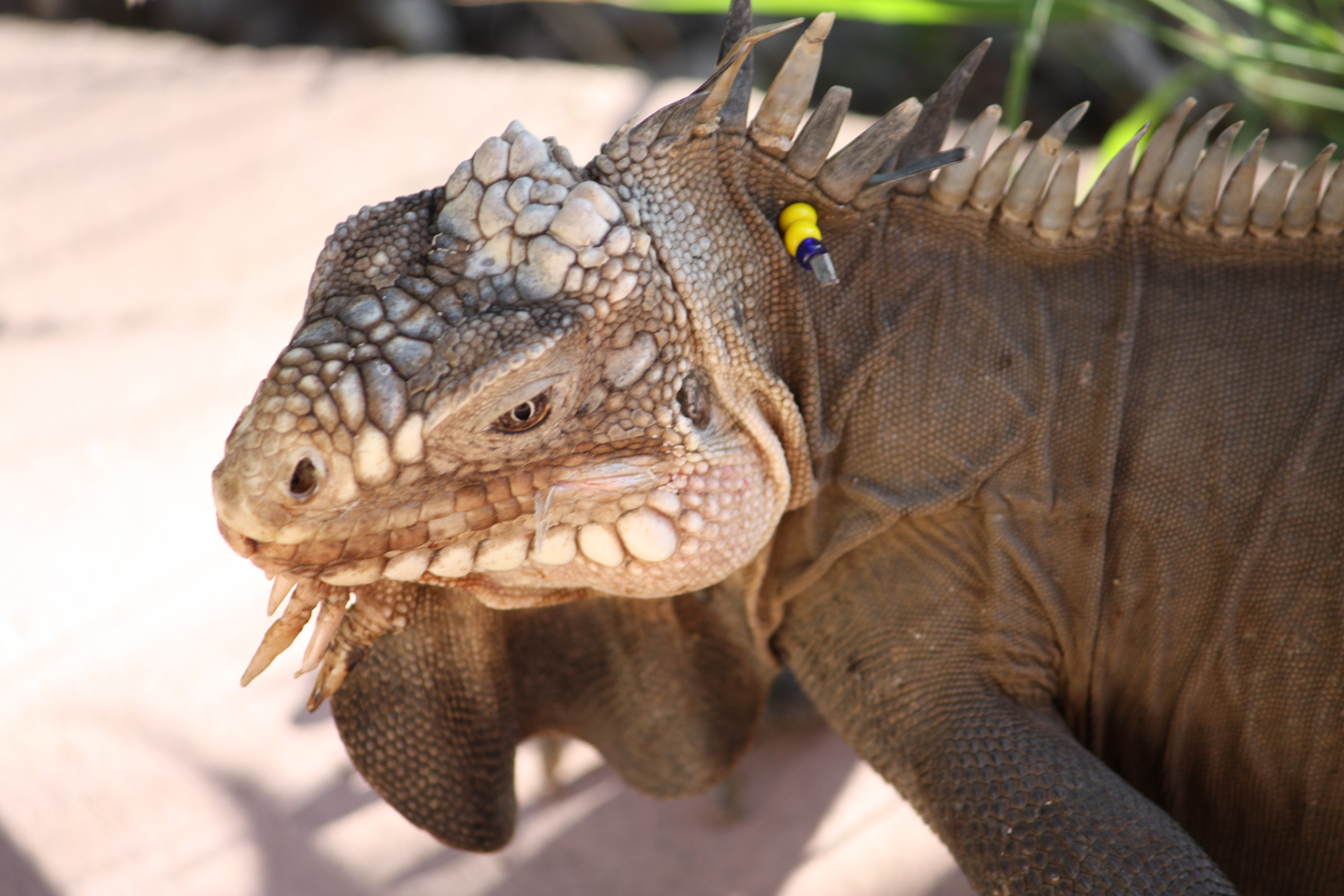
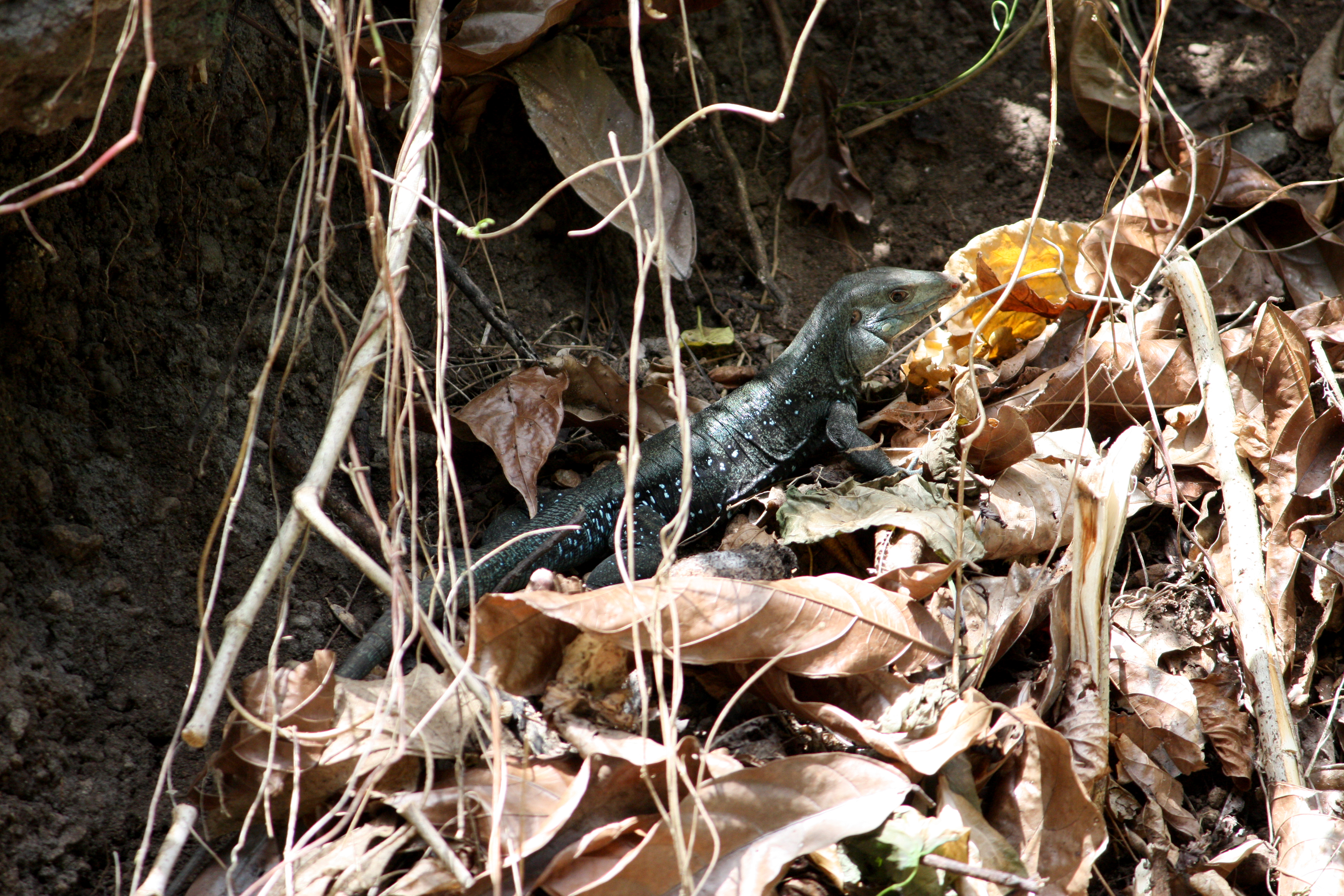
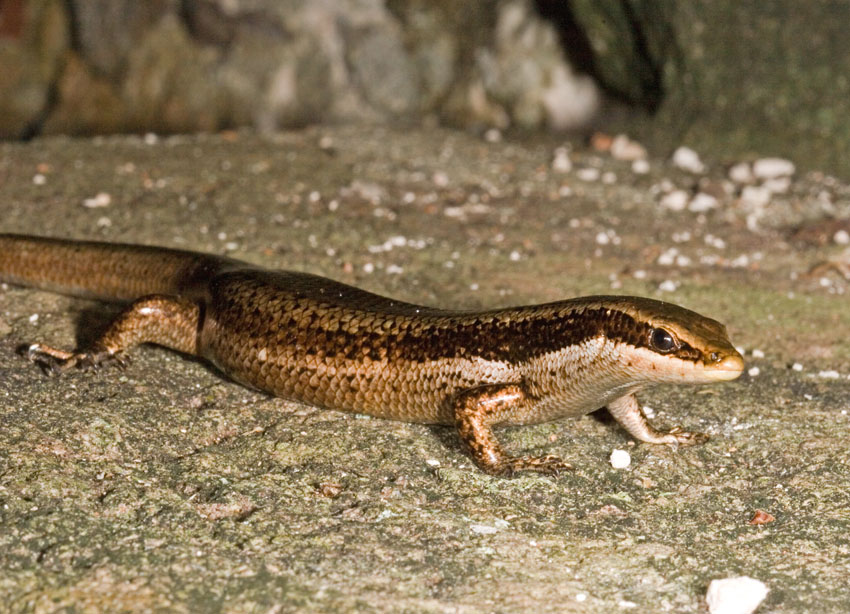
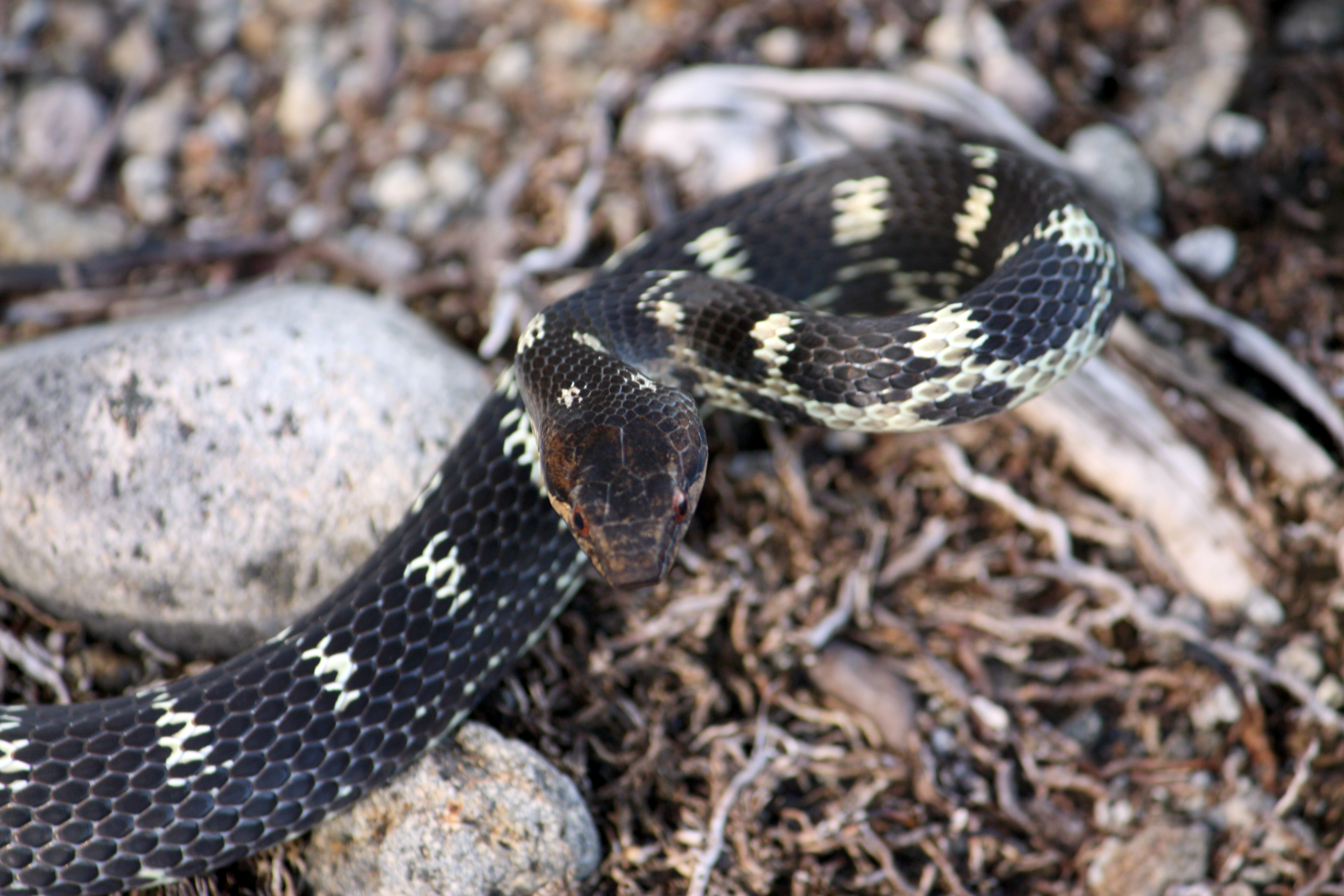
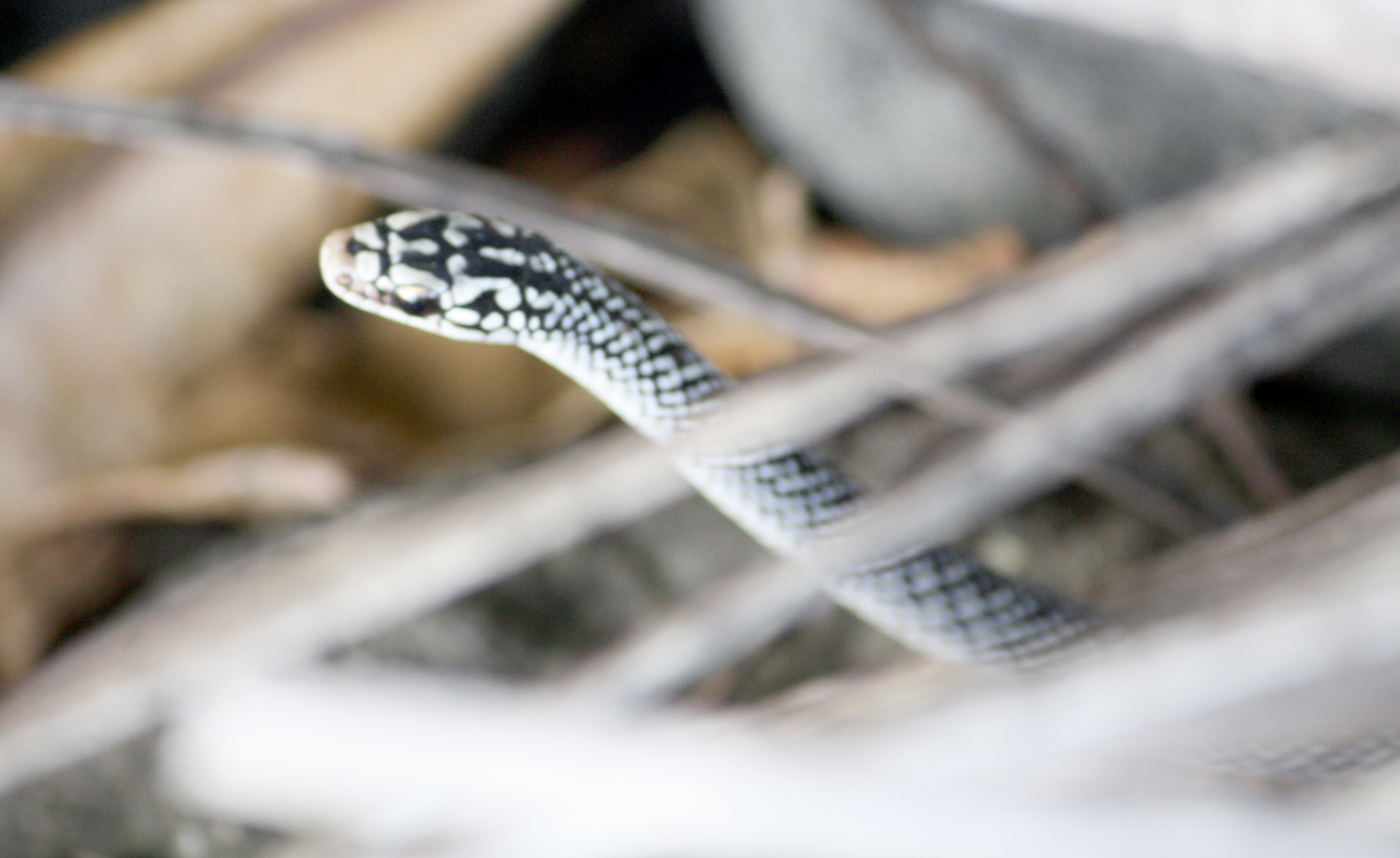
Geckos (Gekkonidae)
Species	Common name(s)	Notes	Image
Hemidactylus mabouia	House gecko	Introduced. Widespread, usually around human populations.
Sphaerodactylus fantasticus	Fantastic least gecko	Found at scattered locations along west (Caribbean) coast. Regional endemic; Dominica population has been described as subspecies S. f. fuga.
Sphaerodactylus vincenti	Vincent's least gecko	Confined to wet high elevations. Endemic to the Windward islands.
Thecadactylus rapicauda	Tree gecko, turnip-tailed gecko	Widespread
Iguanas and Anolids (Iguanidae)
Species	Common name(s)	Notes	Image
Anolis cristatellus	Puerto Rican crested anole	Recent introduction (between 1997 and 2002); range limited to southwest (Caribbean) coast around capital of Roseau.
Anolis oculatus	Dominican anole, eyed anole, tree lizard	Endemic. Four subspecies described (A. o. oculatus, A. o. cabritensis, A. o. montanus, A. o. winstoni) now recognized as ecotypes. Widespread and abundant in all areas below 900 m elevation. South Caribbean ecotype is being displaced by competition from invasive A. cristatellus.
Iguana delicatissima	Lesser Antillean iguana, West Indian iguana	Vulnerable. Regional endemic. Common on Dominica in certain areas on both east (Atlantic) and west (Caribbean) coasts; occasionally seen in rain forest.
Whiptails (Teiidae)
Species	Common name(s)	Notes	Image
Pholidoscelis fuscatus	Dominican ground lizard, Dominican ameiva	Endemic. Found in dry coastal woodland and associated cultivated areas below 300 m elevation.
Microteiids (Gymnophthalmidae)
Species	Common name(s)	Notes	Image
Gymnophthalmus underwoodi	Underwood's spectacled tegu	Very similar to G. pleii known to be extant on Dominica; variability of scale counts of collected specimens suggest G. underwoodi (or other Gymnophthalmus species) is also present. Presence confirmed 2008 by Turk, Wyszynski, Powell, and Henderson at Batali Beach
Gymnophthalmus pleii	Martinique spectacled tegu	Officially recorded only at Cabrits National Park and Dominica Botanical Gardens in Roseau, but likely more widespread, and probably with other Gymnophthalmus species present.
Skinks (Scincidae)
Species	Common name(s)	Notes	Image
Mabuya dominicana	Dominica skink	Island endemic. Widespread in coastal regions and in cultivated areas at higher elevations.
Worm snakes (Typhlopidae)
Species	Common name(s)	Notes	Image
Typhlops dominicanus	Dominican blind snake, worm snake	Local population either described as endemic species, or endemic subspecies T. d. dominicana, with sister subspecies present on Guadeloupe.
Boas (Boidae)
Species	Common name(s)	Notes	Image
Boa constrictor	Boa constrictor; Dominican clouded boa	Local population sometimes described as endemic subspecies B. c. nebulosa. Widely distributed in Dominica, though vulnerable to persecution, road accidents, and hunting for snake oil derived from its fat.
Colubrids (Colubridae)
Species	Common name(s)	Notes	Image
Alsophis antillensis	Antilles racer, island racer, leeward racer, Dominican racer	Regional endemic. Local population described as endemic subspecies A. a. sibonius or as separate species, A. sibonius. Present everywhere except highest elevations; most abundant in dry woodland on west (Caribbean) coast.
Liophis juliae	Julia's ground snake, grove snake	Present everywhere except highest elevations. Local population described as endemic subspecies L. j. juliae, with two sister subspecies present on islands of Guadeloupe.

== Unconfirmed or disputed reptile species ==
Species	Common name(s)	Notes	Image
Clelia errabunda	Underwood's Mussurana	A species from Saint Lucia originally recorded on Dominica (as C. clelia) due to a cataloguing error. Reported sightings are most likely melanistic forms of boa.
Sphaerodactylus microlepis	Little-scaled least gecko	Main range is on St. Lucia; only record for presence on Dominica consists of a single specimen with no precise locality.
