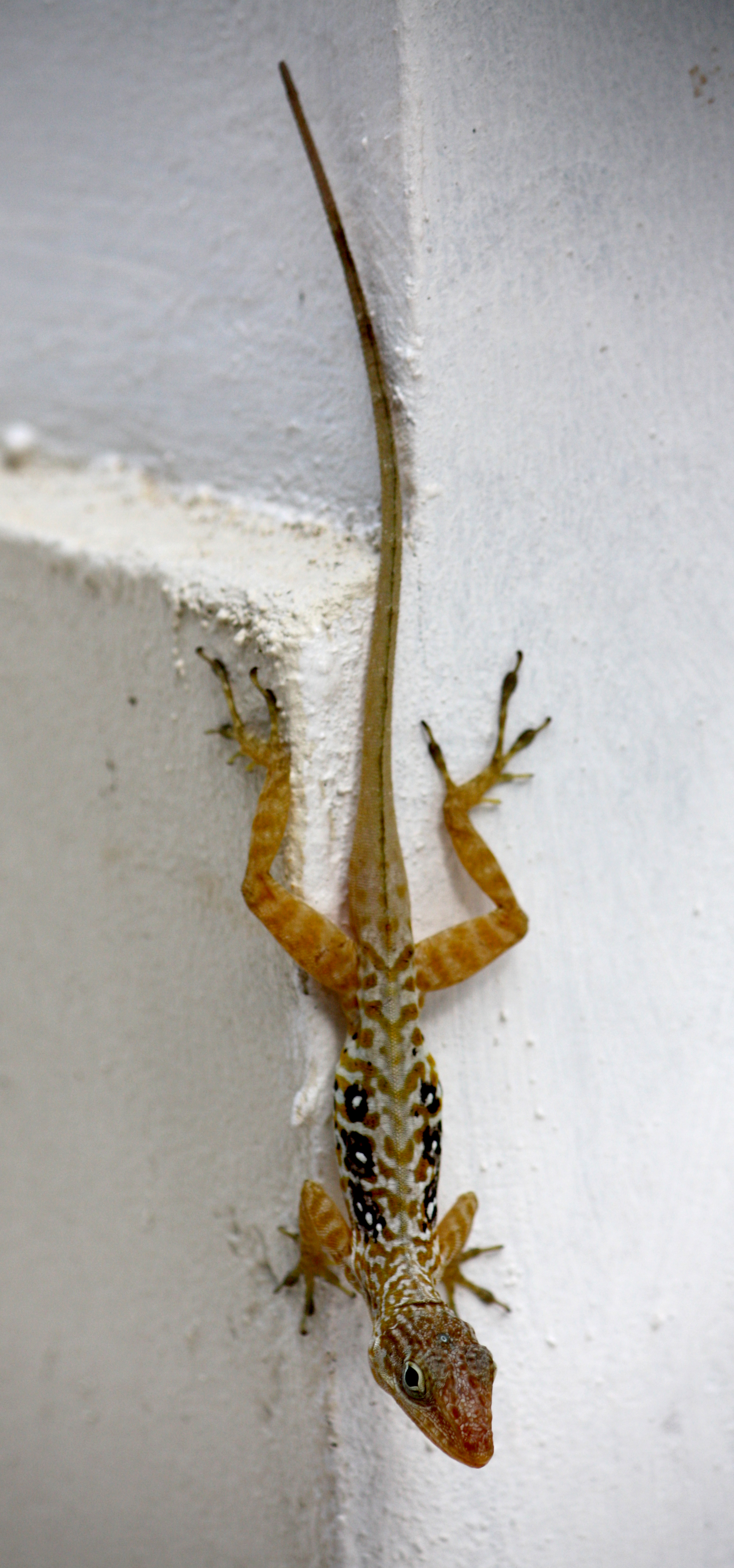
- A male Dominican anole in its typical perching position. North Caribbean ecotype. Coulibistrie, Dominica

Conservation status
- Near Threatened (IUCN 3.1)

Scientific classification
- Kingdom: Animalia
- Phylum: Chordata
- Class: Reptilia
- Order: Squamata
- Suborder: Iguania
- Family: Anolidae
- Genus: Anolis
- Species: A. oculatus

Binomial name
- Anolis oculatus (Cope, 1879)
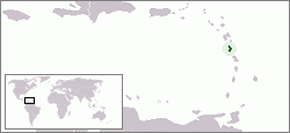
- Endemic to Dominica in the Lesser Antilles, a chain of islands in the Caribbean.

Synonyms
- Xiphosurus oculatus Cope, 1879; Anolis oculatus Garman, 1888; Ctenonotus oculatus Schwartz and Henderson, 1988; Anolis oculatus oculatus; Anolis oculatus cabritensis Lazell, 1962; Anolis oculatus montanus Lazell, 1962; Anolis oculatus winstonorum Lazell, 1962; Anolis oculatus winstoni Lazell, 1962, lapsus

= Anolis oculatus =

Species of reptile

Anolis oculatus, the Dominica anole, Dominican anole, eyed anole or zandoli, is a species of anole lizard. It is endemic to the Caribbean island of Dominica, where it is found in most environments. The species is found in a diverse range of color forms, which one herpetologist once classified as four subspecies, which most other scientists did not recognise because the forms gradually inter-grade with one another. Two later researchers have instead promoted the "ecotypes" concept, hypothesizing the color forms are maintained by the ecological conditions of the surrounding environment, despite being genetically indistinguishable. The morphology of some traits is subject to clinal variation, gradually changing from one side of the island to the other, or from sea level to the hilltops. The ground color ranges from pale tan or yellow to deep green or brown. It also has patterned markings that range from light-colored speckling to complex marbled patterns, and some populations also have large black-ringed "eye" spots on their flanks.

The Dominican anole spends much of the time in trees but mainly hunts on the ground. Small insects make up the bulk of its prey, with soft-bodied invertebrates and small vertebrates hunted less frequently. Long-living and late maturing for anoles, the Dominican anole can usually breed from around two to three months of age. Females lay eggs, and breeding can occur at any time of year. Clutches number one or rarely two eggs and are laid under rocks or leaves on the ground. Although presently widespread and common on Dominica, in 2007 some authors opined that it may face competition from A. cristatellus, an anole from Puerto Rico, which was introduced a few years earlier.

== History and taxonomy ==
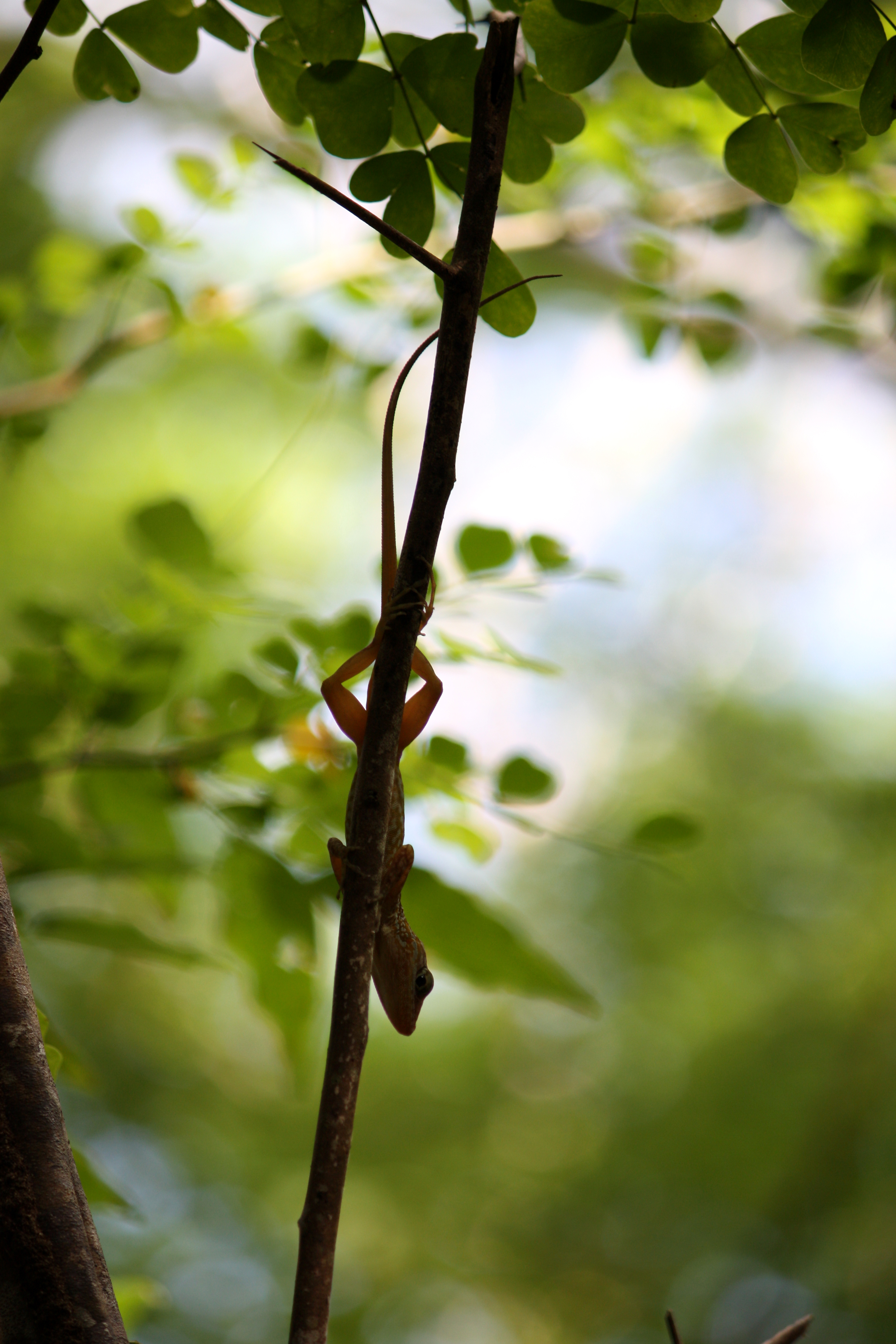
A Dominican anole clinging to a tree branch; during active periods, it typically faces downward to scan the ground for food, mates, and competitors. North Caribbean ecotype. Cabrits National Park, Dominica.

The Dominican anole is locally known as the zandoli, or tree lizard. The indigenous Island Caribs considered its presence in their home to be a sign of "good spirits" according to Honychurch.

According to Malhotra and Thorpe the American paleontologist and herpetologist Edward Drinker Cope gave a cursory description of Anolis alliaceus in 1864, which now seen as a synonym of the species A. marmoratus from another island, on the basis of sixteen specimens at the British Museum that lacked locality data. He later separately described Xiphosurus oculatus in 1879, from thirteen specimens in the U.S. National Museum (now the Smithsonian); the name oculatus (Latin, "eyed") refers to its distinctive lateral spots. The two taxa were synonymised in 1888 by the German-British zoologist Albert Günther.

Because of the variation in colour there was some question as to whether the Dominican anole comprised multiple species or only one. The American herpetologist James D. Lazell, Jr. attempted to explain this variation in a 1962 publication. In 1959 he had travelled on foot or on horseback throughout the island, collecting over 500 specimens from thirty localities on Dominica. From this, he concluded that it was a single species, and accounted for its variation by classifying the spectrum of different color forms as four subspecies organised by region: A. o. oculatus, found along the southwestern coastal area, with a holotype from the capital of Roseau (most closely corresponding to the original type described by Cope); A. o. cabritensis, along the northwest coast, with a holotype from the Cabrits peninsula (now Cabrits National Park); A. o. montanus, in central, high elevation rain forest, with a holotype from Fresh Water Lake; and A. o. winstoni, along the northeast coast, with a holotype from the village of Woodford Hill. These first descriptions applied only to males, however, and omitted certain morphological features such as scale variation. Lazell returned to Dominica in 1966 to collect new specimens, and in 1972 supplemented his original descriptions, including color illustrations of sexual dimorphism among the types.

Lazell noted that the subspecies he described corresponded with the "strikingly different" ecological zones on Dominica, which result from the elevations on the small island interacting with prevailing winds to produce varying rainfall and vegetation. Later morphological and molecular studies determined, however, that there was no interruption to gene flow between the different populations, but instead clinal variation where individual lizards differed incrementally from each other to produce very different forms from one end of the island to the other. Researchers have, therefore, determined that there is no basis for the use of subspecies nomenclature. The former subspecies have been described as "ecotypes" by Malhotra and Thorpe based on their geographic range: the south Caribbean ecotype corresponds to the former A. o. oculatus; north Caribbean ecotype to A. o. cabritensis; montane ecotype to A. o. montanus; and Atlantic ecotype to A. o. winstoni.

== Description ==
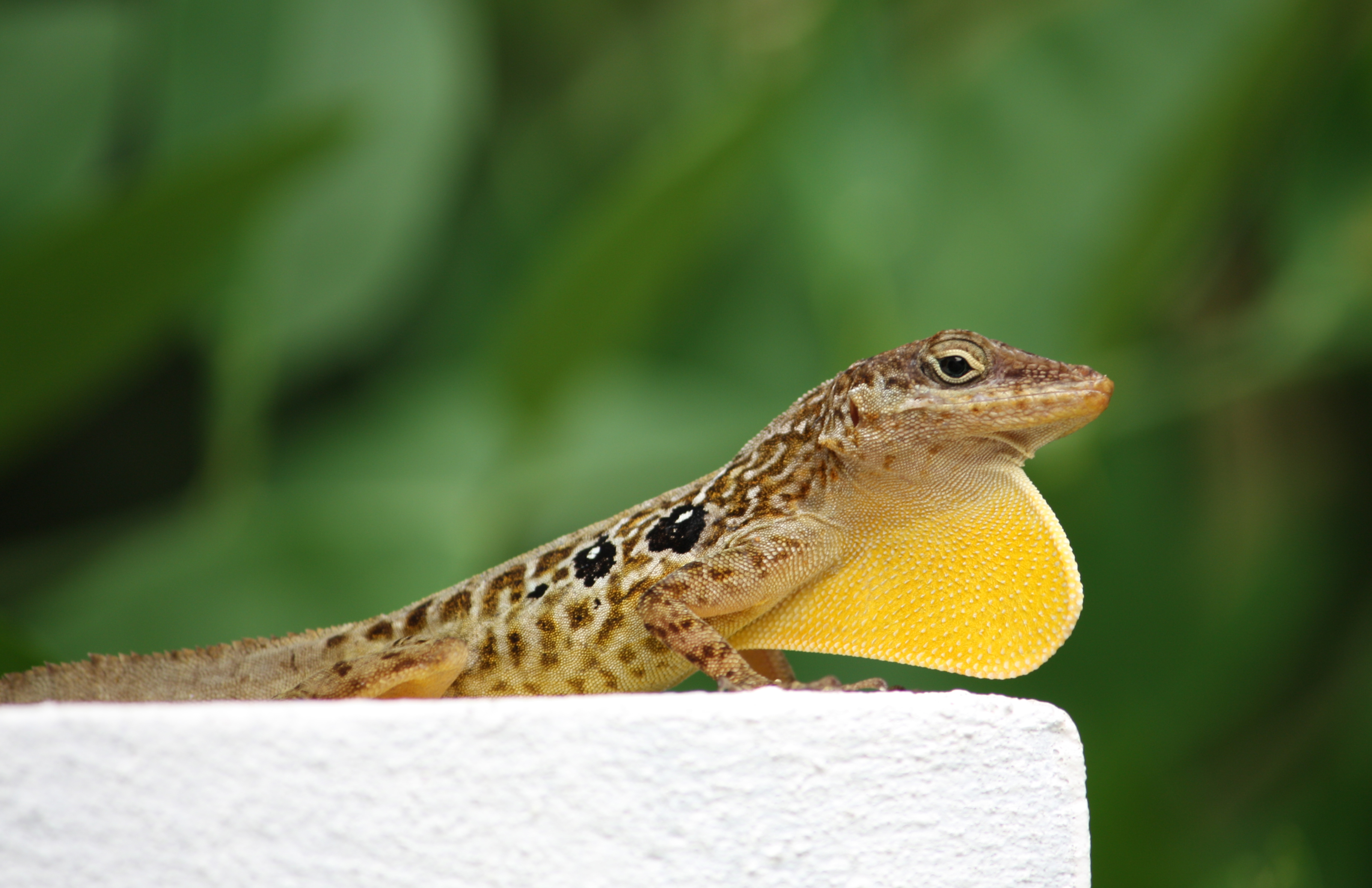
A male Dominican anole extends its throat fan (dewlap). North Caribbean ecotype. Coulibistrie, Dominica.

The Dominican anole is medium-sized for anoles, with a maximum snout-vent-length (SVL) in males of 61–98 mm (2.4–3.9 in) depending on the population (with larger sizes correlating with higher altitudes), and tails of at least equal length; females are smaller in all populations. Adult males have a tail crest and a prominent, extensible throat fan that is often a bright yellow or orange. The throat fan is only rudimentary in females, and less brightly colored. Some may have bright blue eyes. Dominican anoles are capable of slight color change, but not as much as some other anoles.

Their ground color varies from pale tan or ash gray to deep brown or green. Markings also vary significantly. Adult males in all populations have some combination of white or light-colored spotting distributed over most of their bodies. This manifests in different populations as small, evenly distributed spots; scattered groups of white scales; or streaks that run together in a marbled appearance. Males in some populations additionally have larger lateral spots ringed by irregularly shaped black splotches. Markings on females and juveniles are significantly lighter or less distinct, and black spots are extremely uncommon. Females and juveniles may additionally have lateral streaks or mid-dorsal stripes.

The cause of the variability of the anole has been the subject of much study. Its morphological traits vary independently from each other, such that the presence of one trait does not predict the presence of another. Some traits vary altitudinally and others longitudinally, or may correlate with ecological factors such as rainfall and vegetation type. Populations in drier habitats tend to be paler in color with marbled or blotched markings, while those in wetter habitats are deeper green, hence the usage of the term "ecotype" by Malhotra et al.. The same patterns are also seen in the highly variable A. marmoratus on Guadeloupe, a neighboring island group that has a range of habitats comparable to Dominica.

=== Ecotype descriptions ===
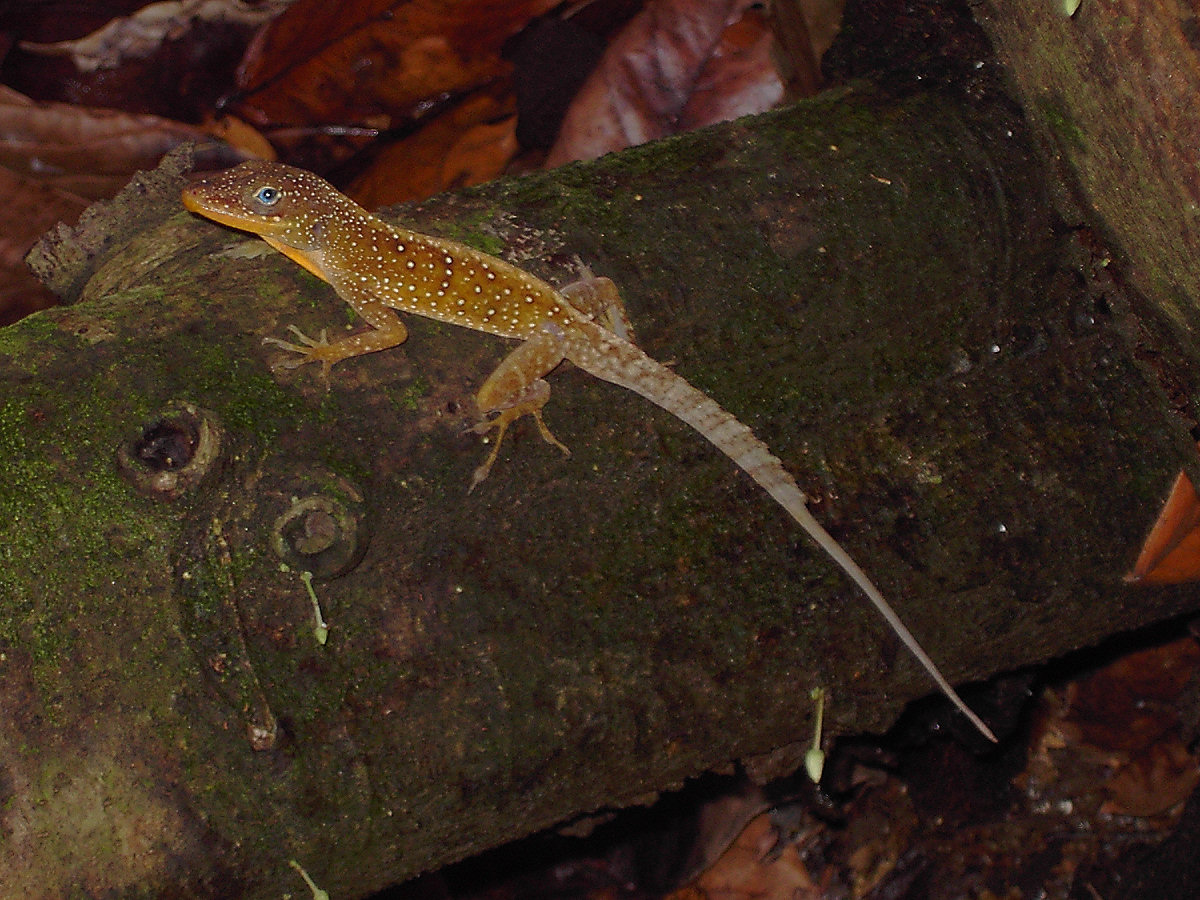
Atlantic ecotype. Woodford Hill, Dominica.

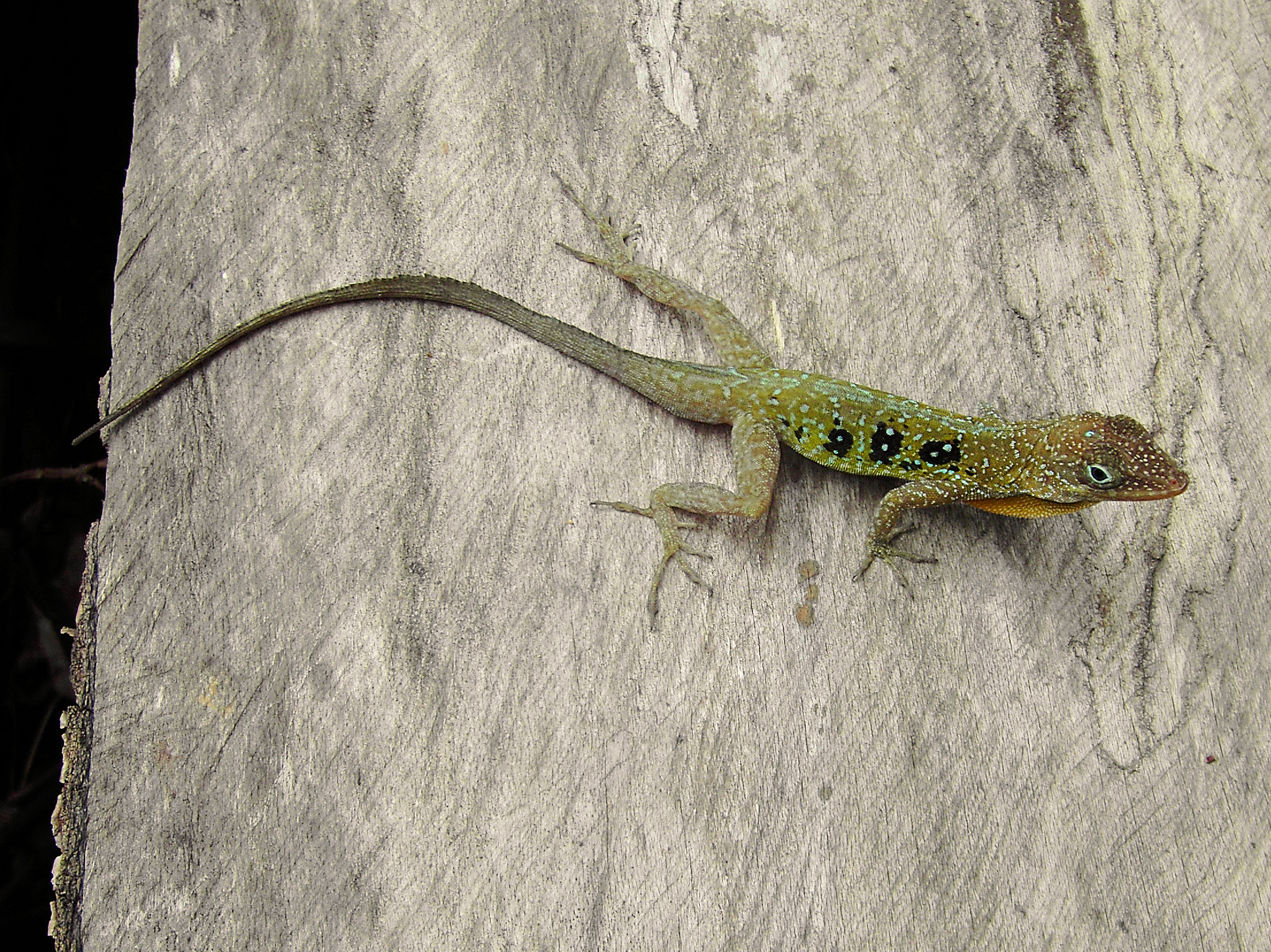
Mountain ecotype. Near Syndicate Waterfall, Dominica.

The north Caribbean ecotype (of which extremely divergent individuals were formerly classified as A. o. cabritensis) is found in the most arid part of Dominica, in low, scrub-like woodland on the northwest, Caribbean coast. It can have the most complex markings of any population, with bold, light-colored spots that run together to form irregular stripes or marbling. Males commonly have a series of prominent, lateral black splotches. Its ground color is predominantly gray or pale yellow brown, sometimes with a darker, occasionally reddish head region.

The south Caribbean ecotype (A. o. oculatus) is found on the south and southwest coast, which does not differ significantly from the north. It is the smallest in size and the palest in color and markings. It has a light tan to yellow ground color, with varying white spots that are typically indistinct. Lateral dark splotches are inconspicuous or absent. This ecotype is threatened by an invasive species (see Conservation).

The montane ecotype (A. o. montanus) is found in high elevation rain forest located in central Dominica. It has a deep green ground color, which matches the moss-covered tree trunks on which they are mostly found. They have small, bluish-white secondary spots, and occasional lateral, black-ringed splotches on males like those found in the north Caribbean ecotype. The largest sizes are attained among this population.

The Atlantic ecotype (A. o. winstoni) is found along most of the Atlantic (east) coast of Dominica, which is wetter than the west coast. It is intermediate in size, and has a typically orange to chocolate brown ground color, with small, scattered white spots, like the montane type.

== Distribution and habitat ==
The Dominican anole is restricted to the island of Dominica, one of the few islands in the Lesser Antilles to have retained its original reptile and amphibian fauna over the last 200 years. It is one of two lizard species endemic to Dominica, the other being the Dominican ground lizard. It is the only native anole species on Dominica. It is present in all habitats and areas of the island up to around 900 m elevation and is generally abundant, though it is tending towards extirpation from the southwestern coastal region due to an invasive anole species (see Conservation). The coastal woodlands of Dominica have been particularly noted as unusually favorable for reptiles, with a biomass among the highest recorded for terrestrial reptile populations; Dominican anoles have been estimated to occur in that environment at a mean density of 2148 per hectare.

== Ecology ==
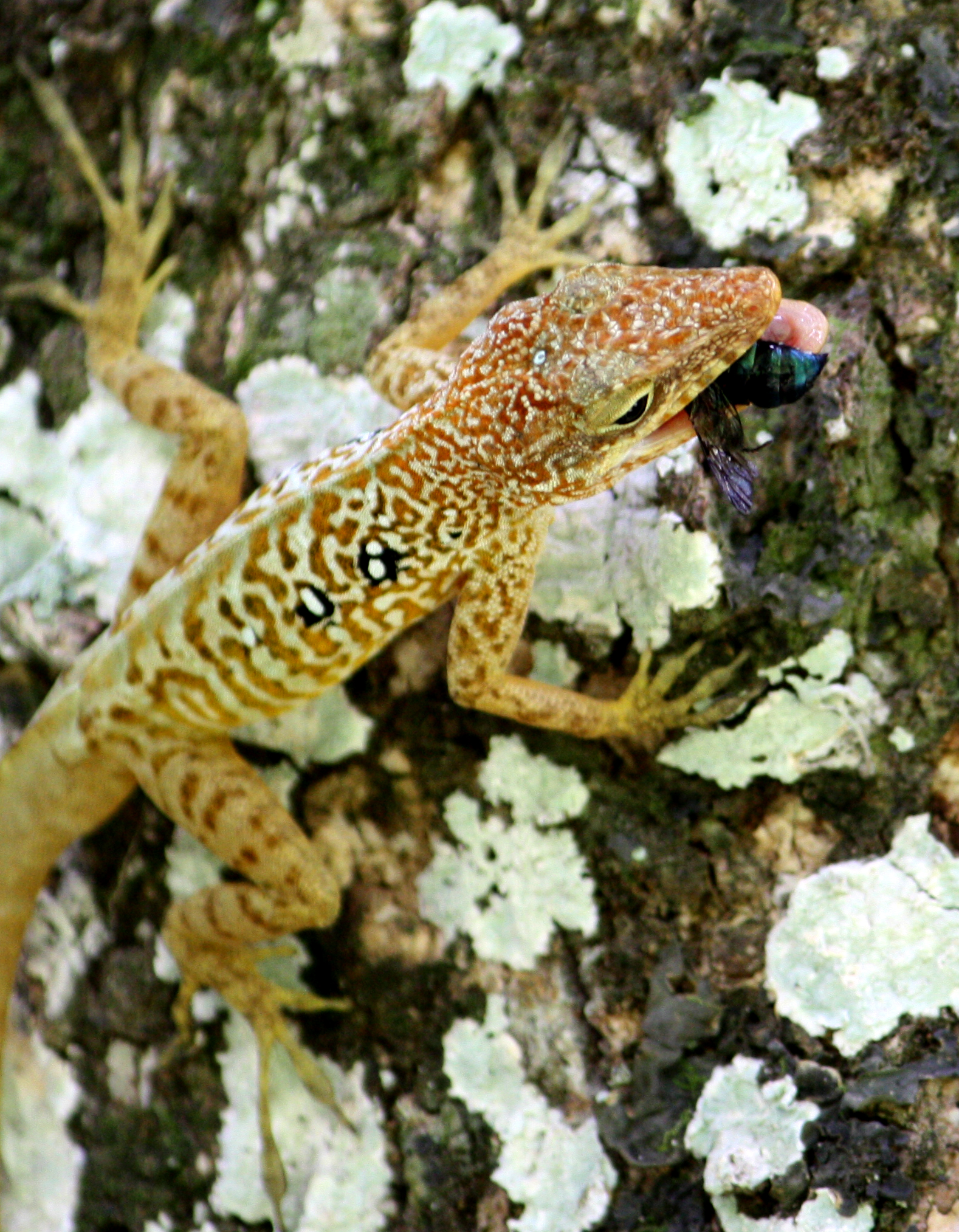
Male Dominican anole feeding on a fly. North Caribbean ecotype. Near the Coulibistrie River, Dominica.

Dominican anoles are semi-arboreal, and mainly forage on the ground for food. Its diet mainly consists of insects, but varies by habitat and season based on the available food, and with the size of the individual. It may also eat fruit and even small vertebrates. In xeric woodland habitats on Dominica's Caribbean coast, it mainly feeds on tiny ants, termites, springtails and barklice. Montane populations, which reach larger sizes, rely more on larger prey such as Oligochaeta (earthworms) and Orthoptera (crickets and grasshoppers), although smaller adults and juveniles in rainforest environments will also mainly feed on ants.

The main predators of Dominican anoles are Alsophis antillensis, a species of "racer" snake, and birds including the mangrove cuckoo, thrashers, and kingbirds, all of which are mainly found in coastal regions.

== Behavior ==
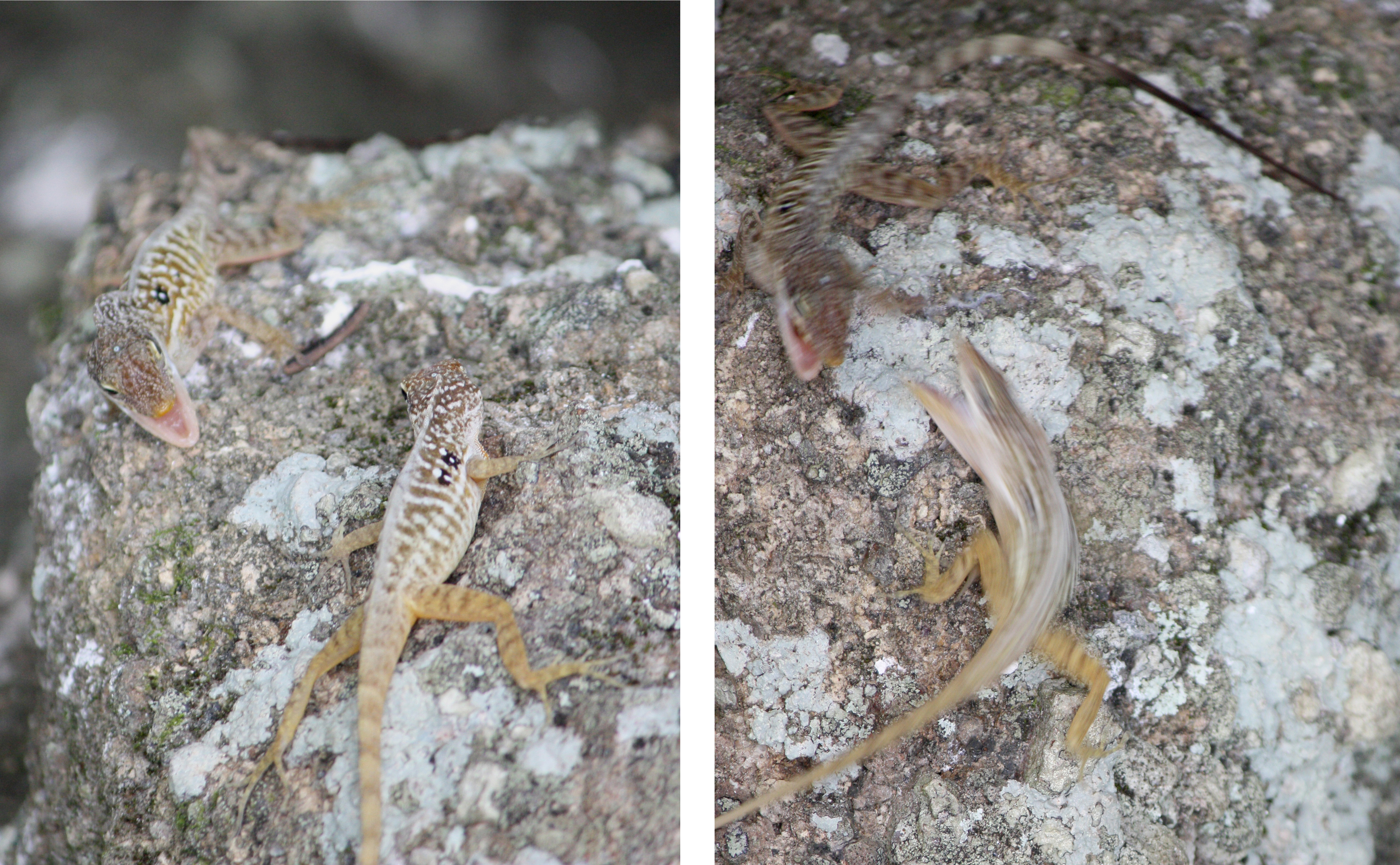
Two male Dominican anoles in a territorial confrontation. North Caribbean ecotype. Coulibistrie, Dominica. Following display behavior involving head-bobbing, throat fan extension, and push-ups, the males circled close on one another with their mouths gaping, occasionally snapping at each other until one retreated.

Both males and females are territorial. Male territories are roughly twice the size of female territories, and males will typically mate with females with overlapping territory. Female territories may overlap in areas with high population densities. Research has shown gene flow within the species to be determined by male migration, which suggests that females do not have significant mate choice preferences. Migration probably occurs during the juvenile stage, as male and female adults are mostly sedentary.

During active periods, Dominican anoles typically perch on a tree or other vertical object, facing downwards to scan the ground for food or other lizards, though this perch makes them vulnerable to predators. From this perch, males will extend and retract their brightly colored throat fans, both to attract mates and to ward off competitors. Males will also bob their heads or perform what look like "push-ups" using their front legs. An invading male may cause a confrontation, during which they will circle at close quarters, inflating their bodies and gaping their mouths to appear larger and menacing. Physical contact during these confrontations is unusual and brief when it occurs, rarely resulting in physical injury. The invader will usually retreat after these confrontations even if it is larger than the defending male.

Activity patterns vary between populations, though the species as a whole is generally most active during the cooler hours of the day. In xeric woodland on Dominica's west coast, it is active throughout the day with peaks at dawn and dusk, while in rain forest populations, it is typically inactive during the middle of the day, remaining at high perches. At night, the Dominican anole climbs to the tips of branches and sleeps clinging to leaves, where heavier nocturnal predators cannot reach them.

Dominican anoles in some populations are very tolerant of humans, allowing them to approach closely before retreating. It will seek shelter under stones or other ground litter.

== Life cycle and reproduction ==
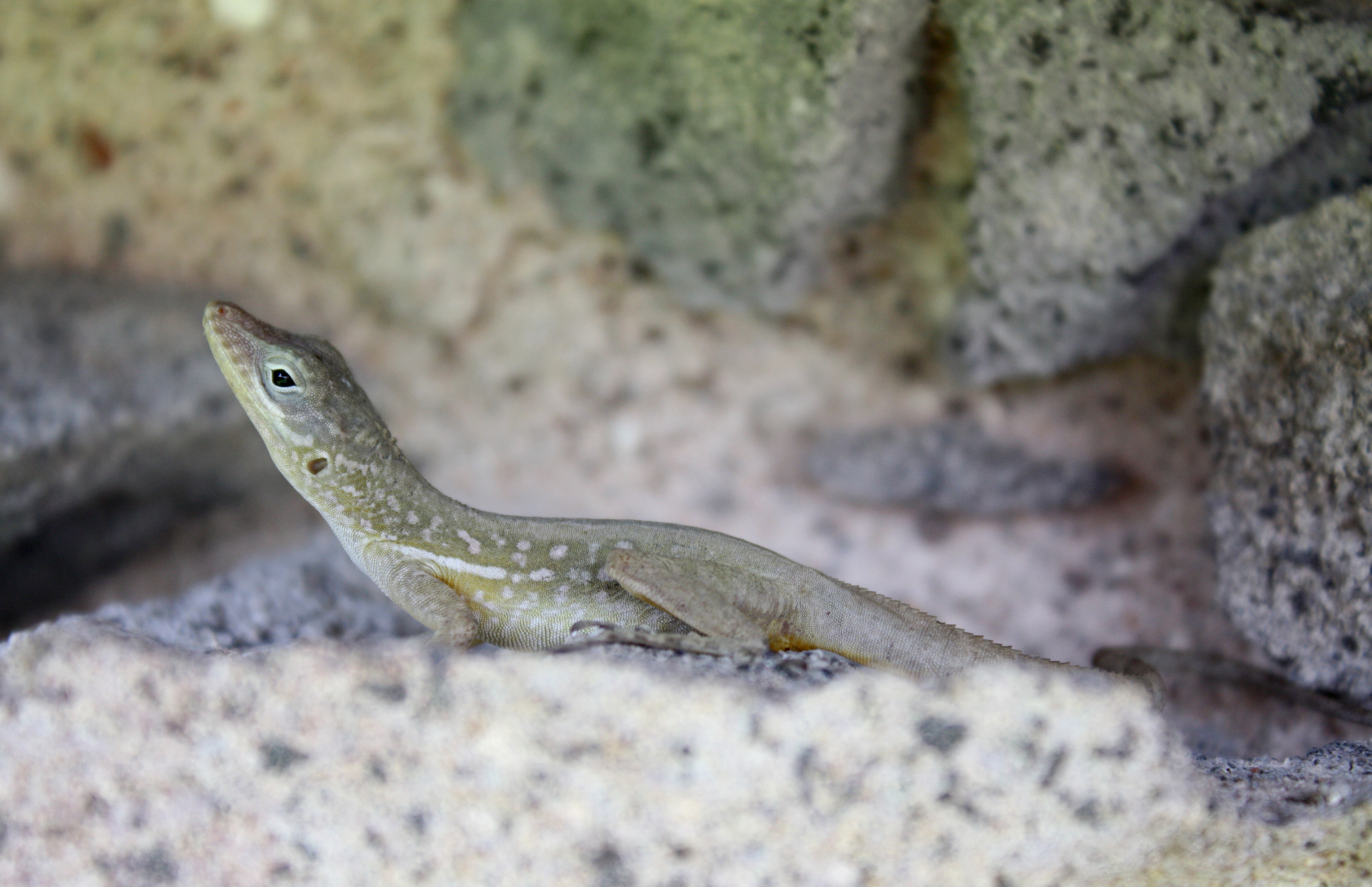
Female Dominican anole. North Caribbean ecotype. Cabrits National Park, Dominica.

Dominican anoles are relatively long-living and late maturing compared to mainland anole species. Males mature at a size of 35 mm SVL, and females mature at 40 mm SVL, which they are likely to attain at an age of two or three months old. They breed throughout the year, with a peak at the end of the dry season, particularly in areas such as the north Caribbean coast that have more seasonal rainfall variation. Females are oviparous, and lay multiple clutches of eggs each year, with a short period between clutches. Females in captivity have produced eggs every 14 days. Each clutch typically contains only one egg, though clutches of two can occur without apparent relationship to season, location, or size of the females. Egg production alternates ovaries and overlaps cycles, with one ovary ending its cycle after the opposite ovary has begun. Eggs are laid sheltered under ground litter such as rocks or leaves.

== Evolutionary relationships ==
Anoles in the Caribbean have been extensively studied as "one of the best known cases of adaptive radiation." Schneider et al. in 2002 classified this anole as part of a "bimaculatus series" of Caribbean anoles, which are found on Dominica and islands to its north in the Lesser Antilles, and are more closely related to other Caribbean anoles than to South American anoles. Lazell in 1972 considered the Dominican anole "the most bizarre member" of what he described as a "bimaculatus group, and one of the most peculiar members of its huge and diverse genus". Its karyotype is unique among that group, as it possesses two pairs of acrocentric macrochromosomes. On this basis, Lazell hypothesized that it "long evolved in isolation, and lacks genuinely close relatives".

Within the bimaculatus series, it has been classified by an author(?) as belonging to the Guadeloupean-Dominican clade, which includes A. marmoratus on the Guadeloupe Archipelago, A. lividus on Montserrat, A. nubilus on Redonda, and A. sabanus on Saba. A. marmoratus terraealtae, found only on the island of Les Saintes located in between Dominica and the main islands of Guadeloupe, may be more closely related to the Dominican anole than to other A. marmoratus subspecies. A. leachi, found on Antigua and Barbuda, is a likely sister taxon to the Guadeloupean-Dominican clade.

== Genetics ==
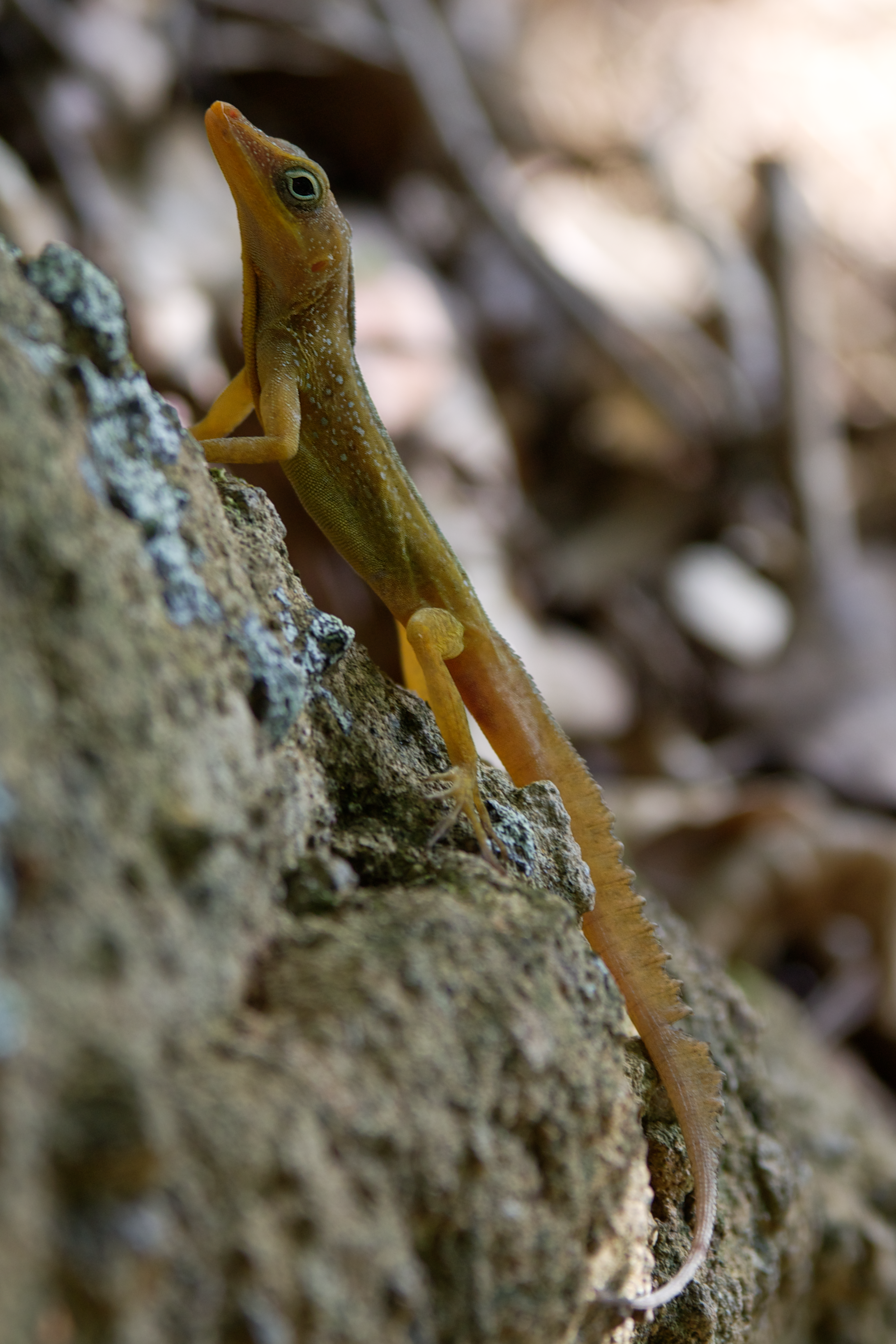
Male Dominican Anole. South Caribbean ecotype

Levels of gene flow are relatively high in Dominican anole populations over large areas of Dominica, even between different ecotype populations and different members of mitochondrial DNA (mtDNA) lineages. This gene flow appears to be dominated by male migration, and occurs at such high levels as to likely prevent evolutionary divergence of different populations.

Morphological variation of the different populations, i.e. the different color phases here called "ecotypes", deviate from each other in clinal patterns that are sometimes more abrupt, which means color forms or slight differences in anatomy flow into each other gradually, but the presence of specific forms are also influenced by environmental variables such as rainfall and vegetation type. These patterns of variation are also generally inconsistent with mtDNA lineages. This variation is thought to primarily be the result of strong pressures from natural selection caused by differences in habitat, with phenotypic plasticity a possible, though less important, contributing factor.

The populations on the west coast are an exception, and there is apparently a large barrier to gene flow between the north Caribbean and south Caribbean populations. Although ecological conditions appear constant from north to south, there is a transition occurring over just a few kilometers from the northern coast from the northern form to the southern ecotype, with the genetic difference between the two populations relatively larger than predicted from their geographic distance. This separation may be the result of a volcanic event within the last 50,000 years, as the transition zone is marked by relatively recent lava flows.

== Conservation ==
The Dominican anole is threatened by an introduced competitor, Anolis cristatellus, which established itself in Dominica between 1997 and 2002, and as of 2007 had begun to supplant it in the southwestern coastal area surrounding the capital, Roseau. Within this area the Dominican anole has become absent or rare. Because that is almost the entire range of the southern ecotype, some authors recommended a captive breeding program to preserve this color form. These authors furthermore fear that the Dominican anole may eventually face extirpation from much of Dominica, except for specific environments that A. cristatellus tends not to prefer, such as forests or mountainous areas.

== See also ==
- List of amphibians and reptiles of Dominica
