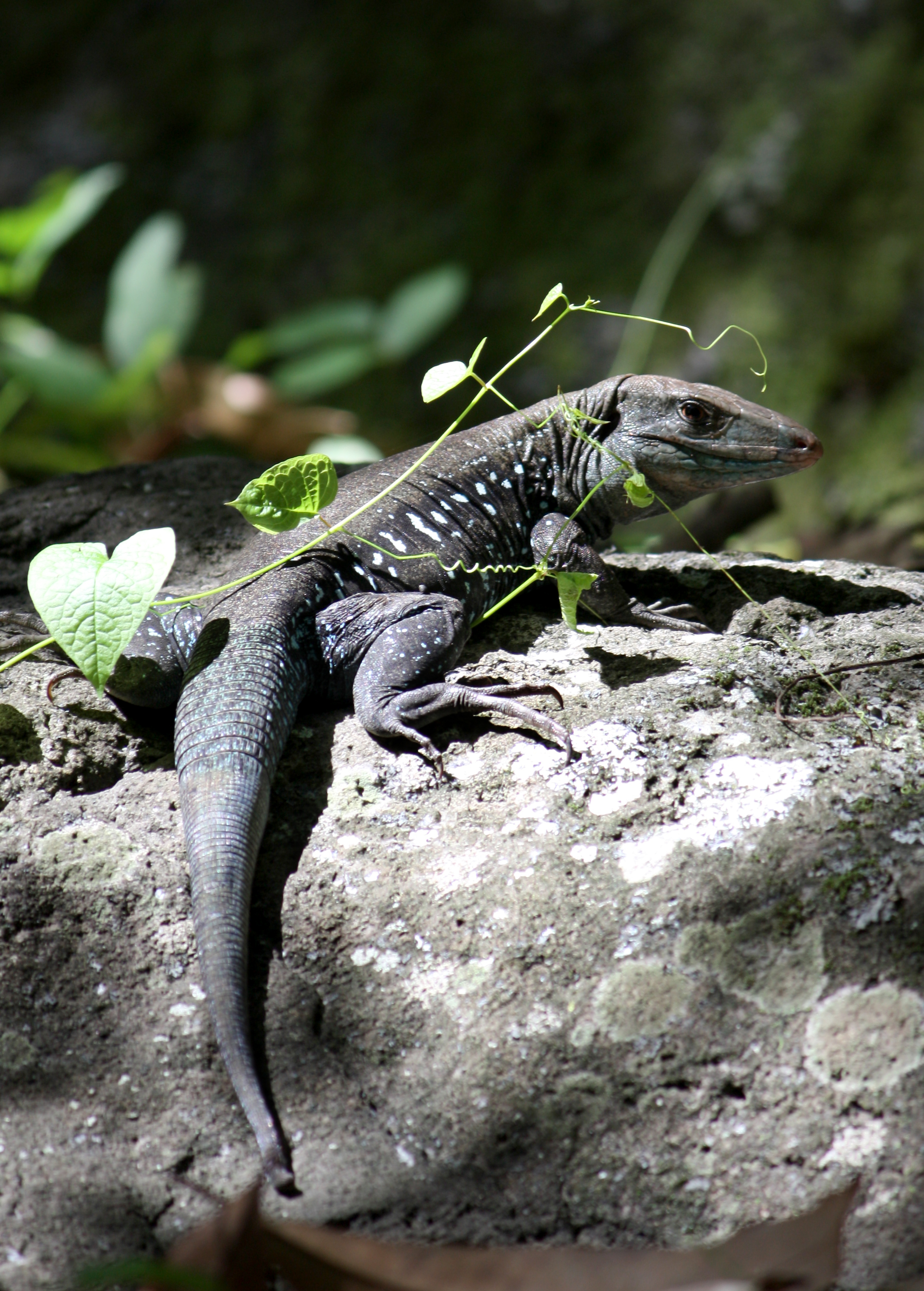
- An adult male near the Coulibistrie River, Dominica.

Conservation status
- Least Concern (IUCN 3.1)

Scientific classification
- Kingdom: Animalia
- Phylum: Chordata
- Class: Reptilia
- Order: Squamata
- Family: Teiidae
- Genus: Pholidoscelis
- Species: P. fuscatus

Binomial name
- Pholidoscelis fuscatus (Garman, 1887)
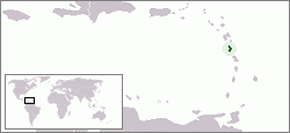
- Endemic to Dominica in the Lesser Antilles, a chain of islands in the Caribbean.

Synonyms
- Ameiva fuscata Garman, 1887

= Dominican ground lizard =

Species of lizard

The Dominican ground lizard or Dominican ameiva (Pholidoscelis fuscatus) is a species of lizard. It is endemic to the Caribbean island of Dominica, an island noted for its intact and abundant reptile population, where it is most commonly found in dry coastal woodland.

Adults are mostly blue-gray, and can reach lengths up to 400 mm from snout to tail. They are omnivorous, feeding on fallen fruit, carrion, and small animals including other lizards.

== History ==
The Dominican ground lizard is locally known as the abòlò. The indigenous Kalinago used to stew it as a remedy for certain illnesses.

The species was first described in 1887 by Samuel Garman, the assistant director of herpetology and ichthyology at Harvard's Museum of Comparative Zoology. The three cotype specimens, all males of varying ages, were acquired by the Museum in 1879, and were collected from Dominica during the "Blake expeditions" conducted by William Healy Dall.

== Description ==
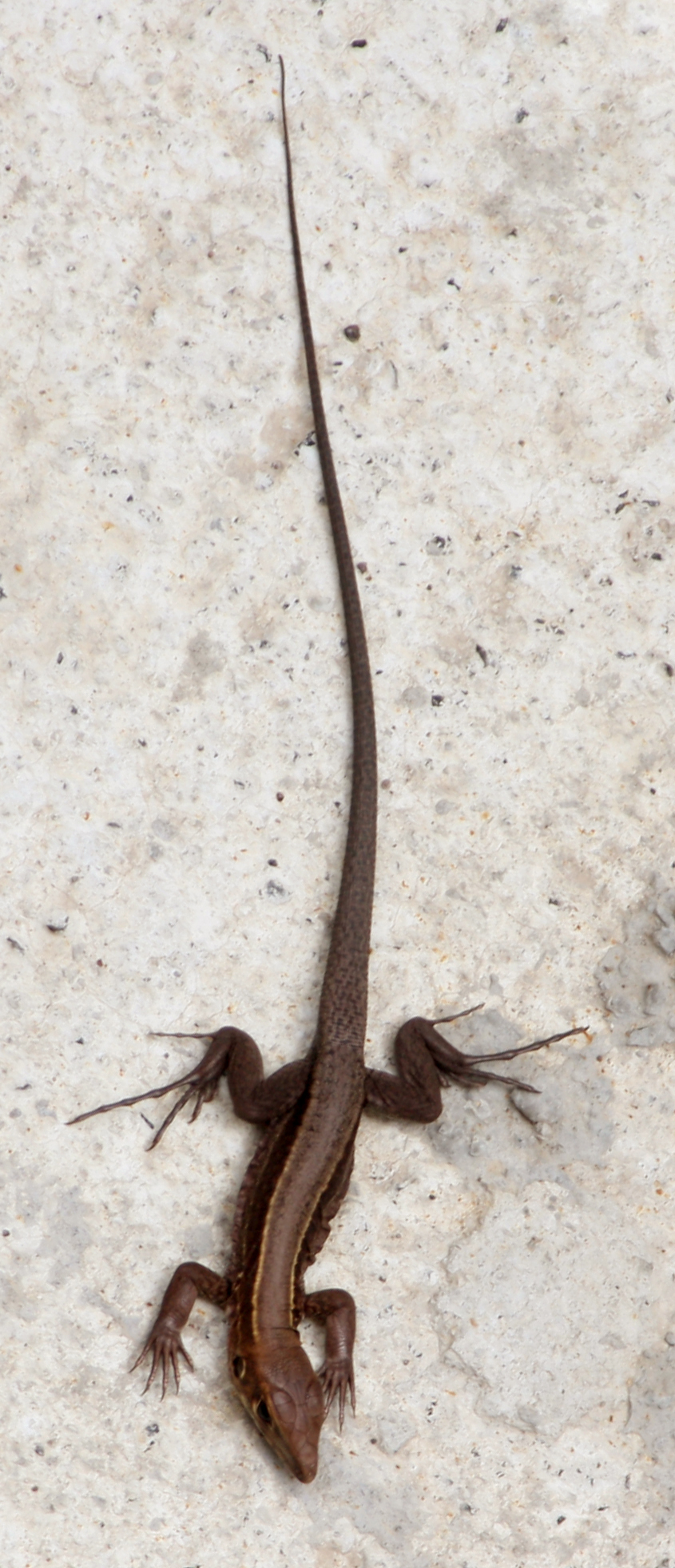
Juvenile, viewed from above. Coulibistrie, Dominica.

Adult Dominican ground lizards have bright blue spots on their flanks and inner thighs, and a gray or sometimes reddish-brown dorsal surface that is flecked with black. They have a pale blue ventral surface, with dark blue-gray on the throat and chest. They exhibit little sexual dichromatism, apart from a tendency in the males to be more uniformly blue-gray. Adult males can reach a snout–vent length (SVL) of up to 200 mm, females up to 154 mm SVL, with their tails about the same length. Adult males also have broader heads and jowls.

Juveniles appear markedly different from adults and are impossible to sex from simple observation. They are coppery-brown overall, with a dark brown lateral stripe on each side bounded by yellow lines. These stripes have yellow flecks and spots that turn blue as it matures. Juveniles are often confused with adult Gymnophthalmus pleii and Mabuya mabouya, two other lizard species present in the same habitat, because they are fast moving and of similar coloration and size. The latter two may be differentiated from juvenile Dominican ground lizards by their shinier skin and less differentiated, snake-like head and body.

== Distribution and habitat ==
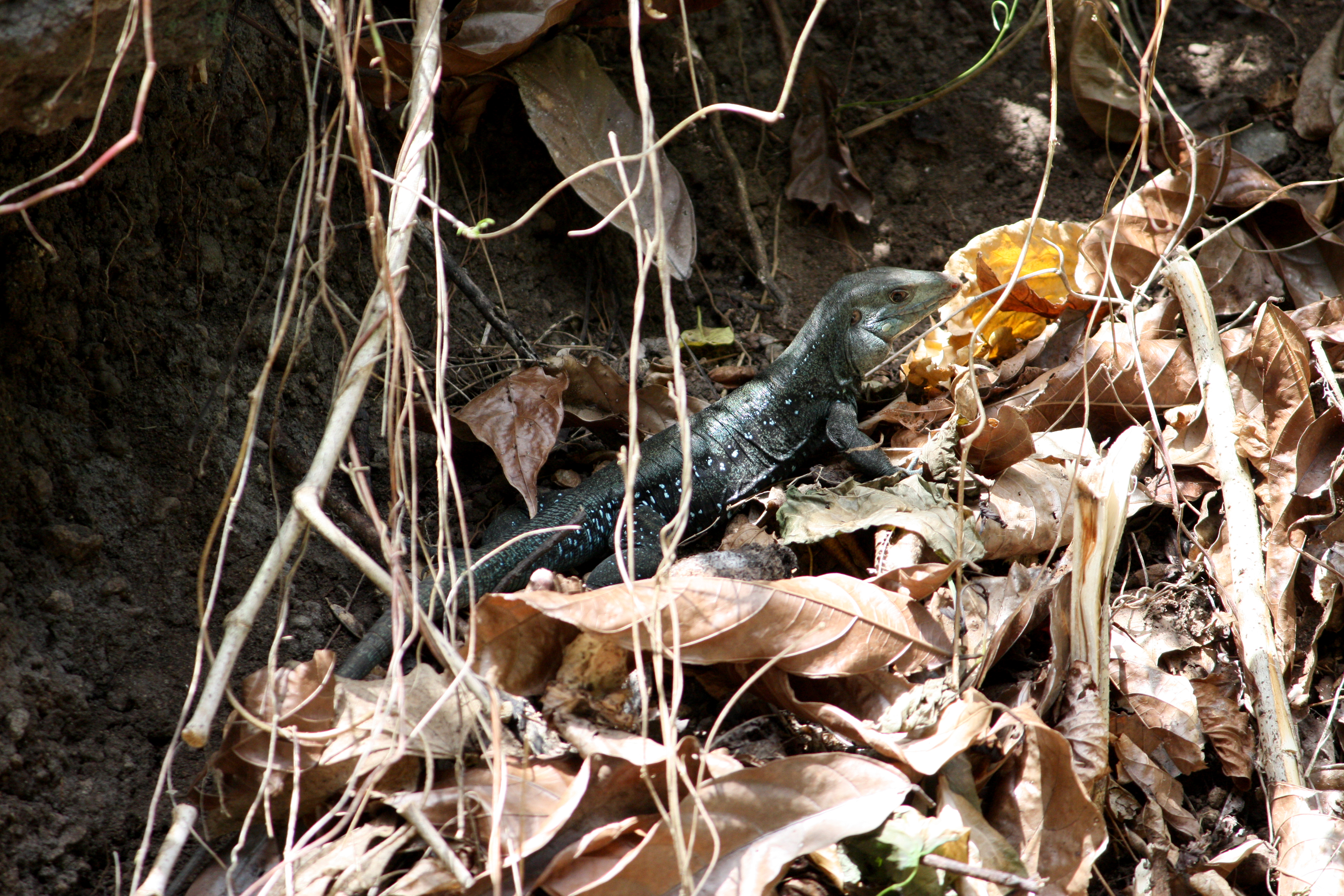
Dominican ground lizard foraging in leaf litter. Near the Coulibistrie River, Dominica.

The Dominican ground lizard is restricted to the island of Dominica, one of the few islands in the Lesser Antilles to have retained its original reptile and amphibian fauna over the last 200 years. It is one of two lizard species endemic to Dominica, the other being the Dominican anole. It is fairly common on Dominica, with a habitat including dry coastal woodland and scrub, littoral woodland, and cultivated land below around 300 m elevation. The coastal woodlands of Dominica have been noted as unusually favorable for reptiles, with a biomass among the highest recorded for terrestrial reptile populations; Dominican ground lizards have been estimated to occur in that environment at a mean density of 379 per hectare. Its range is also expanding to higher elevations, as more rain forest on Dominica is cleared for agricultural development.

== Diet ==
Dominican ground lizards are omnivorous. They forage through forest litter for fallen fruit such as mangoes, scavenge for carrion, and may also hunt invertebrates or other small lizards. It is known to eat the eggs, embryos, and hatchlings of the endangered Lesser Antillean Iguana. They apparently avoid eating carrion of their own species.

== Behavior and reproduction ==
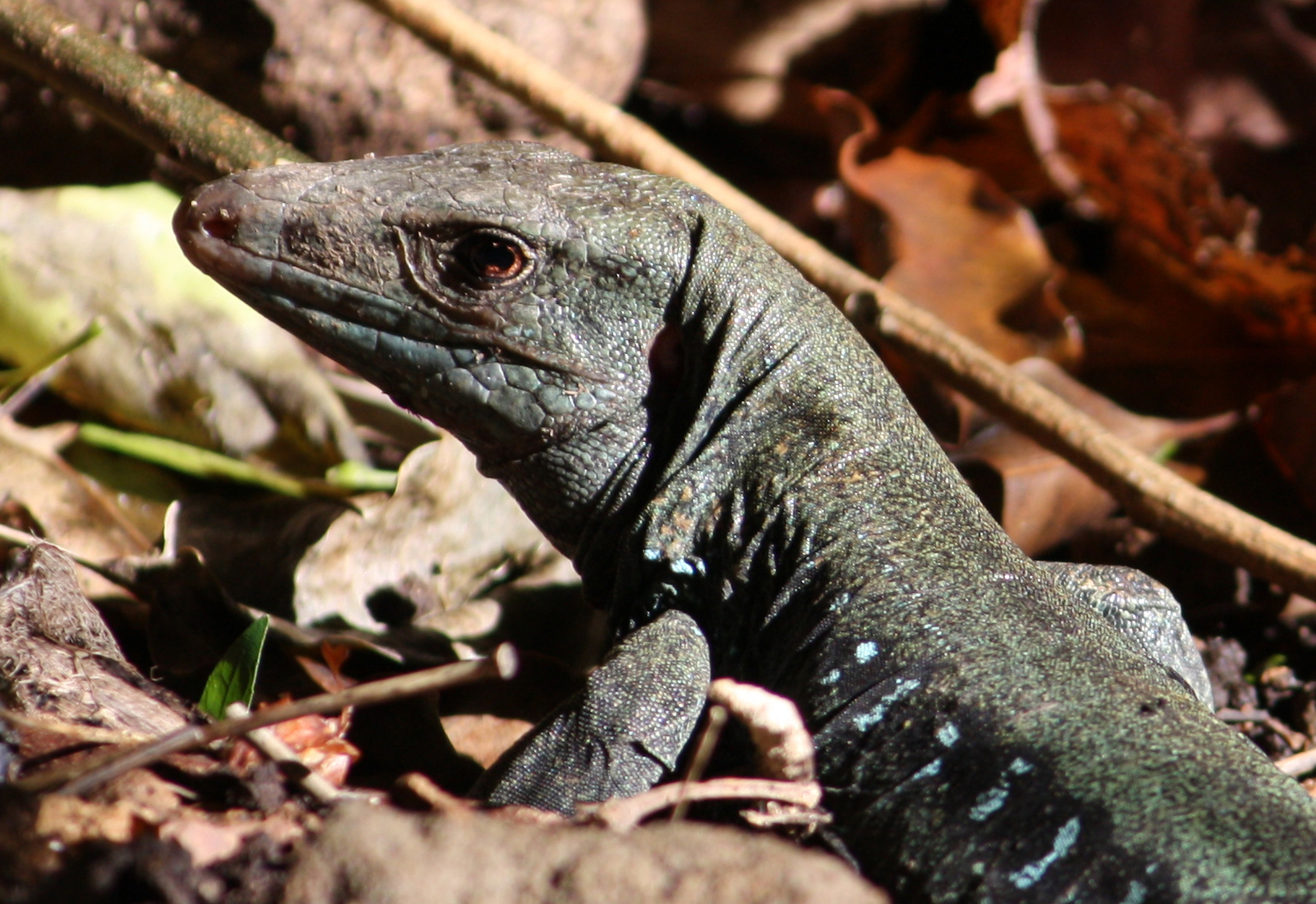
Closeup of head of Dominican ground lizard. On "Jack's Walk" trail, leading to top of Morne Bruce from Dominica Botanical Gardens, Roseau, Dominica.

Dominican ground lizards are heliothermic, and are usually only observed during the hottest part of the day. They are generally terrestrial, but have been observed climbing trees to heights over 1.5 m, possibly to hunt; this behavior has been described in at least two other species.

Males mature at a size of 94 mm SVL, and females mature at 105 mm. They do not have a restricted breeding season, but instead reproduce year-round. It is estimated that they lay two or three clutches of eggs each year. Each clutch contains about four eggs, with the number of eggs tending to increase with the size of the female.

== Conservation ==
Though many of its relatives on neighboring islands have gone extinct, the Dominican ground lizard continues to flourish, possibly owing to the absence of the mongoose on Dominica. Researchers have noted, however, that it may be especially vulnerable to the alteration and fragmentation of its habitat, caused by the continued clearing of forest on Dominica for agricultural uses and consequent erosion. An increase in the use of spraying of banana and tree crop plantations may also pose a threat.

== See also ==
- List of amphibians and reptiles of Dominica
