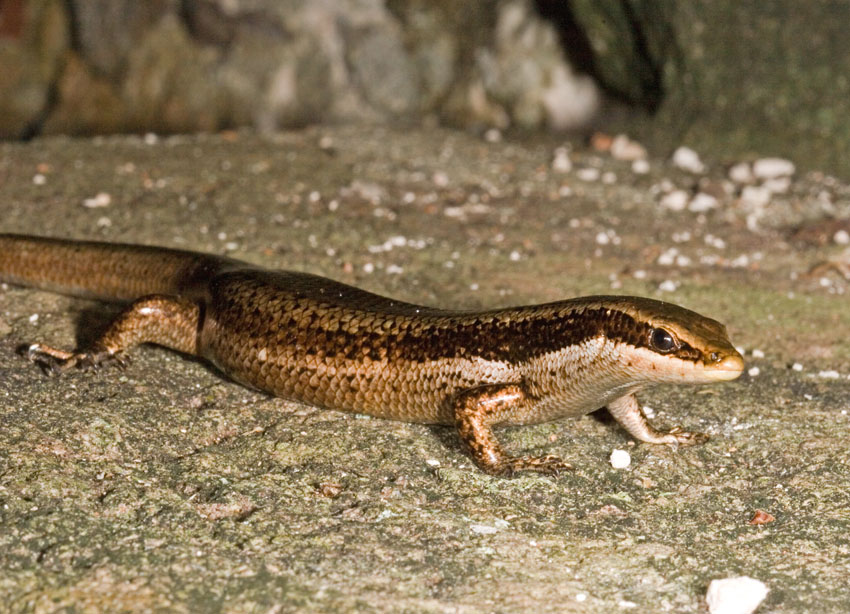
- at Cabrits National Park, Dominica.

Conservation status
- Least Concern (IUCN 3.1)

Scientific classification
- Kingdom: Animalia
- Phylum: Chordata
- Class: Reptilia
- Order: Squamata
- Suborder: Scinciformata
- Infraorder: Scincomorpha
- Family: Mabuyidae
- Genus: Mabuya
- Species: M. dominicana

Binomial name
- Mabuya dominicana Garman, 1887

= Mabuya dominicana =

Species of lizard

The Dominica skink (Mabuya dominicana) is a species of skink endemic to Dominica. On Dominica, it can be confused with Gymnophthalmus pleii or juvenile Ameiva fuscata due to their similar appearance.
