= Eleutherodactylus amplinympha =

Conservation status
- Endangered (IUCN 3.1)

Scientific classification
- Kingdom: Animalia
- Phylum: Chordata
- Class: Amphibia
- Order: Anura
- Clade: Brachycephaloidea
- Family: Eleutherodactylidae
- Genus: Eleutherodactylus
- Species: E. amplinympha

Binomial name
- Eleutherodactylus amplinympha Kaiser, Green & Schmid, 1994

Species of frog

Eleutherodactylus amplinympha, known commonly as the Dominica frog (Note: Also as the Dominican whistling frog, the Dominican rain frog or the Dominican piping frog.) or the Dominican gounouj, is a species of frog in the family Eleutherodactylidae. It is endemic to Dominica, in the Lesser Antilles, where it occurs in the interior of the island at elevations of 300–1,200 m (980–3,940 ft) above sea level. The species is a habitat generalist with a preference for slightly open rainforests at higher elevations.

== Taxonomy ==
The first description of the species was published in 1994 by Hinrich Kaiser, David M. Green and Michael Schmid. The holotype was collected in 1992 by Kaiser and Timothy F. Sharbel, with the type locality being Freshwater Lake, Dominica.

E.amplinypha has no recognized subspecies.

== Etymology ==
The name amplinympha is derived from the Latin words amplus, meaning large, and nympha, meaning Nymph. It was chosen in reference to the large size of the species females and the fact that males, while often being heard calling, are rarely seen because their habitat is regularly covered in dense fog.

The common name Dominican gounouj is a local Dominican one.

== Description and behaviour ==
Females of the species often reach over 35 mm (1.4 in) in snout–vent length, and some reach lengths of over 50 mm (2.0 in). Males are smaller, with the biggest one recorded having a length of 26.4 mm (1.04 in). The frog has large, prominent eyes on a flat-topped head that is longer than it is wide and wider than the frog's body is. The forearms are moderately robust, with long, slender fingers, while the hind legs are long and moderately robust, with long toes.

Colouration varies greatly, with neither males nor females having any exclusive variants. The frog's back may be coloured light or dark brown, cream, pink, orange, red or olive, and may have a pattern on it. The snout is similar in colouration to the back but slightly lighter. The belly is cream to tan and is mottled.

The advertisement call of the frog consists of three notes.

== Distribution and habitat ==
E.amplinympha is endemic to the island of Dominica. It's a habitat generalist, but has a preference for and is primarily found in rainforests at elevations above 300 m (980 ft). Its range covers about 325 km^{2} (125 sq mi).

The preference for high elevation mostly separates it from Eleutherodactylus martinicensis, but some areas are inhabited by both species, and there they are sympatric.

== Conservation status ==
The species was listed as endangered in its 2020 assessment by the IUCN, primarily due to the fact that the species limited range makes it vulnerable to habitat loss.
