= Coulibistrie River =

River in Dominica

Coordinates: 15°27′N 61°28′W

The Coulibistrie River is a river on the Caribbean island of Dominica. It flows from the interior westward through a deep valley, and empties into the Caribbean Sea north of Batalie Bay. It is fast-flowing river, with small rapids and numerous bathing pools.

The village of Coulibistrie lines its banks near its outlet.

== See also ==
- List of rivers of Dominica
