= List of amphibians and reptiles of Martinique =

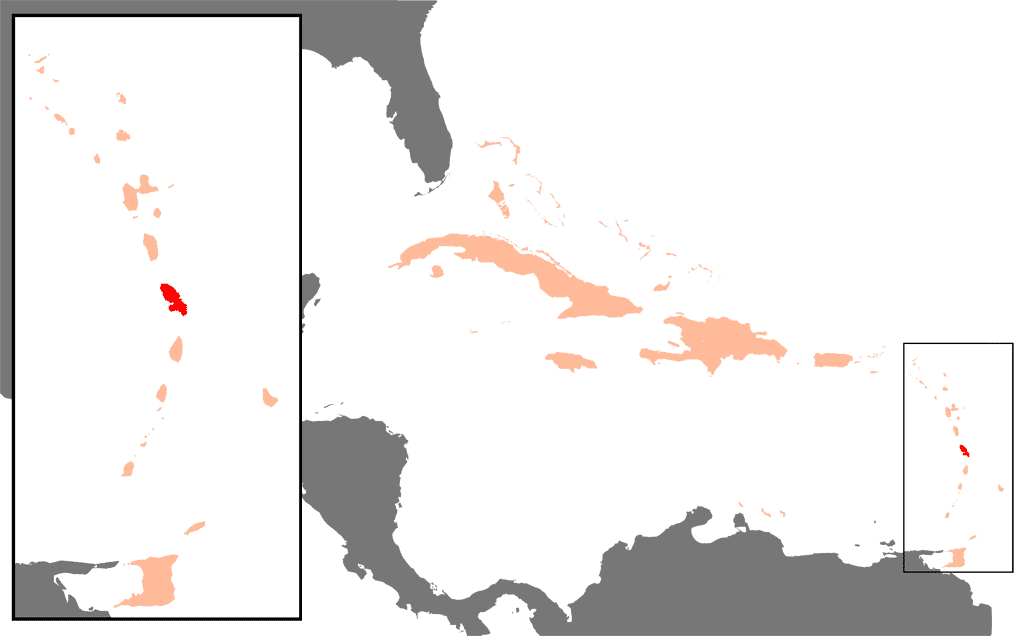
Location of Martinique in the Caribbean

The island of Martinique is an overseas department of France located in the Caribbean Lesser Antilles.

== Amphibians ==
There are five species of amphibian on Martinique, three of which were introduced. One species, the Martinique volcano frog (Colostethus chalcopis), is endemic to Martinique.

=== Frogs (Anura) ===
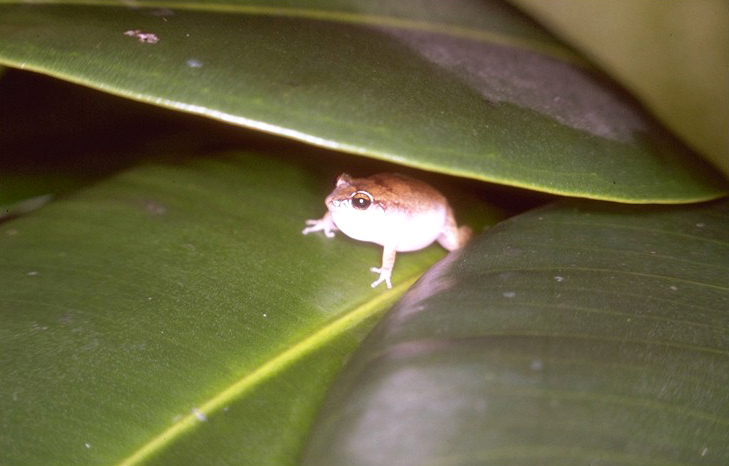
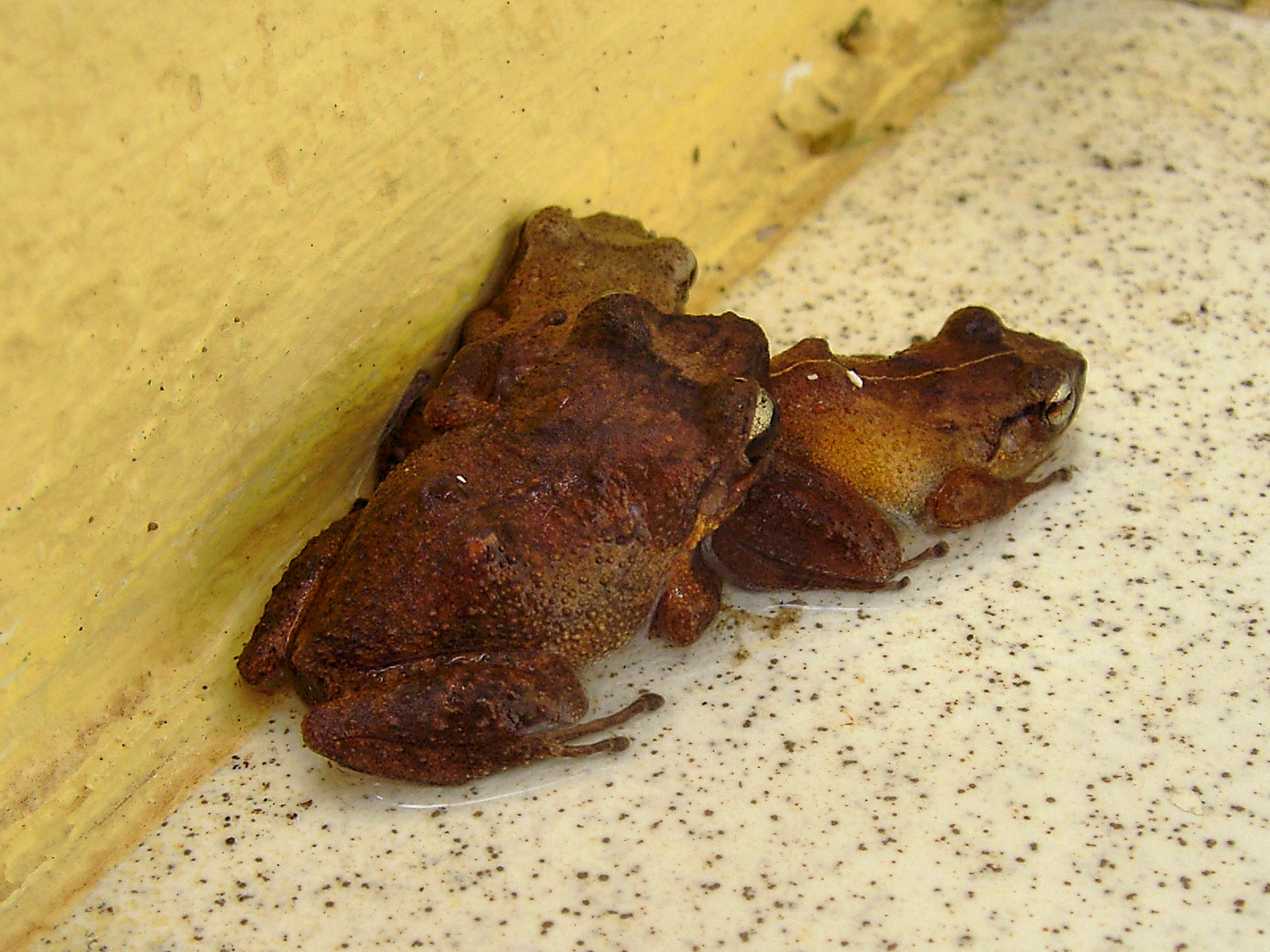
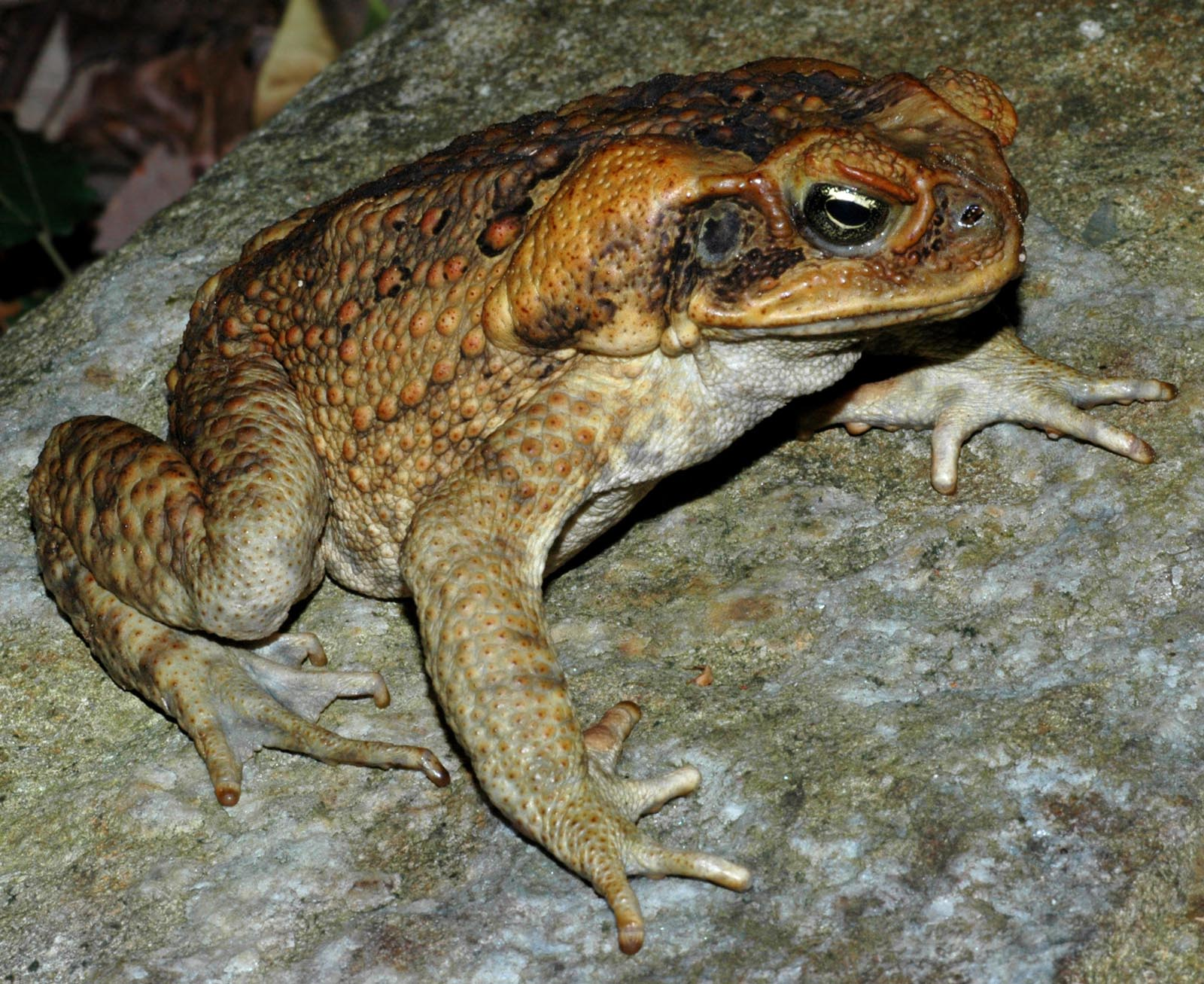
Poison dart frogs (Dendrobatidae)
Species	Common name(s)	Notes	Image
Colostethus chalcopis	Martinique volcano frog	Vulnerable. Endemic.
Tree frogs (Hylidae)
Species	Common name(s)	Notes	Image
Scinax ruber	Red-snouted tree frog	Least concern. Introduced; first recorded on Martinique in 1997.
Tropical frogs (Leptodactylidae)
Species	Common name(s)	Notes	Image
Eleutherodactylus johnstonei	Lesser Antillean whistling frog, coqui antillano, Johnstone's whistling frog	Least concern. Introduced.
Eleutherodactylus martinicensis	Tink frog, Martinique robber frog	Near threatened. Regional endemic.
True toads (Bufonidae)
Species	Common name(s)	Notes	Image
Bufo marinus	Cane toad, giant Neotropical toad, marine toad	Least concern. Introduced.

== Reptiles ==
Including marine turtles and introduced species, there are 19 reptile species reported on Martinique, five of which are endemic.

=== Crocodilians (Crocodylia) ===
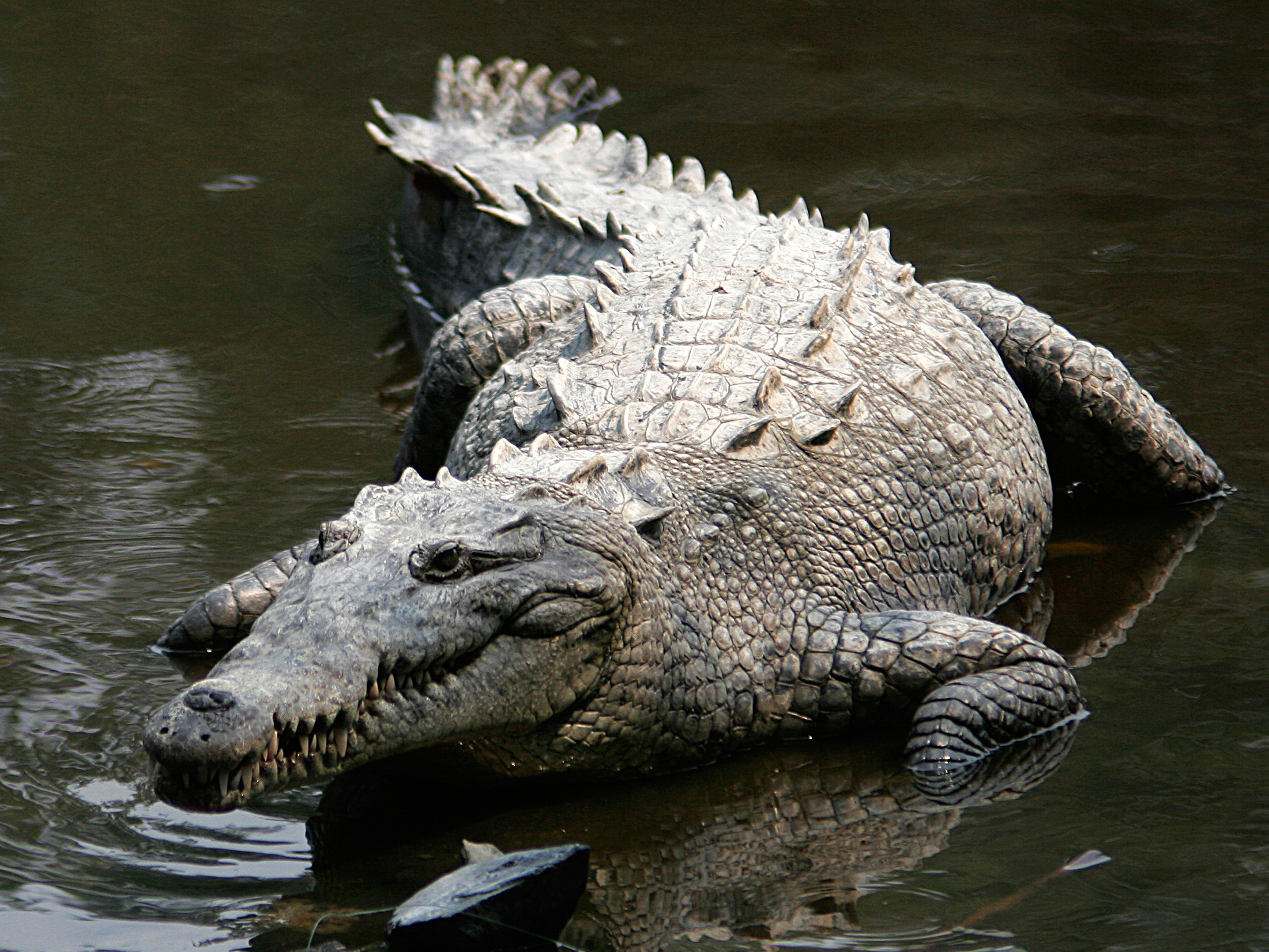
True crocodiles (Crocodylidae)
Species	Common name(s)	Notes	Image
Crocodylus acutus	American crocodile	Vulnerable

=== Turtles (Testudines) ===
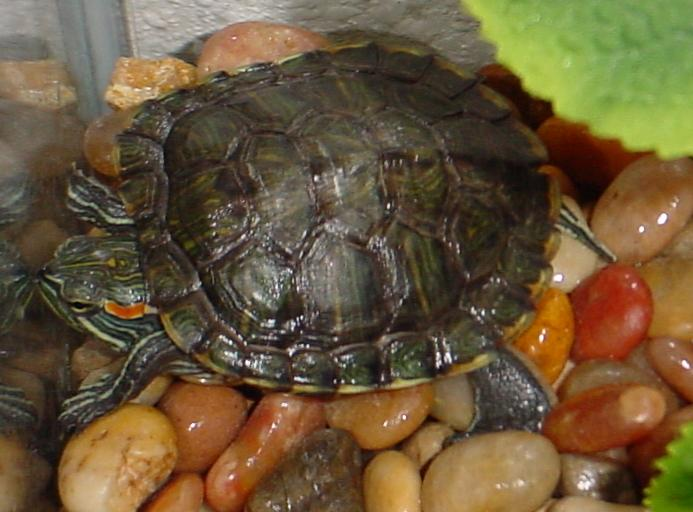
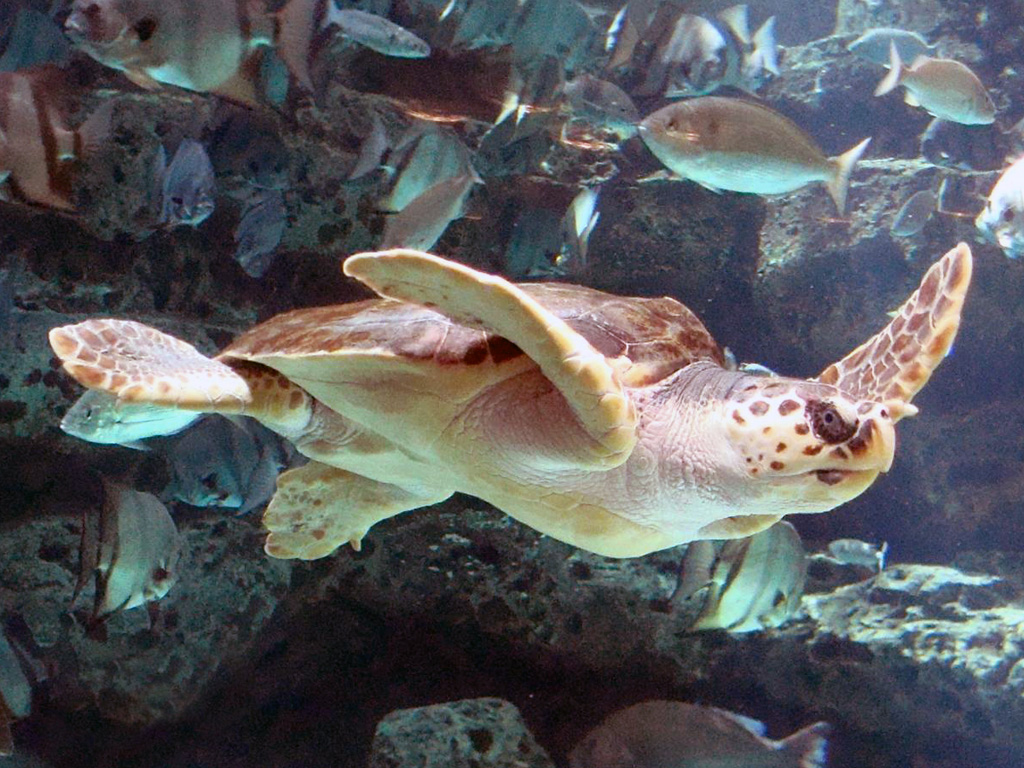
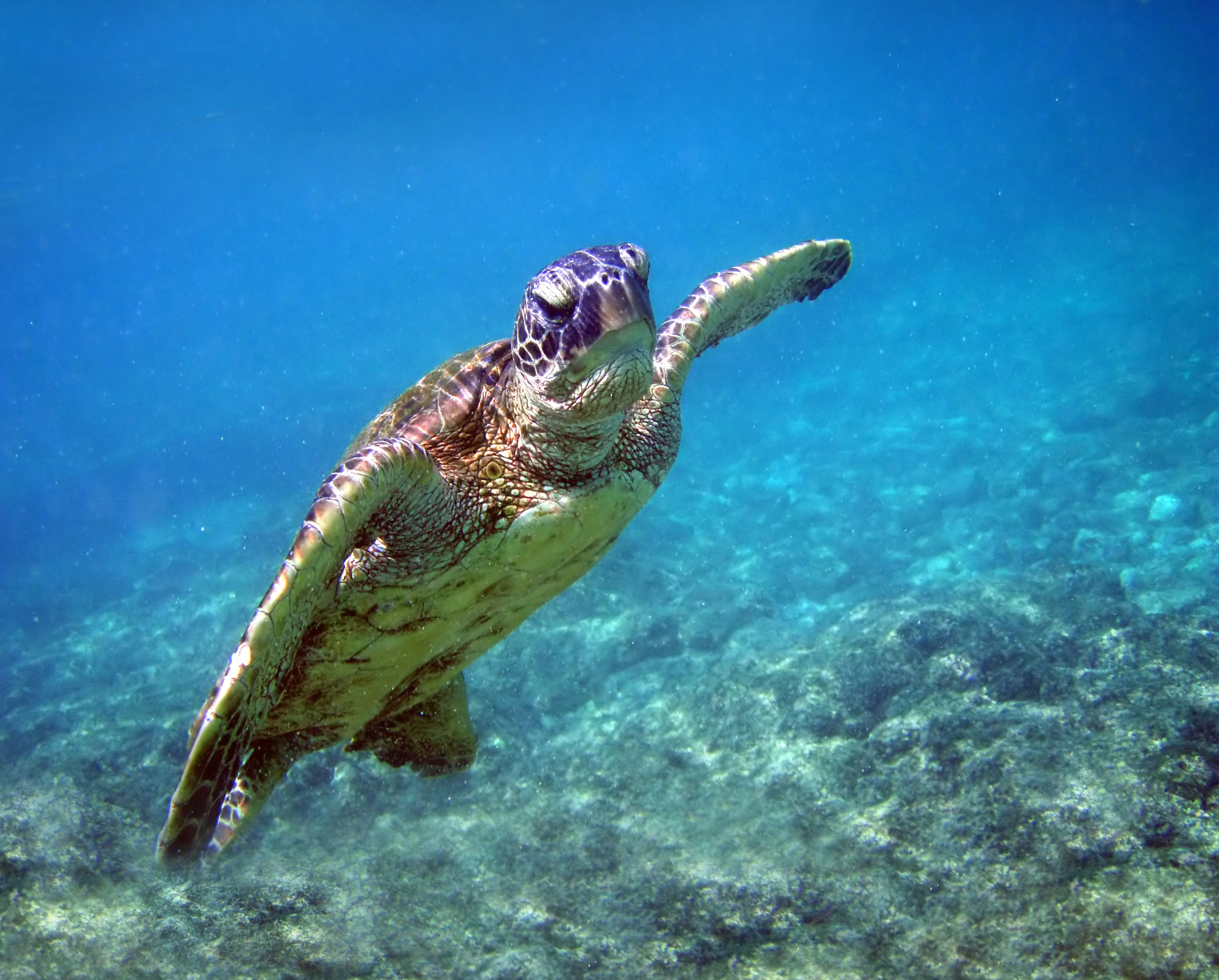
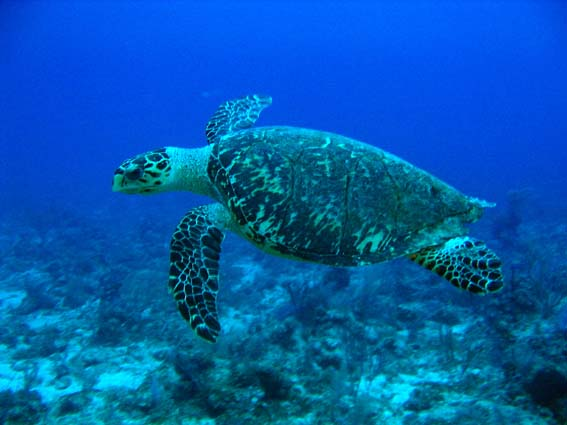
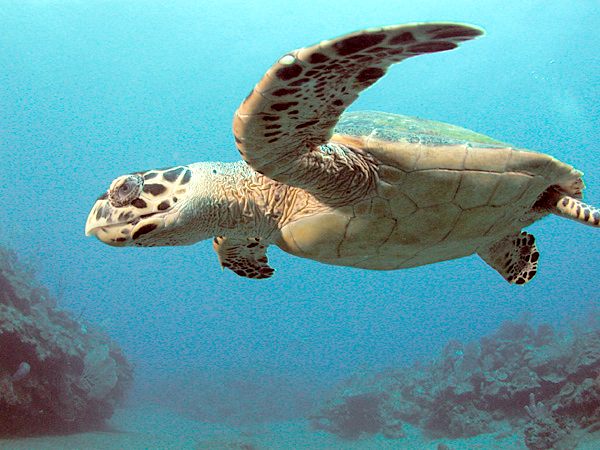
Box turtles and pond turtles (Emydidae)
Species	Common name(s)	Notes	Image
Trachemys scripta	Pond slider	Near threatened. Introduced.
Scaly sea turtles (Cheloniidae)
Species	Common name(s)	Notes	Image
Caretta caretta	Loggerhead turtle	Endangered.
Chelonia mydas	Green turtle	Endangered.
Eretmochelys imbricata	Hawksbill turtle	Critically endangered.
Leathery sea turtles (Dermochelyidae)
Species	Common name(s)	Notes	Image
Dermochelys coriacea	Leatherback turtle	Critically endangered.

=== Lizards and snakes (Squamata) ===
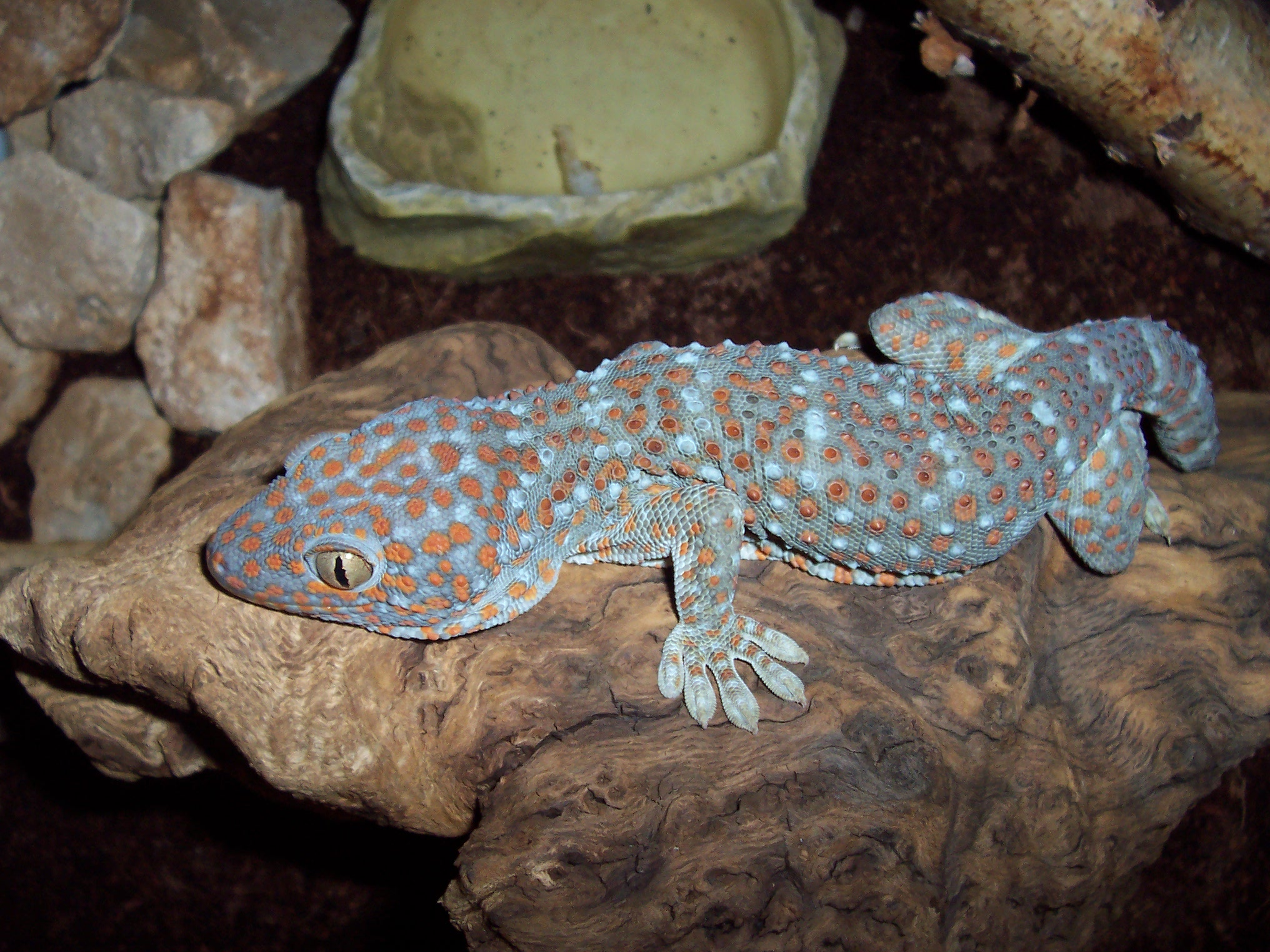
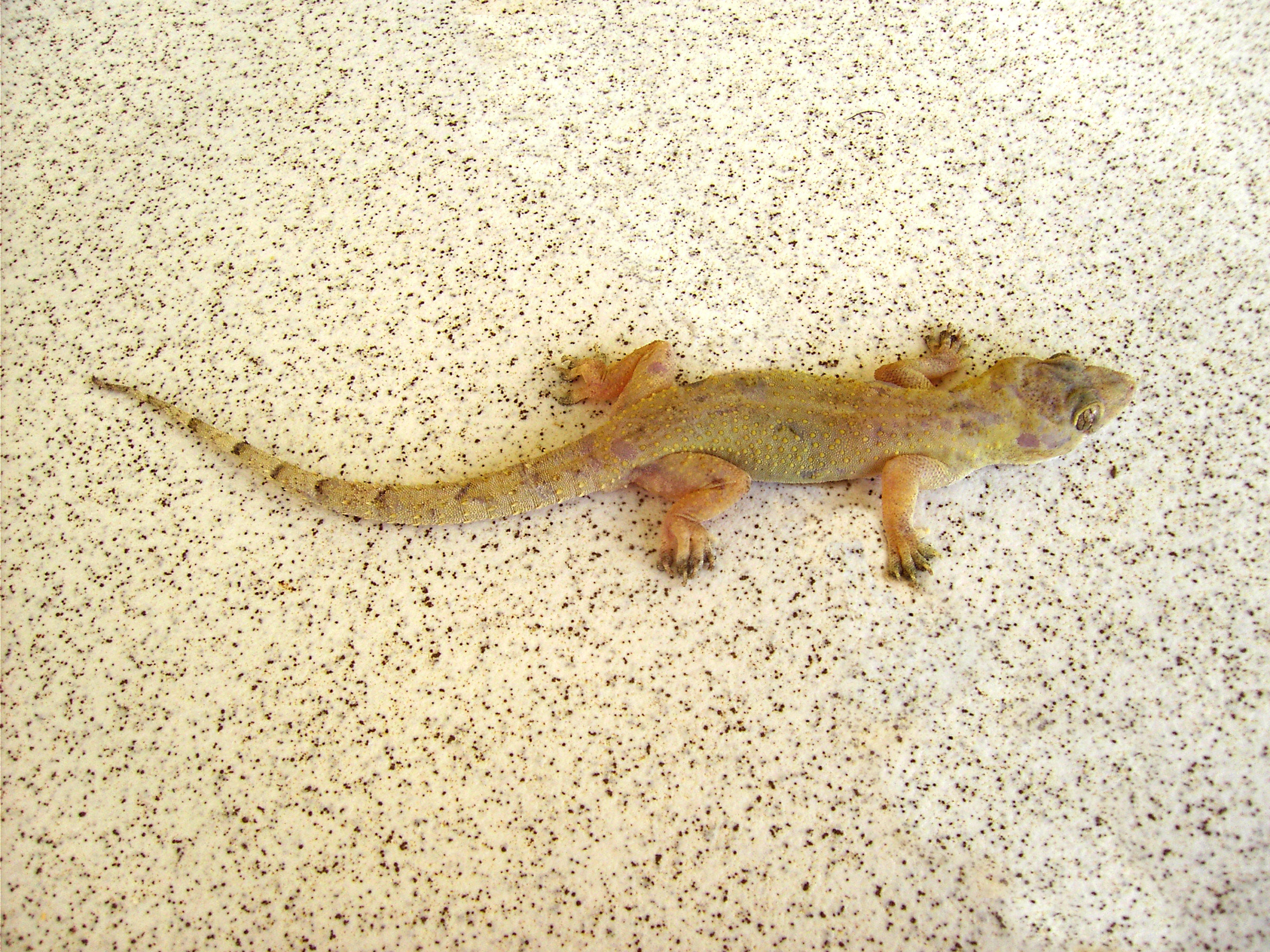
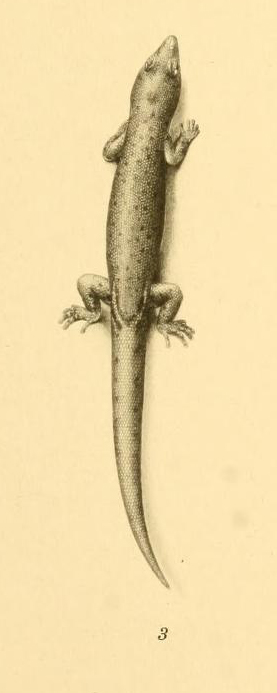
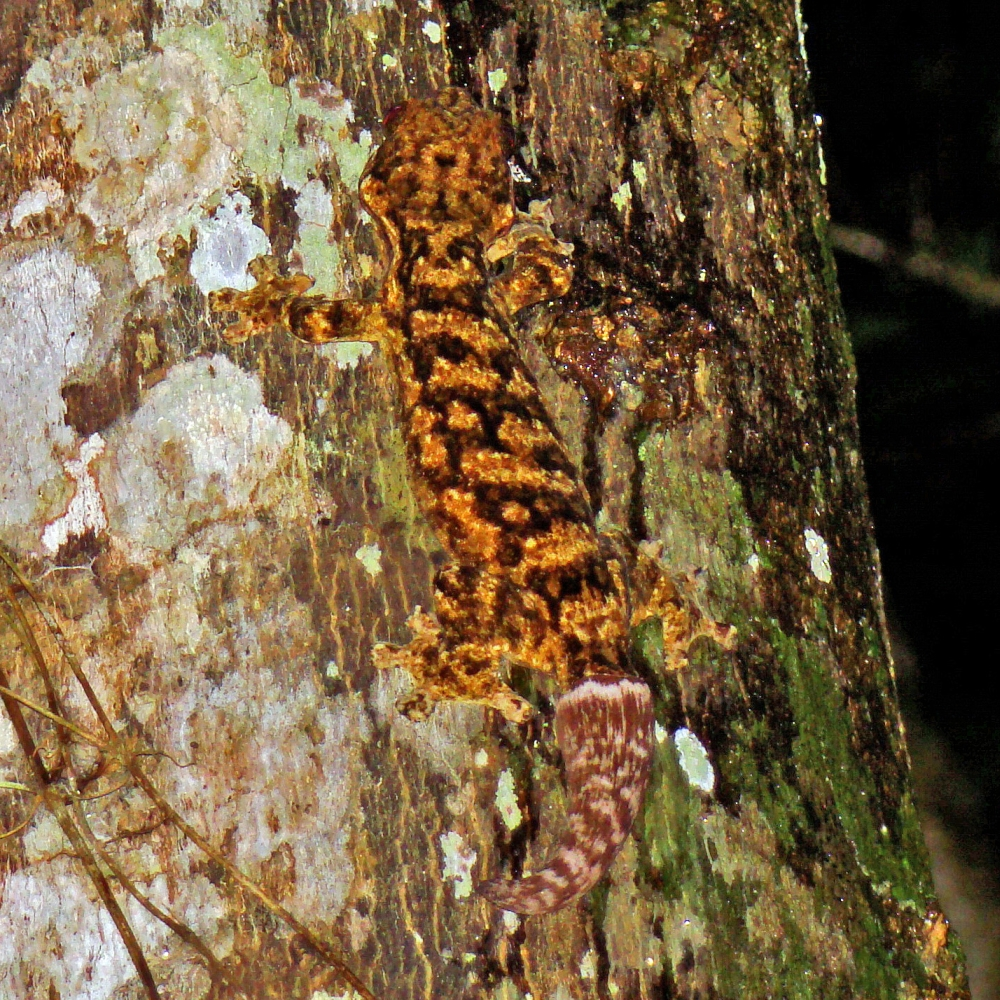
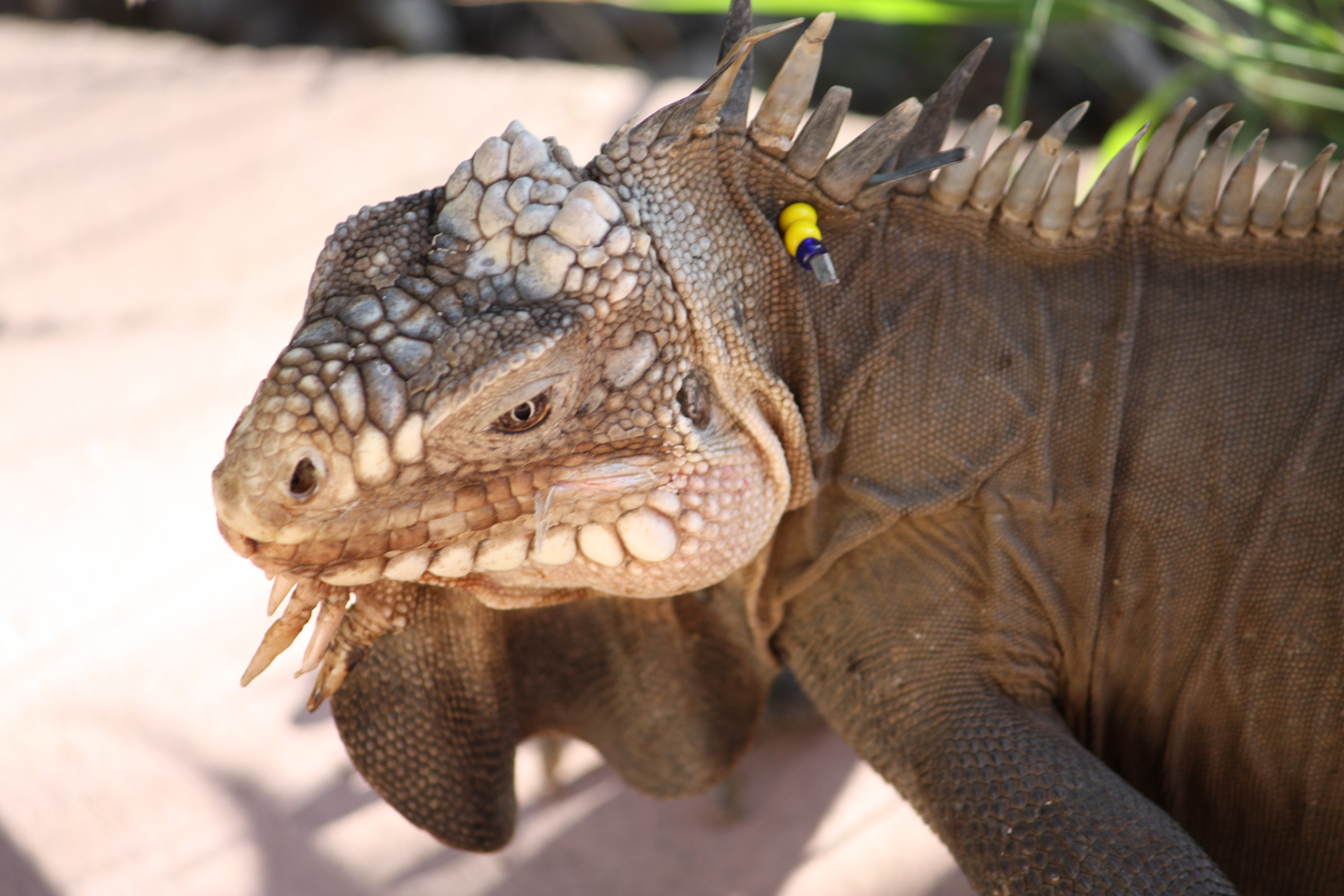
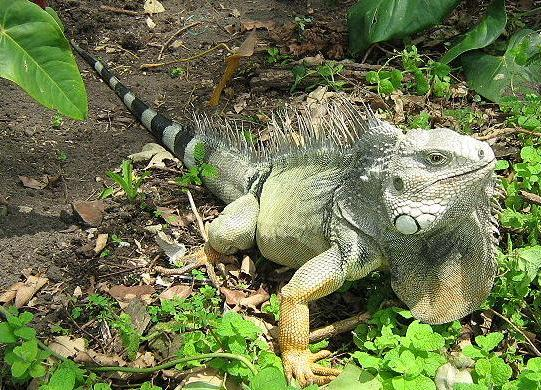
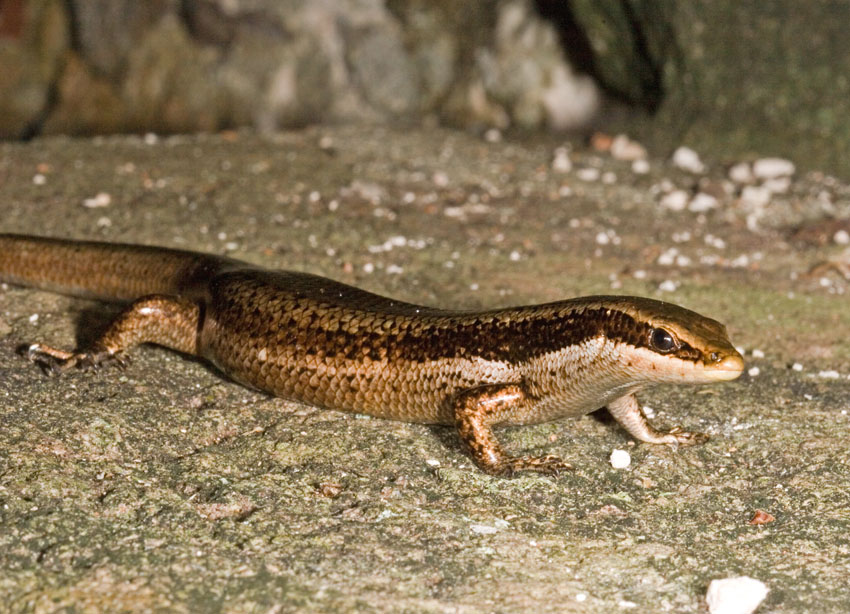
Geckos (Gekkonidae)
Species	Common name(s)	Notes	Image
Gecko gecko	Tokay gecko	Introduced.
Hemidactylus mabouia	House gecko	Introduced.
Sphaerodactylus vincenti	Vincent's least gecko	Regional endemic.
Thecadactylus rapicauda	Turnip-tailed gecko
Iguanas and Anolids (Iguanidae)
Species	Common name(s)	Notes	Image
Anolis roquet	Martinique's anole, savannah anole	Endemic.
Iguana delicatissima	Lesser Antillean iguana, West Indian iguana	Vulnerable. Regional endemic.
Iguana iguana	Green iguana, common iguana	Recently introduced.
Microteiids (Gymnophthalmidae)
Species	Common name(s)	Notes	Image
Gymnophthalmus pleii	Martinique spectacled tegu	Regional endemic.
Gymnophthalmus underwoodi	Underwood's spectacled tegu
Skinks (Scincidae)
Species	Common name(s)	Notes	Image
Mabuya mabouya		Regional endemic. Possibly extirpated.
Worm snakes (Typhlopidae)
Species	Common name(s)	Notes	Image
Leptotyphlops bilineata	Two-lined blind snake	Endemic. Possibly widespread. Populations on Barbados and St. Lucia were described as separate species in 2008, leaving L. bilineata only on Martinique.
Colubrids (Colubridae)
Species	Common name(s)	Notes	Image
Liophis cursor	Lacépède's ground snake	Endangered. Endemic. Extirpated from the main island; now remaining only on Diamond Rock.
Vipers (Viperidae)
Species	Common name(s)	Notes	Image
Bothrops lanceolatus	Fer-de-lance, Martinican pit viper, Martinique lancehead	Endemic. Widespread, though uncommon and confined to wetter regions.
