= Plea (disambiguation) =

A plea is an answer to a claim in a criminal court case.

Plea may also refer to:

- Plea (bug), a genus of bugs in the family Pleidae
- The Plea (film), a Soviet film
- The Plea (band), an Irish music band
- Alassane Pléa, French footballer

== See also ==
- Plead
- Plee
