= Scie =

Scie may refer to:

- La Scie, Newfoundland and Labrador, town in Canada
- Scie (river), a river in northern France
- Rivière à la Scie, a river in Quebec, Canada

== See also ==
- SCIE (disambiguation)
