= P word =

P word may refer to:

- Paki, a derogatory term for a person from South Asia (particularly Pakistan), mainly used in the UK
- Prostitute, considered an offensive term by most sex workers' rights activists
- Pussy, slang for female sex organ
- Please (disambiguation)
- Porn
- Penis
- Pansy
- Pedophile
- Puberty
- Piss (disambiguation), slang for urine
