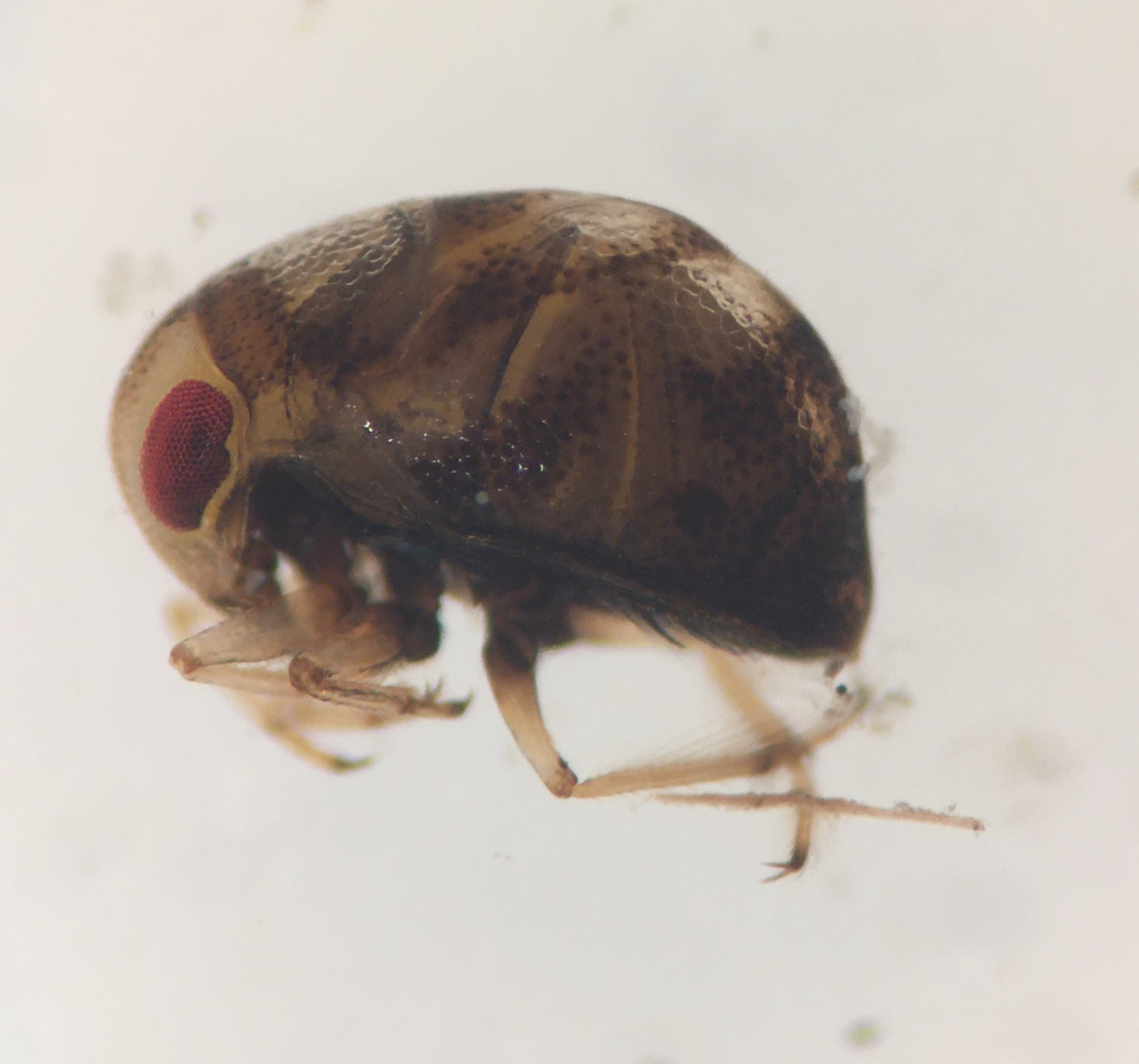

Scientific classification
- Kingdom: Animalia
- Phylum: Arthropoda
- Class: Insecta
- Order: Hemiptera
- Suborder: Heteroptera
- Family: Pleidae
- Genus: Neoplea
- Species: N. striola

Binomial name
- Neoplea striola (Fieber, 1844)

Synonyms
- Plea striola Fieber, 1844

= Neoplea striola =

Species of true bug

Neoplea striola is a species of pygmy backswimmer in the family Pleidae. It is found in North America.
