= Plée =

Plée is a French surname. Notable people with the surname include:

- Auguste Plée (1787–1825), French botanist
- Henry Plée (1923–2014), French martial artist

== See also ==
- La Grande Plée Bleue, a peat bog in Quebec, Canada
- Plea
