= Couture River =

River in Chaudière-Appalaches, Quebec (Canada)

- Native name: Rivière Couture (French)

Location
- Country: Canada
- Province: Quebec
- Region: Chaudière-Appalaches
- Lévis: City

Physical characteristics
- Source: La Grande Plée Bleue
  - location: Lévis
  - coordinates: 46.78444°N 71.04972°W
  - elevation: 89 metres (292 ft)
- Mouth: rivière à la Scie
  - location: Lévis
  - coordinates: 46.7675°N 71.1925°W
  - elevation: 49 metres (161 ft)
- Length: 7.0 km (4.3 mi)

Basin features
- Progression: St. Lawrence River

The rivière des Couture (in English: Couture River) is a tributary of the east bank of the rivière à la Scie which flows west to the south bank of the St. Lawrence River. This watercourse flows entirely within the territory of the city of Lévis, in the administrative region of Chaudière-Appalaches, in Québec, in Canada.

== Toponymy ==
The toponym “Rivière des Couture” was made official on March 28, 1974, at the Commission de toponymie du Québec.

== See also ==
- List of rivers of Quebec
