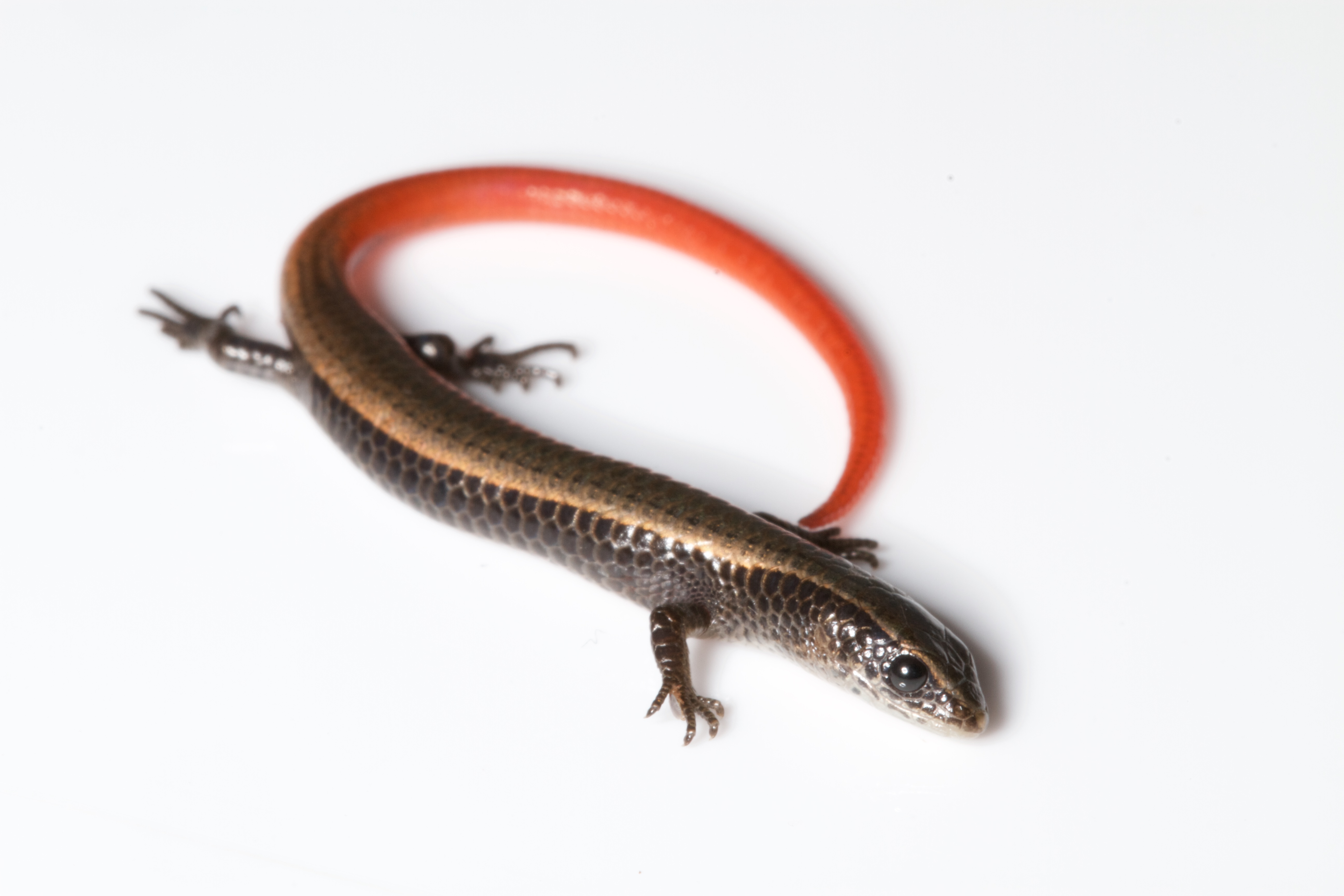

Conservation status
- Least Concern (IUCN 3.1)

Scientific classification
- Kingdom: Animalia
- Phylum: Chordata
- Class: Reptilia
- Order: Squamata
- Suborder: Lacertoidea
- Family: Gymnophthalmidae
- Genus: Gymnophthalmus
- Species: G. speciosus

Binomial name
- Gymnophthalmus speciosus (Hallowell, 1861)

= Gymnophthalmus speciosus =

Species of lizard

Gymnophthalmus speciosus, the golden spectacled tegu, is a microteiid lizard found in Mexico, Central America, and Colombia. It is a small, cylindrical lizard with a long tail and a tendency to reduced extremeties.
