= Gymnophthalmus leucomystax =

Scientific classification
- Domain: Eukaryota
- Kingdom: Animalia
- Phylum: Chordata
- Class: Reptilia
- Order: Squamata
- Family: Gymnophthalmidae
- Genus: Gymnophthalmus
- Species: G. leucomystax

Binomial name
- Gymnophthalmus leucomystax Vanzolini & Carvalho, 1991

Species of lizard

Gymnophthalmus leucomystax, the white spectacled tegu, is a species of lizard in the family Gymnophthalmidae. It is found in Brazil and Guyana.
