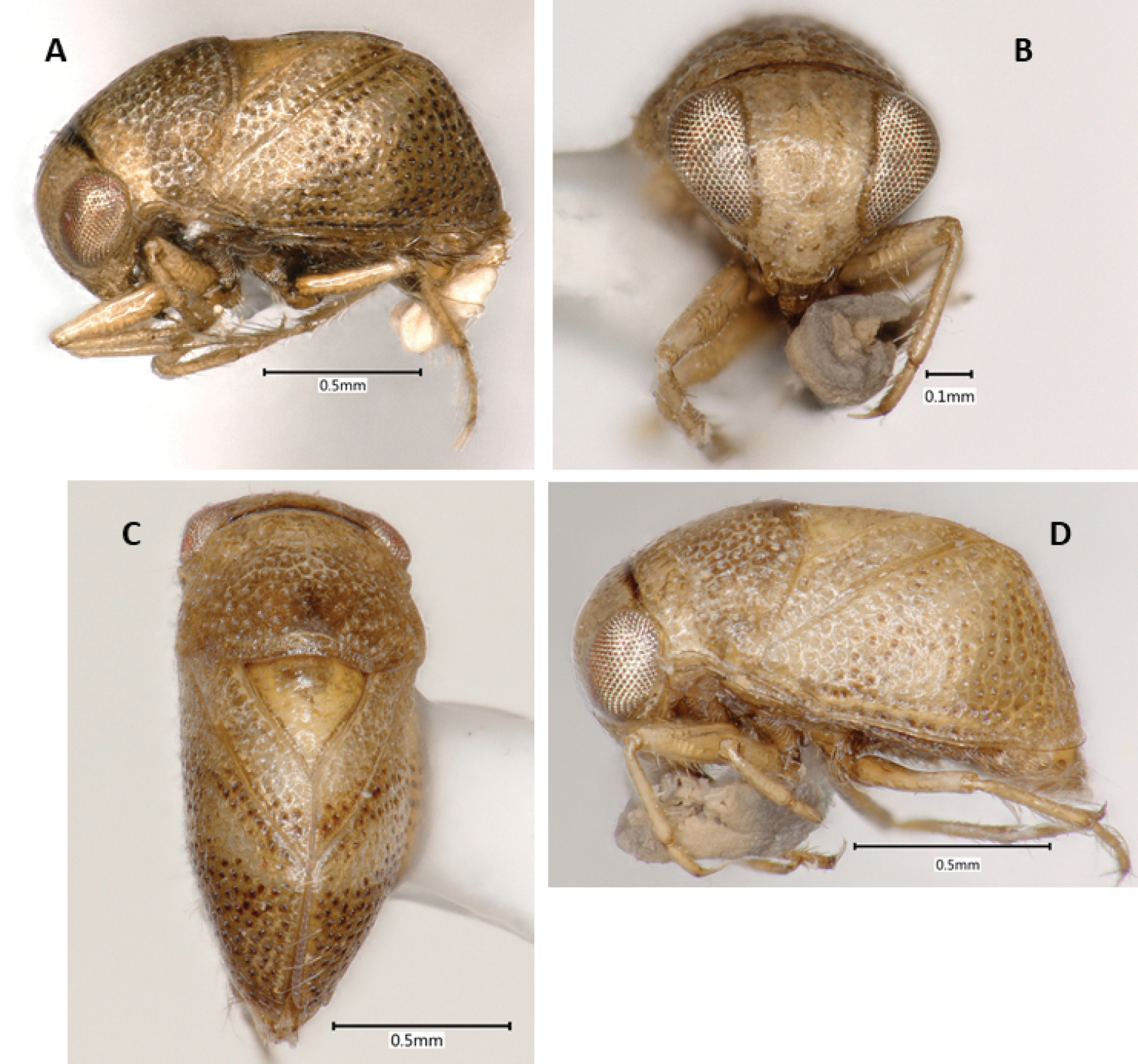
- Paraplea melanodera

Scientific classification
- Kingdom: Animalia
- Phylum: Arthropoda
- Class: Insecta
- Order: Hemiptera
- Suborder: Heteroptera
- Family: Pleidae
- Genus: Paraplea; Esaki & China, 1928

= Paraplea =

Genus of true bugs

Paraplea is a genus of pygmy backswimmers in the family Pleidae that occur in Africa, Australia, southern Asia, southern North America, and the Caribbean. There are 21 described species in Paraplea.

== Species ==
These 21 species belong to the genus Paraplea:

- Paraplea areolata (Paiva, 1918)
- Paraplea bifurcata Cook, 2021
- Paraplea brunni (Kirkaldy, 1898)
- Paraplea buenoi (Kirkaldy, 1904)
- Paraplea davaoensis Miyamoto, 1981
- Paraplea formosana (Esaki, 1915)
- Paraplea frontalis (Fieber, 1844)
- Paraplea halei (Lundblad, 1933)
- Paraplea indistinguenda (Matsumura, 1905)
- Paraplea japonica (Horváth, 1904)
- Paraplea lateromaculata Cook, 2020
- Paraplea liturata (Fieber, 1844)
- Paraplea melanodera Cook, 2020
- Paraplea nilionis (Drake & Chapman, 1953)
- Paraplea pallescens (Distant, 1906)
- Paraplea piccanina (Hutchinson, 1929)
- Paraplea puella (Barber, 1923)
- Paraplea pullula (Stål, 1855)
- Paraplea simplex Cook, 2025
- Paraplea sobrina (Stål, 1860)
- Paraplea vittifrons (Horváth, 1919)
