= Gymnophthalmus marconaterai =

Scientific classification
- Kingdom: Animalia
- Phylum: Chordata
- Class: Reptilia
- Order: Squamata
- Family: Gymnophthalmidae
- Genus: Gymnophthalmus
- Species: G. marconaterai

Binomial name
- Gymnophthalmus marconaterai García-Pérez & Schargel, 2017

Species of lizard

Gymnophthalmus marconaterai is a species of lizard in the family Gymnophthalmidae. It is endemic to Venezuela.
