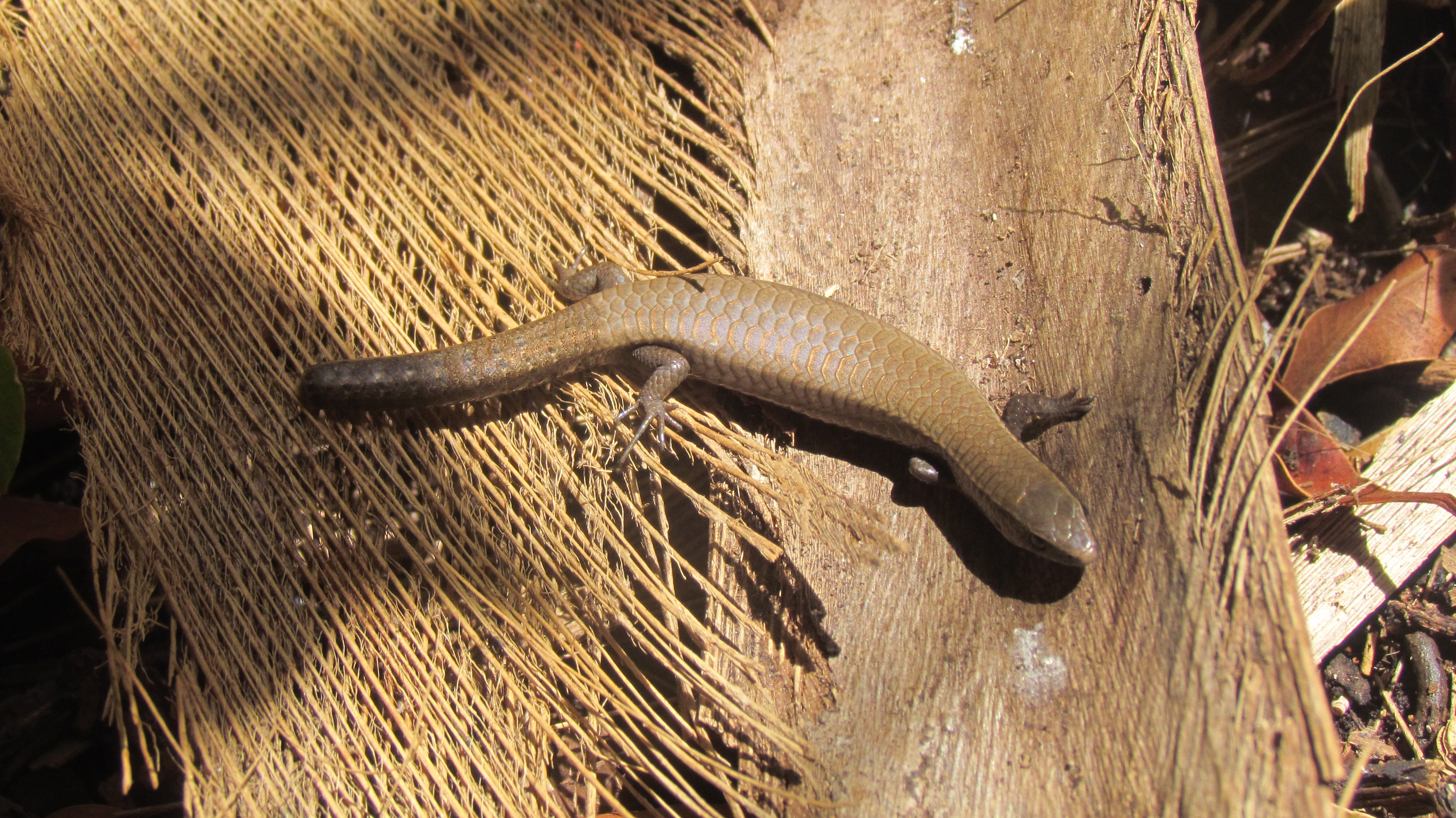
- Underwood's spectacled tegu

Conservation status
- Least Concern (IUCN 3.1)

Scientific classification
- Kingdom: Animalia
- Phylum: Chordata
- Class: Reptilia
- Order: Squamata
- Family: Gymnophthalmidae
- Genus: Gymnophthalmus
- Species: G. underwoodi

Binomial name
- Gymnophthalmus underwoodi Grant, 1958

= Gymnophthalmus underwoodi =

Species of lizard

Gymnophthalmus underwoodi, known commonly as Underwood's spectacled tegu, is a species of microteiid lizard. It is found in South America and in the Caribbean.

== Etymology ==
The first description of Gymnophthalmus underwoodi was published by Chapman Grant in 1958. The holotype was collected by Grant in January 1957, with the type locality being Barbados. The specific name, underwoodi is named after British herpetologist Garth Underwood "in recognition of his work on West Indian herpetiles."* Underwood had collected a series of 13 specimens from Barbados in 1958, classified by the Museum of Comparative Zoology that was housing them as Gymnophthalmus lineatus, which Grant used to investigate the possibility that the specimen he had collected in 1957 was a member of an undescribed species; Underwood's specimens ended up being designated as paratypes by Grant.

== Description ==
G. underwoodi is a unisexual species, reproducing through parthenogenesis. Captive specimens have been recorded laying up to eleven eggs within four months, with between one and four eggs per clutch.

== Distribution and habitat ==
In the Caribbean, G. underwoodi is known to be found in the Dominican Republic, Dominica, Antigua and Barbuda, Barbados, Cuba, Guadeloupe, Martinique, Saint Martin (both the Dutch part and the French part), Trinidad and Tobago, the US Virgin Islands (on Saint Thomas), Saint Vincent and the Grenadines, Grenada, Sint Eustatius and Saba. In South America, G.underwoodi is known to be found in Guyana, Suriname, Colombia, and Venezuela, and potentially also in Brazil and French Guiana.

The natural habitat of G. underwoodi is grassland.
