= Heteroplea =

Scientific classification
- Kingdom: Animalia
- Phylum: Arthropoda
- Class: Insecta
- Order: Hemiptera
- Suborder: Heteroptera
- Family: Pleidae
- Genus: Heteroplea; Cook, 2011

Genus of true bugs

Heteroplea is a genus of pygmy backswimmers in the family Pleidae that occur in South America. There are four described species in Heteroplea.

== Species ==
These four species belong to the genus Heteroplea:

- Heteroplea acanthoscelis Cook, 2017
- Heteroplea asperscyta Cook, 2020
- Heteroplea ornata Cook, 2020
- Heteroplea stictosoma Cook, 2011
