= Please (disambiguation) =

Please is a usually polite expression of request.

Please may also refer to:

== Music ==
=== Albums ===
- Please (Pet Shop Boys album) (1986)
- Please (Matt Nathanson album) (1993)
- Please (Sondre Lerche album) (2014)

=== Songs ===
- "Please" (Toni Braxton song) (2005)
- "Please" (Robin Gibb song) (2003)
- "Please (You Got That ...)", a 1993 song by INXS
- "Please" (The Kinleys song) (1997)
- "Please" (Shizuka Kudo song) (1991)
- "Please" (Pam Tillis song) (2000)
- "Please" (U2 song) (1997)
- "Please", a 1998 song by The Apples in Stereo from Velocity of Sound
- "Please", a 1970 song by John Cale from Vintage Violence
- "Please", a 1932 song by Bing Crosby
- "Please", a 2015 song by Sawyer Fredericks
- "Please", a 2007 song by Paul Hartnoll from The Ideal Condition
- "Please", a 2002 song by Chris Isaak from Speak of the Devil
- "Please", a 2003 song by Lamb from Between Darkness and Wonder
- "Please", a 2021 song by Lil Baby and Lil Durk from The Voice of the Heroes
- "Please", a 2003 song by Maxeen from Maxeen
- "Please", a 2010 song by Tom McRae from The Alphabet of Hurricanes
- "Please", a 1999 song by Nine Inch Nails from The Fragile
- "Please", a 2005 song by Staind from Chapter V
- "Please", a 2001 song by Pam Tillis from Thunder & Roses
- "Please", a 1989 song from the musical Miss Saigon
- "P.L.E.A.S.E", a 2024 song by Noga Erez from The Vandalist

== Other uses ==
- Please (film), a 1933 short musical comedy film
- "Please" (Daredevil)
- PLEASE, a keyword in the INTERCAL programming language

== See also ==
- Gratification
- "Please, Please", a song by McFly
- Please Please Please (disambiguation)
- Plea (disambiguation)
- Pleasure
