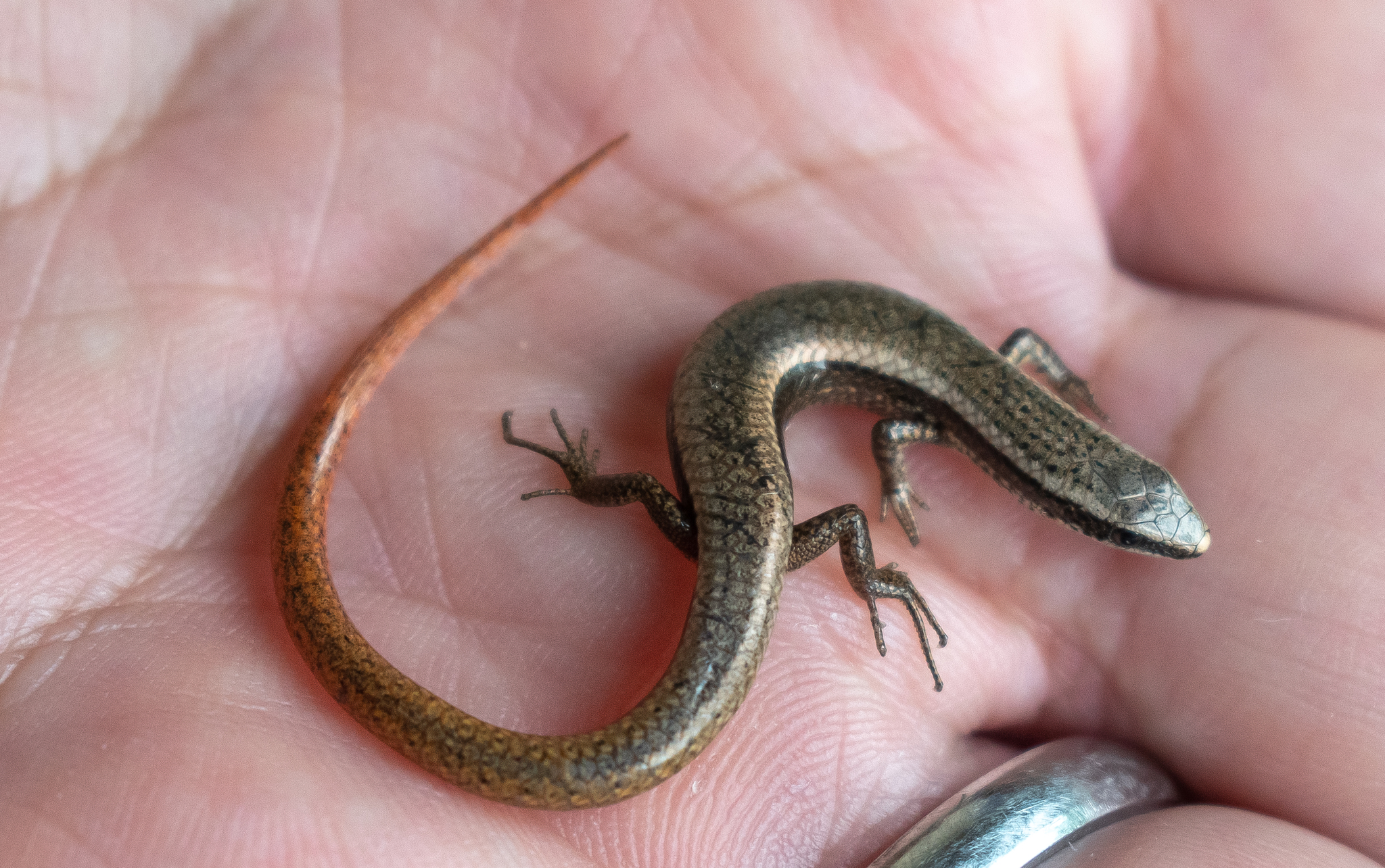

Conservation status
- Least Concern (IUCN 3.1)

Scientific classification
- Kingdom: Animalia
- Phylum: Chordata
- Class: Reptilia
- Order: Squamata
- Family: Gymnophthalmidae
- Genus: Gymnophthalmus
- Species: G. vanzoi

Binomial name
- Gymnophthalmus vanzoi C. Carvalho, 1999

= Gymnophthalmus vanzoi =

Species of lizard

Gymnophthalmus vanzoi is a species of lizard in the family Gymnophthalmidae. The species is endemic to South America.

== Etymology ==
The specific name, vanzoi, is in honor of Brazilian herpetologist Paulo Vanzolini.

== Geographic range ==
G. vanzoi is found in northern Brazil (in the Brazilian states of Pará and Roraima) and in Guyana.

== Habitat ==
The preferred natural habitat of G. vanzoi is forest.

== Reproduction ==
G. vanzoi is oviparous.
