= SCIE =

SCIE or scie may refer to:

- Shenzhen College of International Education
- Social Care Institute for Excellence
- Science Citation Index Expanded

== See also ==
- Scie (disambiguation)
