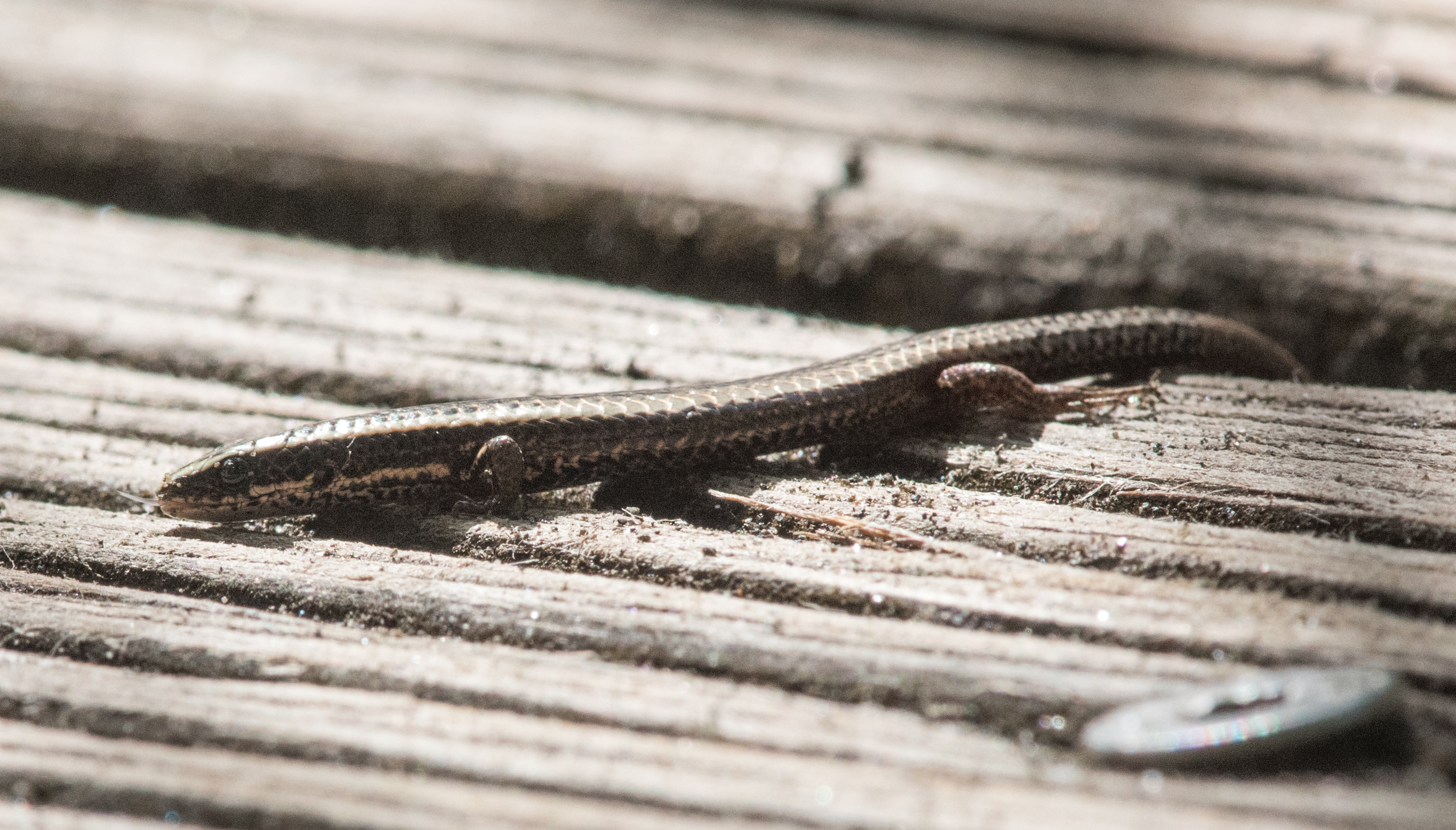
- Gymnophthalmus pleii

Scientific classification
- Kingdom: Animalia
- Phylum: Chordata
- Class: Reptilia
- Order: Squamata
- Family: Gymnophthalmidae
- Tribe: Gymnophthalmini
- Genus: Gymnophthalmus; Merrem, 1820

Species
- Eight, see text.

= Gymnophthalmus =

Genus of lizards

Gymnophthalmus is genus of lizards in the family Gymnophthalmidae. The genus is native to Mexico, Central America, and the northern part of South America. Eight species are recognized as being valid.

== Species ==
The genus Gymnophthalmus contains the following species.

- Gymnophthalmus cryptus Hoogmoed, Cole & Ayarzagüena, 1992 – cryptic spectacled tegu
- Gymnophthalmus leucomystax Vanzolini & Carvalho, 1991 – white spectacled tegu
- Gymnophthalmus lineatus (Linnaeus, 1758)
- Gymnophthalmus marconaterai García-Pérez & Schargel, 2017
- Gymnophthalmus pleii Bocourt, 1881 – Martinique spectacled tegu, rough-scaled worm lizard
- Gymnophthalmus speciosus (Hallowell, 1861) – golden spectacled tegu
- Gymnophthalmus underwoodi Grant, 1958 – Underwood's spectacled tegu
- Gymnophthalmus vanzoi Carvalho, 1999
