= Neoplea =

Scientific classification
- Kingdom: Animalia
- Phylum: Arthropoda
- Clade: Pancrustacea
- Class: Insecta
- Order: Hemiptera
- Suborder: Heteroptera
- Family: Pleidae
- Genus: Neoplea; Esaki & China, 1928

Genus of true bugs

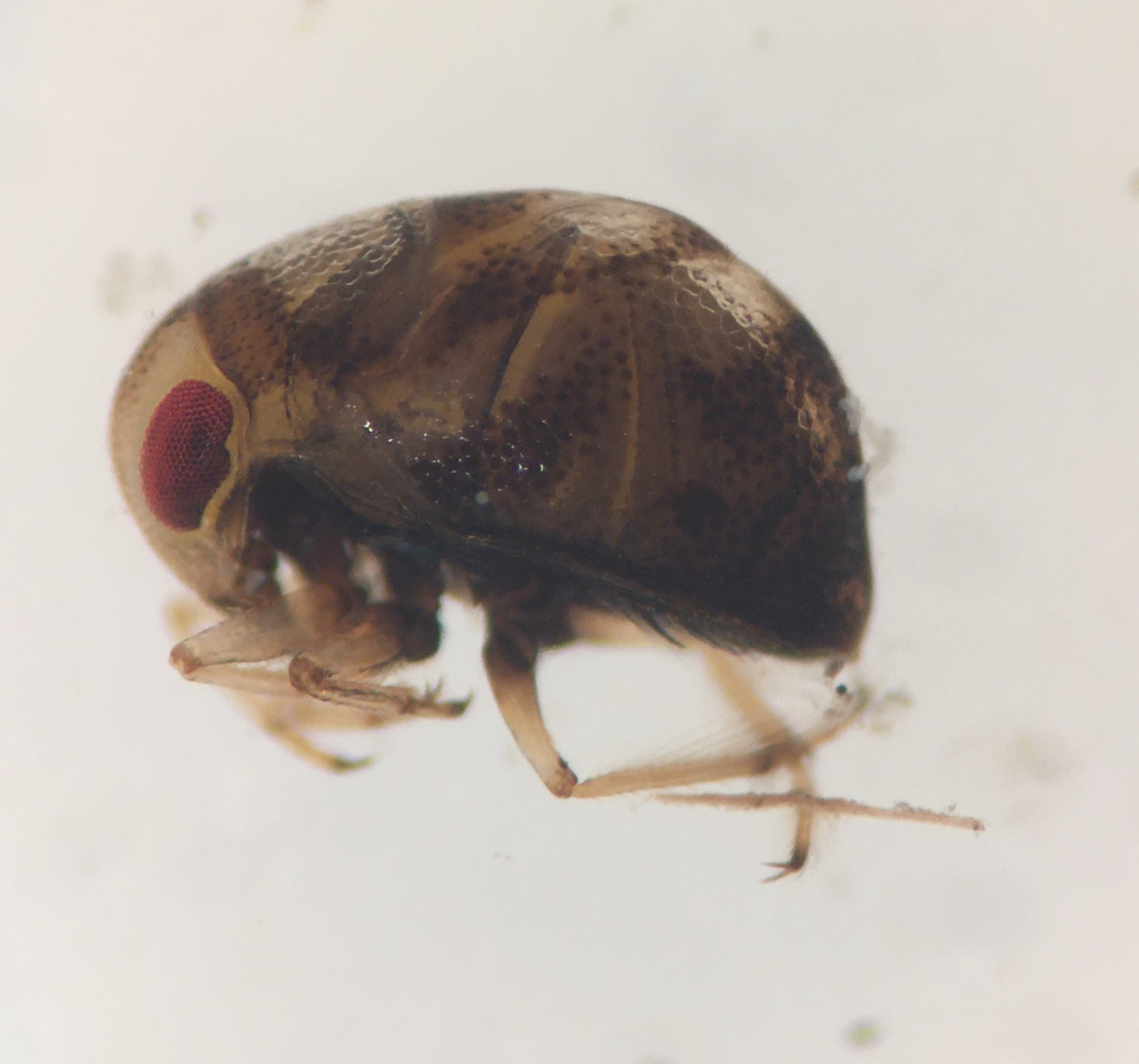
Neoplea striola

Neoplea is a genus of pygmy backswimmers in the family Pleidae that occur in North and South America. There are at least 25 described species in Neoplea, with numerous undescribed species.

== Species ==
These species belong to the genus Neoplea:

- Neoplea absona (Drake & Chapman, 1953)
- Neoplea aenea Cook, 2026
- Neoplea argentina (Drake & Chapman, 1953)
- Neoplea apopkana (Drake & Chapman, 1953)
- Neoplea borellii (Kirkaldy, 1899)
- Neoplea breviscutellum Cook, 2026
- Neoplea centocorpus Cook, 2026
- Neoplea chichimeca Cook, 2026
- Neoplea gauchita Bachmann, 1968
- Neoplea globoidea Nieser, 1975
- Neoplea harnedi (Drake, 1922)
- Neoplea hyaloderma Cook, Mondragón-F., & Morales, 2020
- Neoplea lingula Roback & Nieser, 1974
- Neoplea maculosa (Berg, 1879)
- Neoplea maurochilus Cook, 2026
- Neoplea melanosoma Cook, Mondragón-F., & Morales, 2020
- Neoplea mexicana (Drake & Chapman, 1953)
- Neoplea micropunctata Cook, 2026
- Neoplea notana (Drake & Chapman, 1953)
- Neoplea polhemusi Cook, 2026
- Neoplea punctifer (Barber, 1923)
- Neoplea semipicta (Horváth, 1918)
- Neoplea striola (Fieber, 1844)
- Neoplea tenuistyla Roback, & Nieser, 1974
- Neoplea umbraticus Cook, 2026
