= Gymnophthalmus cryptus =

Conservation status
- Least Concern (IUCN 3.1)

Scientific classification
- Kingdom: Animalia
- Phylum: Chordata
- Class: Reptilia
- Order: Squamata
- Family: Gymnophthalmidae
- Genus: Gymnophthalmus
- Species: G. cryptus

Binomial name
- Gymnophthalmus cryptus Hoogmoed, Cole, & Ayarzagüena, 1992

Species of lizard

Gymnophthalmus cryptus, the cryptic spectacled tegu, is a species of lizard in the family Gymnophthalmidae. It is endemic to Venezuela.
