= Please Please Please =

Please Please Please may refer to:

- Please Please Please (album), a 1958 album by James Brown
  - "Please, Please, Please" (James Brown song)
- "Please Please Please" (Sabrina Carpenter song)
- "Please Please Please", a song by Fiona Apple from Extraordinary Machine

== See also ==
- "Please, Please", a song by McFly
- Please (disambiguation)
