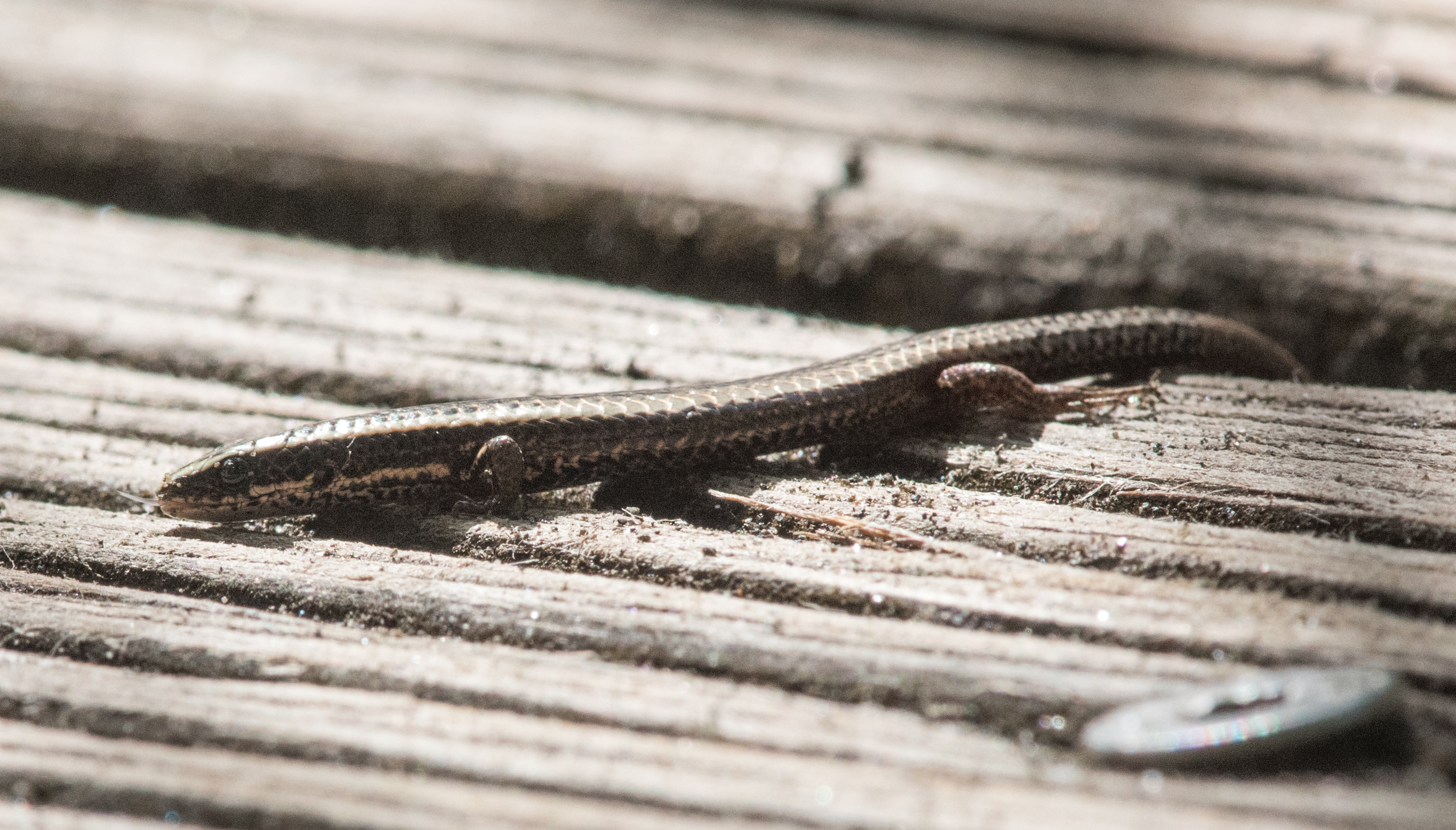
- in Martinique

Conservation status
- Near Threatened (IUCN 3.1)

Scientific classification
- Kingdom: Animalia
- Phylum: Chordata
- Class: Reptilia
- Order: Squamata
- Family: Gymnophthalmidae
- Genus: Gymnophthalmus
- Species: G. pleii

Binomial name
- Gymnophthalmus pleii Bocourt, 1881

Subspecies
- G. p. pleii Bocourt, 1881; G. p. luetkeni Bocourt, 1881; G. p. nesydrion Thomas, 1965

Synonyms
- Gymnophthalmus pleei [sic]

= Martinique spectacled tegu =

Gymnophthalmus pleii

Species of lizard

Gymnophthalmus pleii, known commonly as the Martinique spectacled tegu and the rough-scaled worm lizard, is a species of lizard in the family Gymnophthalmidae, a family known commonly as "microteiids". The species is found in the Caribbean, on the Lesser Antilles islands of Guadeloupe, Dominica, Martinique, Saint Lucia, and Maria I.

== Taxonomy and geographic range ==
The nominate subspecies, G. p. pleii, is endemic to Martinique, and G. p. luetkeni and G. p. nesydrion are restricted to Saint Lucia. The populations on Guadeloupe and Dominica have not yet been assigned to subspecies.

== Etymology ==
The specific name pleii, is in honor of French botanist Auguste Plée.
