= Rivière à la Scie =

River in Chaudière-Appalaches, Quebec, Canada

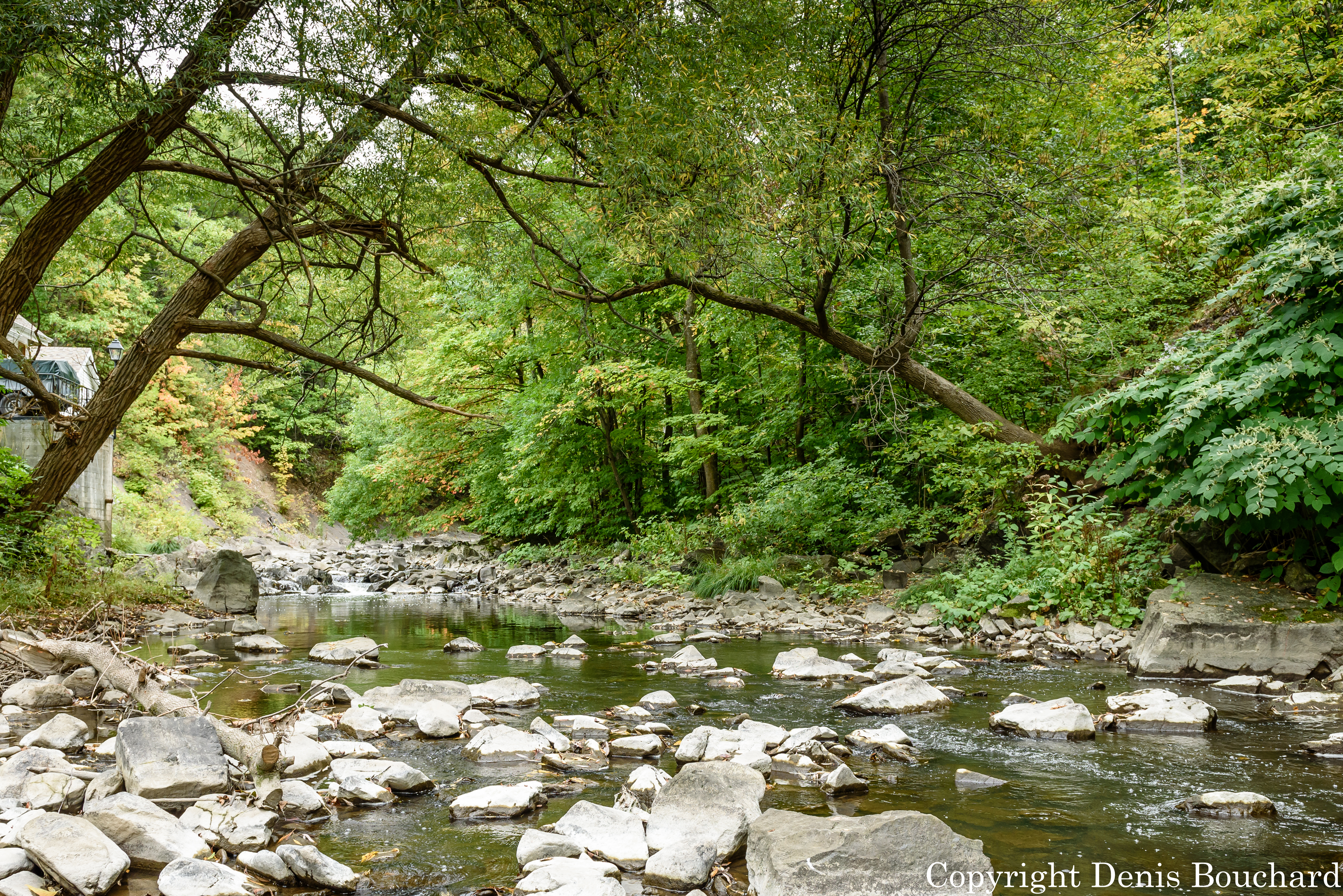

- Location within Quebec

Location
- Country: Canada
- Province: Quebec
- Region: Chaudière-Appalaches
- City: Lévis

Physical characteristics
- Source: Agricultural streams
  - location: Lévis
  - coordinates: 46.7585642°N 71.0660559°W
  - elevation: 82 metres (269 ft)
- Mouth: St. Lawrence River
  - location: Lévis
  - coordinates: 46.7675°N 71.21806°W
  - elevation: 4 metres (13 ft)
- Length: 15.2 kilometres (9.4 mi)

Basin features
- Progression: St. Lawrence River

The rivière à la Scie is a tributary of the south shore of the St. Lawrence River. This watercourse empties into the city of Lévis and flows entirely within the territory of the city of Lévis, in the administrative region of Chaudière-Appalaches, in Quebec, in Canada.

== Geography ==
The main neighboring watersheds of the Scie river are:

- North side: St. Lawrence River;
- East side: Ruisseau Rouge, Couture River;
- South side: Etchemin River;
- West side: Etchemin River.

The Scie river has its source at the Monseigneur Bourget road, north of the plée de Beauharnois and south of the Grande Plé Bleu zone which straddles the Pintendre and Saint-Joseph-de-la-Pointe-de-Lévy sectors, in the city of Lévis. This spring surrounded by wetlands is located near a fish farm at:

- 4.3 kilometres (2.7 mi) east of the center of the village of Pintendre;
- 6.8 kilometres (4.2 mi) north of the center of the village of Saint-Henri.

The Scie river flows in agricultural or urban areas, more or less parallel (east side) to the Etchemin river. From its source, the Scie River flows over 15.2 kilometres (9.4 mi) in the following segments:

- 3.8 kilometres (2.4 mi) westward, to route 173 which crosses the village of Pintendre;
- 6.5 kilometres (4.0 mi) north-west, winding up to autoroute 20, which it crosses east of exit 321;
- 1.7 kilometres (1.1 mi) towards the north-west, winding up to the confluence of the Couture River (coming from the east);
- 3.2 kilometres (2.0 mi) westward, up to its confluence.

The confluence of Rivière à la Scie is located on the south shore of the Estuary of Saint Lawrence, in the Saint-Télesphore sector. This confluence is located at 0.9 kilometres (0.56 mi) east of the confluence of the Etchemin River, at 3.9 kilometres (2.4 mi) east of the confluence of the Chaudière River and 5.3 kilometres (3.3 mi) west of the Lévis-Québec ferry.

== Toponymy ==
The wood used to build the Ursuline Convent in Quebec was taken from the banks of the Rivière à la Scie. A sawmill was built in this area in 1706 by Georges Regnard Duplessis, the sixth lord of Lauzon. It is not unreasonable to believe that the name of the river evokes this sawmill. In 1776, Henry Caldwell, then tenant of the seigneury, undertook in his turn, in the same place, the construction of a flour mill which included stores, as well as a warehouse of flour and housing for the workers.

The toponym Rivière à la Scie was made official on December 5, 1968, at the Commission de toponymie du Québec.

== See also ==
- List of rivers of Quebec
