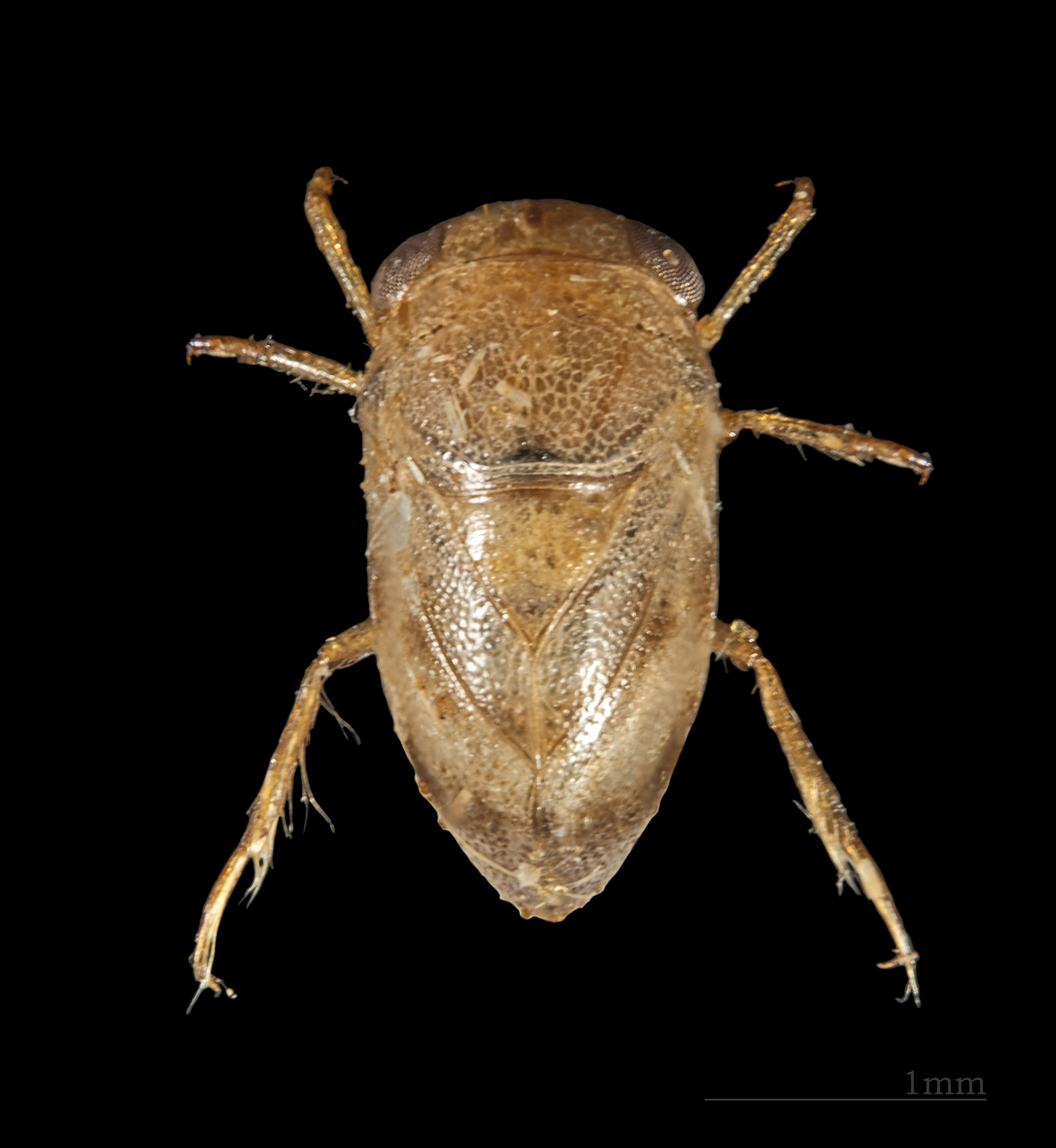
- Plea minutissima

Scientific classification
- Kingdom: Animalia
- Phylum: Arthropoda
- Clade: Pancrustacea
- Class: Insecta
- Order: Hemiptera
- Suborder: Heteroptera
- Superfamily: Notonectoidea
- Family: Pleidae
- Genus: Plea; Leach, 1818

= Plea (bug) =

Genus of true bugs

Plea is a genus is a genus of pygmy backswimmers in the family Pleidae that occur in the Palearctic (Europe, North Africa, and Asia).

== Species ==
There are two valid species in the genus Plea:

- Plea cryptica Raupach, Charzinski, & Hendrich, 2024
- Plea minutissima Leach, 1818
