= Gymnophthalmus lineatus =

Conservation status
- Least Concern (IUCN 3.1)

Scientific classification
- Kingdom: Animalia
- Phylum: Chordata
- Class: Reptilia
- Order: Squamata
- Family: Gymnophthalmidae
- Genus: Gymnophthalmus
- Species: G. lineatus

Binomial name
- Gymnophthalmus lineatus (Linnaeus, 1758)

Species of lizard

Gymnophthalmus lineatus is a species of lizard in the family Gymnophthalmidae. It is found in Venezuela, Suriname, Aruba, Curaçao, and Bonaire.
