= Auguste Plée =

French naturalist (died 1825)

- Born: 1787; Paris, France
- Died: August 17, 1825 (aged 38); Fort Royal, Martinique
- Citizenship: French
- Scientific career
- Fields: Natural history, botany
- Author abbrev. (botany): Plée

Auguste Plée, born 1787 in Paris and died 17 August 1825 in Fort Royal, Martinique, was a French naturalist.

== Biography ==
Between 1821 and 1823 he was sketching military installations, ports and towns in Puerto Rico. After travelling extensively, and forming numerous collections of plants, he fell sick and died in Martinique.

== Legacy ==
Four species of Caribbean reptiles are named in honor of Plée: Diploglossus pleii, Gymnophthalmus pleii, Mastigodryas pleei, and Pholidoscelis plei.

== Writings ==
His principal works were: Le jeune botaniste, ou entretiens d'un père avec son fils sur la botanique et la physiologie végétale, etc.; (2 vols., Paris, 1812), and Journal de Voyage du Botaniste Auguste Plée, a Travers les Antilles, les Guyanes et le Bresil (2 vols., Paris, 1828). The Muséum national d'Histoire naturelle (MNHN) in Paris published a catalog of Plée's collection in three volumes in 1830.
