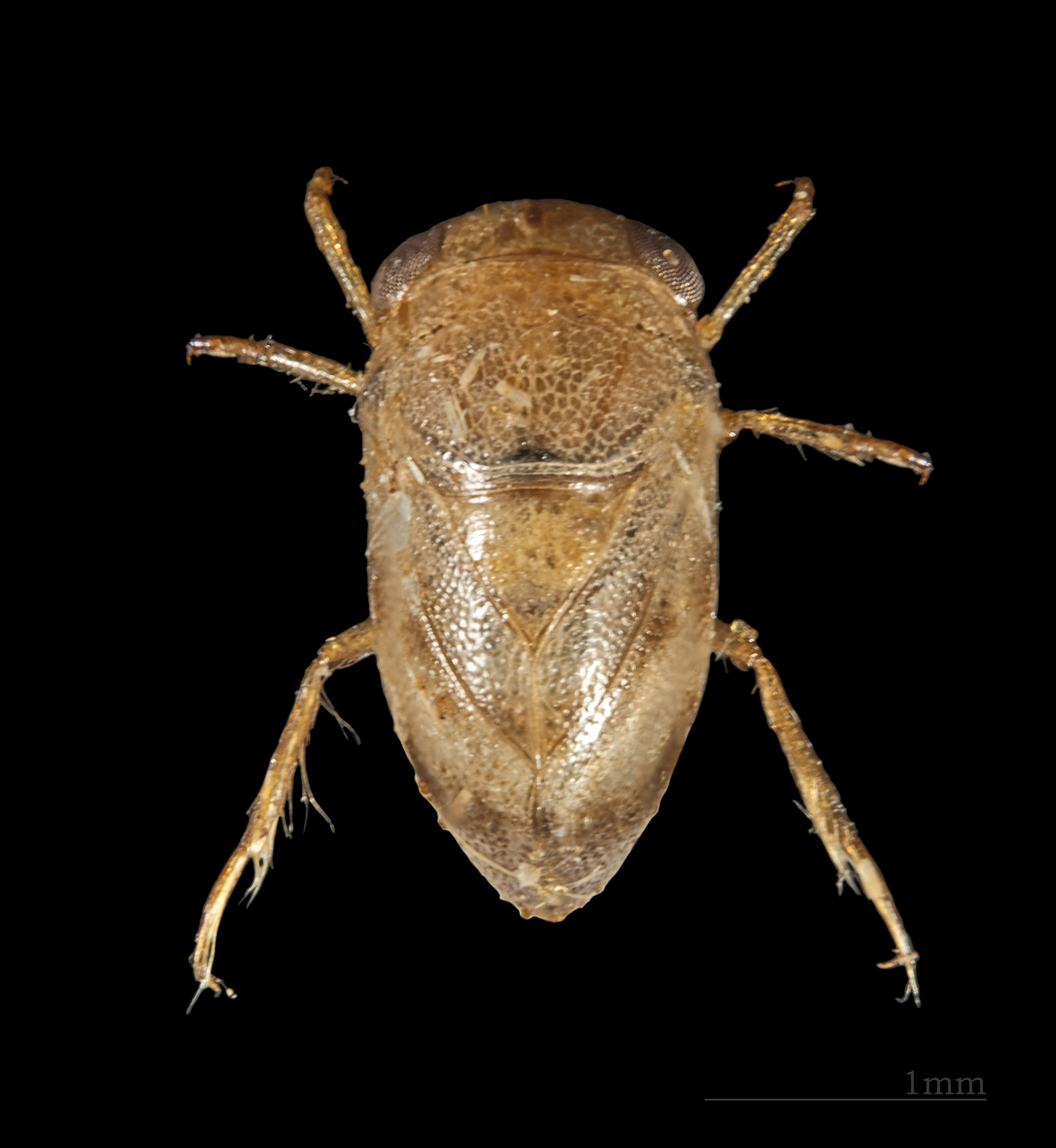
- Plea minutissima - MHNT

Scientific classification
- Kingdom: Animalia
- Phylum: Arthropoda
- Clade: Pancrustacea
- Class: Insecta
- Order: Hemiptera
- Suborder: Heteroptera
- Infraorder: Nepomorpha
- Clade: Tripartita
- Superfamily: Notonectoidea
- Family: Pleidae; Fieber, 1817

Genera
- Heteroplea; Neoplea; Paraplea; Plea

= Pleidae =

Family of true bugs

Pleidae, the pygmy backswimmers, is a family of aquatic insects in the order Hemiptera (infraorder Nepomorpha, or "true water bugs"). There are 52 species in four genera, distributed across most of the world, except the polar regions and remote oceanic islands.

Pleidae belong to the Tripartita which contains the more advanced lineages of true water bugs, and are closely related to the true backswimmers (Notonectidae), but closer still to the Helotrephidae, another family of tiny Nepomorpha, which usually swim upside-down and, like the Pleidae, have a sensory organ in the center of the clypeus. Either the pygmy backswimmers are united with the Helotrephidae in the superfamily Pleoidea, or these two and the true backswimmers are placed in a single superfamily Notonectoidea.

== Distribution ==
In Europe there is a single species, Plea minutissima, widely found in that continent. Plea species occur in the Old World, while Neoplea is found in the Americas. Paraplea can be found in all warmer parts of Earth, including Australia, where four species occur. Given their inability to fly well – if they can fly at all – it is not surprising that the Pleidae do not have as many endemic island taxa as some other Heteroptera (true bugs). Only five species are known from the entire Malesian archipelago for example. Neoplea apopkana has been introduced to the Hawaiian Islands in Polynesia. One species, originally native to South Asia and Southeast Asia, was found in aquaria in New Zealand. In 2006, Paraplea puella was found to be introduced to Guam in Micronesia. Like in the preceding case, this originally American species was probably accidentally introduced with aquarium plants.

== Description ==
These tiny Hemiptera are only 2–3 mm long and usually of a light brownish color overall. Their body is oval, plump, with a concave back. Their compound eyes are large and the ocelli vestigial, like in other Nepomorpha. Also characteristic for the infraorder are the short and weak antennae which are usually carried tucked to the head. In the case of the Pleidae the antennae are shorter than the head is long and only consist of three segments.

The scutellum is small and triangular. The wings are reduced in some fully flightless species, but normally developed in most; due to their compact, rotund bodies and generally short wings, even those with well-developed wings fly weakly at best. By and large the Pleidae may be considered an effectively flightless group when it comes to biogeography and dispersal into new habitat.

The tarsi consist of two or three segments; two claws are borne on the last tarsal segment of the hindlegs. Though the hindlegs are hairless and appear ill-suited for swimming compared to the stout "flippers" of the water boatmen (Corixidae) or the backswimmers (Notonectidae), the small size of the pygmy backswimmers makes for different physics and allows them to swim well regardless.

Both sexes are able to stridulate. The sounds they produce apparently have an intraspecific communication function, as the animals are able to perceive and react to them. Possibly they make sounds to maintain contact among the loose swarms in which the Pleidae roam their habitat.

The larvae have glands between the third and fourth abdominal tergite. Development is direct, without a pupal stage.

== Ecology ==
Pygmy backswimmers inhabit lacustrine ecosystems, where they occur in loose groups. An example of a pygmy backswimmer habitat is a suburban pond with abundant filamentous algae. Like many of their relatives, they are predatory, hunting other tiny invertebrates, from which they suck out the body fluids with their rostrum. They can to some extent biologically control mosquito larvae. Unlike true backswimmers (Notonectidae), they are completely harmless to humans, as their rostrum is far too small to pierce skin.

Their hindleg claws enable them to clamber through vegetation which apart from swimming is their main form of locomotion. Like Notonectidae, they are in an upside-down position when swimming. This is ultimately because as all true water bugs, Pleidae are air-breathers without gills. Similar to the true backswimmers, pygmy backswimmers carry an air reserve with them which is periodically replenished by a dash to the water's surface. This air is contained in a felt-like cushion on the underside. Thus, the belly has higher buoyancy, resulting in the animal turning upside down as soon as it lets loose from the substrate.
