= Kingdom of Redonda =

Micronation in the West Indies

- Micronation (unrecognised entity)
- The island of Redonda in 2023
- Area claimed: Redonda, Caribbean Sea
- Claimed by: Matthew Dowdy Shiell (1865) (traditional); Matthew Phipps Shiell (1880 or 1929); See the list of monarchs
- Dates claimed: July 21, 1865; 161 years ago (traditional); 1929; 97 years ago (historical)

The Kingdom of Redonda is a micronation associated with the tiny uninhabited Caribbean island of Redonda.

The island lies between the islands of Nevis and Montserrat, within the inner arc of the Leeward Islands chain, in the West Indies. Redonda is part of the country of Antigua and Barbuda. The island is just over one mile (1.6 km) long and one-third mile (0.54 km) wide, rising to a 971-foot (296 m) peak. In September 2023, the Redonda Ecosystem Reserve was established, covering nearly 30,000 hectares (74,000 acres) of land and sea, making it the largest marine protected area in the region. The island teems with bird life, but is more or less uninhabitable by humans because there is no source of freshwater other than rain, and most of the island is extremely steep and rocky, with only a relatively small, sloping plateau area of grassland at the summit. Landing on the island is a very challenging process, possible only via the leeward coast on days when the seas are calm. Climbing to the top of the island is also very arduous. Despite these difficulties, from 1865 until 1912, Redonda was part of a lucrative trade in guano mining, and many thousands of tons of phosphates were shipped from Redonda to Britain. The ruins associated with the mineworkings can still be seen on the island.

Various parties claim Redonda as a micronation. In 1929, the fantasy writer M. P. Shiel claimed that the Kingdom of Redonda was established by his father in 1865, and that he himself had become king in 1880. The title to the supposed kingdom is still contested to this day in a half-serious fashion. The "Kingdom" is also often associated with a number of supposedly aristocratic members, whose titles are awarded by whoever is currently the "King".

== History ==
The early history of the Kingdom of Redonda is uncertain, although a folk memory and oral history of the coronation of Shiel still exists on Montserrat.

=== During Shiel's lifetime ===
Matthew Phipps Shiell, known as M. P. Shiel (1865–1947), authored works of adventure and fantasy fiction. On July 2, 1898, a serial published by M. P. Shiel in Pearson's Weekly described the Island of Redonda in detail, the narrator noting that he had enjoyed the view from the summit twice. This novel, Contraband of War, was later published in 1899. In 1929, he was the first person to give an account of the "Kingdom of Redonda," in a promotional pamphlet for a reissue of his books. According to The Times in 1937, Shiell noted "It's something like half a century since I saw my beautiful little kingdom, a green gem set in a blue sea."

According to Shiel's story, his father Matthew Dowdy Shiell, who descended from ancient Irish royalty and who was a trader and Methodist lay preacher from the nearby island of Montserrat, claimed the island of Redonda when his son, Matthew Phipps Shiell, was born in 1865. Supposedly the father felt he could legitimately do this, because it appeared to be the case that no country had officially claimed the islet as territory. Shiell senior is also said to have requested the title of King of Redonda from Queen Victoria and according to the legend, it was granted to him by the British Colonial Office rather than by Victoria herself, provided there was no revolt against colonial power.

The junior Shiell claimed he was crowned on Redonda at the age of 15, in 1880, by a bishop from Antigua.

Shiel cited two different names for the bishop who performed the coronation: the Reverend Dr Mitchinson and the Rev. Hugh Semper. These men were both genuine clerics in the Caribbean during the year in question. In "About Myself", Shiel writes that he attempted to impose a tribute tax on the American guano miners, but the request was refused. There has been no independent evidence provided of any such demands.

Several of Shiel's works of fiction concerned various aspects of monarchy. One of his detective heroes is called Cummings King Monk. In Shiel's 1901 end-of-the-world story The Purple Cloud, the protagonist Adam Jeffson, the last man on earth, establishes himself as monarch of the devastated globe, while Shiel's novel The Lord of the Sea (1901) has Richard Hogarth, another Overman figure, coming to dominate the world.

The United Kingdom annexed the island in 1869, formalizing in 1872. The United Kingdom incorporated the island into their colony of Antigua, however after Shiel's death, in response to a newspaper's c.1958 inquiry, the British Colonial Office publicly stated their ownership over the island did not affect the claimed sovereignty of the Shiel family. Later, in 1981, the Colony Antigua and Barbuda gained independence from the United Kingdom with rights to the island transferred to the new State. In 2007, the UK's Foreign and Commonwealth Office stated that His Majesty's Government recognized the island as a dependent territory of Antigua and Barbuda.

=== After Shiel's death ===
In 1936, Shiel gave the title, and the rights to his work, to his admirer, London poet and editor John Gawsworth (Terence Ian Fytton Armstrong). Gawsworth (1912-1970) was the biographer of Arthur Machen and previously the realm's Archduke. He seems to have passed on the title several times when low in funds. Gawsworth's realm has been facetiously termed "Almadonda" by the Shielian scholar A. Reynolds Morse (1914–2000) after the Alma pub in Westbourne Grove, Bayswater, London, where Gawsworth frequently held court in the 1960s as "King Juan".

According to Travis Elborough, Gawsworth placed an advertisement in The New York Times on June 21, 1958 offering his 'Caribbean Kingship with Royal prerogative for sale'. He was approached and given an advance payment of £50 from Prince Bertil of Sweden, though the deal never materialized since he previously sold the kingship elsewhere to settle a debt. Sometime later, both the original purchaser and his only son died within months of each-other, leaving Gawsworth able to appoint a new heir, though there have been ongoing disputes regarding who, if anyone, he left his kingship to.

=== After Gawsworth's death ===
After Gawsworth's death, the title fragmented. He had apparently promised to make Max Juan Tonge Leggett, the first son of his friends Charles and Jean Leggett, his Redondan heir if they gave the child (born in the late 1950s) his royal name of Juan. The writer Dominic Behan (1928–89) claimed Gawsworth transferred the title to him in 1960. It is also said that Gawsworth handed on the throne to Aleph Kamal, whose peers include the novelist Edna O'Brien. Some researchers accept that Gawsworth bestowed the title on his friend the publican Arthur John Roberts in 1967, by "Irrevocable Covenant".

Self-appointed monarchs of Redonda include/included Michael Lawler in 2010, Marvin Kitman and William Scott Home. Scott Home's claim to the title was, he says, based on ESP and reincarnation.

Publisher, author and environmentalist Jon Wynne-Tyson, however, claims that Gawsworth, prior to his death in 1970, bestowed the kingship upon him along with the literary executorships, although the writer Iain Fletcher was the joint literary executor for Gawsworth. Gawsworth's will reportedly appointed Wynne-Tyson as his successor, who ruled as King Juan II and visited Redonda in 1979, on an expedition organized by the philanthropist and Shielian publisher A. Reynolds Morse. Wynne-Tyson chose the kingdom's motto "Ride si sapis".

Margaret Parry, c.1993, claimed her father Caesar Kenneth Shiel had been given the throne by his father Matthew Phipps Shiell. Though before his death, Matthew Phipps Shiell did not recognize the paternity of Caesar Kenneth Shiel, and it is unknown whether Caesar Kenneth Shiel claimed the throne at all.

Kingdom of Redonda's Flag (contested)

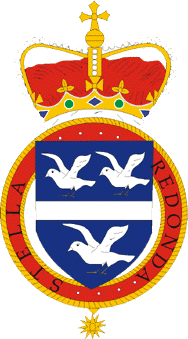
Kingdom of Redonda's Coat of Arms (contested)

== Later developments ==
Clergyman Paul de Fortis sought a successor to Wynne-Tyson, promoting Cedric Boston (born on Montserrat in 1960) as the new king. Boston claimed the Redondan throne in 1984, winning the allegiance of a number of Gawsworth's peers. In 1988, De Fortis established "The Redondan Cultural Foundation". In 1993 Roger Dobson, also of the Redonda Cultural Foundation, identified Shiel's grand daughter Margaret Parry as Queen. Recognising the counter claims, Dobson said she was "certainly" a princess and had a claim to be Queen. Parry subsequently issued a statutory declaration that only her claim was legally valid under British law.

Wynne-Tyson eventually abdicated in favour of the novelist Javier Marías of Madrid in 1997, transferring the literary executorship of Gawsworth and Shiel along with the title. After Marias took the throne he established the Reino de Redonda book imprint, which closed after his death.

William Leonard Gates, whom Gawsworth had given the title of "Baron L'Angelier de Blythswood de Redonda", claimed Arthur John Roberts' title after Roberts' death. From his home at Thurlton, Norfolk, Gates, who was known as King Leo, presided over a group known as "The Redondan Foundation". King Leo 'reigned' as king for thirty years, from 1989. Gates died on 2 January 2019 and his crown was inherited by his wife, Queen Josephine.

In 2000 Bob Williamson, who lived on Antigua until his death in 2009, claimed the throne for himself as "King Bob the Bald", and sold Redonda branded souvenirs to tourists. Williamson later claimed that Wynne-Tyson instructed him to sail to the island of Redonda and claim sovereignty, in addition to collecting taxes from Antigua, though other claimants and researchers question the validity of the story.

Wynne-Tyson, Javier Marías, Bob Williamson, and Cedric Boston were all interviewed in the BBC Radio 4 documentary Redonda: The Island with Too Many Kings, broadcast in May 2007. Roger Dobson, who researched and wrote the programme, spoke to "Queen Maggie", who had visited the island in June 1993, but she declined to participate, saying she did not "take the title very seriously."

Various people have been given a "peerage" status in Redonda. Generally, these were writer friends of Shiel's and Gawsworth in the early years of the Kingdom. They include Arthur Machen, Oliver Stonor, Edgar Jepson, Thomas Burke, Victor Gollancz, Carl Van Vechten, Arthur Ransome, Lawrence Durrell, Gerald Durrell, G. S. Fraser, Michael Harrison, John Heath-Stubbs, Dylan Thomas, Henry Miller, Julian MacLaren-Ross, Philip Lindsay, Rebecca West, John Waller, August Derleth, Stephen Graham, Dorothy L. Sayers, J. B. Priestley, Eden Phillpotts, Stephen Potter, Martin Secker, Frank Swinnerton, John Wain, and Julian Symons. This practice has continued with later kings; examples include the artist Stephen Chambers, ennobled in 2017.

On the question of the Kingdom of Redonda, Wynne-Tyson has written:

The legend is and should remain a pleasing and eccentric fairy tale; a piece of literary mythology to be taken with salt, romantic sighs, appropriate perplexity, some amusement, but without great seriousness. It is, after all, a fantasy.

=== Death of King Xavier I (Javier Marias) ===
On 11 September 2022, Javier Marías died in Madrid. It was reported that Xavier I had named Juan Gabriel Vásquez as his successor, however, Vásquez later clarified that an official naming ceremony had never taken place.

In August 2022, Spanish writer Javier Diéguez visited the island of Redonda and left some books by Javier Marías, M. P. Shiel, and Jon Wynne-Tyson as a tribute to Javier Marías and the previous monarchs of Redonda. Diéguez's book 'Redonda' narrates his journey to the island and serves as a posthumous tribute to Javier Marías.

== List of monarchs ==
Original kingship claims
Title	Claimant
King	Matthew Dowdy Shiell (1865–1880)
King Felipe I	Matthew Phipps Shiell (1880–1947)
King Juan I	John Gawsworth (1947–1967 or 1970)

Disputed kingship claims by faction (as of October 2026)
Period	Roberts	Fletcher	Wynne-Tyson	Williamson	Shiell
c.1967 to c.1980s	Arthur John Roberts (1967–1989)	Ian Fletcher (c.1970-c.1970)	Jon Wynne-Tyson (c.1970–1997)	none	none
c.1980s to c.1990s	continued	Giancarlo Ezio Noferi (c.1970–2019)	Cedric Boston (1984–c.1989)	none	none
c.1990s to c.2020s	William Leonard Gates (1989–2019)	continued	Javier Marías Franco (1997–2022)	Robert 'Bob' Williamson (1998 or 2000–2009)	Margaret Parry (1993–2021)
c.2020s to present	"Queen Josephine I" (2019–present	Giuseppe Garbarino (2019–present)	contested	Mike Howorth (2009–Present)	Simone Hinchey (2021–present)

Disputed independent kingship claims
Claimant
Dominic Behan (1960-unknown)
Max Juan Tonge Leggett (1970-c.2000)
William Scott Home (c.1974–post-1980s)
William Leo Timlin (2008–unknown)
Michael Lawler (c.2010–present)
Marvin Kitman (unknown)

Original claims:

- Matthew Dowdy Shiell, 1865–1880
- Matthew Phipps Shiell, 1880–1947 (styled as King Felipe I)
- John Gawsworth, 1947–1967 or 1970 (styled as King Juan I)

Disputed claims:

- Arthur John Roberts, February 1967–1989 (styled as King Juan II)
- Jon Wynne-Tyson, 1970–1997 (styled as King Juan II)
- Max Juan Tonge Leggett, potential godson of John Gawsworth, 1970–c.2000 (styled as King Juan II)
- Giancarlo Ezio Noferi, c.1970–2019 (styled as H.R.H. Giancarlo Ezio I of Montedoglio)
- William Leonard Gates, October 26, 1989–2019 (styled as King Leo I)
- Josephine, Gates' wife, 2019–present (styled as Queen Josephine I)
- Cedric Boston, 1984–c.1989 (styled as King Cedric I)
- William Scott Home, c.1974–post-1980s (styled as H. S. M. Guillermo I)
- Margaret Parry, daughter of Caesar Kenneth Shiel and granddaughter of M. P. Shiel, 1993–2021 (styled as Queen Maggie)
- Javier Marías Franco, 1997–2022 (styled as King Xavier I)
- Robert 'Bob' Williamson, 1998 or 2000–2009 (styled as King Bob the Bald)
- William Leo Timlin, 2008–unknown (styled as His Imperial and Royal Majesty William I, not to be confused with King Leo)
- Mike Howorth, December 11, 2009–Present (styled as King Michael the Grey)
- Giuseppe G. Garbarino, 2013 (title) 2019 (occupation)–present (styled as H.R.H. Josè Juan I)
- Simone Hinchey (née Parry), 2021–present (styled as Queen Simone)
- Michael Lawler, c.2010–present (styled as King Michael)
- Marvin Kitman, unknown (styled as President of the Redondan Republic)

== In popular culture ==
In 2007, the Wellington Arms pub in Southampton, England, attempted to declare itself an embassy of Bob Williamson's Redonda, in order to gain diplomatic immunity from a nationwide ban on smoking in enclosed workplaces, including pubs. This ultimately failed when the Foreign and Commonwealth Office pointed out that His Majesty's Government recognises Redonda as a dependent territory of Antigua and Barbuda which, accordingly, is not entitled to establish a separate embassy or high commission in the United Kingdom.
