= John Gawsworth =

British writer (1912–1970)

- Born: Terence Ian Fytton Armstrong; 29 June 1912; London, England
- Died: 23 September 1970 (aged 58); London, England
- Other names: T. I. F. Armstrong; Orpheus Scrannel; T E Shavian; King Juan 1
- Occupations: Writer, poet and anthologist

Terence Ian Fytton Armstrong (29 June 1912 – 23 September 1970), better known as John Gawsworth (and also sometimes known as T. I. F. Armstrong), was a British writer, poet and compiler of anthologies, both of poetry and of short stories. He also used the pseudonym Orpheus Scrannel (alluding to the "scrannel pipes" in Milton's Lycidas). He declared himself king of the unrecognized micronation of the Kingdom of Redonda in 1947, and started calling himself King Juan I.

== Early life ==
Armstrong grew up in Colville Gardens, Notting Hill, and at number 40 Royal Crescent, Holland Park, London. He was educated at Merchant Taylors' School.

== Career ==
As a very young man, he moved in London literary circles championing traditional verse and writing as opposed to modernism. He ran the Twyn Barlwm Press, a small press publishing some well-known poets, its title inspired by the mountain Twyn Barlwm in South Wales, beloved by one of his literary idols Arthur Machen. Machen was one of the surviving writers of the 1890s he admired and befriended. Gawsworth's longest piece of written work was a biography of Machen, but he could find no publisher for it in the 1930s. It was finally published by Tartarus Press in 2005.

Other writers Gawsworth admired were Edgar Jepson and M. P. Shiel, whose literary executor he would later become.

In 1931, Gawsworth had the poem In Winter by W. H. Davies privately printed in a limited edition of 290 numbered copies, illustrated by Edward Carrick and all individually signed by Davies. A further special limited edition of 15 were printed on handmade paper and also hand-coloured by Carrick. Three companion titles appeared in similar editions at the same time: In Spring by Edith Sitwell, In Summer by Edmund Blunden and In Autumn by Herbert Palmer.

He gave Hugh MacDiarmid a roof over his head in London in 1934 (MacDiarmid returned the compliment in When the Rat-Race Is Over; an essay in honour of the fiftieth birthday of John Gawsworth (1962)). At this time he was very much involved in compiling (usually anonymously) story collections, generally of the fiction of the supernatural. Poetry collections of this time were Lyrics to Kingcup (1932), Mishka and Madeleine. A Poem Sequence for Marcia (1932), Poems 1930–1932 (1936), New Poems 1939. Later he published through the Richards Press.

He met and befriended the young Lawrence Durrell in 1932, when Gawsworth was living in Denmark Street. He made friends as well as enemies (Dylan Thomas, George Woodcock) throughout literary London.

=== World War II ===
During World War II, he served, under the alias T E Shavian, in the Royal Air Force as an aircraftman in North Africa (T. E. Shaw being the postwar name adopted by T. E. Lawrence). As one of the Cairo poets, he made a more serious name for himself, being part of the Salamander group. Later he returned to a picturesque eccentricity as a Fitzrovian. His Collected Poems appeared in 1949. A later volume is Toreros (1990).

The Known Signatures anthology (reactionary, quite literally) was prompted by the Michael Roberts New Country collection. The Edwardian Poetry Book One (1936) (edited anonymously) and Neo-Georgian Poetry 1936–1937 (edited anonymously by Gawsworth) are extraordinary for their retrospective vision.

=== King of Redonda ===
As literary executor to M. P. Shiel, Armstrong also inherited the throne of the Kingdom of Redonda styling himself H.M. Juan I. The independent publisher Jon Wynne-Tyson became Gawsworth's literary executor in 1970, also becoming H.M. Juan II but Wynne-Tyson "abdicated" in favour of the Spanish novelist and translator Javier Marías— H.M. Xavier I – who became both Shiel's and Gawsworth's literary executor.

According to John Sutherland's Lives of the Novelists, "the excessively minor poet John Gawsworth" kept the ashes of M. P. Shiel "in a biscuit tin on his mantelpiece, dropping a pinch as condiment into the food of any particularly honoured guest".

== Anthologies edited (fiction) ==
- 1932 (October): Strange Assembly: New Stories of 1932 (Unicorn Press). The only anthology credited under the name John Gawsworth. Despite the subtitle, this is a mixture of new and reprint stories. Some of the contents were reprinted in Gawsworth's anonymous Thrills, Crimes and Mysteries (1935).
- 1933 (January): Full Score: Twenty-five Stories. (Rich & Cowan). Non-fantastic stories. The only anthology credited under the name T. I. Fytton-Armstrong.
- 1934 (December): New Tales of Horror by Eminent Authors (Hutchinson). Anthology edited anonymously. despite the emphasis on the "New," thirteen of the thirty stories had seen earlier periodical publication.
- 1935 (month?): Thrills, Crimes and Mysteries: A Specially Selected Collection of Sixty-Three Complete Stories by Well-Known Writers (Associated Newspapers). Anthology edited anonymously and illustrated by Norman Keane. Includes tales reprinted from Strange Assembly (1932).
- 1935 (month?): Thrills: Twenty Specially Selected New Stories of Crime, Mystery and Horror (Associated Newspapers). Anthology edited anonymously and illustrated by Norman Keane.
- 1936 (month?): Masterpiece of Thrills (Daily Express). Anthology edited anonymously. One collaboration in this volume, "Kametis and Evelpis", was by J. Leslie Mitchell, writing with Fytton Armstong, Gawsworth's real name. And Gawsworth as Gawsworth added his name to three tales by M. P. Shiel: "Dr. Todoro Karadja", "The Mystery of the Red Road", and "The Hanging of Ernest Clark". The first of these borrows from "He Wakes an Echo" in Shiel's short-story collection, The Pale Ape and Other Pulses (1911). Reportedly this book was a newspaper give-away.
- 1936 (month?): Crimes, Creeps and Thrills:Forty-Five New Stories of Detection, Horror and Adventure by Eminent Modern Authors (E. H. Samuel). With 30 unattributed illustrations.
- 1945 (October): Twenty Tales of Terror: Great New Stories (Calcutta: Susil Gupta). This anthology reprints fourteen stories from Thrills, Crimes and Mysteries (1935) and six stories from Thrills (1936).
