= William Scott Home =

American author, poet, and biologist (born 1940

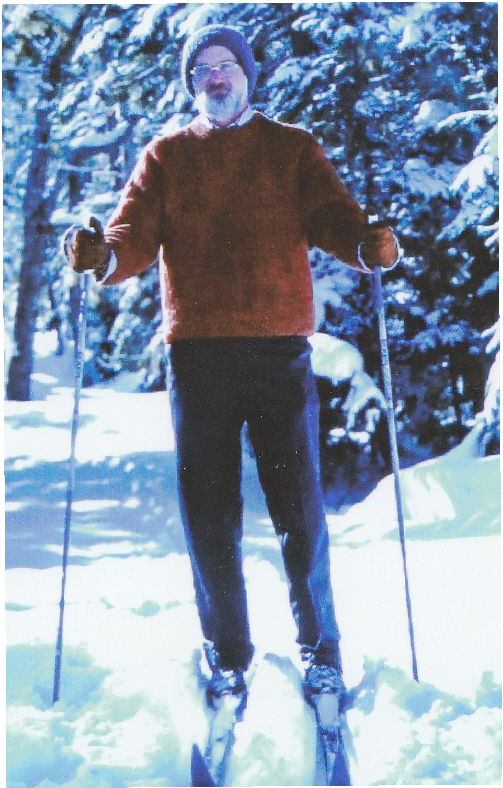
Photo of horror writer William Scott Home, taken in Alaska.

William Scott Home (born January 2, 1940) is the pen name (and, later, legal name) of an American author, poet and biologist principally known for writing horror and dark fantasy. Best known for a short story that appeared in 1978 in The Year's Best Horror Stories (along with Stephen King's "Children of the Corn", which also made the cut that year), Home was most prolific during the 1970s and 80s when his poetry and fiction was published in a wide range of media. Part of a circle of Science Fiction, Fantasy and Horror writers that paid homage to M. P. Shiel and H. P. Lovecraft, Home is considered by many to be a unique talent in his own right. His range of styles and control of language and suspense is well-demonstrated in his published collection: Hollow Faces, Merciless Moons. While he has published little since the 1980s, Home is still writing and currently lives in the Dyea Valley, west of Skagway, Alaska.

== Early life ==
Home was born in Windsor, Missouri, and grew up in a Protestant family of musicians and Bible scholars. He earned a BA in zoology in 1964 from the University of Minnesota and an MS in zoology in 1982 from the University of Alaska. He taught biology, chemistry, and geography in Belize and the Caribbean before taking a series of government jobs in Alaska.

== Writings ==
=== Fiction ===
At age 17, Home had his first work published in a national magazine. The fantasy piece, published in Sir! under the "True Stories" heading, centered on an imagined visit to a snake handler's ceremony. While he had a number of mainstream poems printed in "little magazines" during high school years, it was not until the publication of his story, "The Fruits of Yebo's Sins", in Weirdbook in 1971 that he found his niche. Home would publish repeatedly with Weirdbook and its editor/publisher W. Paul Ganley for the next decade.

Soon after his first publication in Weirdbook, other horror fiction-themed magazines began printing his stories as well. In 1972, both his story "Dull Scavengers Wax Crafty" and an essay were published in Meade and Penny Frierson's epochal HPL, a tribute to H. P. Lovecraft. His 1977 Weirdbook story "Deadlier at Hearth than Hunt" was not only published several times in English, but also as an Italian translation (1995).

In 1977 Ganley published a collection of Home's short stories, Hollow Faces, Merciless Moons, illustrated by fantasy art legend Stephen E. Fabian. One story, "A Cobweb of Pulsing Veins", was chosen for The Year's Best Horror Stories, Series VI. In 1986 Home was mentioned twice in The Penguin Encyclopedia of Horror and the Supernatural.

Home's published short fiction includes:

Story Title	Publication: Pages	Year
The Fruits of Yebo's Sins	Weirdbook 4: 3-9	1971
Dull Scavengers Wax Crafty	HPL: 118-123	1972
Even the Sea Monster Offers the Breast	Weirdbook 6: 28-30	1973
Lineage of the Empty Dead	Spoor Anthology 2: 62-93	1974
The Dead Eyes	Weirdbook 8: 23-30	1974
The Black Footprints	Toadstool Wine (A Collection of Fantasy and Horror from Six Independent Magazines): 37-39	1975
Deadlier at Hearth than Hunt	Weirdbook 11: 16-19	1977
Deadlier at Hearth than Hunt	Alpha Gallery: 195-205	1990
The Utter Dark Where Blind White Sea Snakes Crawl	Hollow Faces, Merciless Moons[8b]	1977
The Uncomfortable Words	Hollow Faces, Merciless Moons	
The Silver Judgement, Echoing	Hollow Faces, Merciless Moons	
Acid Soul and Sulphurous Sweat	Hollow Faces, Merciless Moons	
The Last Golem	Hollow Faces, Merciless Moons	
The Lamps are Lighted in the House of Hides	Hollow Faces, Merciless Moons	
The Parasite	Hollow Faces, Merciless Moons	
What Breeds About Her Heart	Hollow Faces, Merciless Moons	
Ship of Ghouls	Hollow Faces, Merciless Moons	
Chameleon That Blinks Barbed Stars	Hollow Faces, Merciless Moons	
A Cobweb of Pulsing Veins	Hollow Faces, Merciless Moons	
Cancerous Kisses of Crocodiles	Weirdbook 12: 24-27	1977
A Cobweb of Pulsing Veins	The Year's Best Horror Stories, Series VI: 113	1978
Black Silver, Gold, and Purple	Weirdbook 14: 26-28	1979
The Red Shift	Paragon, No. 1: 5-14	1980
Prisoner of the Omega	Weirdbook 15: 49	1981
The Hell of Black Lines	Weirdbook 16: 35-38	1982

=== Articles ===
In 1976, Home's essay "Eine Kleine Machen-Musik" was published in the Lovecraft fanzine Nyctalops, and in 1983 he contributed "The Rose Beyond the Thunders and the Whirlpools" to A. Reynolds Morse's massive volume Shiel in Diverse Hands: A Collection of Essays on M.P. Shiel. His paper, "The Lovecraft 'Books': Some Addenda and Corrigenda" (originally published in 1966 in August Derleth's The Dark Brotherhood and Other Pieces) was translated into French and published in the prestigious Cahiers L'Herne in 1969. In 1987, Thomas Ligotti included Home's essay "The Horror Theme after H. P. Lovecraft" (first published in HLP) in the Gale Research compilation Twentieth Century Literary Criticism.

=== Poetry ===
Home's poetry appeared regularly in Weirdbook and Ganley's Amanita Brandy (starting with issue No. 1). In the early 1980s, John D. Squires made a photocopy booklet of his own favorites from among Homes's poems, including Onyx and Bloodstone and The Ransom of Enchanted Castles; copies of the informal collection still show up on the book market now and then. In 1985, Randy Everts of The Strange Company published two collections of Home's original verse: Black Diamond Gates, pieces reflecting the 1200-1600 AD era of magic and experimental science; and Stain of Moonlight, which offers more general poems.

=== Translations ===
French was the first of several languages Home translated into English, beginning with Jose-Maria de Heredia's French sonnets "Fuite de Centaures" ("Flight of the Centaurs"), published in Flame. By the early 1980s, small magazines, such as Nightshade, were publishing Home's translations from French, Spanish and Portuguese.

=== Scientific Publications ===
In addition to his fiction writing, through the 1970s and 1980s, Home produced a large number of biological and anthropological writings, some book-length. His 50-page study, The Chilkoot and Chilkat: A Capsule History, encompassed forty years of research into the Tlinkit history of the Upper Lynn Canal and Glacier Bay in Alaska.

== Critical Reviews ==
In a 1997 article on what went into creating HPL, Meade Frierson specifically notes Home’s contributions and his "fine article displaying the breadth of his knowledge of the field of weird". Commenting on his later inclusion of Home's article as part of the Lovecraft commentary in the monumental Twentieth Century Literary Criticism series, Ligotti praised it as "lucid and insightful". [15b] On choosing one of Home's stories for The Year's Best Horror Stories, Series VI, editor Gerald W. Page noted that, despite the limited circulation of the small magazines such as Weirdbook, where Home's stories were typically published, Home himself exercised a wide influence on the horror fantasy field.

Reviewers and critics, however, have often shown mixed feelings about Home's writing. Page, in his introduction to The Year's Best Horror Stories, calls Home "a writer who is sometimes difficult, but who is usually vivid and often original."[9b] In 2011, Ligotti named Hollow Faces, Merciless Moons the weirdest piece of fiction he had ever read:
... so complex and recondite that it's all but unreadable, much like that of Clark Ashton Smith. Furthermore, Home's narratives are baffling and sometime barely comprehensible, somewhat in the manner of Robert Aickman. For a while I thought that Home was either an inexpert writer or a mental case. Then I found an essay by him ... [that] was lucid and insightful.

== Kingdom of Redonda ==
Home has also made a claim to the throne of the Kingdom of Redonda, taking the name Guillermo I and proclaiming his Thaumaturgical Reincarnate Legitimacy as Shiel's successor. In 1974, Ben Indick, responding to Home's pieces in Frierson's HPL, declared William Scott Home to be the stylistic reincarnation of the writer M. P. Shiel (first King of Redonda), an event recounted by John D. Squires in his essay on the Redonda Legend.
