= The Works of M. P. Shiel =

- Dust-jacket from the first edition
- Author: by A. Reynolds Morse
- Cover artist: Salvador Dalí and Jack Gaughan
- Language: English
- Genre: Bibliography of M. P. Shiel
- Publisher: Fantasy Publishing Company, Inc.
- Publication date: 1948
- Publication place: United States
- Media type: Print (Hardback)
- Pages: xvii, 170 pp
- OCLC: 1851953

The Works of M. P. Shiel is a bibliography of works by British author M. P. Shiel. The bibliography was compiled by A. Reynolds Morse. It was first published by Fantasy Publishing Company, Inc. in 1948 in an edition of 1,000 copies.

Morse later revised the book as volumes II & III of a four volume study of Shiel issued by The Reynolds Morse Foundation (now The Salvador Dalí Foundation) 1979-1983. The series included one volume of photo-offsets of the periodical versions of two novels, The Empress of the Earth, The Purple Cloud, and 15 short stories, one volume of bibliography, greatly expanded from the 1948 edition, a volume of mostly biographical material with some bibliographical material, including a section on sometime Shiel collaborator, Louis Tracy, and a final volume of essays about Shiel.
