= The Dark Brotherhood and Other Pieces =

1966 collection of stories, poems and essays edited by August Derleth

- Dust jacket illustration by Frank Utpatel.
- Editor: August Derleth
- Author: H. P. Lovecraft and others
- Cover artist: Frank Utpatel
- Language: English
- Genre: Fantasy, horror
- Publisher: Arkham House
- Publication date: 1966
- Publication place: United States
- Media type: Print (hardback)
- Pages: x, 321

The Dark Brotherhood and Other Pieces is a collection of stories, poems and essays by American author H. P. Lovecraft and others, edited by August Derleth. It was released in 1966 by Arkham House in an edition of 3,460 copies. The dustjacket is by Frank Utpatel.

Some controversy was raised by the publication of the Chalker bibliography (see below), as George T. Wetzel claimed with some plausibility that Chalker had pirated Wetzel's own bibliography of 1955.

== Contents ==
The Dark Brotherhood and Other Pieces contains the following pieces:

1. "Introduction", by August Derleth
2. "The Dark Brotherhood" by H. P. Lovecraft and August Derleth
3. "Suggestions for a Reading Guide", by H. P. Lovecraft
4. "Alfredo", by H. P. Lovecraft
5. "Amateur Journalism: Its Possible Needs and Betterment", by H. P. Lovecraft
6. "What Belongs in Verse", by H. P. Lovecraft
7. Six Poems, by H. P. Lovecraft
  - "Bells"
  - "Oceanus"
  - "Clouds"
  - "Mother Earth"
  - "Cindy"
  - "On a Battlefield in France"
8. Three Stories by C. M. Eddy, Jr.
  - "The Loved Dead"
  - "Deaf, Dumb, and Blind"
  - "The Ghost-Eater"
9. "The Lovecraft "Books": Some Addenda and Corrigenda", by William Scott Home
10. "To Arkham and the Stars", by Fritz Leiber
11. "Through Hyperspace With Brown Jenkin", by Fritz Leiber
12. "Lovecraft and the New England Megaliths", by Andrew E. Rothovius
13. "Howard Phillips Lovecraft: A Bibliography", by Jack L. Chalker
14. "Walks With H. P. Lovecraft", by C. M. Eddy, Jr.
15. "The Cancer of Superstition", by C. M. Eddy, Jr.
16. "The Making of a Hoax", by August Derleth
17. "Lovecraft's Illustrators", by John E. Vetter
18. "Final Notes", by August Derleth

== Sources ==
- Jaffery, Sheldon (1989). The Arkham House Companion. Mercer Island, WA: Starmont House, Inc. p. 82. ISBN 1-55742-005-X.
- Chalker, Jack L.; Mark Owings (1998). The Science-Fantasy Publishers: A Bibliographic History, 1923-1998. Westminster, MD and Baltimore: Mirage Press, Ltd. pp. 43–44.
- Joshi, S.T. (1999). Sixty Years of Arkham House: A History and Bibliography. Sauk City, WI: Arkham House. p. 95. ISBN 0-87054-176-5.
- Nielsen, Leon (2004). Arkham House Books: A Collector's Guide. Jefferson, NC and London: McFarland & Company, Inc. p. 97. ISBN 0-7864-1785-4.
