= The Year's Best Horror Stories =

The Year’s Best Horror Stories was a series of annual anthologies published by DAW Books in the U.S. from 1972 to 1994 under the successive editorships of Richard Davis from 1972 to 1975 (after a 1971-1973 series published by Sphere Books in the U.K.; the first volumes had the same contents, the U.S. second volume in 1974 drew stories from the second and third U.K. volumes, and the 1975 U.S. third volume was very different from the U.K's.; the U.S. third volume was published as a one-shot volume in the U.K. by Orbit Books in 1976), and of Gerald W. Page from 1976 to 1979, and Karl Edward Wagner from 1980 to 1994. The series was discontinued after Wagner's death. It was a companion to DAW’s The Annual World’s Best SF and The Year's Best Fantasy Stories, which performed a similar function for the science fiction and fantasy fields.

Each annual volume reprinted what in the opinion of the editor was the best horror short fiction appearing in the previous year. The series also aimed to discover and nurture new talent. It featured both occasionally recurring authors and writers new to the horror genre. Veterans among the contributing authors included Brian Lumley, Eddy C. Bertin, Kit Reed, R. Chetwynd-Hayes, Ramsey Campbell, Dennis Etchison, Richard Matheson, Robert Bloch, and Tanith Lee; some of the relative newcomers to the field featured were Stephen King, Al Sarrantonio, Lisa Tuttle, Jessica Amanda Salmonson, David Drake, Juleen Brantingham, and Nina Kiriki Hoffman.

== The series ==
=== Volumes edited by Richard Davis ===
1. The Year’s Best Horror Stories, editor Richard Davis, Sphere Books (UK) 1971; DAW Books (US) 1972

- Double Whammy (1970), by Robert Bloch
- The Sister City (1969), by Brian Lumley
- When Morning Comes (1969), by Elizabeth Fancett
- Prey (1969), by Richard Matheson
- Winter (1969), by Kit Reed
- Lucifer (1969), by E. C. Tubb
- I Wonder What He Wanted (1971), by Eddy C. Bertin
- Problem Child (1970), by Peter Oldale
- The Scar (1969), by Ramsey Campbell
- Warp (1968), by Ralph Norton
- The Hate (1971), by Terri E. Pinckard
- A Quiet Game (1970), by Celia Fremlin
- After Nightfall (1970), by David A. Riley
- Death's Door (1969), by Robert McNear

2 (UK). The Year’s Best Horror Stories II, editor Richard Davis, Sphere Books (UK) 1972.

- Foreword by Christopher Lee
- Thirst (1972), by Gerald W. Page
- David's Worm (1971), by Brian Lumley
- The Price of a Demon (1972), by Gary Brandner
- The Knocker at the Portico (1971), by Basil Copper
- The Throwaway Man (1970), by Stepan Chapman [as by Steve Chapman ]
- The Woman With the Mauve Face (1972), by Rosemary Timperley
- The Shadows of the Living (1970), by Ronald Blythe
- The Animal Fair (1971), by Robert Bloch
- Napier Court (1971), by Ramsey Campbell
- Haunts of the Very Rich (1971) by T. K. Brown, III

3 (UK). The Year’s Best Horror Stories III, editor Richard Davis, Sphere Books (UK) 1973.

- Pages from a Young Girl's Journal (1973), by Robert Aickman
- The Long-Term Residents (1971), by Kit Pedler
- The Mirror from Antiquity (1972), by Susanna Bates
- Like Two White Spiders (1973), by Eddy C. Bertin (trans. of Als Twee Grote Witte Spinnen 1971)
- The Old Horns (1973), by Ramsey Campbell
- Haggopian (1973), by Brian Lumley
- The Recompensing of Albano Pizar (1973), by Basil Copper
- Were-Creature (1971), by Kenneth Pemrooke
- The Events at Poroth Farm (1972), by T. E. D. Klein

2 (US). The Year’s Best Horror Stories: Series II, editor Richard Davis, DAW Books (US) 1974

- Foreword by Christopher Lee
- David's Worm (1971), by Brian Lumley
- The Price of a Demon (1972), by Gary Brandner
- The Knocker at the Portico (1971), by Basil Copper
- The Animal Fair (1971), by Robert Bloch
- Napier Court (1971), by Ramsey Campbell
- Haunts of the Very Rich (1971) by T. K. Brown, III
- The Long-Term Residents (1971), by Kit Pedler
- Like Two White Spiders (1973), by Eddy C. Bertin (trans. of Als Twee Grote Witte Spinnen 1971)
- The Old Horns (1973), by Ramsey Campbell
- Haggopian (1973), by Brian Lumley
- The Events at Poroth Farm (1972), by T. E. D. Klein

3 (US). The Year’s Best Horror Stories: Series III, editor Richard Davis, DAW Books (US) 1975; Orbit Books (UK) 1976 as The First Orbit Book of Horror Stories

- The Whimper of Whipped Dogs (1973), by Harlan Ellison
- The Man in the Underpass (1975), by Ramsey Campbell
- S.F. (1975), by T. E. D. Klein
- Uncle Vlad (1973), by Clive Sinclair
- Judas Story (1975), by Brian Stableford
- The House of Cthulhu (1973), by Brian Lumley
- Satanesque (1974), by Allan Weiss
- Burger Creature (1973) by Stepan Chapman [as by Steve Chapman]
- Wake Up Dead (1975), by Tim Stout
- Forget-Me-Not (1975), by Bernard Taylor
- Halloween Story (1972), by Gregory Fitz Gerald
- Big, Wide, Wonderful World (1958), by Charles E. Fritch
- The Taste of Your Love (1971), by Eddy C. Bertin (trans. of De Smaak van Jouw Liefde 1971)

=== Volumes edited by Gerald W. Page ===
4. The Year’s Best Horror Stories IV, editor Gerald W. Page, 1976.

- Forever Stand The Stones (1975), by Joseph F. Pumilia
- And Don't Forget the One Red Rose (1975), by Avram Davidson
- Christmas Present (1975), by Ramsey Campbell
- A Question of Guilt (1976), by Hal Clement
- The House on Stillcroft Street (1975), by Joseph Payne Brennan
- The Recrudescence of Geoffrey Marvell (1976), by G. N. Gabbard
- Something Had to Be Done (1975), by David Drake
- Cottage Tenant (1975), by Frank Belknap Long
- The Man with the Aura (1974), by R. A. Lafferty
- White Wolf Calling (1975), by Charles L. Grant
- Lifeguard (1975), by Arthur Byron Cover
- The Black Captain (1975), by H. Warner Munn
- The Glove (1975), by Fritz Leiber
- No Way Home (1975), by Brian Lumley
- The Lovecraft Controversy-Why? (1976) essay by E. Hoffmann Price

5. The Year’s Best Horror Stories V, editor Gerald W. Page, 1977.

- The Service (1976), by Jerry Sohl
- Long Hollow Swamp (1976), by Joseph Payne Brennan
- Sing a Last Song of Valdese (1976), by Karl Edward Wagner
- Harold's Blues (1976), by Glen Singer
- The Well (1977), by H. Warner Munn
- A Most Unusual Murder (1976), by Robert Bloch
- Huzdra (1977), by Tanith Lee
- Shatterday (1975), by Harlan Ellison
- Children of the Forest (1976), by David Drake
- The Day It Rained Lizards (1977), by Arthur Byron Cover
- Followers of the Dark Star (1976), by Robert Edmond Alter
- When All the Children Call My Name (1977), by Charles L. Grant
- Belsen Express (1975), by Fritz Leiber
- Where the Woodbine Twineth (1976), by Manly Wade Wellman

6. The Year’s Best Horror Stories VI, editor Gerald W. Page, 1978.

- At the Bottom of the Garden (1975), by David Campton
- Screaming to Get Out (1977), by Janet Fox
- Undertow (1977), by Karl Edward Wagner
- I Can Hear the Dark (1978), by Dennis Etchison
- Ever the Faith Endures (1978), by Manly Wade Wellman
- The Horse Lord (1977), by Lisa Tuttle
- Winter White (1978), by Tanith Lee
- A Cobweb of Pulsing Veins (1977), by William Scott Home
- Best of Luck, (1978), by David Drake
- Children of the Corn (1977), by Stephen King
- If Damon Comes (1978), by Charles L. Grant
- Drawing In (1978), by Ramsey Campbell
- Within the Walls of Tyre (1978), by Michael Bishop
- There's a Long, Long Trail A-Winding (1976), by Russell Kirk

7. The Year’s Best Horror Stories VII, editor Gerald W. Page, 1979.

- The Pitch (1978), by Dennis Etchison
- The Night of the Tiger (1978), by Stephen King
- Amma (1978), by Charles R. Saunders
- Chastel (1979), by Manly Wade Wellman
- Sleeping Tiger (1978), by Tanith Lee
- Intimately, With Rain (1978), by Janet Fox
- The Secret (1966), by Jack Vance
- Hear Me Now, My Sweet Abbey Rose (1978), by Charles L. Grant
- Divers Hands (1979), by Darrell Schweitzer
- Heading Home (1978), by Ramsey Campbell
- In the Arcade (1978), by Lisa Tuttle
- Nemesis Place (1978), by David Drake
- Collaborating (1978), by Michael Bishop
- Marriage (1977), by Robert Aickman

=== Volumes edited by Karl Edward Wagner ===
8. The Year’s Best Horror Stories VIII, editor Karl Edward Wagner, 1980.

- The Dead Line (1979), by Dennis Etchison
- To Wake the Dead (1979), by Ramsey Campbell
- In the Fourth Year of the War (1979), by Harlan Ellison
- From the Lower Deep (1979), by Hugh B. Cave
- The Baby-Sitter (1978), by Davis Grubb
- The Well at the Half Cat (1979), by John Tibbets
- My Beautiful Darkling (1979), by Eddy C. Bertin
- A Serious Call (1979), by George Hay
- Sheets (1979), by Alan Ryan
- Billy Wolfe's Riding Spirit (1979), by Kevin A. Lyons
- Lex Talionis (1979), by Russell Kirk
- Entombed (1979), by Robert Keefe
- A Fly One (1979), by Steve Sneyd
- Needle Song (1979), by Charles L. Grant
- All the Birds Come Home to Roost (1979), by Harlan Ellison
- The Devil Behind You (1979), by Richard A. Moore

9. The Year’s Best Horror Stories IX, editor Karl Edward Wagner, 1981.

- The Monkey (1980), by Stephen King
- The Gap (1980), by Ramsey Campbell
- The Cats of Pere Lachaise (1980), by Neil Olonoff
- The Propert Bequest (1980), by Basil A. Smith
- On Call (1980), by Dennis Etchison
- The Catacomb (1980), by Peter Shilston
- Black Man with a Horn (1980), by T.E.D. Klein
- The King (1980), by William Relling Jr.
- Footsteps (1980), by Harlan Ellison
- Without Rhyme or Reason (1980), by Peter Valentine Timlett

10. The Year’s Best Horror Stories X, editor Karl Edward Wagner, 1982

- Through the Walls (1978), by Ramsey Campbell
- Touring (1981), by Gardner Dozois, Jack Dann, and Michael Swanwick
- Every Time You Say I Love You (1981), by Charles L. Grant
- Wyntours (1980), by David G. Rowlands
- The Dark Country (1981), by Dennis Etchison
- Homecoming (1981), by Howard Goldsmith
- Old Hobby Horse (1981), by A. F. Kidd
- Firstborn (1981), by David Campton
- Luna (1981), by G. W. Perriwils
- Mind (1980), by Les Freeman
- Competition (1981), by David Clayton Carrad
- Egnaro (1981), by M. John Harrison
- On 202 (1981), by Jeff Hecht
- The Trick (1980), by Ramsey Campbell
- Broken Glass (1981), by Harlan Ellison

11. The Year’s Best Horror Stories XI, editor Karl Edward Wagner, 1983.

- The Grab (1982), by Richard Laymon
- The Show Goes On (1982), by Ramsey Campbell
- The House at Evening (1982), by Frances Garfield
- I Hae Dream'd a Dreary Dream (1981), by John Alfred Taylor
- Deathtracks (1982), by Dennis Etchison
- Come, Follow! (1982), by Sheila Hodgson
- The Smell of Cherries (1982), by Jeffrey Goddin
- A Posthumous Bequest (1982), by David Campton
- Slippage (1982), by Michael P. Kube-McDowell
- The Executor (1982), by David G. Rowlands
- Mrs. Halfbooger's Basement (1982), by Lawrence C. Connolly
- Rouse Him Not (1982), by Manly Wade Wellman
- Spare the Child (1982), by Thomas F. Monteleone
- The New Rays (1982), by M. John Harrison
- Cruising (1982), by Donald Tyson
- The Depths (1982), by Ramsey Campbell
- Pumpkin Head (1982), by Al Sarrantonio

12. The Year’s Best Horror Stories XII, editor Karl Edward Wagner, 1984.

- Uncle Otto's Truck (1983), by Stephen King
- 3.47 AM (1983), by David Langford
- Mistral (1983), by Jon Wynne-Tyson
- Out of Africa (1983), by David Drake
- The Wall-Painting (1983), by Roger Johnson
- Keepsake (1983), by Vincent McHardy
- Echoes (1983), by Lawrence C. Connolly
- After-Images (1983), by Malcolm Edwards
- The Ventriloquist's Daughter (1983), by Juleen Brantingham
- Come to the Party (1983), by Frances Garfield
- The Chair (1983), by Dennis Etchison
- Names (1983), by Jane Yolen
- The Attic (1983), by Billy Wolfenbarger
- Just Waiting (1983), by Ramsey Campbell
- One for the Horrors (1983), by David J. Schow
- Elle Est Trois, (La Mort) (1983), by Tanith Lee
- Spring-Fingered Jack (1983), by Susan Casper
- The Flash! Kid (1983), by Scott Bradfield
- The Man with Legs (1983), by Al Sarrantonio

13. The Year’s Best Horror Stories XIII, editor Karl Edward Wagner, 1985.

- Mrs. Todd's Shortcut (1984), by Stephen King
- Are You Afraid of the Dark? (1984), by Charles L. Grant
- Catch Your Death (1984), by John Gordon
- Dinner Party (1984), by Gardner Dozois
- Tiger in the Snow (1984), by Daniel Wynn Barber
- Watch the Birdie (1984), by Ramsey Campbell
- Coming Soon to a Theatre Near You (1984), by David J. Schow
- Hands with Long Fingers (1984), by Leslie Halliwell
- Weird Tales (1984), by Fred Chappell
- The Wardrobe (1984), by Jovan Panich
- Angst for the Memories (1984), by Vincent McHardy
- The Thing in the Bedroom (1984), by David Langford
- Borderland (1984), by John Brizzolara
- The Scarecrow (1984), by Roger Johnson
- The End of the World (1984), by James B. Hemesath
- Never Grow Up (1984), by John Gordon
- Deadlights (1984), by Charles Wagner
- Talking in the Dark (1984), by Dennis Etchison

14. The Year’s Best Horror Stories XIV, editor Karl Edward Wagner, 1986.

- Penny Daye (1985), by Charles L. Grant
- Dwindling (1985), by David B. Silva
- Dead Men's Fingers (1985), by Phillip C. Heath
- Dead Week (1985), by Leonard Carpenter
- The Sneering (1985), by Ramsey Campbell
- Bunny Didn't Tell Us (1985), by David J. Schow
- Pinewood (1984), by Tanith Lee
- The Night People (1985), by Michael Reaves
- Ceremony (1985), by William F. Nolan
- The Women in Black (1984), by Dennis Etchison
- ...Beside the Seaside, Beside the Sea... (1985), by Simon Clark
- Mother's Day (1985), by Stephen F. Wilcox
- Lava Tears (1985), by Vincent McHardy
- Rapid Transit (1985), by Wayne Allen Sallee
- The Weight of Zero (1985), by John Alfred Taylor
- John's Return to Liverpool (1984), by Christopher Burns
- In Late December, Before the Storm (1985), by Paul M. Sammon
- Red Christmas (1985), by David Garnett
- Too Far Behind Gradina (1985), by Steve Sneyd

15. The Year’s Best Horror Stories XV, editor Karl Edward Wagner, 1987.

- The Yougoslaves (1986), by Robert Bloch
- Tight Little Stitches in a Dead Man’s Back (1986), by Joe R. Lansdale
- Apples (1986), by Ramsey Campbell
- Dead White Women (1986), by William F. Wu
- Crystal (1986), by Charles L. Grant
- Retirement (1986), by Ron Leming
- The Man Who Did Tricks With Glass (1986), by Ron Wolfe
- Bird in a Wrought Iron Cage (1986), by John Alfred Taylor
- The Olympic Runner (1986), by Dennis Etchison
- Take the “A” Train (1986), by Wayne Allen Sallee
- The Foggy, Foggy Dew (1986), by Joel Lane
- The Godmother (1986), by Tina Rath
- "Pale, Trembling Youth" (1986), by W. H. Pugmire & Jessica Amanda Salmonson
- Red Light (1986), by David J. Schow
- In the Hour Before Dawn (1986), by Brad Strickland
- Necros (1986), by Brian Lumley
- Tattoos (1986), by Jack M. Dann
- Acquiring a Family (1986), by R. Chetwynd-Hayes

16. The Year’s Best Horror Stories XVI, editor Karl Edward Wagner, 1988.

- Popsy (1987), by Stephen King
- Neighbourhood Watch (1987), by Greg Egan
- Wolf/Child (1987), by Jane Yolen
- Everything to Live For (1987), by Charles L. Grant
- Repossession (1987), by David Campton
- Merry May (1987), by Ramsey Campbell
- The Touch (1987), by Wayne Allen Sallee
- Moving Day (1987), by R. Chetwynd-Hayes
- La Nuit des Chiens (1987), by Leslie Halliwell
- Echoes from the Abbey (1987), by Sheila Hodgson
- Visitors (1987), by Jack Dann
- The Bellfounder’s Wife (1987), by A. F. Kidd
- The Scar (1987), by Dennis Etchison
- Martyr Without Canon (1987), by T. Winter-Damon
- The Thin People (1987), by Brian Lumley
- Fat Face (1987), by Michael Shea

17. The Year’s Best Horror Stories XVII, editor Karl Edward Wagner, 1989.

- Fruiting Bodies (1988), by Brian Lumley
- Works of Art (1988), by Nina Kiriki Hoffman
- She’s a Young Thing and Cannot Leave Her Mother (1988), by Harlan Ellison
- The Resurrection Man (1988), by Ian Watson
- Now and Again in Summer (1988), by Charles L. Grant
- Call 666 (1988), by Dennis Etchison
- The Great God Pan (1988), by M. John Harrison
- What Dreams May Come (1988), by Brad Strickland
- Regression (1988), by R. Chetwynd-Hayes
- Souvenirs from a Damnation (1988), by Don Webb
- Bleeding Between the Lines (1988), by Wayne Allen Sallee
- Playing the Game (1988), by Ramsey Campbell
- Lost Bodies (1988), by Ian Watson
- Ours Now (1988), by Nicholas Royle
- Prince of Flowers (1988), by Elizabeth Hand
- The Daily Chernobyl (1988), by Robert Frazier
- Snowman (1988), by Charles L. Grant
- Nobody’s Perfect (1988), by Thomas F. Monteleone
- Dead Air (1988), by Gregory Nicoll
- Recrudescence (1988), by Leonard Carpenter

18. The Year’s Best Horror Stories XVIII, editor Karl Edward Wagner, 1990.

- Kaddish (1989), by Jack Dann
- The Gravedigger's Tale (1989), by Simon Clark
- Meeting the Author (1989), by Ramsey Campbell
- Buckets (1989), by F. Paul Wilson
- The Pit-Yakker (1989), by Brian Lumley
- Mr. Sandman (1989), by Scott D. Yost
- Renaissance (1989), by Chico Kidd
- Lord of Infinite Diversions (1989), by T. Winter-Damon
- Rail Rider (1989), by Wayne Allen Sallee
- Archway (1989), by Nicholas Royle
- The Confessional (1989), by Patrick McLeod
- The Deliverer (1989), by Simon MacCulloch
- Reflections (1989), by Jeffrey Goddin
- Zombies for Jesus (1989), by Nina Kiriki Hoffman
- The Earth Wire (1989), by Joel Lane
- Sponge and China Tea (1989), by D. F. Lewis
- The Boy With the Bloodstained Mouth (1989), by W. H. Pugmire
- On the Dark Road (1989), by Ian McDowell
- Narcopolis (1989), by Wayne Allen Sallee
- Nights in the City (1989), by Jessica Amanda Salmonson
- Return to the Mutant Rain Forest (1989), by Bruce Boston and Robert Frazier
- The End of the Hunt (1989), by David Drake
- The Motivation (1989), by David Langford
- The Guide (1989), by Ramsey Campbell
- The Horse of Iron & How We Can Know It & Be Changed By It Forever (1989), by M. John Harrison
- Jerry's Kids Meet Wormboy (1989), by David J. Schow

19. The Year’s Best Horror Stories XIX, editor Karl Edward Wagner, 1991.

- Speed Demons (1990), by Andrew J. Wilson
- The Grief Condition (1990), by Conrad Hill
- Firebird (1990), by J. L. Comeau
- Life Sentences (1990), by Nina Kiriki Hoffman
- Trophies (1990), by Richard McMahan
- Lord of the Creepies (1990), by Sean Brodrick
- Mongrel (1990), by Steve Vernon
- The Man Who Collected Barker (1990), by Kim Newman
- Hide and Seek (1990), by D. F. Lewis
- Walking After Midnight (1990), by C. S. Fuqua
- The Hermit (1990), by Joey Froehlich
- The Soldier (1990), by Roger Johnson
- Books of Blurbs, Vol. 1 (1990), by Mike Newland
- You're a Sick Man, Mr. Antwhistle (1990), by Robert Hood
- Elfin Pipes of Northworld (1990), by David Drake
- A Bar Called Charley's (1990), by Charles Ardai
- Great Expectations (1990), by Kim Antieau
- Custer at the Wheel (1990), by James B. Hemesath
- Identity Crisis (1990), by Patrick McLeod
- Negatives (1990), by Nicholas Royle
- A Candle in the Sun (1990), by David Niall Wilson
- The Worst Fog of the Year (1990), by Ramsey Campbell
- I'll Give You Half-Scairt (1990), by Wayne Allen Sallee
- Different Kinds of Dead, (1990), by Ed Gorman
- Full Throttle (1990), by Philip Nutman

20. The Year’s Best Horror Stories XX, editor Karl Edward Wagner, 1992.

- Ma Qui (1991), by Alan Brennert
- The Same in Any Language (1991), by Ramsey Campbell
- Call Home (1991), by Dennis Etchison
- A Scent of Roses (1991), by Jeffrey Goddin
- Root Cellar (1991), by Nancy Kilpatrick
- An Eye for an Eye (1991), by Michael A. Arnzen
- The Picnickers (1991), by Brian Lumley
- With the Wound Still Wet (1991), by Wayne Allen Sallee
- My Giddy Aunt (1991), by D. F. Lewis
- The Lodestone (1991), by Sheila Hodgson
- Baseball Memories (1991), by Edo van Belkom
- The Bacchae (1991), by Elizabeth Hand
- Common Land (1991), by Joel Lane
- An Invasion of Angels (1987), by Nina Kiriki Hoffman
- The Sharps and Flats Guarantee (1991), by C. S. Fuqua
- Medusa's Child (1991), by Kim Antieau
- Wall of Masks (1991), by T. Winter-Damon
- Moving Out (1991), by Nicholas Royle
- Better Ways in a Wet Alley (1991), by Barb Hendee
- Close to the Earth (1991), by Gregory Nicoll
- Churches of Desire (1991), by Philip Nutman
- Carven of Onyx (1991), by Ron Weighell

21. The Year’s Best Horror Stories XXI, editor Karl Edward Wagner, 1993.

- The Limits of Fantasy (1992), by Ramsey Campbell
- China Rose (1992), by Ron Weighell
- The Outsider (1992), by Rick Kennett
- Briar Rose (1992), by Kim Antieau
- Mom SchooL (1992), by Rand Soellner
- The Hyacinth Girl (1992), by Mary Ann Mitchell
- Mind Games (1992), by Adam Meyer
- Mama's Boy (1992), by C. S. Fuqua
- The Shabbie People (1992), by Jeffrey Osier
- The Ugly File (1992), by Ed Gorman
- Eyes Like a Ghost's (1992), by Simon Clark
- Fallen Idol (1992), by Lillian Csernica
- And Some Are Missing (1992), by Joel Lane
- Welsh Pepper (1992), by D. F. Lewis
- Tracks (1992), by Nicholas Royle
- Largesse (1992), by Mark McLaughlin
- City in the Torrid Waste (1992), by T. Winter-Damon
- Haunting Me Softly (1992), by H. Andrew Lynch
- Spring Ahead, Fall Back (1992), by Michael A. Arnzen
- Apotheosis (1992), by Carrie Richerson
- Defining the Commonplace Sliver (1992), by Wayne Allen Sallee
- Feeding the Masses (1992), by Yvonne Navarro
- Sanctuary (1992), by Jeffrey Osier
- The Devil's Advocate (1991), by Andrew C. Ferguson
- Week Woman (1992), by Kim Newman
- A Father's Gift (1992), by W. M. Shockley

22. The Year’s Best Horror Stories XXII, editor Karl Edward Wagner, 1994.

- The Ripper’s Tune (1993), by Gregory Nicoll
- One Size Eats All (1993), by T.E.D. Klein
- Resurrection (1991), by Adam Meyer
- I Live to Wash Her (1993), by Joey Froehlich
- A Little-Known Side of Elvis (1993), by Dennis Etchison
- Perfect Days (1993), by Chet Williamson
- See How They Run (1993), by Ramsey Campbell
- Shots Downed, Officer Fired (1993), by Wayne Allen Sallee
- David (1993), by Sean Doolittle
- Portrait of a Pulp Writer (1993), by F. A. McMahan
- Fish Harbor (1993), by Paul Pinn
- Ridi Bobo (1993), by Robert Devereaux
- Adroitly Wrapped (1993), by Mark McLaughlin
- Thicker Than Water (1993), by Joel Lane
- Memento Mori (1993), by Scott Thomas
- The Blitz Spirit (1993), by Kim Newman
- Companions (1993), by Del Stone, Jr.
- Masquerade (1993), by Lillian Csernica
- Price of the Flames (1993), by Deidra Cox
- The Bone Garden (1993), by Conrad Williams
- Ice Cream and Tombstones (1993), by Nina Kiriki Hoffman
- Salt Snake (1993), by Simon Clark
- Lady’s Portrait, Executed in Archaic Colors (1993), by Charles M. Saplak
- Lost Alleys (1993), by Jeffrey Thomas
- Salustrade (1993), by D. F. Lewis
- The Power of One (1993), by Nancy Kilpatrick
- The Lions in the Desert (1993), by David Langford
- Turning Thirty (1993), by Lisa Tuttle
- Bloodletting (1993), by Kim Antieau
- Flying Into Naples (1993), by Nicholas Royle
- Under the Crust (1993), by Terry Lamsley
