= Esmé Wynne-Tyson =

English actress and writer

- Esmé Wynne-Tyson in 1916 with fellow actors, John Ekins (l.) and Noël Coward
- Born: Esmé Wynne; 29 June 1898; London, England
- Died: 17 January 1972 (aged 73); Chichester, England
- Occupations: Actress, writer and philosopher
- Spouse: Linden Charles Tyson (m. 1918; div. 1947)
- Children: Jon Wynne-Tyson

Esmé Wynne-Tyson (29 June 1898 – 17 January 1972) was an English actress, writer and philosopher. As a child she acted in West End plays, and became a close friend, confidante, and collaborator of Noël Coward. She left the stage in 1920 and wrote a series of novels. A growing interest in religious and moral matters led her into non-fiction and journalism, sometimes in partnership with the writer J. D. Beresford.

== Biography ==
=== Early years ===
Dorothy Estelle Esmé Innes Ripper was born in Stockwell, London, the only child of Harry Innes Ripper (1871–1956), a stockbroker, and Minnie Maude née Pitt (1874–1940). Educated first by governesses, then at an English boarding school and at a Belgian convent, she became a child-actress, taking the stage name Esmé Wynne in 1909.

She made her professional début in Maeterlinck's The Blue Bird and was the original Rosamund in Where the Rainbow Ends in 1911. While in the latter play, she became friendly with the young Noël Coward, who was in the production, and their friendship was for a time the most important in Coward's life. She began writing plays, sometimes alone and on other occasions in collaboration with Coward. Her first play, The Prince's Bride, was produced by Charles Hawtrey at the Savoy Theatre, London, when she was 13. Coward was in the cast. At the age of 19, she wrote a light comedy, Little Lovers, which was staged in London in 1922, drawing a dismissive review in The Times. With Coward, she wrote a series of short plays, under the joint pen-name "Esnomel": The Last Chapter (staged 1917), To Have and to Hold (not staged), and Women and Whisky (staged 1918). Her last stage appearance was as Faith in Coward's comedy I'll Leave It to You, in 1920, to which she contributed lyrics for a song.

=== Writing career ===
In 1918 Wynne married Linden Charles Tyson, an officer in the Royal Air Force. They combined their names as "Wynne-Tyson" the following year. There was one son of the marriage, Jon Wynne-Tyson, who became a writer and publisher. She became a convert to Christian Science and vegetarianism and was estranged from the worldly life of the theatre, though she remained friendly with Coward, who was amused at her attempts to improve his moral character. He teased her by professing "a selfless absorption in the well-being and achievement of Noël Coward" and an "unregenerate spiritual attitude".

In the years after her marriage, Wynne-Tyson wrote a series of novels: Security, 1927; Quicksand, 1927; Momus, 1928; Melody, 1929; and Incense and Sweet Cane, 1930. All five of these novels were to some extent autobiographical, reflecting the deterioration of her marriage and her increasing attachment to religion. Her husband left her in 1930, and they were divorced in 1947. After the separation, she turned to non-fiction and journalism as well as fiction, often in collaboration with John Davys Beresford, who shared her interest in metaphysics and in a mutual gospel she later named "philosophy of compassion". They wrote ten novels together, although some were issued under Beresford's name, for contractual reasons. Their official collaborations were Strange Rival, 1940; Men in the Same Boat, 1943; The Riddle of the Tower, 1944; and The Gift, 1947. Wynne-Tyson's non-fiction works include Prelude to Peace: The World-Brotherhood Educational Movement, 1936; The Unity of Being, 1949; This Is Life Eternal: The Case for Immortality, 1951; (under the pseudonym Peter de Morny) The Best Years of Their Lives, 1955; Mithras, the Fellow in the Cap, 1958; The Philosophy of Compassion: The Return of the Goddess, 1962; and (as editor) Porphyry's Abstinence from Animal Food, 1965.

Wynne-Tyson also wrote children's stories under the pen-name Amanda, and contributed philosophical articles, sometimes using the pen-name Diotima, to a wide range of publications including The Manchester Guardian and the Gandhian journal Gandhi Marg. From 1961 to 1970 she edited the magazine World Forum, which focused on vegetarianism and humanitarian matters.

=== Inspiration for stage characters ===
Wynne-Tyson was the inspiration for several stage characters. Some critics have seen elements of her in Madame Arcati, the eccentric spiritualist in Coward's Blithe Spirit, though the chief source of the character is thought to be another of Coward's friends, the writer Clemence Dane. However, Carlotta in Coward's late play A Song at Twilight was based on Wynne-Tyson after she had briefly come back into Coward's life in 1952, and Amanda's cries of "sollocks" in Private Lives to restore peace at times of quarrel have their origins in Wynne-Tyson's youthful rules of engagement with Coward. Her son Jon wrote a comedy, Marvellous Party, about a middle-age reunion of his mother and Coward.

Wynne-Tyson died in Chichester at the age of 73.

== See also ==
- List of vegetarians
