= Xélucha and Others =

1975 collection of stories by M. P. Shiel

- Dust-jacket illustration by Frank Utpatel.
- Author: M. P. Shiel
- Cover artist: Frank Utpatel
- Language: English
- Genre: Fantasy, horror
- Published: 1975 (Arkham House)
- Publication place: United States
- Media type: Print (hardback)
- Pages: viii, 143
- ISBN: 0-87054-069-6
- OCLC: 1365898
- Dewey Decimal: 823/.8
- LC Class: PZ3.S5553 Xe3 PR6037.H524

Xélucha and Others is a collection of stories by British writer M. P. Shiel. It was released in 1975 by Arkham House in an edition of 4,283 copies. It was the author's first book published by Arkham House and was first announced in Arkham's 1948 catalog. It contains the stories Shiel considered to be his best.

== Contents ==
Xélucha and Others contains the following tales:

- "Introduction"
- "Xélucha"
- "The Primate of the Rose"
- "Dark Lot of One Saul"
- "The House of Sounds"
- "The Globe of Gold-Fish"
- "Many a Tear"
- "The Bride"
- "The Tale of Henry and Rowena"
- "The Bell of St. Sepulcre"
- "Huguenin's Wife"
- "The Pale Ape"
- "The Case of Euphemia Raphash"

== Reception ==
Gahan Wilson reviewed the collection favorably, noting that even the lesser-known stories are "well worth your time" and singling out the title story as "an excellent example of Shiel's knack for decadence and is highly informative regarding the dietary preferences of graveyard worms."

== Sources ==
- Jaffery, Sheldon (1989). The Arkham House Companion. Mercer Island, WA: Starmont House, Inc. p. 114. ISBN 1-55742-005-X.
- Chalker, Jack L.; Mark Owings (1998). The Science-Fantasy Publishers: A Bibliographic History, 1923-1998. Westminster, MD and Baltimore: Mirage Press, Ltd. p. 51.
- Joshi, S.T. (1999). Sixty Years of Arkham House: A History and Bibliography. Sauk City, WI: Arkham House. pp. 137–138. ISBN 0-87054-176-5.
- Nielsen, Leon (2004). Arkham House Books: A Collector's Guide. Jefferson, NC and London: McFarland & Company, Inc. p. 121. ISBN 0-7864-1785-4.
