= Prince Zaleski and Cummings King Monk =

- Dust-jacket illustration by Joe Wehrle, Jr. for the first US edition of Prince Zaleski and Cummings King Monk
- Author: M. P. Shiel
- Illustrator: frontispiece by Bob Arrington
- Cover artist: Joe Wehrle, Jr.
- Language: English
- Genre: Supernatural fiction, Detective fiction short stories
- Publisher: Mycroft & Moran
- Publication date: 1977
- Publication place: United States
- Media type: Print (hardback)
- Pages: 220 pp
- ISBN: 0-87054-007-6
- OCLC: 3169342
- Dewey Decimal: 823/.8
- LC Class: PZ3.S5553 Ps5 PR6037.H524

Prince Zaleski and Cummings King Monk is a collection of supernatural detective short stories by the author M. P. Shiel. It was released in 1977 by Mycroft & Moran in an edition of 4036 copies. The first three Prince Zaleski stories had appeared in Shiel's first published work, Prince Zaleski (London: John Lane; Boston: Roberts Brothers, 1895). The fourth was first published in Ellery Queen's Mystery Magazine for January, 1955. The Cummings King Monk stories were drawn from The Pale Ape and Other Pulses (1911).

== Contents ==
Prince Zaleski and Cummings King Monk contains the following tales:

1. Prince Zaleski
  - "The Race of Orven"
  - "The Stone of the Edmundsbury Monks"
  - "The S.S."
  - "The Return of Prince Zaleski"
2. Cummings King Monk
  - "He Meddles With Women"
  - "He Defines 'Greatness of Mind'"
  - "He Wakes an Echo"
