= To Arkham and the Stars =

Short story by Fritz Leiber

"To Arkham and the Stars" is a short story by American writer Fritz Leiber that belongs to the Cthulhu Mythos genre of horror fiction. It was written for the 1966 Arkham House anthology The Dark Brotherhood and Other Pieces. Set in H. P. Lovecraft's Arkham and Miskatonic University, it includes characters from and allusions to several Lovecraft stories.

Robert M. Price, who included the story in his 1992 anthology Tales of the Lovecraft Mythos, said it "has proven to be a seminal Mythos tale, as in it we first see the depiction of Miskatonic University as having, as it were, a Mythos Studies Department." Price traces the influence of Leiber's story on such works as Philip José Farmer's "The Freshman", Lin Carter's "Zoth-Ommog" and Brian Lumley's The Burrowers Beneath and The Transition of Titus Crow.

== Synopsis ==
The story's unnamed narrator arrives at Arkham to visit Miskatonic University, noting changes that occurred there since the 1920s and 1930s. (The story is apparently set in the mid-1960s; references to Fidel Castro and the International Geophysical Year—1957-58—place it no earlier than the late 1950s.) He is met by Albert Wilmarth, the narrator of Lovecraft's "The Whisperer in Darkness", now the chair of Miskatonic's Literature Department.
