= The Purple Cloud =

1901 science fiction novel by M. P. Shiel

- Title illustration by J. J. Cameron
- Author: M. P. Shiel
- Illustrator: J. J. Cameron
- Language: English
- Genre: Science fiction
- Publisher: Chatto and Windus and others
- Publication date: 1901
- Publication place: United Kingdom
- Media type: Print (hardback and paperback)
- Pages: 463

The Purple Cloud is an apocalyptic "last man" novel by the British writer M. P. Shiel. It was published in 1901. H. G. Wells lauded The Purple Cloud as "brilliant", and H. P. Lovecraft later praised the novel as exemplary weird fiction, "delivered with a skill and artistry falling little short of actual majesty."

The story is about Adam Jeffson, a man on a polar expedition who discovers a mysterious and deathly Purple Cloud. In the wake of the massive global deaths wrought by the Purple Cloud, Jeffson becomes ruler of the world and builds a huge palace to his glory. He meets a young woman and the two become the heirs to the future of humanity.

The novel formed the basis for the 1959 American film The World, the Flesh and the Devil.

== Textual variations ==
The novel exists in three distinct texts. It was first published as a serial, with illustrations by J. J. Cameron, in The Royal Magazine, Vol V, #27-#30, Vol VI, #31–32, January – June 1901. This is the shortest version, and was photo-offset in Volume I of A. Reynolds Morse's monumental series, The Works of M. P. Shiel (1979–1983).

The original book text was published in London by Chatto & Windus in September 1901. This is the longest version, and is considered by many to be the preferred text. The 1901 text was reprinted in London by Tartarus Press in 2004 in an elaborate edition with all the Cameron illustrations from the serial and a new Introduction by Brian Stableford. Hippocampus Press included the 1901 text, but without the illustrations, in an omnibus volume, The House of Sounds and Others, edited by S. T. Joshi (2005). The 1901 text was also used in the edition published in 2012 in the Penguin Classics series with a new introduction by John Sutherland.

Shiel revised the novel in the 1920s, by tightening the language, rather than changing the plot. This version was first published in London by Victor Gollancz Ltd. (1929), and in New York by Vanguard Press (1930). This, the final version, was the text most commonly reprinted in numerous subsequent editions. The novel has also been published in French, Italian, German and Spanish.

== Plot ==
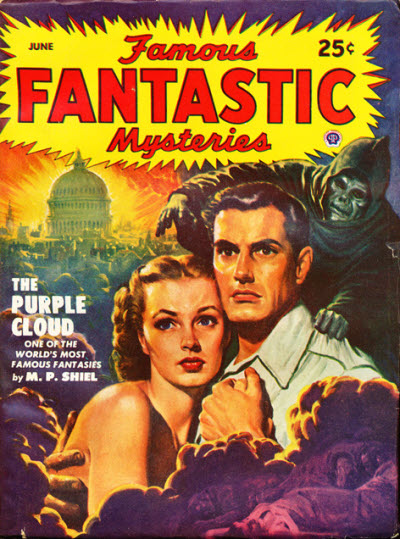
The Purple Cloud was reprinted in the June 1949 issue of Famous Fantastic Mysteries

The story, a recording of a medium's meditation over the future writing of the text, details the narrator, Adam Jeffson, on an expedition to the North Pole during the 20th century on board the Boreal. Jeffson's fiancée, the Countess Clodagh, poisons her own cousin to secure a place on the ship for Jeffson, because the expedition was known to be one of the best ever planned. A millionaire, who died some years previously, had provided in his will for the payment of millions of dollars to the first person to reach the Pole.

Before Jeffson leaves, he hears a priest speaking against polar research, calling the failure of all previous expeditions the will of God, and prophesying a terrible fate for those who attempt to go against God's will. Jeffson remembers meeting with a man who claimed that the universe is a place of strife between vague "powers", "The White" and "The Black", which vie for dominance.

Throughout the polar journey, Jeffson discovers that his course has been guided by these mysterious forces. He finds a huge lake of spinning water, with a rocky island inlaid with inscriptions. Upon seeing this, Jeffson faints. When he returns to his camp he feels nauseated after having smelled a peculiar peach-like odour. He also notices a moving purple cloud, spreading in the heavens. During the journey, he discovers dead animals, all without injury, and he learns of the death of his crew.

The ship being fairly easy to operate, he sets out by himself. First, he travels towards northern islands, but upon seeing the death of all various races from around the Earth there (the result of an exodus, escaping the death-bringing cloud), and meeting ships crowded with corpses, he comes instead to the dead continent, walking through London, searching for news of the cloud. He looks for any survivors, but finds all barricades broken through by mad crowds. Later, he goes to the house of Arthur Machen (a close friend of Shiel's), whom he finds dead, having been writing a poem until the very end. There, he finds the notebook into which he writes his whole narrative.

The later parts of the book describe Jeffson's descent into mad pompousness: adopting Turkish attire, he declares himself monarch and burns down cities (including Paris, Bordeaux, London, and San Francisco) for pleasure. He then commits his life to one task, the construction of a huge and colossal golden palace on the isle of Imbros, which he means to dedicate as an altar to God and a palace to himself. He spends seventeen years on the palace, several times abandoning the work, until its completion, when he recognises the vanity of it.

While travelling through Constantinople, which he also burns down, he meets a twenty-year-old naked woman who is without the slightest knowledge of anything in the world. She continues to follow him, no matter how he mistreats her. Gradually, he accepts her, but forces her to wear a veil over her mouth. Her speed at learning astonishes him, so he teaches her to speak, read, cook, fish, and dress. The girl (who is unable to pronounce "r", instead saying "l") reveals that she had lived her whole life in a cellar below the royal palace of Turkey, and that she knew nothing of the world until she was freed when Jeffson burned down Constantinople. She becomes absorbed in the Bible and declares the humans who sought for riches as "spoiled".

Jeffson struggles mightily against his growing affection towards the girl, wishing to end the human race. At the end, when he leaves to go to England, she telephones him about the re-appearance of the Purple Cloud over France. He rushes to her, embracing her as his wife and now hoping to find a way to escape the cloud. She tells him to trust that God will not allow her to die. He concludes his writing by saying that he has accepted his role and that after three weeks have passed no purple cloud has appeared, and he looks forward to the two of them becoming the progenitors of future humanity.
