= Jon Wynne-Tyson =

English author and publisher (1924–2020)

- Wynne-Tyson in 1986
- Born: Jon Linden Wynne-Tyson; 6 July 1924; Hampshire, England
- Died: 26 March 2020 (aged 95); West Sussex, England
- Education: Brighton College
- Occupations: Activist; publisher; writer
- Spouses: Joan Stanton (m. 1950, divorced) Jennifer Tyson (m. 1956)
- Children: 2
- Mother: Esmé Wynne-Tyson

Jon Linden Wynne-Tyson (6 July 1924 – 26 March 2020) was an English author, publisher, Quaker, activist and pacifist, who founded Centaur Press in 1954. He ran Centaur Press from his home in Sussex and was a distinguished independent publisher. He wrote books on animal rights and vegetarianism. At one time Wynne-Tyson held the title of "King of Redonda", a literary title referencing a small island.

== Life and writings ==
Jon Linden Wynne-Tyson was born in Hampshire, England, on 6 July 1924. His mother was Esmé Wynne-Tyson, a former child actress and writer, and his father was Linden Charles Tyson, an officer in the Royal Air Force. He attended Brighton College but left at age 15, when his father could not longer afford the school fees after rejoining the RAF, on the outbreak of World War II. Wynne-Tyson was registered as a conscientious objector so did not fight in the war, instead working as a market gardener with other pacifists and Quakers.

In 1950 Wynne-Tyson married Joan Stanton and they had a daughter. In 1956, after their divorce, he married Jennifer Tyson (no relation); they also had a daughter.

In 1985 he received the Animal Rights Writing Award from the International Society for Animal Rights. His work The Extended Circle was endorsed by animal rights philosophers Tom Regan and Peter Singer.

In 1989 Wynne-Tyson published the play Marvellous Party about his mother and a visit from her close friend Noël Coward. He later adapted it into a radio play, which was broadcast on the BBC world service in May 1994.

His last book was an autobiography entitled Finding the Words: A Publishing Life, which focused on his life in publishing. His autobiography also details the friendship between his mother and Noël Coward.

In 2016 he became a patron of Quaker Concern for Animals.

Wynne-Tyson died on 26 March 2020 at the age of 95.

== Centaur Press ==
Founded in 1954, Centaur Press was a full-time independent publishing company until it was sold to another small publisher, in 1998. The output from Centaur Press ranged from small stories illustrated by his first wife Joan Stanton, to the substantial hardback series Centaur Classics, which included such titles as Leland's five-volume Itinerary in England and Wales, Tyndale's translation of the Pentateuch, and Burns' Commonplace Book. The company expanded into humane education, under the imprint, Kinship Library, releasing titles on topics such as vegetarianism, animal rights, and related philosophy. The firm also published works of fiction (So Say Banana Bird), classical literature and philosophy (The Myths of Plato) and poetry.

== Vegetarianism ==
Wynne-Tyson was the author of the book Food for a Future: The Ecological Priority of a Humane Diet, first published in 1975. It was republished as Food for a Future: The Complete Case For Vegetarianism in 1979. The book argues from anatomy, physiology and pathology that humans are naturally vegetarian and provides ecological necessities for giving up eating and slaughtering animals.

Reviewing the book in the New Scientist magazine, science writer Colin Tudge commented that the "man-is-a-vegetarian thesis is ecological unnecessary, and biology unsound", but that vegetarians do have worthwhile things to say. The book was negatively reviewed in the Medical History journal.

Wynne-Tyson's book Food for a Future has a chapter "The Further Step", which is supportive of veganism but he never became vegan.

== See also ==
- List of animal rights advocates

== Selected publications ==
- Accommodation Wanted (Britannicvs Liber: 1951)
- Civilized Alternative: Pattern for Protest (Centaur Press: 1972) ISBN 978-0900000805
- Food for a Future: The Ecological Priority of a Humane Diet (HarperCollins: 1975) ISBN 978-0706701425
- Food for a Future: The Complete Case For Vegetarianism (Centaur Press: 1979) ISBN 978-0900000973
- So Say Banana Bird (Pythian: 1984) ISBN 978-0946849000
- The Extended Circle: A Dictionary of Humane Thought (Centaur Press: 1985, 2009 revised and expanded ed.) ISBN 978-0900001215
- Food for a Future: How World Hunger Could be Ended by the Twenty-first Century (Thorsons: 1988) ISBN 978-0722514405
- Marvellous Party (Open Gate Press: 1989) ISBN 978-0714541785
- Publishing Your Own Book (Centaur Press: 1989) ISBN 978-0900001284
- Anything Within Reason (Oakroyd Press: 1994) ISBN 978-0951221013
- Finding the Words: A Publishing Life (Michael Russell Publishing Ltd.: 2004) ISBN 978-0859552875
