= Louis Tracy =

British journalist and writer (1863–1928)

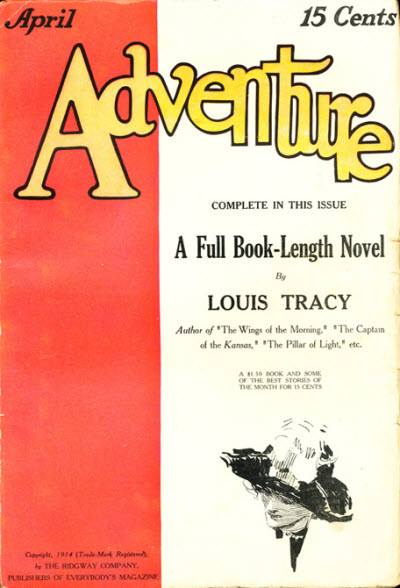
Tracy's novel Sylvia's Search was cover-featured on the April 1914 issue of Adventure

Louis Tracy (18 March 1863 – 13 August 1928) (born Patrick Joseph Treacy) was a British journalist, and prolific writer of fiction. He used the pseudonyms Gordon Holmes and Robert Fraser, which were at times shared with the writer M. P. Shiel, with whom he collaborated until 1911.

His fiction included mystery, adventure and romance.

== Life ==
He was born in Liverpool to a well-to-do middle-class family. At first he was educated at home and then at the French Seminary at Douai. Around 1884 he became a reporter for a local paper, The Northern Echo at Darlington, circulating in parts of Durham and North Yorkshire; later he worked for papers in Cardiff and Allahabad. During 1892–1894, he was closely associated with Arthur Harmsworth, in The Sun and The Evening News and Post.

During WWI, he travelled to the United States and gave lectures on the war. After the war, he worked with the British Foreign Office and later for The Times newspaper.

== Published works ==
Tracy’s works include:

- The Final War: A Story of the Great Betrayed (London: C. Arthur Pearson, 1896)
- An American Emperor: The Story of the Fourth Empire of France (London: C. Arthur Pearson, 1897)
- The Lost Provinces: A Sequel to An American Emperor (London: C. Arthur Pearson, 1898)
- The Strange Disappearance of Lady Delia (London: C. Arthur Pearson, 1901)
- The Invaders: A Story of Britain Peril (London: C. Arthur Pearson, 1901)
- The Wooing of Esther Gray (London: C. Arthur Pearson, 1902)
- The Wings of the Morning (New York : Grosset & Dunlap, 1903)
- The Albert Gate Mystery (New York: R. F. Fenno, 1904)
- The King of Diamonds (New York : Grosset & Dunlap, 1904)
- The Sirdar's Sabre: Being for the most part the Adventures of Sirdar Bahadur Mohammed Khan (London: F.V. White and Co., Limited, 1905)
- The Wheel o’fortune (New York: E.J. Clode, 1907)
- Captain of the Kansas (Toronto: McLeod & Allen, 1907)
- One Wonderful Night: A Romance in New York (New York: E. J. Clode, 1912)
- Sylvia's Search (New York: G. Schirmer, 1914)
- Number Seventeen (1915)
- The Strange Case of Mortimer Fenley (1915)
- The Postmaster’s Daughter (New York: Grosset & Dunlap, 1916)
- The Bartlett Mystery (New York: E. J. Clode, 1919)
- Number Seventeen (New York: E. J. Clode, 1919)
- The House ‘round the Corner (New York: Grosset & Dunlap, 1919)
- The Wings of the Morning
- A Mysterious Disappearance
- His Unknown Wife
