= M. P. Shiel =

British writer (1865–1947)

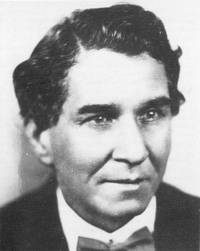
- Born: Matthew Phipps Shiell; 21 July 1865; Montserrat, British Leeward Islands
- Died: 17 February 1947 (aged 81)
- Citizenship: British
- Education: Harrison College, Barbados; King's College, London
- Spouses: Carolina "Lina" Garcia-Gómez; Esther Lydia Jewson (née Furley)
- Children: Dolores Katherine "Lola" Shiell (by 1st marriage); Ada Phipps Seward (illegitimate); Caesar Kenneth Price/Shiel (illegitimate)
- Relatives: Priscilla Ann Blake; Matthew Dowdy Shiell

Matthew Phipps Shiell (21 July 1865 – 17 February 1947), known as M. P. Shiel, was a British writer, remembered mainly for supernatural horror and scientific romances. His work was published as serials, novels, and as short stories. The Purple Cloud (1901, revised 1929) remains his most often reprinted novel.

== Biography ==
=== Caribbean background ===
Matthew Phipps Shiell was born on the island of Montserrat in the West Indies. His mother was Priscilla Ann Blake; his father was Matthew Dowdy Shiell, most probably the illegitimate child of an Irish Customs officer and a female slave. Shiell was educated at Harrison College, Barbados.

=== Early years in the UK ===
Shiell moved to England in 1885, eventually adopting Shiel as his pen name. After working as a teacher and translator, a series of his short stories began to be published in The Strand Magazine and other periodicals. His early literary reputation was based on two collections of short stories influenced by Poe published in the Keynote series by John Lane – Prince Zaleski (1895) and Shapes in the Fire (1896) – considered by some critics to be the most flamboyant works of the English decadent movement. His first novel was The Rajah's Sapphire (1896), based on a plot by William Thomas Stead, who probably hired Shiel to write the novel.

=== Serial publication ===
Shiel's popular reputation was made by another work for hire. This began as a serial contracted by Peter Keary (1865–1915), of C. Arthur Pearson Ltd, to capitalise on public interest in a crisis in China (which became known as the Scramble for Concessions).

The Empress of the Earth ran weekly in Short Stories from 5 February – 18 June 1898. The early chapters incorporated actual headline events as the crisis unfolded, and proved a success with the reading public. Pearson responded by ordering Shiel to double the length of the serial to 150,000 words, but Shiel cut it back by a third for the book version, which was rushed out that July as The Yellow Danger.

Some contemporary critics described this novel as a fictionalisation of Charles Henry Pearson's National Life and Character: A Forecast (1893). Shiel's Asian villain, Dr. Yen How, has been cited as a possible basis for Sax Rohmer's much better-known Dr. Fu Manchu. Dr. Yen How was probably based on the Chinese revolutionary Sun Yat-sen (1866–1925), who had first gained fame in England in 1896 when he was kidnapped and imprisoned at the Chinese embassy in London until public outrage pressured the British government to demand his release. Similar kidnapping incidents occurred in several of Shiel's subsequent novels. The Yellow Danger was Shiel's most successful book during his lifetime. Shiel himself considered the novel hackwork, and seemed embarrassed by its success. It was a likely influence on H. G. Wells in The War in the Air (1908), Jack London in The Unparalleled Invasion (1910), and others.

Shiel's next novel was another serial contracted by Pearson to tie into the Spanish–American War. Contraband of War ran in Pearson's Weekly 7 May – 9 July 1898, again incorporating headline events into the serial as the war progressed. It was published as a book the following year.

=== Genre innovator ===
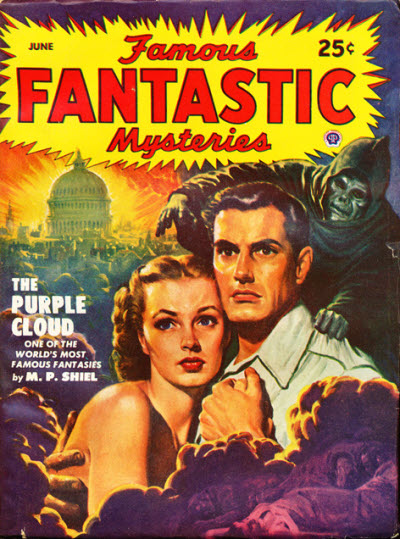
The Purple Cloud was reprinted in the June 1949 issue of Famous Fantastic Mysteries

Around 1899–1900, Shiel conceived a loosely linked trilogy of novels which were described by David G. Hartwell in his introduction to the Gregg Press edition of The Purple Cloud as possibly the first future history series in science fiction. Each was linked by similar introductory frame purporting to show that the novels were visions of progressively more distant (or alternative?) futures glimpsed by a clairvoyant in a trance. Notebook I of the series had been plotted at least by 1898, but would not see print until published as The Last Miracle (1906). Notebook II became The Lord of the Sea (1901), which was recognised by contemporary readers as a critique of private ownership of land based on the theories of Henry George.

Shiel's lasting literary reputation is largely based on Notebook III of the series which was serialised in The Royal Magazine in abridged form before book publication that autumn as The Purple Cloud (1901). The Purple Cloud is an important text of early British science fiction, a dystopian, post-apocalytic novel that tells the tale of Adam Jeffson, who, returning alone from an expedition to the North Pole, discovers that a worldwide catastrophe has left him as the last man alive. Demonstrative of the speculative, philosophical impulse that pervades Shiel's work, The Purple Cloud engages with Victorian developments in the sciences of geology and biology, tending to home in on their dark sides of geological cataclysm and racial decline in keeping with what has been termed the fin-de-siècle "apocalyptic imaginary", while ultimately putting forward a positive if unorthodox view of catastrophe.

Shiel had married a young Parisian-Spaniard, Carolina Garcia Gomez in 1898; she was the model for a character in Cold Steel (1900) and several short stories. (The Welsh author and mystic Arthur Machen and decadent poet Theodore Wratislaw were among the wedding guests.) They separated around 1903 and his daughter was taken to Spain after Lina's death around 1904. Shiel blamed the failure of the marriage on the interference of his mother-in-law, but money was at the heart of their problems. Shiel was caught between his desire to write high art and his need to produce more commercial fare. When his better efforts did not sell well, he was forced to seek more journalistic work, and began to collaborate with Louis Tracy on a series of romantic mystery novels, some published under Tracy's name, others under the pseudonyms Gordon Holmes and Robert Fraser. The last of their known collaborations appeared in 1911.

=== Edwardian times ===
In 1902, Shiel turned away from the more dramatic future war and science fiction themes which had dominated his early serial novels and began a series which have been described as his middle period romantic novels. The most interesting was the first, serialised as In Love's Whirlpool in Cassell's Saturday Journal, 14 May – 3 September 1902, and published in book form as The Weird o'It (1902). Shiel later described it as a "true Bible or Holy Book" for modern times, in which he had attempted to represent "Christianity in a radical way." This novel was far from hackwork, and besides apparent autobiographical elements (including a minor character based on Ernest Dowson with whom Shiel is rumoured to have roomed briefly in the 1890s), contains some of his finest writing, but it was not reprinted in England, nor formally published in America.

Shiel returned to contemporary themes in The Yellow Wave (1905), an historical novel about the Russo-Japanese War of 1904–1905. The novel was a recasting of Romeo and Juliet into the ongoing war with leading families of the two nations standing in for the feuding Capulets and Montagues of Shakespeare's play. Shiel modelled his hero on Yoshio Markino (1874–1956), the Japanese artist and author who lived in London from 1897–1942. In February 1904, Shiel had offered to Peter Keary to go to the front as a war correspondent with letters of introduction from Markino. He may have met Markino through Arthur Ransome who dedicated Bohemia in London (1907) to Shiel and used him as the model for the chapter on "The Novelist."

Faced with declining sales of his books, Shiel tried to recapture the success of The Yellow Danger when China and Sun Yat-sen returned to the headlines during the 1911 Revolution. Though a better novel in most respects, The Dragon (1913), serialised earlier that year as To Arms! and revised in 1929 as The Yellow Peril, failed to catch the public's interest. As the hero of the story had oddly predicted, Shiel turned away from novels for ten years.

=== 1914 conviction for child molestation ===
It was once popularly believed that Shiel had spent time in prison for fraud; however, it was discovered in 2008 that in 1914 Shiel had actually been convicted under the Criminal Law Amendment Act (1885) for "indecently assaulting and carnally knowing" his 12-year-old de facto stepdaughter. Unrepentant, Shiel served sixteen months hard labour in prison, complaining to the Home Secretary about the law, though he assured his publisher Grant Richards in a letter that he had been treated well. Shiel's discussion of his crime is disingenuous; he conceals from Richards the identity of his victim in addition to misleading him about her age, and instead refers to "love-toyings" with an older girl on the cusp of maturity. Nor does Shiel mention that he had known both the girl and her mother's sisters long before his conviction, perhaps intimately, as contemporary letters from one of the sisters to Shiel suggest. Court records described Shiel as a "clerk and metal worker"; one of the witnesses was a metal worker and the records may have transposed some information. He appealed the conviction unsuccessfully.

The case was reported in The Vote, a weekly women's suffrage newspaper, on 4 December 1914 in its Protected Sex section. The article states that Shiel (misspelled as Sheil) denied the whole story and that the "case was remarkable for the philosophical discussions on sex" by Shiel who conducted his own defence. Shiel was described as having a "purient mind" [sic] by the presiding Judge, Mr Justice Coleridge. The article was rediscovered in 2019, 11 years after MacLeod's initial discovery.

It is too early to assess whether this new revelation about Shiel will have an impact upon his literary legacy. However, as Macleod argues in her essay, young heroines abound in Shiel's novels, where they are romanticised, idealised and sexualised through the eyes of the male author. She cites the example of the two-thousand-year-old Rachel in This Above All (1933), who is portrayed as part "child," part "harlot," part "saint", since she still inhabits the young girl's body she possessed when raised from the dead and thus rendered immortal by the Biblical Christ. Lazarus (also a 2,000-year-old immortal for the same reason) is warned ruefully against her: “If Rachel and you co-habit without some marriage-rite, you may see yourself in prison here in Europe, since it cannot be believed that she is as old as fourteen.”

=== Georgian times ===
Over the next decade Shiel wrote five plays, dabbled in radical politics and translated at least one, though probably more, pamphlets for the Workers Socialist Federation. In 1919, he married his second wife, Esther Lydia Jewson (née Furley) (August 16, 1872 – February 16, 1942). Esther Lydia's first husband was William Arthur Jewson (July 12, 1856 - April 26, 1914), a prominent musician who had been born in London and died of a heart attack. Shiel and Esther travelled in Italy in the early 1920s, probably living largely off her income, and separated around 1929, but did not divorce. The separation was precipitated by Shiel's sexual interest in and possible abuse of Esther Lydia's young female relatives. Shiel then lived at Harold's Cross, close to Esther Lydia's house, 'The Kiln' at Wisborough Green, West Sussex.

He returned to writing around 1922 and between 1923 and 1937 published a further ten or so books, as well as thorough revisions of five of his earlier novels. Shiel spent most of his last decade working on a "truer" translation of the Gospel of Luke with extensive commentary. He finished it, but half of the final draft was lost after his death in Chichester.

In 1931, Shiel met a young poet and bibliophile, John Gawsworth, who befriended him and helped him obtain a Civil List pension. Gawsworth talked Shiel into allowing him to complete several old story fragments, sometimes roping literary friends like Oswell Blakeston into helping. The results were largely unsuccessful, but Gawsworth used them as filler in various anthologies with his name prominently listed as co-author.

=== Redonda: the legend of the kingdom ===
As King Felipe, Shiel was purportedly the king of Redonda, a small uninhabited rocky island in the West Indies, situated a short distance northwest of the island of Montserrat, where Shiel was born.

The Redonda legend was probably created out of his imagination by Shiel himself and was first mentioned publicly in a 1929 booklet advertising the reissue of four of his novels by Victor Gollancz Ltd. According to the story Shiel told, he was crowned King of Redonda on his 15th birthday in 1880. However, there is little evidence that Shiel took these claims seriously. His biographer, Harold Billings, speculates that the story may have been an intentional hoax foisted on the gullible press. At this late date, verifying or discrediting the story may be impossible.

On his death, John Gawsworth became both his literary executor and his appointed heir to the "kingdom". Gawsworth took the legend of Redonda to heart. He never lost an opportunity to further elaborate the tale and spread the story to the press. Gawsworth supposedly kept the ashes of Shiel "in a biscuit tin on the mantelpiece, putting a pinch in the stew for special guests."

== Legacy ==
Excluding the collaborations with Tracy, Shiel published more than 30 books, including 25 novels and various collections of short stories, essays and poems. Arkham House issued two posthumous collections, Xelucha and Others (1975) and Prince Zaleski and Cummings King Monk (1977). The Purple Cloud remains his best known and most reprinted novel. It has been variously described as both a neglected masterpiece and the best of all Last Man novels. It was credited as the loose inspiration for the film, The World, the Flesh and the Devil (1959), starring Harry Belafonte, Inger Stevens, and Mel Ferrer. Stephen King cited it as an influence on his novel The Stand.

Some of the short stories continue to be reprinted, but many of his other novels, including the middle period romantics, have been nearly forgotten. As of 1 January 2018, all of the works published during Shiel's lifetime have entered the public domain in the United Kingdom and all other countries with a copyright term of Life of the Author plus 70 years.

== Bibliography ==
=== Novels ===
- The Rajah's Sapphire (1896), with uncredited W. T. Stead
- An American Emperor: The Story of the Fourth Estate of France (1897), uncredited, with Louis Tracy
- The Yellow Danger (1898); full title The Yellow Danger; Or, what Might Happen in the Division of the Chinese Empire Should Estrange All European Countries, serialised 1898 as The Empress of the Earth: The Tale of the Yellow War; issued in the U.S. 1898 as China in Arms, 1899 revised as The Yellow Danger: The Story of the World's Greatest War
- Contraband of War (1899)
- Cold Steel (1899, revised 1929)
- The Man-Stealers (1900)
- The Lord of the Sea (1901, revised 1924), plotted as Notebook II
- The Purple Cloud (1901, revised 1929), serialised 1901 as Notebook III
- The Weird o' It (1902), serialised 1902 as In Love's Whirlpool
- Unto the Third Generation (1903)
- The Evil That Men Do (1904)
- The Lost Viol (1905)
- The Yellow Wave (1905) – non-fantastic, based on the contemporary Russo-Japanese War
- The Last Miracle (1906, revised 1929), plotted by 1898 as Notebook I
- The White Wedding (1908)
- The Isle of Lies (1909)
- This Knot of Life (1909)
- The Dragon (1913), serialised 1913 as To Arms!, revised as The Yellow Peril (1929) – another Yellow Peril fiction
- Children of the Wind (1923)
- How the Old Woman Got Home (1927)
- Dr. Krasinski's Secret (1929)
- The Black Box (1930)
- Say Au R'Voir But Not Goodbye (1933)
- This Above All (1933), reissued as Above All Else (1943)
- The Young Men Are Coming! (1937)
- The New King (1981), alternately entitled The Splendid Devil, written c. 1934–45

=== Short story collections ===
- Prince Zaleski (1895)
  - "The Race of Orven", "The Stone of the Edmundsbury Monks", "The S.S."
- Shapes in the Fire: Being a Mid-Winter's Nights Entertainment in Two Parts and an Interlude (1896)
  - "Xélucha", "Maria in the Rose-Bush", "Vaila", "Premier and Maker (An Essay)", "Tulsah", "The Serpent Ship" (poem), "Phorfor"
- The Pale Ape and Other Pulses (1911)
  - "The Pale Ape", "The Case of Euphemia Raphash", the three-part "Cummings King Monk", "A Bundle of Letters", "Huguenin's Wife", "Many a Tear", "The House of Sounds" (revision of "Vaila"), "The Spectre Ship", "The Great King", "The Bride"
- Here Comes the Lady (1928)
  - "The Tale of Hugh and Agatha", "The Tale of Henry and Rowena", "The Tale of Gaston and Mathilde", "No. 16 Brook Street", "The Tale of One in Two", "The Tale of Charley and Barbara", "The Bell of St. Sépulcre", "The Primate of the Rose", "The Corner in Cotton", "Dark Lot of One Saul", "The Tale of Adam and Hannah"
- The Invisible Voices (1935)
  - "The Panel Day", "The Adore Day", "The Rock Day (The Vulture's Rock)", "The Diary Day", "The Cat Day", "The Lion Day", "The Place of Pain Day", "The Vengeance Day", "The Venetian Day", "The Future Day", "The Goat Day"
- The Best Short Stories of M. P. Shiel (1948)
  - "The Race of Orven", "The Stone of the Edmundsbury Monks", "The S.S.", "Xélucha", "Vaila", "Tulsah", "Phorfor", "Huguenin's Wife", "Monk Wakes an Echo", "The Bride", "Dark Lot of One Saul", "The Primate of the Rose"
- Xelucha and Others (1975)
- Prince Zaleski and Cummings King Monk (1977)
- The Empress of the Earth; The Purple Could; and Some Short Stories (1979)
  - The Works of M. P. Shiel Vol. I, Writings – offprints of the original periodical editions, with period illustrations; The Empress of the Earth was the original serial version of The Yellow Danger; stories from 1893–1911: "Guy Harkaway's Substitute", "The Eagle's Crag", "A Puzzling Case", "Huguenin's Wife", "The Case of Euphemia Raphash", "Wayward Love", "The Spectre Ship", "The Secret Panel", "A Night in Venice", "The Battle of Waterloo", "Ben", "The Bride", "Many a Tear", "Miche", "A Good Thing"
- Xélucha and The Primate of the Rose (1994)
  - Xélucha, The Primate of the Rose
- The House of Sounds and Others (2005)
  - "Xélucha", "The Pale Ape", "The Case of Euphemia Raphash", "Huguenin's Wife", "The House of Sounds", "The Great King", "The Bride", "The Purple Cloud", "Vaila"

=== Short stories ===
- "The Race of Orven" (1895)
- "The S.S." (1895)
- "The Stone of the Edmundsbury Monks" (1895)
- "Xélucha" (1896)
- "Vaila" (1896)
- "Huguenin's Wife" (1895)
- "A Shot at the Sun" (1903)
- "The Case of Euphemia Raphash" (1911)
- "The Pale Ape" (1911)
- "The House of Sounds" (1911)
- "The Great King" (1911)
- "The Bride (short story)|The Bride" (1911)
- "The Place of Pain" (1914)
- "The Primate of the Rose" (1928))
- "The Flying Cat" (1932)
- "A Night in Venice" (1932)
- "Dark Lot of One Saul" (1933)
- "The Globe of Gold-Fish" (1934)
- "How Life Climbs" (1934)
- "The Purchester Instrument" (1935)
- "The Death Dance" (1935)
- "At the Eleventh House" (1935)
- "The 'Master'" (1936)
- "Dr. Todor Karadji" (1936)
- "The Mystery of The Red Road" (1936)
- "The Hanging of Ernest Clark (1936)

=== Miscellaneous works ===
- Richard's Shilling Selections from Edwardian Poets – M. P. Shiel (1936)
- Science, Life and Literature (1950), essays, with a Foreword by John Gawsworth

== See also ==
- Apocalyptic and post-apocalyptic fiction
- Kingdom of Redonda
- Yellow Peril
- A. Reynolds Morse & Eleanor R. Morse
