= Reynolds and Eleanor Morse =

American philanthropists

Albert Reynolds Morse (October 20, 1914 – August 15, 2000) was an American businessman and philanthropist. His wife, Eleanor Reese Morse (October 21, 1912 – July 1, 2010) was also an American philanthropist. They founded the Salvador Dalí Museum in St. Petersburg, Florida.

== Early life and education ==
Reynolds Morse was born in Denver, Colorado to Bradish P. and Anna Morse. His father ran the specialist mining and machinery concern, Morse Brothers Machinery Company. His mother was the daughter of pioneer Albert Eugene Reynolds.

Reynolds Morse graduated Phi Beta Kappa from the University of Colorado Boulder. He then took an Master of Business Administration at the Harvard Business School. For a decade after his MBA, Reynolds worked in industry before starting his own firm, Injection Molders Supply Company in 1949.

Reese Morse was the daughter of Cleveland pharmaceuticals manufacturer George Reese. After graduating from the Hathaway Brown School, she earned a bachelor's degree in music from Rollins College in Winter Park, Florida in 1937. She was initiated into the Florida Gamma chapter of Pi Beta Phi chapter at Rollins College.

== Occupational life ==
Reynolds Morse had many business, writing and collecting interests in addition to the collection of Salvador Dalí's paintings which he and Reese Morse built up and to running Injection Molders Supply Company. For instance, he published "Injection Molding News"; added to the rock collection of the Denver Natural History Museum where he was a trustee, and he collected George Elbert Burr manuscript materials which he donated to the Denver Public Library.

Reynolds Morse also authored George Elbert Burr: Etcher of the American West and published an anthology of his own, which he called Some Fifty Unprofessional Poems, as well as Gold Links Tailings in memory of his maternal grandfather. Reynolds Morse collected and wrote about the works of M. P. Shiel. Reynolds' The Works of M. P. Shiel was published in 1948; he later turned this work into a four-tome set and added The Quest for Redonda and The New King. In 1989 Reynolds donated his Shiel collection to Olin Library at Rollins College.

The Morses' art collecting and friendship with Gala and Salvador Dalí produced a valuable art collection that is now housed in the Salvador Dalí Museum in St. Petersburg, Florida.

The year of their marriage the Morses began their long friendship with Dalí and on March 21, 1943, acquired their first Dalí work, Daddy Longlegs of the Evening - Hope!; early in April 1943 they acquired The Archaeological Reminiscence of Millet's "Angelus". Over time, becoming patrons of Dalí, the Morses acquired works by Dalí which they found both captivating and intriguing. Their absorption by the artist's work led Reynolds to author numerous studies of Dalí and his œuvre and Eleanor to translate from French to English numerous books about Dalí and his œuvre. In 1969, the Morses purchased The Hallucinogenic Toreador, before it was completed.

From 1971 to 1980, the Morses' considerable Dalí collection was on show in Beachwood, Ohio at the Salvador Dalí Museum, which was established there in a wing of their business premises. During that time the collection grew and required larger accommodation.

The Morses began the search for a new, permanent home for their collection. After seeing an article in the Wall Street Journal, "U.S. Art World Dillydallies over Dalí", St. Petersburg attorney James W. Martin persuaded local leaders to approach the Morses to choose St. Petersburg. With the financial support of the City of St. Petersburg and the State of Florida, the collection was housed in the Salvador Dalí Museum, formerly a warehouse on the waterfront, which opened in March 1982. A new, larger and more storm-secure museum near the current one, opened in 1-11-11 (at 11:11 am).

"Sharing their knowledge and understanding of Salvador Dalí and his art has been a lifelong mission for this dedicated couple."

== Personal life ==
The Morses married in 1943. They had one son, Brad.

Reynolds Morse died on August 15, 2000, in Seminole, Florida, after a long illness. He was 85.

Reese Morse died on July 1, 2010, in St. Petersburg, Florida, of natural causes. She was 97.
