= Reserva Natural Punta Cucharas =

Nature reserve in Ponce, Puerto Rico

- Punta Cucharas Nature Reserve
- IUCN category V (protected landscape/seascape)
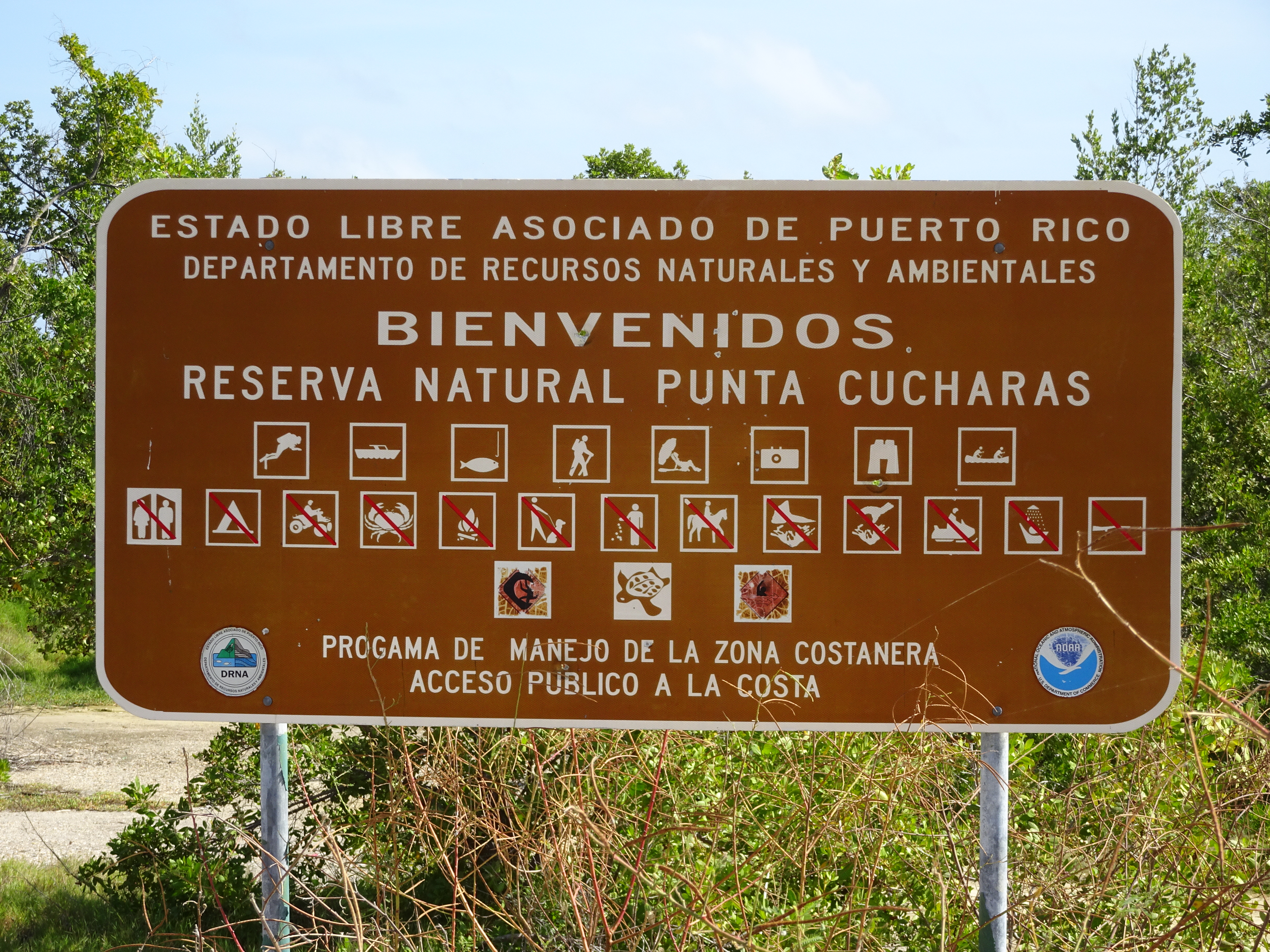
- Sign at the entrance to Reserva Natural Punta Cucharas

- Location within Puerto Rico
- Location: Barrio Canas, Ponce, Puerto Rico
- Nearest city: Ponce
- Coordinates: PR 17°58′00″N 66°40′23″W
- Area: Total (Land): 698 cuerdas (678 acres) (Note: One cuerda is equal to 0.971 acre.); Total (Marine): 3,516 cuerdas (3,415 acres); Las Salinas Lagoon only: 347,898 m^{2} (86 acres)
- Designation: 2008
- Governing body: Puerto Rico Department of Natural and Environmental Resources

Fauna and Flora at Reserva Natural Punta Cucharas
- Interactive map of Fauna and Flora at Reserva Natural Punta Cucharas
- Location: Ponce, Ponce, Puerto Rico
- Established: 2008
- Named for: Coastal geographical formation
- Governing body: Puerto Rico Department of Natural and Environmental Resources
- Website: Puerto Rico Department of Natural and Environmental Resources

Reserva Natural Punta Cucharas (Punta Cucharas Nature Reserve) is a nature reserve in Barrio Canas, Ponce, Puerto Rico. It consists of both a land area component as well as an offshore marine area. The land component has an area of 698 cuerdas (678 acres) while the marine component has an expanse of 3,516 cuerdas (3,415 acres), for a total area of 4,214 cuerdas (4,093 acres). The Reserve consists of mangrove ecosystems, coastal sand dunes, a saline lagoon known as Laguna Las Salinas, open water, and a century-old local community. The lagoon occupies and area of 347,898 m^{2} (86 acres) Ecological protection is managed and enforced by the Puerto Rico Department of Natural and Environmental Resources. Eight activities are allowed at the Reserve: scuba diving, boating, fishing, hiking, sun bathing, photography, bird watching and canoeing. Activities prohibited are camping, crabbing/trapping, horseback riding, water crafting, and hunting. Pets, ATVs, and fireplaces are also prohibited.

== History ==
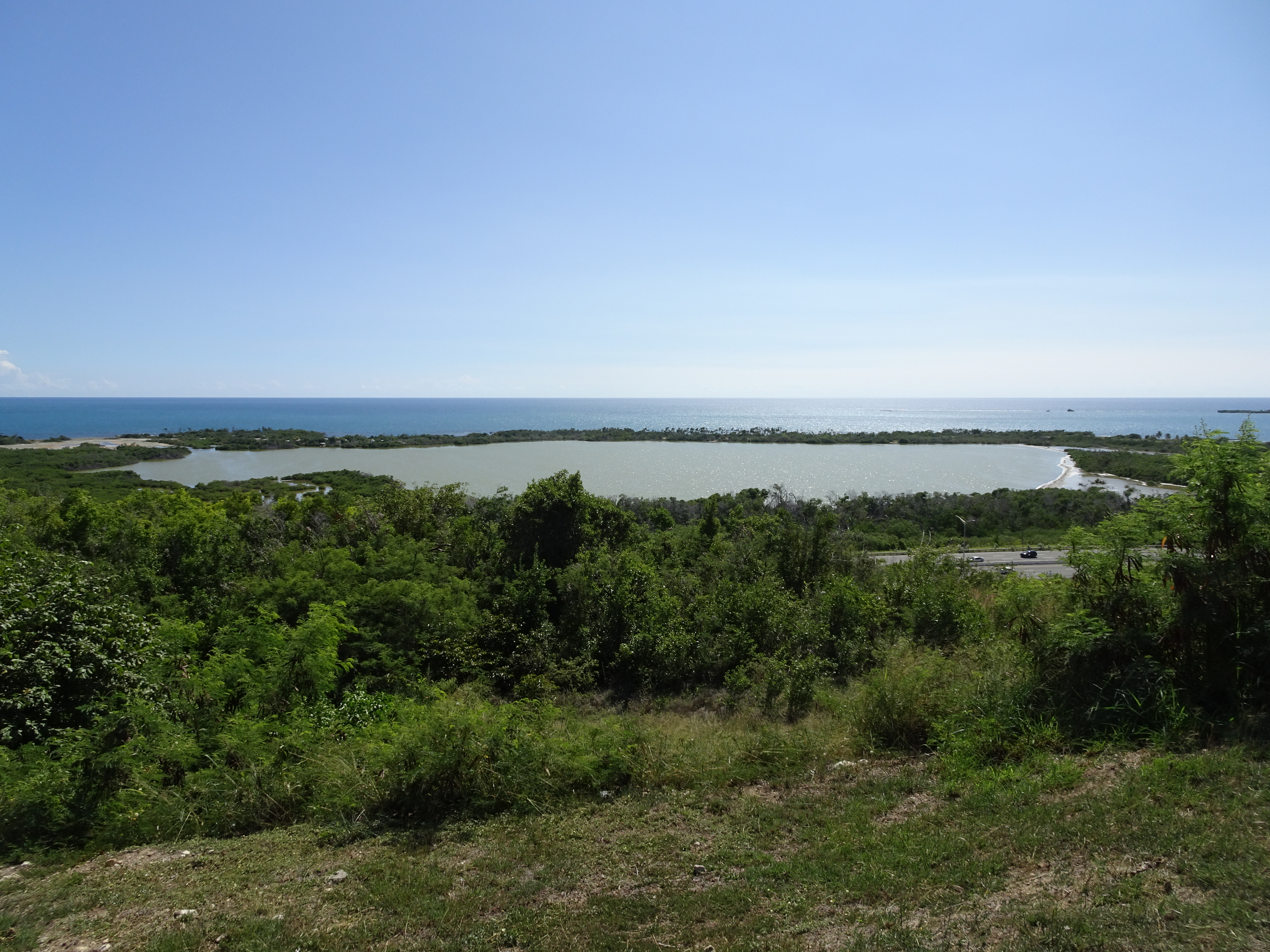
Laguna de las Salinas, the highlight of Reserva Natural Punta Cucharas

In 2001, the Puerto Rico Ornithology Society started promoting the conservation of the Las Cucharas area and proposed it as an Important Area for the Conservation of Birds. Then, during 2003–2004, the United States Geological Survey, with the support of the Ponce Municipal Government, conducted a hydrology study of Laguna Las Salinas. In June 2004, the Integrated Planning Area of the Natural Patrimony Division of the Department of Natural and Environmental Resources of Puerto Rico (DRNA) issued a report on the natural value of the Punta Cucharas area. In 2008, Amigos de La Laguna (Friends of the Lagoon), a local concerned citizens group, issued a press release showing the impact that construction of the Gasoducto del Norte was to have on the lagoon. In August 2008, the Legislature of Puerto Rico passed Law 227 designating the Punta Cucharas natural area as a nature reserve and creating the Punta Cucharas Nature Reserve using, among others, the June 2004 DRNA report. On 9 August 2008, Punta Cucharas became a protected area under the law.

== Location and size ==
The area is located in the coastal and the subcoastal zones of the southern end of Barrio Canas. The area is bounded in the west by a tourist development, including a hotel, in the north by modern residential compounds, and in the south by the Caribbean Sea. It includes all the land southeast of Road PR-2 in Barrio Canas and the marine component of Isla de Ratones and Isla Cardona. The Caribbean Sea Marine Extent component includes the waters south of points from Punta Cucharas in the west and Rio Matilde in the east, both in the Ponce mainland, and north of points from Isla de Ratones in the west and Isla Cardona in the east, both islands south of Ponce. Isla de Ratones and Isla Cardona are both included in the Punta Cucharas Nature Reserve.

It consists of a salt water lagoon known as Laguna Salinas (Salinas Lagoon) that measures 347,898 square meters, as well as forestland systems of mangroves and other coastal forests, and different types of estuary and marshy wetlands. It also includes extensive areas of sand dunes covered by herbaceous vegetation, part of which are gramineous plants. The Reserve's total area is 698 cuerdas. The Salinas Lagoon has a mangrove that expands about 37 acres.

== Ecological value ==
The Municipality of Ponce recognized the ecological value of the Punta Cucharas natural area and included a Special Plan PL. E. 2, on La Matilde Area (the Area that includes the Punta Cuchara area) in its Territorial Plan (Integral Review effective on 23 December 2003), in its Ordination Regulations component. This Special Plan intended to facilitate a residential, tourist and commercial development, contingent on the protection of natural resources such as Laguna Salinas and the wetlands to the south of the area and the conversion of PR-2 to an expressway and the construction of parallel service roads. Among the objectives of the Municipality of Ponce development were the establishment of a protection zone for wetlands and the Laguna Salinas.

The Action Program of the Territorial Ordinance Plan (1993) Judicial Ruling known as Ruling JAC 93–0485 in "Municipality of Ponce vs. Government of Puerto Rico", a.k.a., Ponce en Marcha, was a $615,000 yet-to-be-built project in the Hacienda La Matilde area programmed to be finished during the 1996–97 of the Government of Puerto Rico fiscal year. However, "recognizing the great ecological value of the Punta Cucharas ecosystem, the Territorial Ordinance Plan of the Municipality of Ponce sought to protect the Punta Cucharas area, identifying it as a "high interest" ecotourism area.

== Shoreline geology and habitats ==
The shoreline habitat consists of exposed mangroves, mixed sand and gravel beaches, and fine grained sandy beaches. The Reserve wildlife consists of wading birds and shore birds.

== Flora and fauna ==
The Reserve has 148 flora species, 56 bird species (including both resident or migratory species), five mammal species, nine reptile species, five amphibians, and six fish species.

=== Flora ===
Critically endangered plant species include Cordia rupicola and Leptocereus quadricostatus (sebucan); Endangered is Guaiacum officinale (guaiac tree) and vulnerable is the Maytenus ponceana. Some of the 147 plant species found at the Punta Cucharas Reserve are listed below.

No.	Species	Family	Common Name (Spanish)	Common Name (English)
1	Aloe vera	Liliaceae	sábila	aloe vera
2	Acacia farnesiana	Fabaceae	aroma	sweet acacia
3	Achyranthes aspera	Amaranthaceae	rabo de gato	devil's horsewhip
4	Annona glabra	Annonaceae	cayur	corkwood
5	Antigonon leptopus	Polygonaceae	bellísima	coral vine
6	Arundo donax	Poaceae	caña de castilla	Spanish cane
7	Avicennia germinans	Verbenaceae	mangle negro	black mangrove
8	Batis maritima	Bataceae	yerba de sal	saltwort
9	Boerhavia diffusa	Nyctaginaceae	mata pavo	tarvine
10	Bucida buceras	Combretaceae	ucar	bullet tree
11	Bursera simaruba	Burseraceae	almácigo	copperwood
12	Caesalpinia bonduc	Fabaceae	mato de playa	gray nicker
13	Calotropis procera	Asclepiadaceae	algodón de seda	king's crown
14	Canella winterana	Canellaceae	barbasco	cinnamon bark
15	Canavalia rosea	Fabaceae	haba de playa	beach bean
16	Capparis flexuosa	Capparaceae	palinguan	--
17	Capraria biflora	Scrophulariaceae	té del país	goatweed
18	Cassytha filiformis	Lauraceae	fideillo	lovevine
19	Cissus trifoliata	Vitaceae	bejuco de caro	sorrelvine
20	Cleome viscosa	Capparaceae	volantín	spiderflower
21	Coccoloba diversifolia	Polygonaceae	uvilla	pigeonplum
22	Coccoloba uvifera	Polygonaceae	uva de playa	seagrape
23	Colubrina elliptica	Rhamnaceae	mabí	soldierwood
24	Commelina sp.	Commelinaceae	cohítre	dayflower
25	Conocarpus erectus	Combretaceae	mangle botón	buttomwood
26	Crescentia cujete	Bignoniaceae	higüera	calabash
27	Cynodon dactylon	Poaceae	yerba Bermuda	Bermuda grass
28	Dactyloctenium aegyptium	Poaceae	yerba egipcia	Egyptian crowfoot grass
29	Delonix regia	Fabaceae	flamboyán	poinciana
30	Desmanthus virgatus	Fabaceae	desmanto	wild tantan
31	Digitaria decumbens	Poaceae	pangola	digitgrass
32	Eleusine indica	Eleusine indica	yerba dulce	yard-grass
33	Eupatorium odoratum	Compositae	cariaquillo santa maría	devil weed
34	Euphorbia tirucalli	Euphorbiaceae	esqueleto	naked lady
35	Ficus citrifolia	Moraceae	jagüey	banyantree
36	Fimbristylis dichotoma	Cyperaceae	junquito	forked fimbry
37	Forestiera segregata	Oleaceae	privet	ink-bush
38	Furcraea tuberosa	Agavaceae	maguey	cabuyo
39	Gossipium barbadense	Malvaceae	algodón	cotton
40	Guaiacum officinale	Zygophyllaceae	guayacan	guaiacwood
41	Guazuma ulmifolia	Sterculiaceae	guácima	bay cedar
42	Gymnanthes lucida	Euphorbiaceae	yaití	crabwood
43	Heliotropium curassavicum	Boraginaceae	cotorrera de playa	seaside heliotrope
44	Heteropogon contortus	Poaceae	yerba torcida	black speargrass
45	Hippomane mancinella	Euphorbiaceae	manzanillo	manchineel tree
46	Ipomoea pes-caprae	Convolvulaceae	bejuco de playa	beach morning glory
47	Jatropha gossypiifolia	Euphorbiaceae	túa-túa	bellyache bush
48	Krugiodendron ferreum	Rhamnaceae	bariaco	leadwood
49	Laguncularia racemosa	Verbenaceae	mangle blanco	white mangrove
50	Lantana involucrata	Verbenaceae	cariaquillo	buttonsage
51	Leucaena leucocephala	Fabaceae	zarzilla	white leadtree
52	Macfadyena unguis-cati	Bignoniaceae	uña de gato	cat's claw creeper
53	Melicoccus bijugatus	Sapindaceae	quenepa	genip
54	Metopium toxiferum	Anacardiaceae	papayo	poisonwood
55	Opuntia repens	Cactaceae	cactus saltarín*	roving pricklypear
56	Parkinsonia aculeata	Fabaceae	palo de rayo	Parkinsonia aculeata
57	Passiflora suberosa	Passifloraceae	flor de pasión	passionflower
58	Paspalum laxum	Poaceae	matojo de arena	bahiagrass
59	Pennisetum setaceum	Poaceae	yerba	crimson fountaingrass
60	Phoenix dactylifera	Araceae	palma de datil	date palm
61	Pilosocereus armatus (syn. P. royenii var. amatus)	Cactaceae	sebucan	dildo cactus
62	Pisonia albida	Nyctaginaceae	corcho	birdcatcher tree
63	Pithecellobium dulce	Fabaceae	guamá americano	--
64	Plumbago scandens	Plumbaginaceae	meladillo	doctorbush
65	Portulaca oleracea	Portulacaceae	verdolaga	pigweed
66	Prosopis juliflora	Fabaceae	bayahonda	mesquite
67	Randia aculeata	Rubiaceae	tintillo	white indigoberry
68	Rhizophora mangle	Rhizophoraceae	mangle rojo	red mangrove
69	Rivina humilis	Phytolaccaceae	carmín	pigeonberry
70	Roystonea borinquena	Arecaceae	palma real	Puerto Rican royal palm
71	Ruppia maritima	Ruppiaceae	yerba de zanja	ditch-grass
72	Rhynchosia minima	Fabaceae	frijolillo	jumby-bean
73	Sesbania sericea	Fabaceae	papagayo	riverhemp
74	Sesuvium portulacastrum	Portulacaceae	verdolaga rosada	shoreline purslane
75	Solanum elaeagnifolium	Solanaceae	trompillo	silverleaf nightshade
76	Sporobolus virginicus	Poaceae	matojo de burro	seashore dropseed
77	Tabebuia heterophylla	Bignoniaceae	roble blanco	white cedar
78	Talinum paniculatum	Portulacaceae	lengua de vaca	pink baby's-breath
79	Tamarindus indica	Fabaceae	tamarindo	tamarind
80	Thespesia populnea	Malvaceae	emajagüilla	Portia tree
81	Tillandsia recurvata	Bromeliaceae	pirigallo	small ballmoss
82	Urochloa maxima	Poaceae	yerba de guinea	Guinea grass
83	Vernonia cinerea	Compositae	yerba socialista	little ironweed

=== Fauna ===
==== Birds ====
Fifty-six bird species have been identified in the Reserve. Five of them are endemic species. A partial catalog of the bird species found in the Reserve includes Charrancito (Sternula antillarum), a key IBA waterfowl species that breeds in the area. Endemic species are: Zumbador Verde (Anthracothorax viridis), Chlorostilbon maugaeus, San Pedrito (Todus mexicanus), Carpintero (Melanerpes portoricensis), Juí (Myiarchus antillarum), Bienteveo (Vireo latimeri), Reinita Mariposera (Dendroica adelaidae), Comeñame (Loxigilla portoricensis), and Reina Mora (Spindalis portoricensis). Mariquita (Agelaius xanthomus) flies into the area but does not reside there. Other bird species are: Zumbador Dorado (Anthracothorax dominicus), Zumbador Pechiazul (Eulampis holosericeus), Zorzal Pardo (Margarops fuscatus) and Jilguero (Euphonia musica).

There are 56 species identified of which six are endemic, 44 are resident, five are migratory and one is introduced. The following table lists a sampling of them.

No.	Family	Species	Common Name (Spanish)	Common Name (English)	Status
1	Alcedinidae	Ceryle alcyon	martín pescador	belted kingfisher	Migratory
2	Anatidae	Anas bahamensis	pato quijada colorada	white-cheeked pintail	Resident
3	Anatidae	Anas discors	pato zarcel	blue-winged teal	Migratory
4	Ardeidae	Ardea alba	garza real	great egret	Resident
5	Ardeidae	Ardea herodias	garzón cenizo	great blue heron	Resident
6	Ardeidae	Bubulcus ibis	garza ganadera	cattle egret	Resident
7	Ardeidae	Egretta caerulea	garza azul	little blue heron	Resident
8	Ardeidae	Egretta thula	garza blanca	snowy egret	Resident
9	Ardeidae	Egretta tricolor	garza pechiblanca	tricolored heron	Resident
10	Ardeidae	Nyctanassa violacea	yaboa común	yellow-crowned night heron	Resident
11	Cathartidae	Cathartes aura	aura tiñosa	turkey vulture	Resident
12	Charadriidae	Charadrius semipalmatus	playero acollarado	semipalmated plover	Resident
13	Charadriidae	Charadrius wilsonia	playerito marítimo	Wilson's plover	Resident
14	Charadriidae	Pluvialis squatarola	playero cabezón	grey plover	Resident
15	Coerebidae	Coereba flaveola	reinita común	bananaquit	Resident
16	Columbidae	Columbina passerina	rolita	common ground dove	Resident
17	Columbidae	Zenaida asiatica	tórtola aliblanca	white-winged dove	Resident
18	Cuculidae	Crotophaga ani	judío	smooth-billed ani	Resident
19	Emberizidae	Dendroica adelaidae	reinita mariposera	Adelaide's warbler	Resident
20	Emberizidae	Dendroica petechia	canario de mangle	American yellow warbler	Resident
21	Emberizidae	Dendroica tigrina	reinita tigre	Cape May warbler	Migratory
22	Emberizidae	Loxigilla portoricensis	comeñame	Puerto Rican bullfinch	Endemic
23	Emberizidae	Seiurus noveboracensis	pizpita de mangle	northern waterthrush	Migratory
24	Emberizidae	Tiaris bicolor	gorrión negro	black-faced grassquit	Resident
25	Falconidae	Buteo jamaicensis	guaraguao	red-tailed hawk	Resident
26	Falconidae	Falco peregrinus	halcón peregrino	peregrine falcon	Migratory
27	Falconidae	Falco sparverius	falcón común	American kestrel	Resident
28	Fregatidae	Fregata magnificens	tijereta de mar	magnificent frigatebird	Resident
29	Icteridae	Icterus dominicensis	calandria	Hispaniolan oriole	Resident
30	Icteridae	Icterus icterus	turpial	Venezuelan troupial	Introduced
31	Icteridae	Molothrus bonariensis	tordo lustroso	shiny cowbird	Resident
32	Icteridae	Quiscalus niger	chango	Greater Antillean grackle	Resident
33	Laridae	Larus atricilla	gaviota gallega	laughing gull	Resident
34	Mimidae	Mimus polyglottos	ruiseñor	northern mockingbird	Resident
35	Muscicapidae	Turdus plumbeus	zorzal de patas coloradas	red-legged thrush	Resident
36	Pandionidae	Pandion haliaetus	águila de mar	osprey	Resident
37	Pelecanidae	Pelecanus occidentalis	pelicano pardo	brown pelican	Resident
38	Recurvirostridae	Himantopus mexicanus	viuda	black-necked stilt	Resident
39	Scolopacidae	Actitis macularia	playero coleador	spotted sandpiper	Resident
40	Scolopacidae	Arenaria interpres	playero Turco	ruddy turnstone	Resident
41	Scolopacidae	Calidris himantopus	playero patilargo	stilt sandpiper	Resident
42	Scolopacidae	Calidris mauri	playerito occidental	western sandpiper	Resident
43	Scolopacidae	Calidris melanotos	playero manchado	pectoral sandpiper	Migratory
44	Scolopacidae	Calidris minutilla	playero menudo	least sandpiper	Resident
45	Scolopacidae	Calidris pusilla	playerito gracioso	semipalmated sandpiper	Resident
46	Scolopacidae	Catoptrophorus semipalmatus	playero aliblanco	willet	Resident
47	Scolopacidae	Limnodromus griseus	chorlo pico corto	short-billed dowitcher	Resident
48	Scolopacidae	Tringa flavipes	playero guineilla menor	lesser yellowlegs	Resident
49	Scolopacidae	Tringa solitaria	playero solitario	solitary sandpiper	Resident
50	Thraupidae	Spindalis portoricensis	reina mora	Puerto Rican spindalis	Endemic
51	Todidae	Todus mexicanus	San Pedrito	Puerto Rican tody	Endemic
52	Tyrannidae	Myiarchus antillarum	juí de Puerto Rico	Puerto Rican flycatcher	Endemic
53	Tyrannidae	Tyrannus dominicensis	pitirre	gray kingbird	Endemic
54	Vireonidae	Vireo latimeri	bien te veo	Puerto Rican vireo	Endemic

==== Mammals ====
The following five species of mammals were found in Punta Cuchara.

No.	Family	Species	Common Name (Spanish)	Common Name (English)	Status
1	Muridae	Rattus rattus	rata negra	black rat	Introduced
2	Muridae	Rattus norvegicus	rata de noruega	brown rat	Introduced
3	Muridae	Mus musculus	ratón	house mouse	Introduced
4	Viverridae	Urva auropunctata	mangosta	small Asian mongoose	Introduced
5	Canidae	Canis familiaris	perro	domestic dog	Domestic

==== Reptiles ====
Punta Cucharas biodiversity includes reptiles such as Hemidactylus brookii, Sphaerodactylus macrolepis, Sphaerodactylus roosevelti, Anolis cristatellus, Anolis pulchellus, Ameiva exsul, and Anolis poncensis, and the amphibians Bufo marinus, Eleutherodactylus coqui and Leptodactylus albilabris. Of the reptile species, the lagartijo jardinero del sur (Anolis poncensis) is protected under the "vulnerable" classification by Rule 6766 of the "Regulations to Govern Vulnerable and Endangered Species in the Commonwealth of Puerto Rico" pursuant to Puerto Rico Law 241, commonly known as "The Puerto Rico Wildlife Law". Following is a listing of reptiles found at the Reserve.

No.	Family	Species	Common Name (Spanish)	Common Name (English)	Status
1	Gekkonidae	Hemidactylus brooki haitianus	salamanquesa	Brooke's house gecko	Native
2	Gekkonidae	Sphaerodactylus macrolepis	salamaquita de la Virgen	Big-scaled least gecko	Native
3	Gekkonidae	Sphaerodactylus roosevelti	salamaquita de la Virgen	--	Endemic
4	Iguanidae	Anolis cristatellus	lagartijo común	crested anole	Native
5	Iguanidae	Anolis pulchellus	lagartijo jardinero	Sharp-mouthed lizard	Native
6	Iguanidae	Anolis poncensis	lagartijo jardinero del sur	Ponce anole	Endemic (Vulnerable)
7	Teiidae	Ameiva exsul	siguana	Puerto Rican ground lizard	Native

==== Amphibians ====
No.	Family	Species	Common Name (Spanish)	Common Name (English)	Status
1	Bufonidae	Bufo marinus	sapo común	cane toad	Introduced
2	Leptodactylidae	Eleutherodactylus coqui	coquí común	common coquí	Endemic
3	Leptodactylidae	Leptodactylus albilabris	ranita de labio blanco	Hispaniolan ditch frog	Native

== Environmental challenges ==
=== Clean up ===
The June 2004 DRNA study warned that due to the lack of surveillance and the easy access that several roads provide to the area, it had become a common practice to use the area as a clandestine junk yard for motor vehicles and other refuse. The report suggested strategies for the management, cleaning, reforestation and conservation of the area. Several groups, including civic, environmental, and church groups, interested in the conservation of the Salinas Lagoon as part of the Punta Cucharas natural area have participated in cleaning campaigns for the removal of junk with the collaboration of the Municipality of Ponce. The DRNA also took steps to reforest the area. In 2013, some vandals used the area for dumping construction refuse, a practice that carries a fine of $5,000.

=== Legal efforts ===
As an additional vehicle to preserve the area, the government of Puerto Rico included Punta Cucharas as a natural reserve under the Natural Patrimony Program created by Act No. 150 of August 4, 1988, known as the "Puerto Rico Natural Patrimony Program Act".

== Facilities improvements ==
In October 2012, the Puerto Rico Department of Natural and Environmental Resources published a 54-page environmental impact evaluation with numerous appendixes. In it, the DRNA proposed relocating the existing main vehicular entrance and building the necessary entryway and signing, making improvements to the existing road, building gazebos for group picnics and relaxation plus a gazebo for nature talks, construction a floating dock for kayaks, creation of an additional dock for ondock-fishing, erecting an observation tower and building a restaurant, a boat ramp, and bathroom facilities (compost toilets). The development area would cover 283 cuerdas (275 acres). As a low environmental impact construction project, the plans include no new water, sewer, or electrical lines being brought into the area. The cost was estimated at $1.2 million.

== Gallery of flora and fauna ==
=== Flora at Punta Cucharas ===
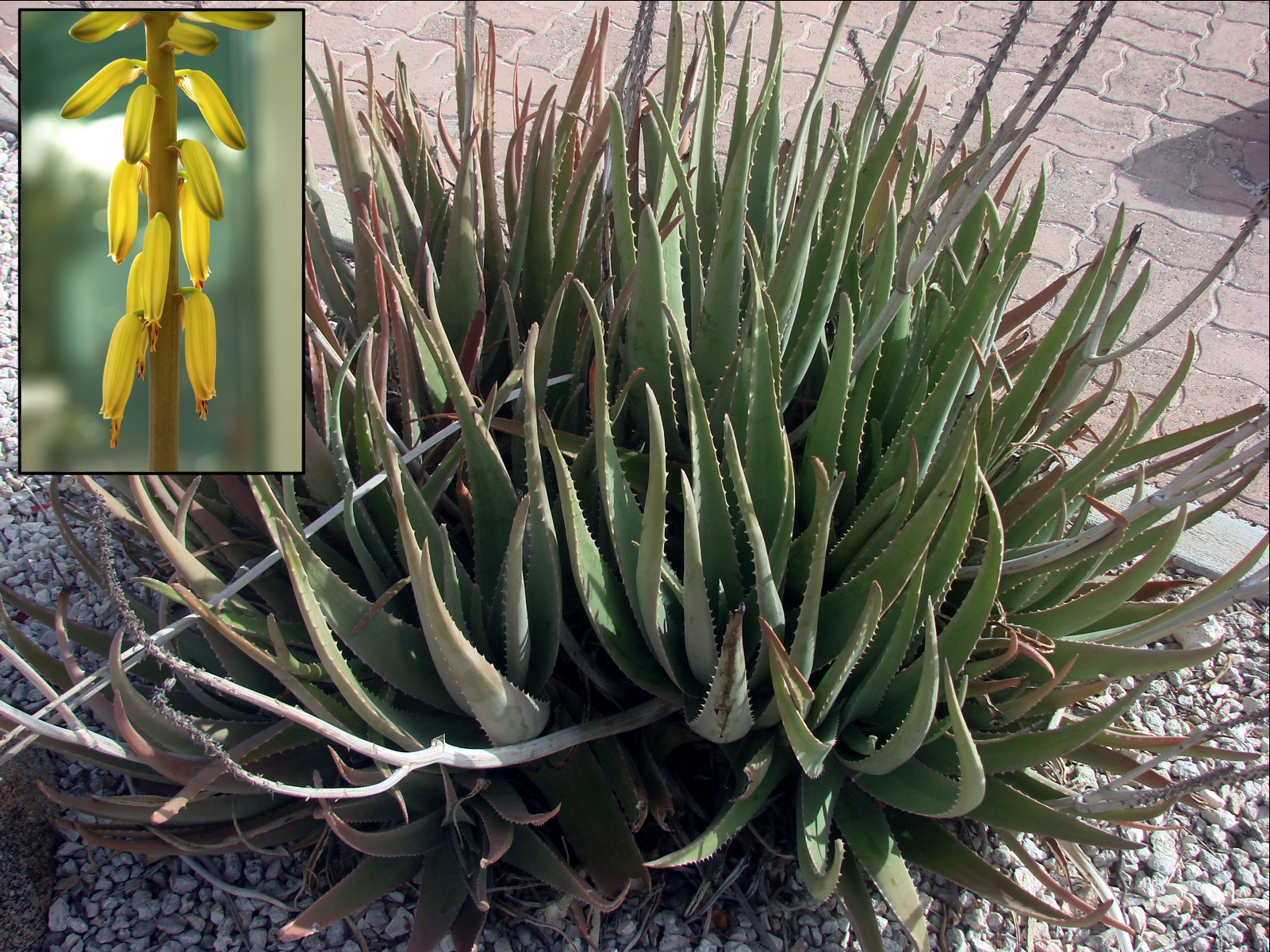
Sábila
(Aloe vera)

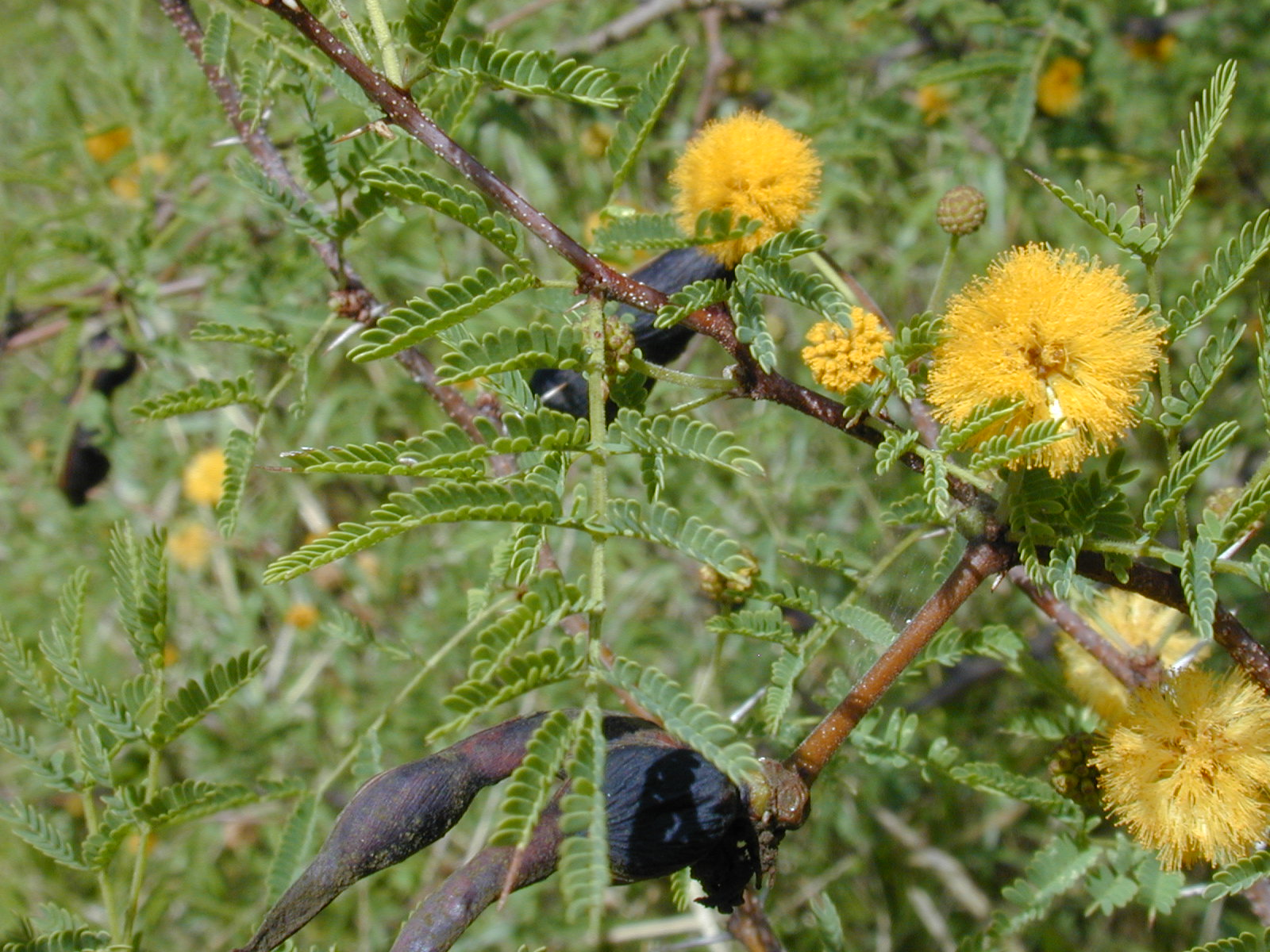
Aroma
(Vachellia farnesiana)

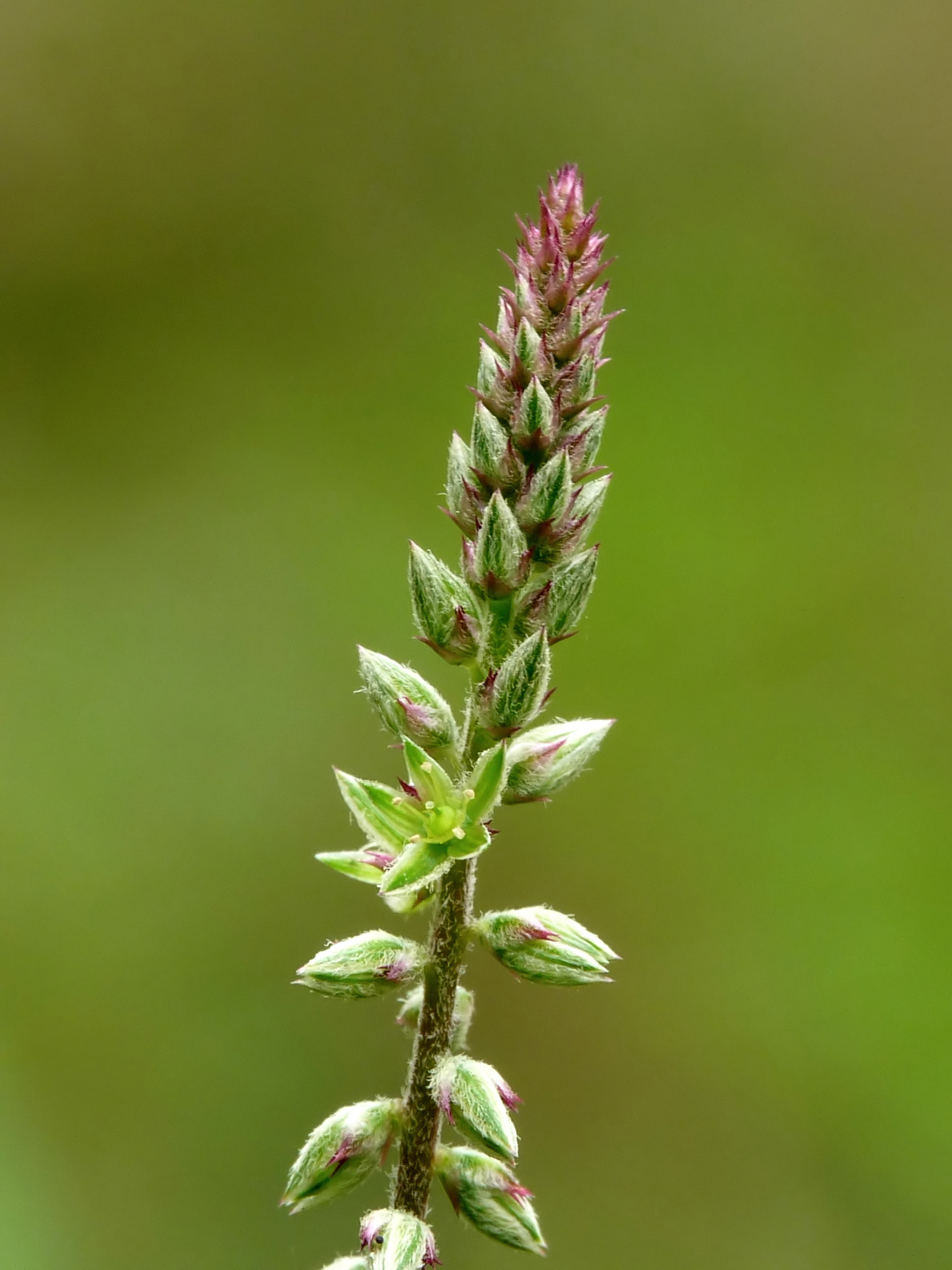
Rabo de gato
(Achyranthes aspera)

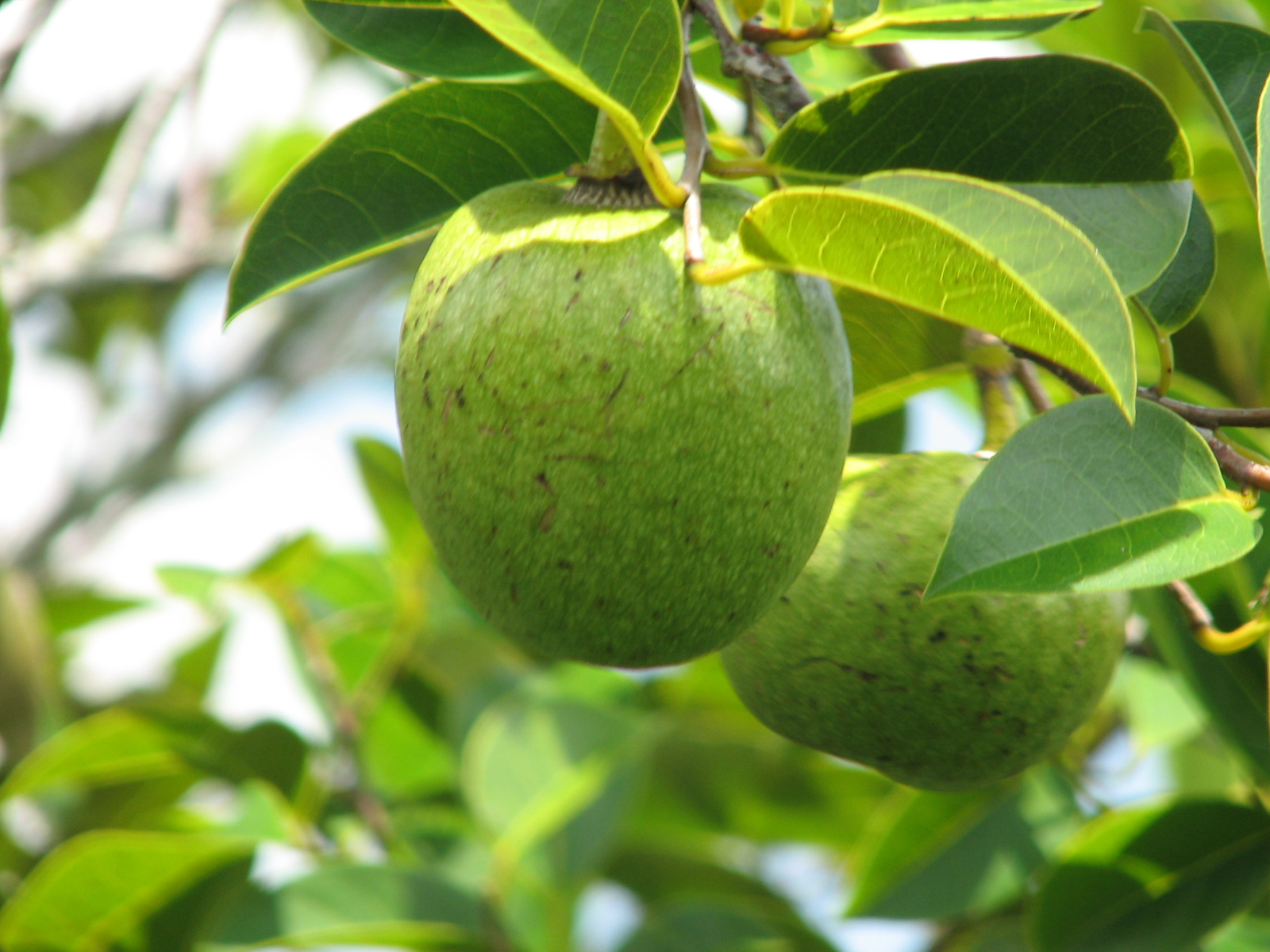
Cayur
(Annona glabra)

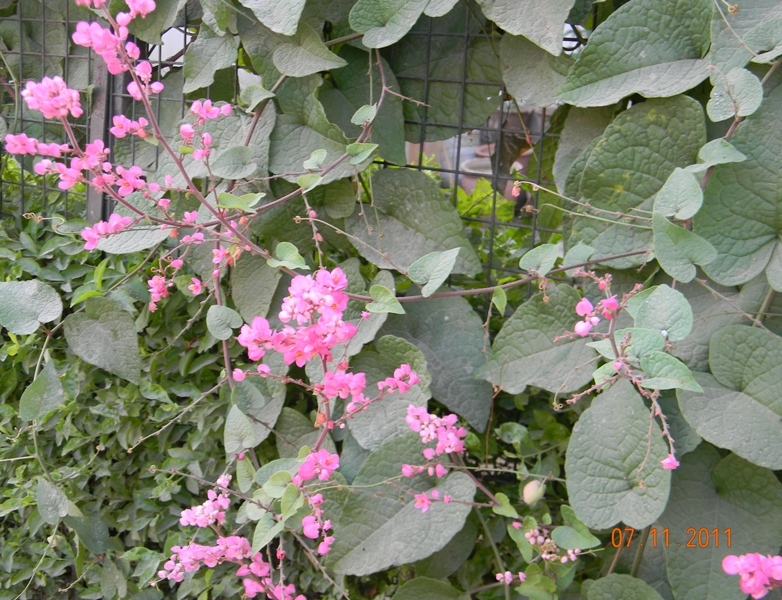
Bellísima
(Antigonon leptopus)

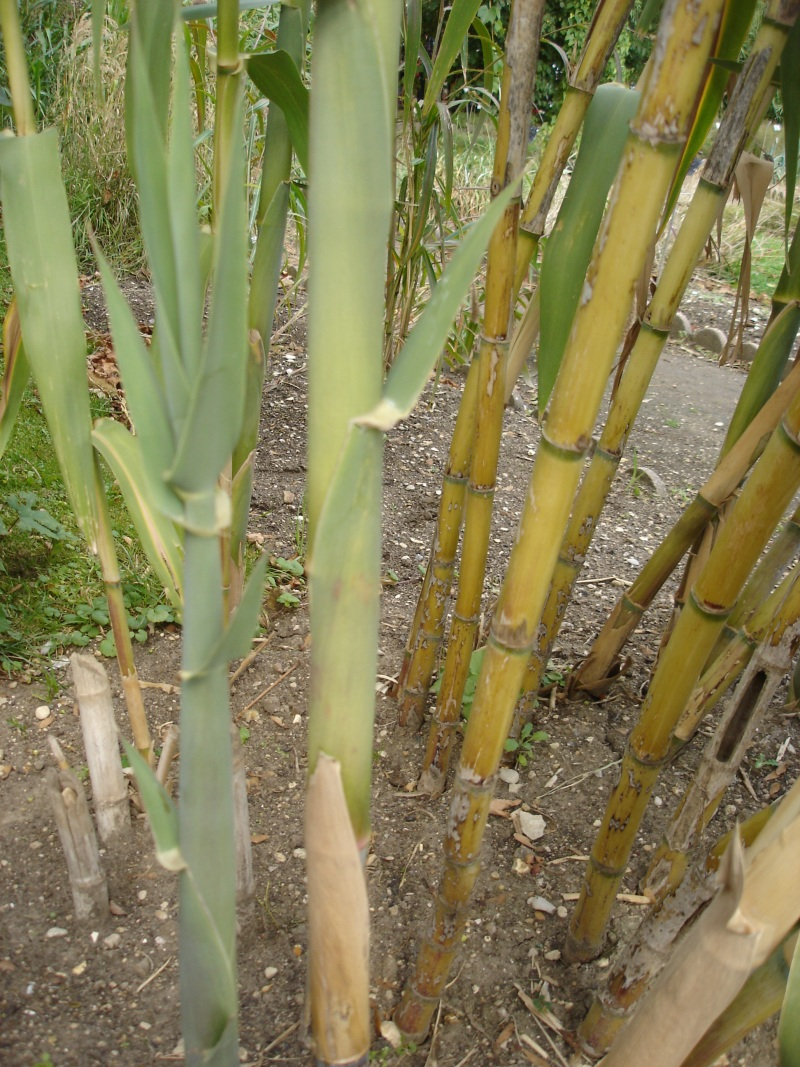
Caña de castilla
(Arundo donax)

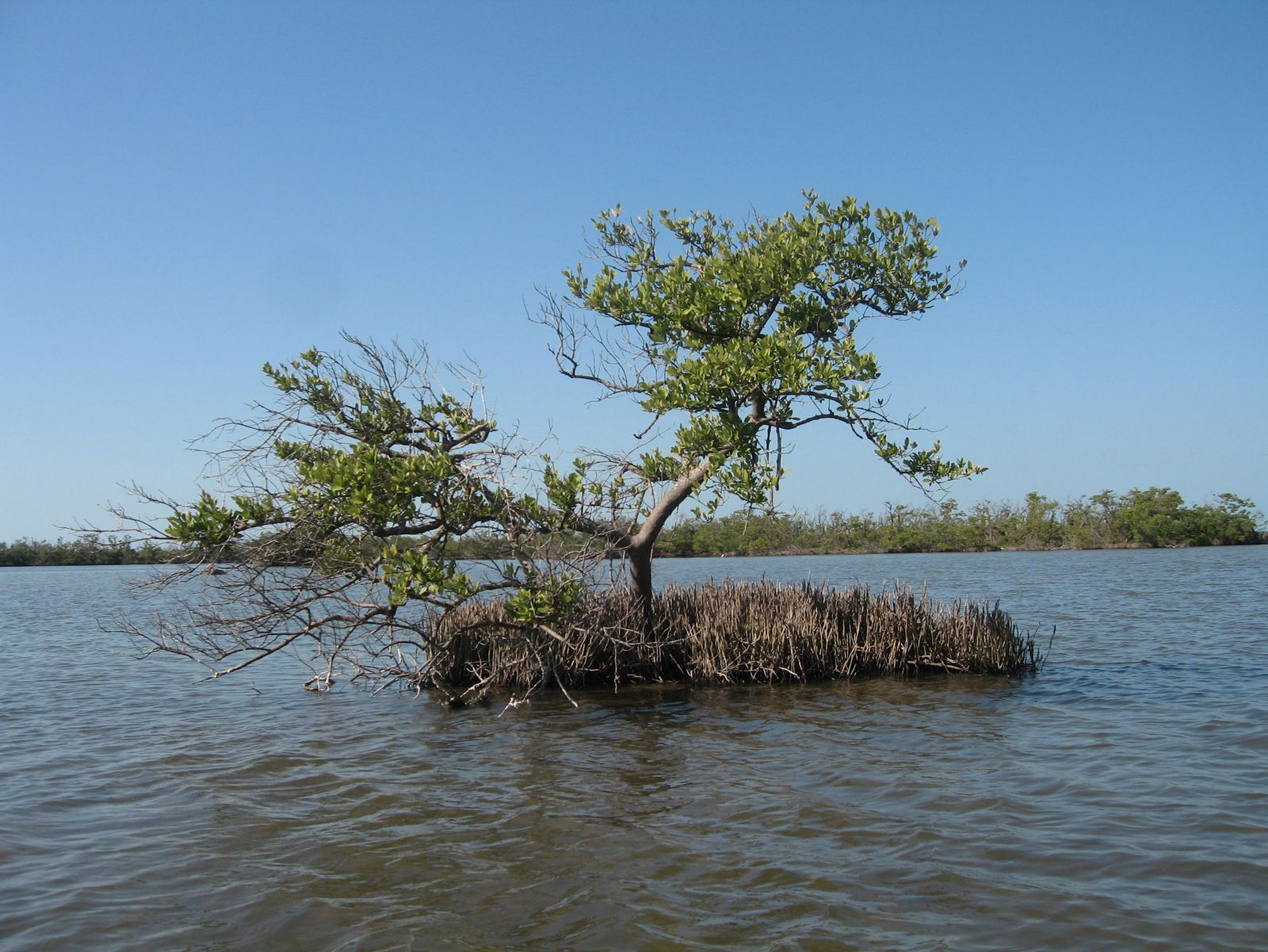
Mangle negro
(Avicennia germinans)

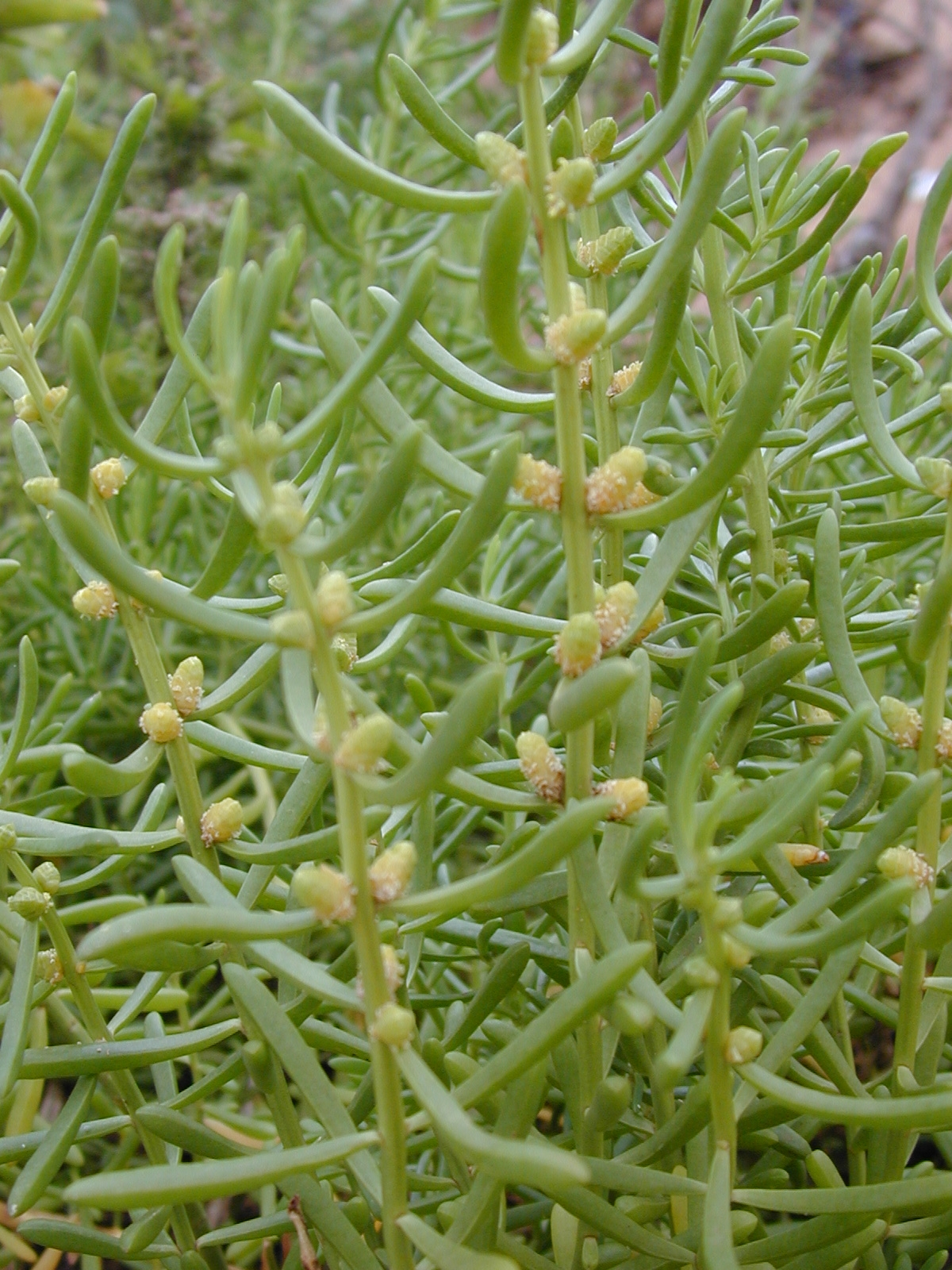
Yerba de sal
(Batis maritima)

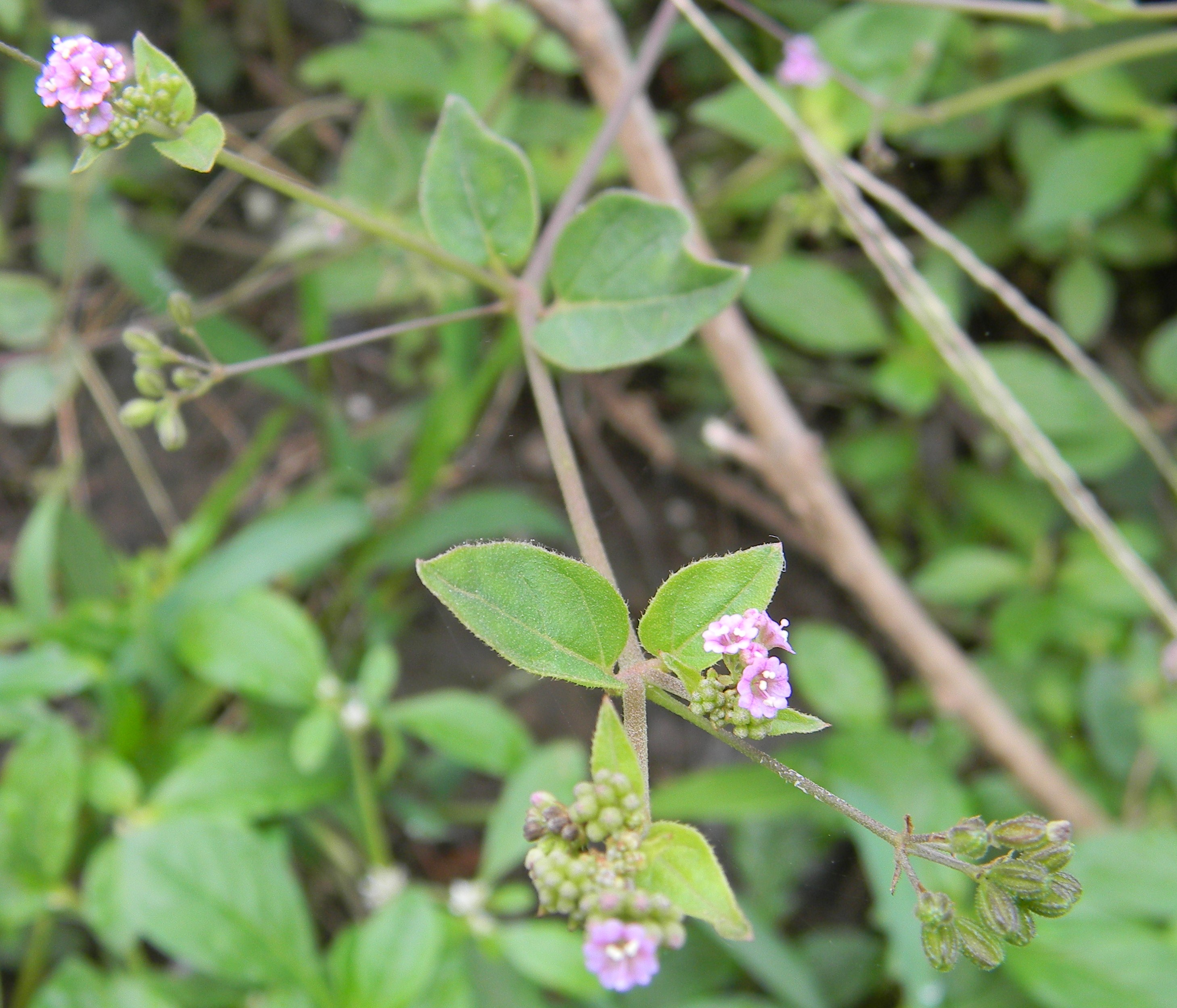
Mata pavo
(Boerhavia diffusa)

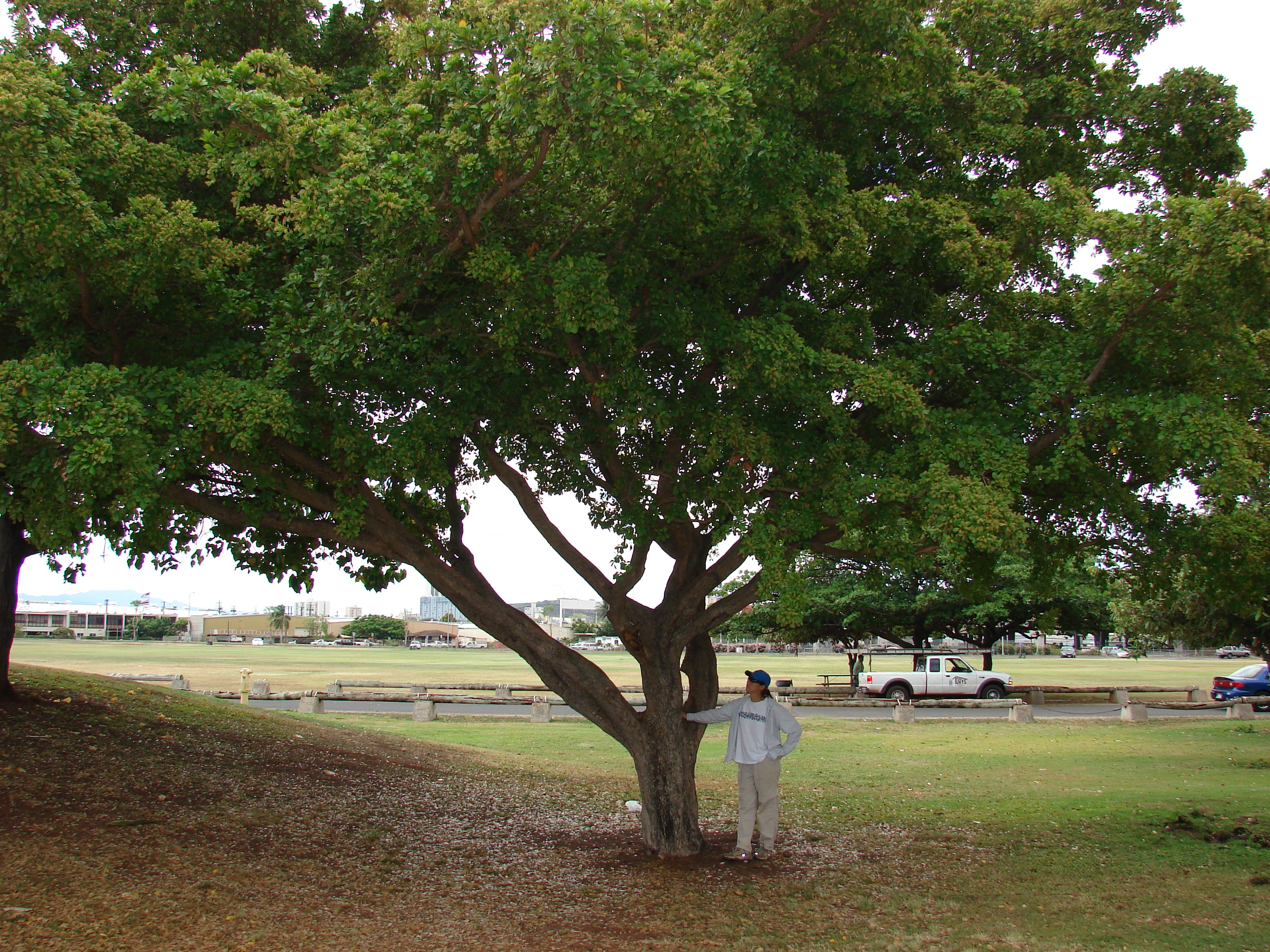
Ucar
(Bucida buceras)

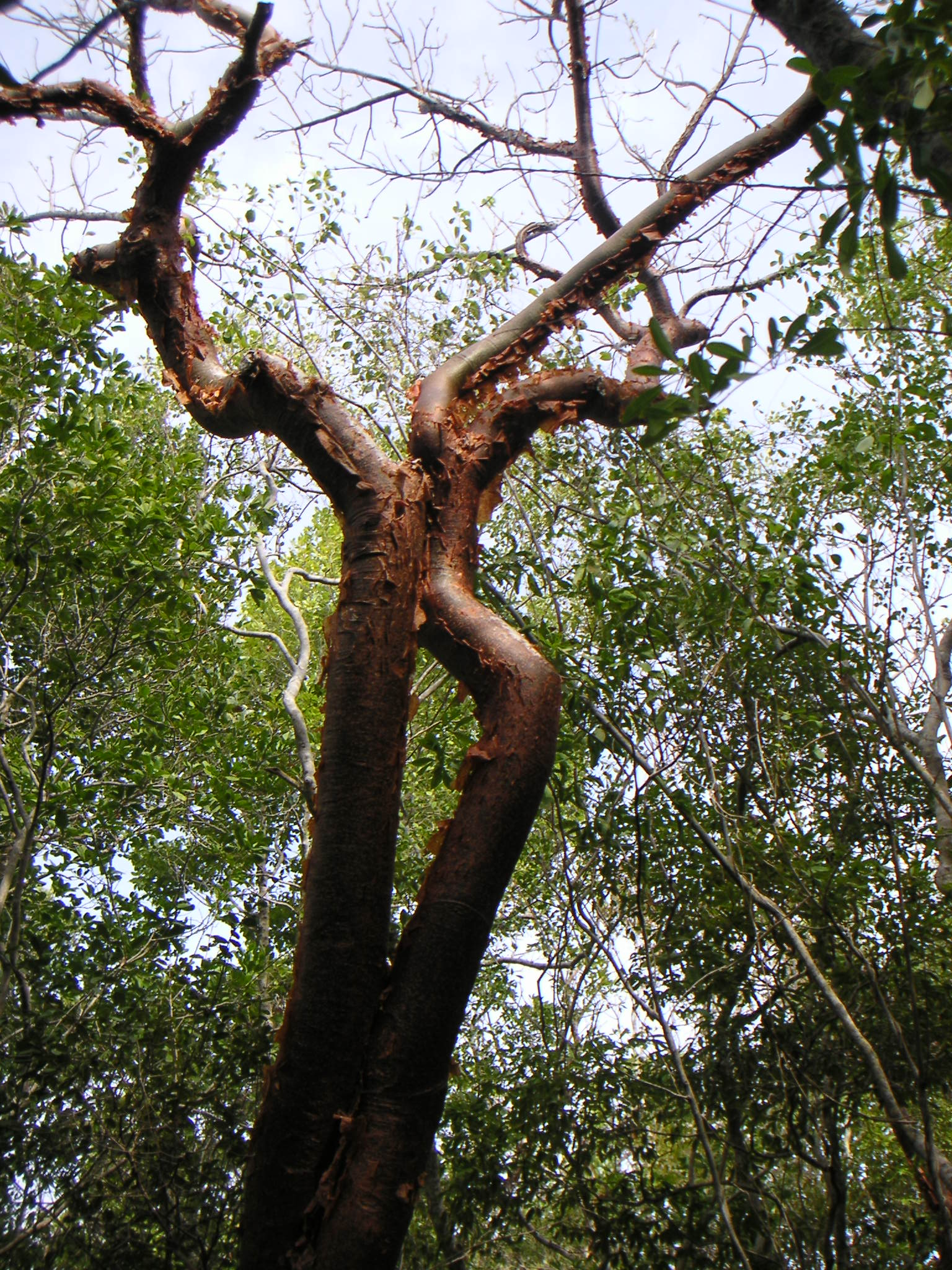
Almácigo
(Bursera simaruba)

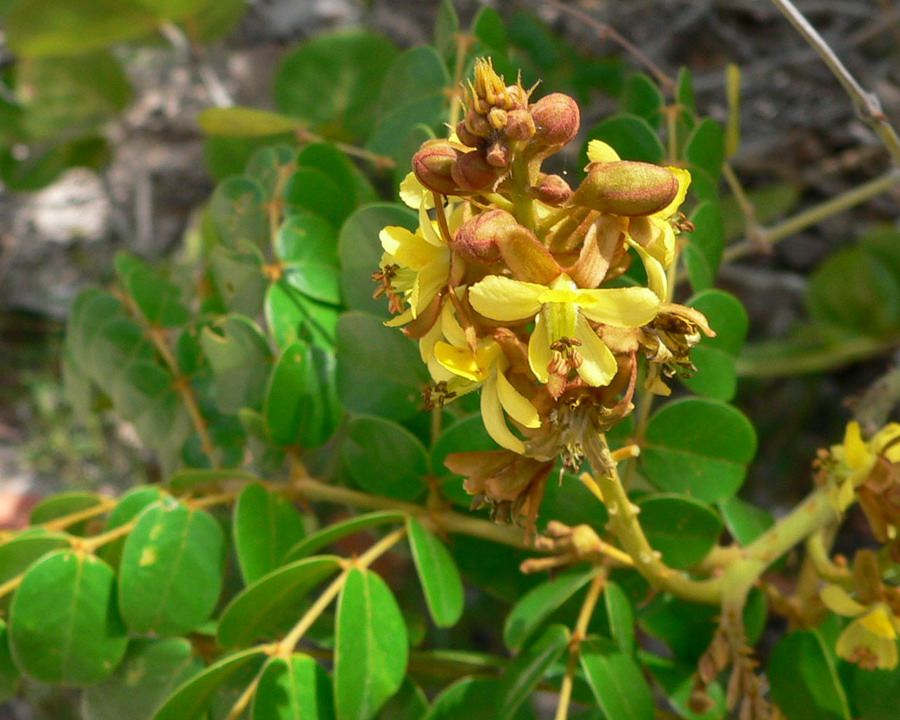
Mato de playa
(Caesalpinia bonduc)

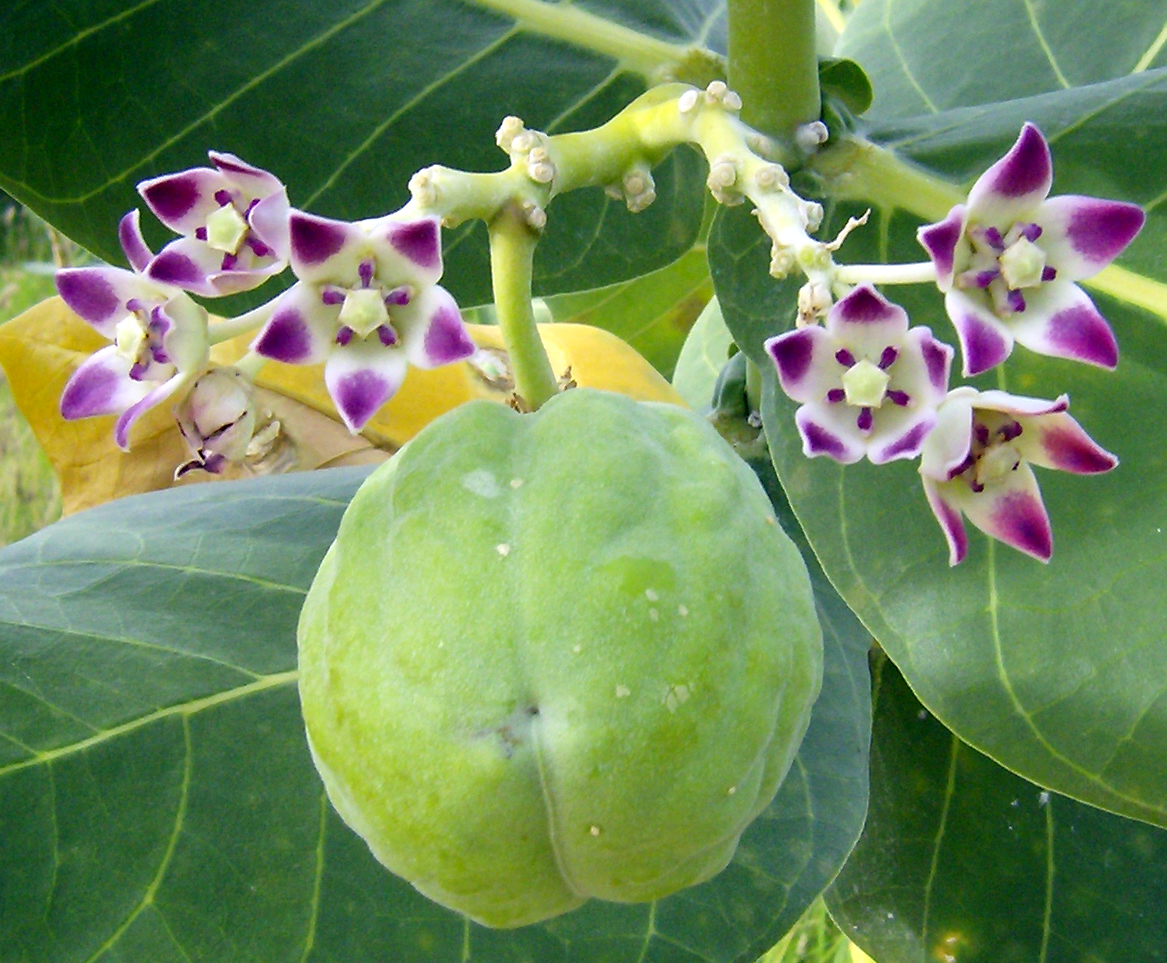
Algodón de seda
(Calotropis procera)

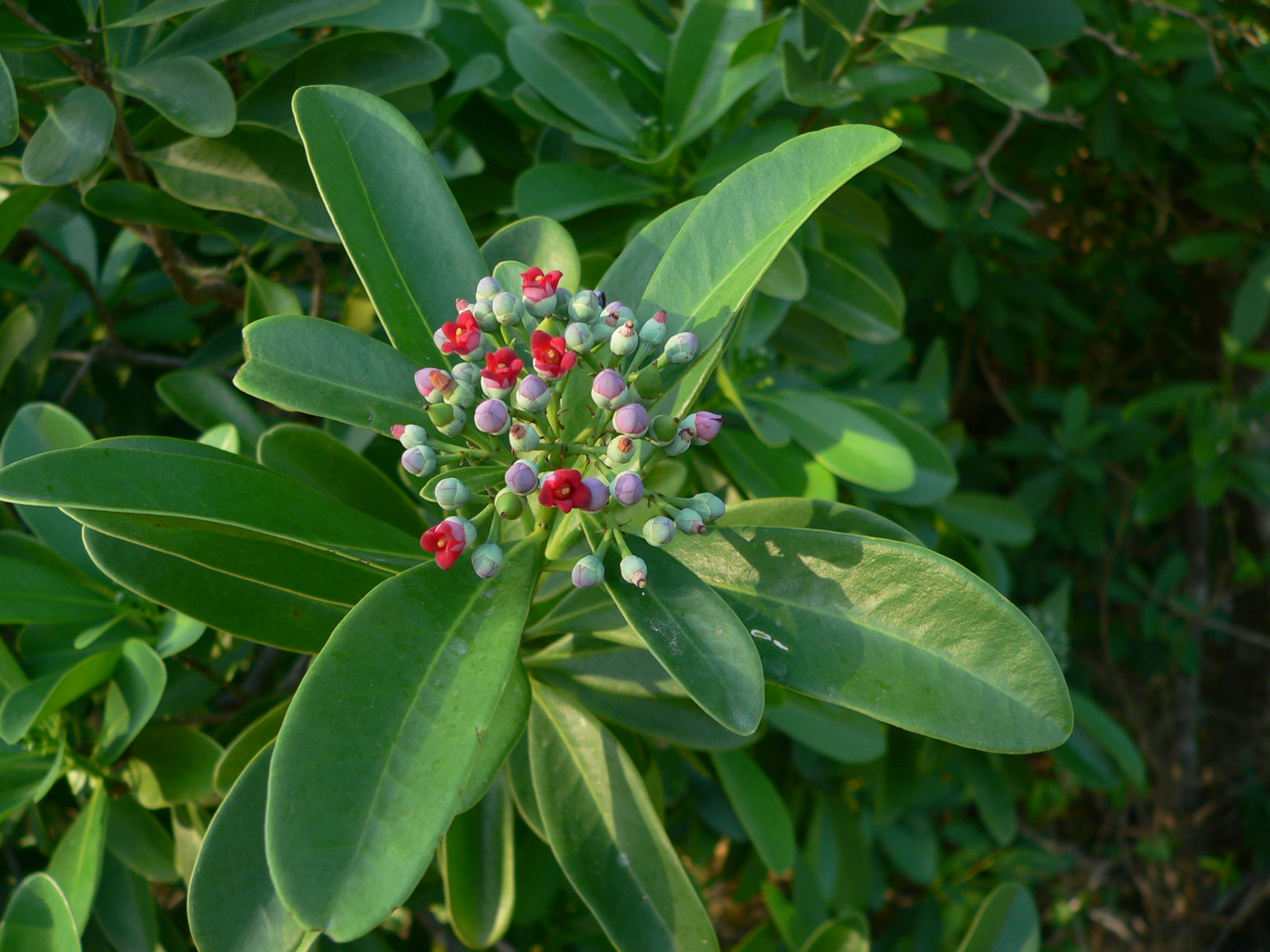
Barbasco
(Canella winterana)

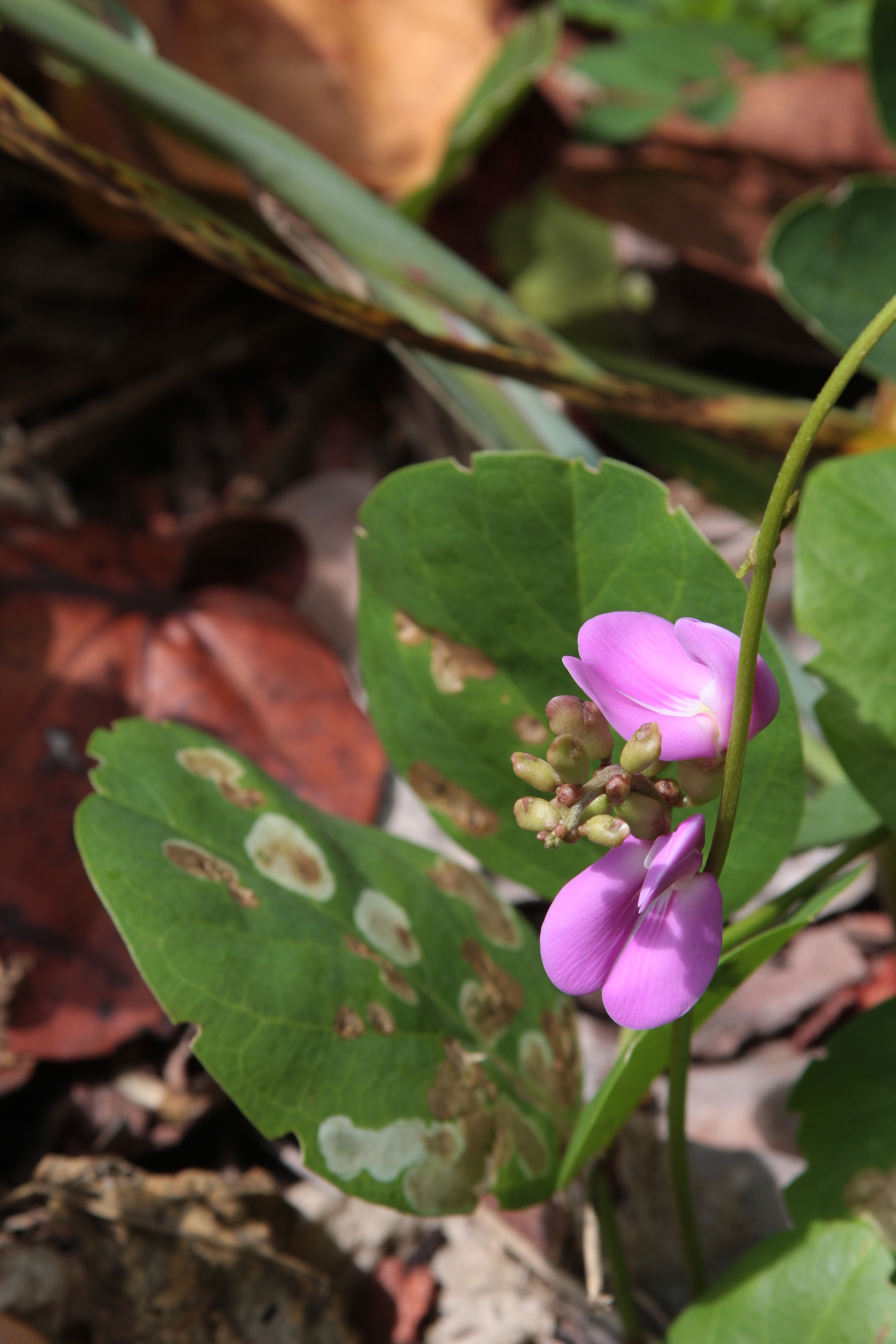
Haba de playa
(Canavalia rosea)

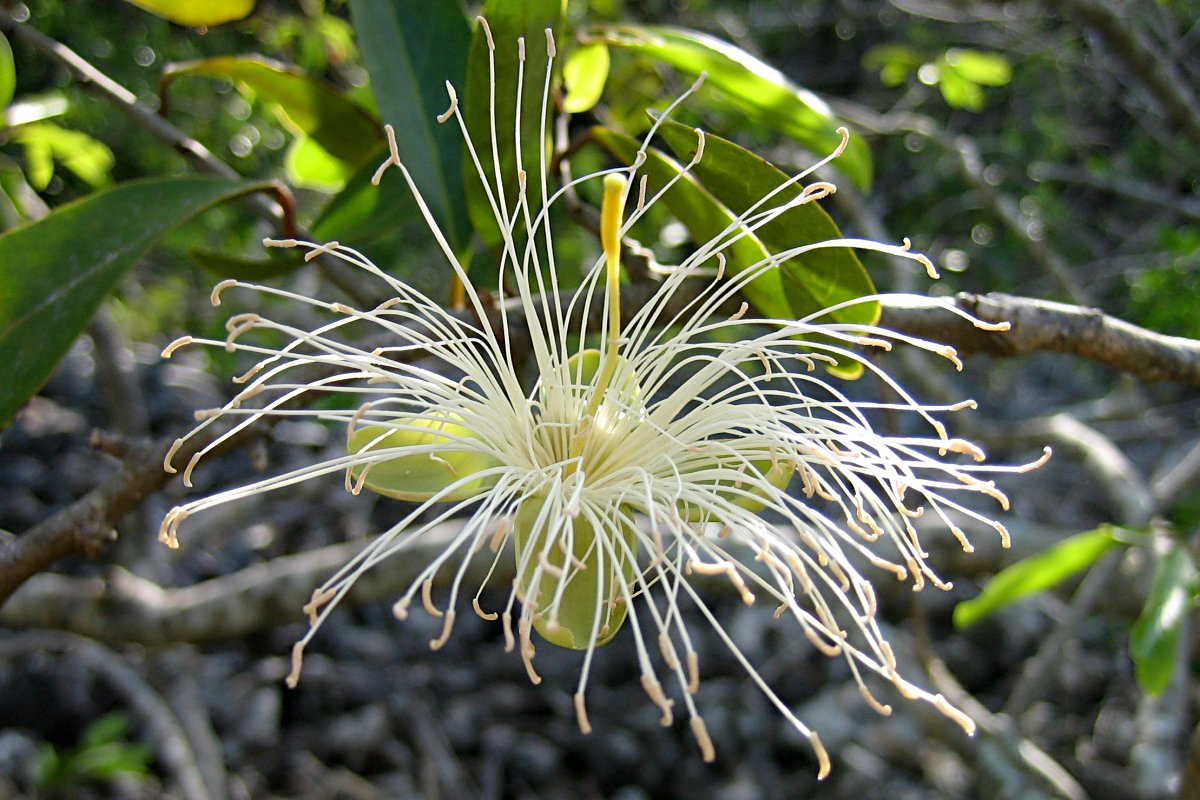
Palinguan
(Capparis flexuosa)

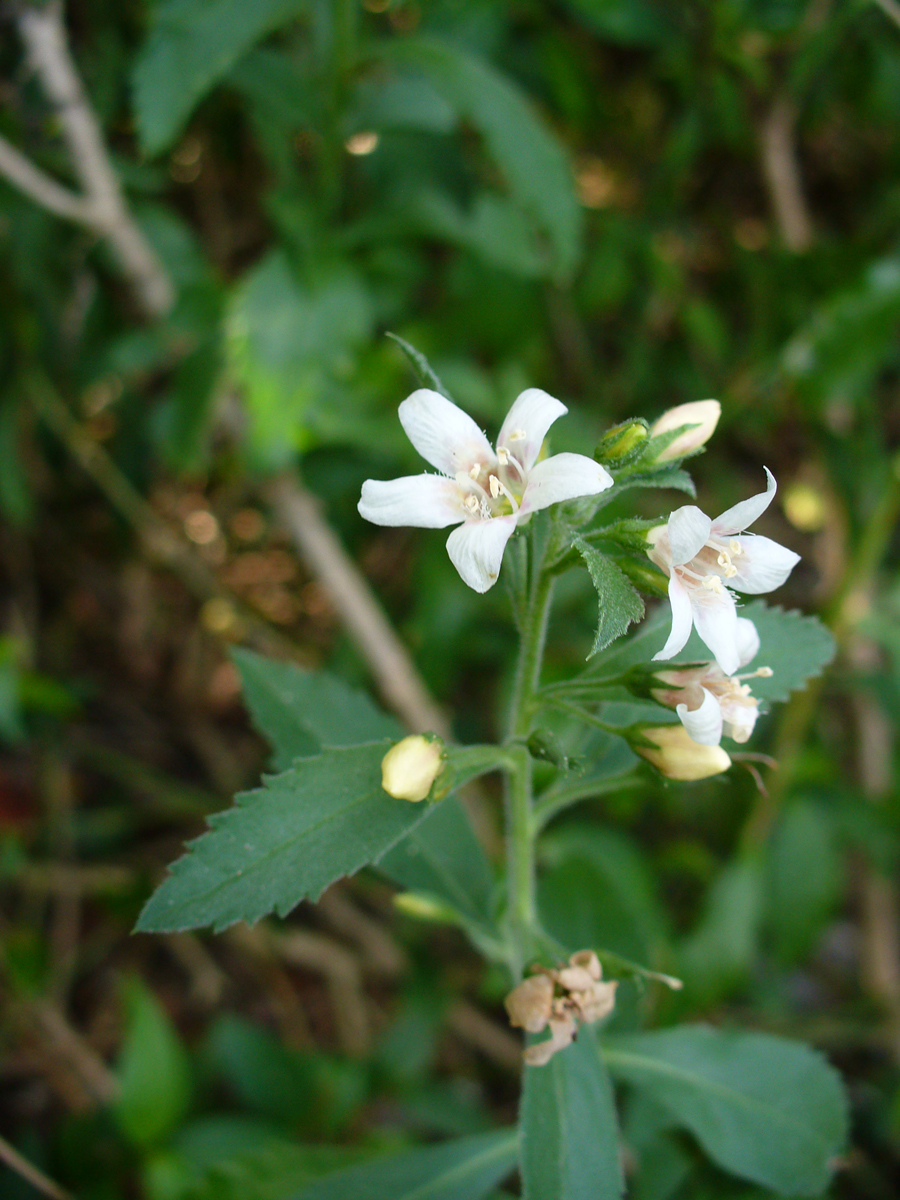
Té del país
(Capraria biflora)

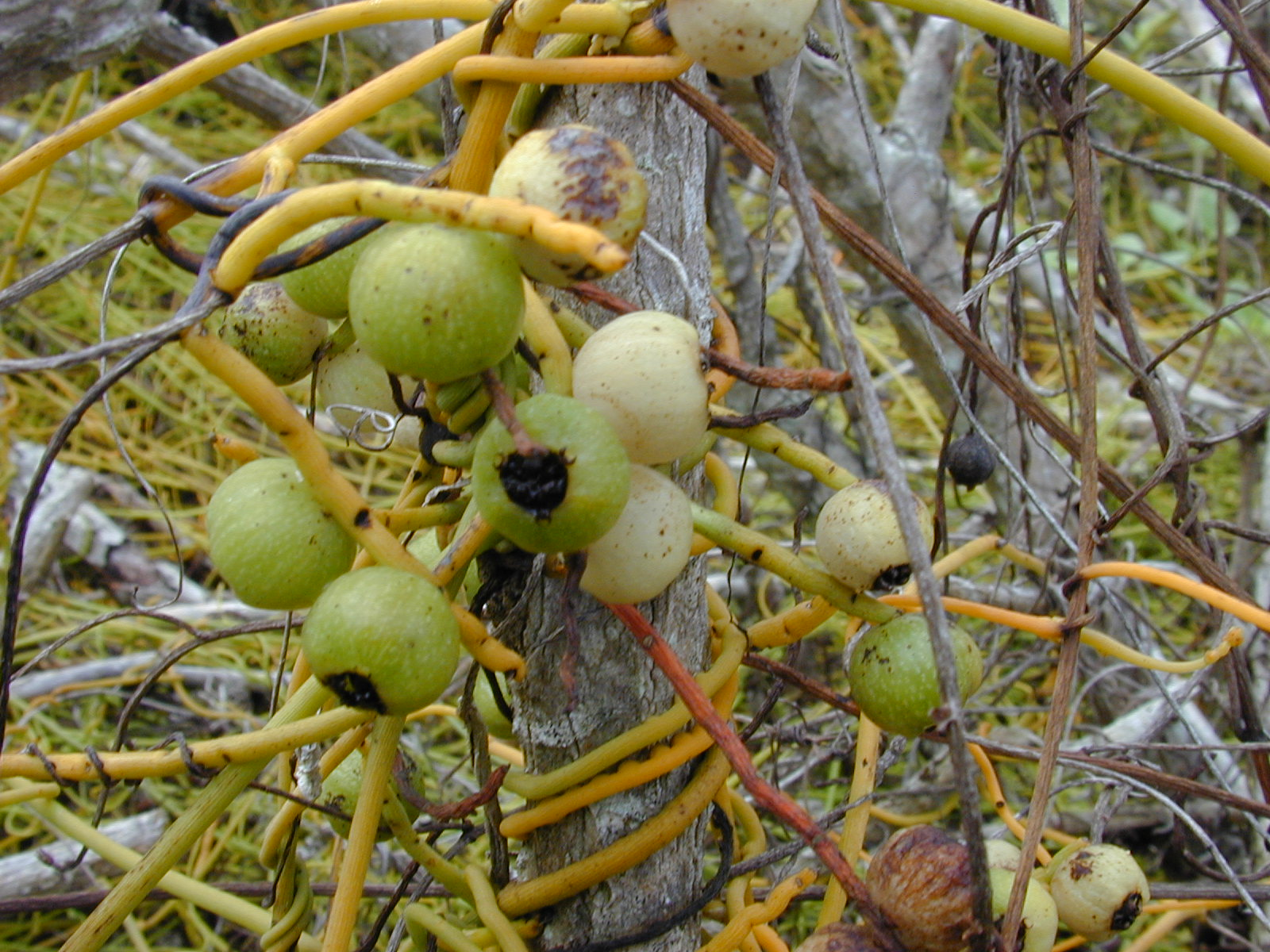
Fideillo
(Cassytha filiformis)

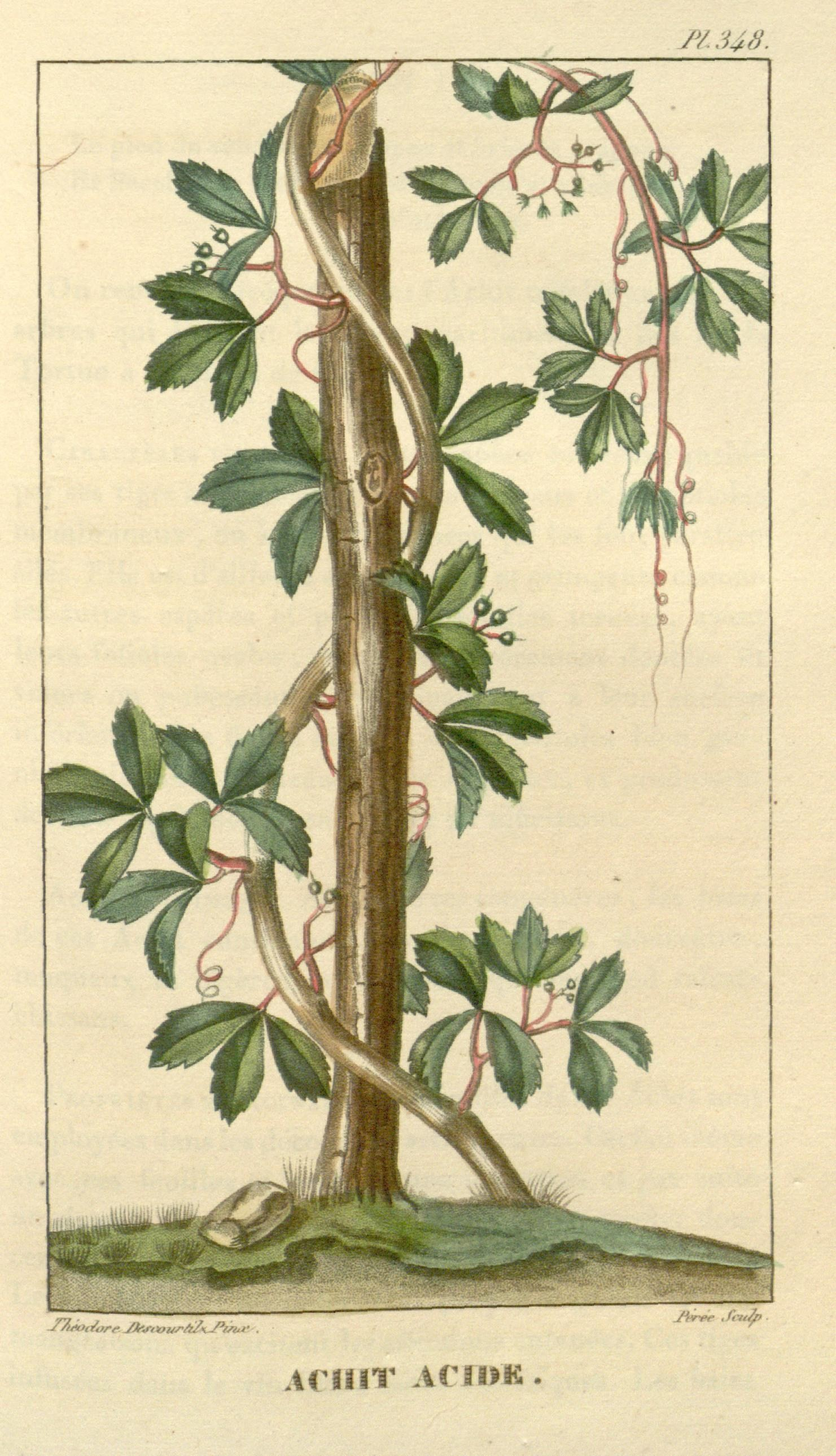
Bejuco de caro
(Cissus trifoliata)

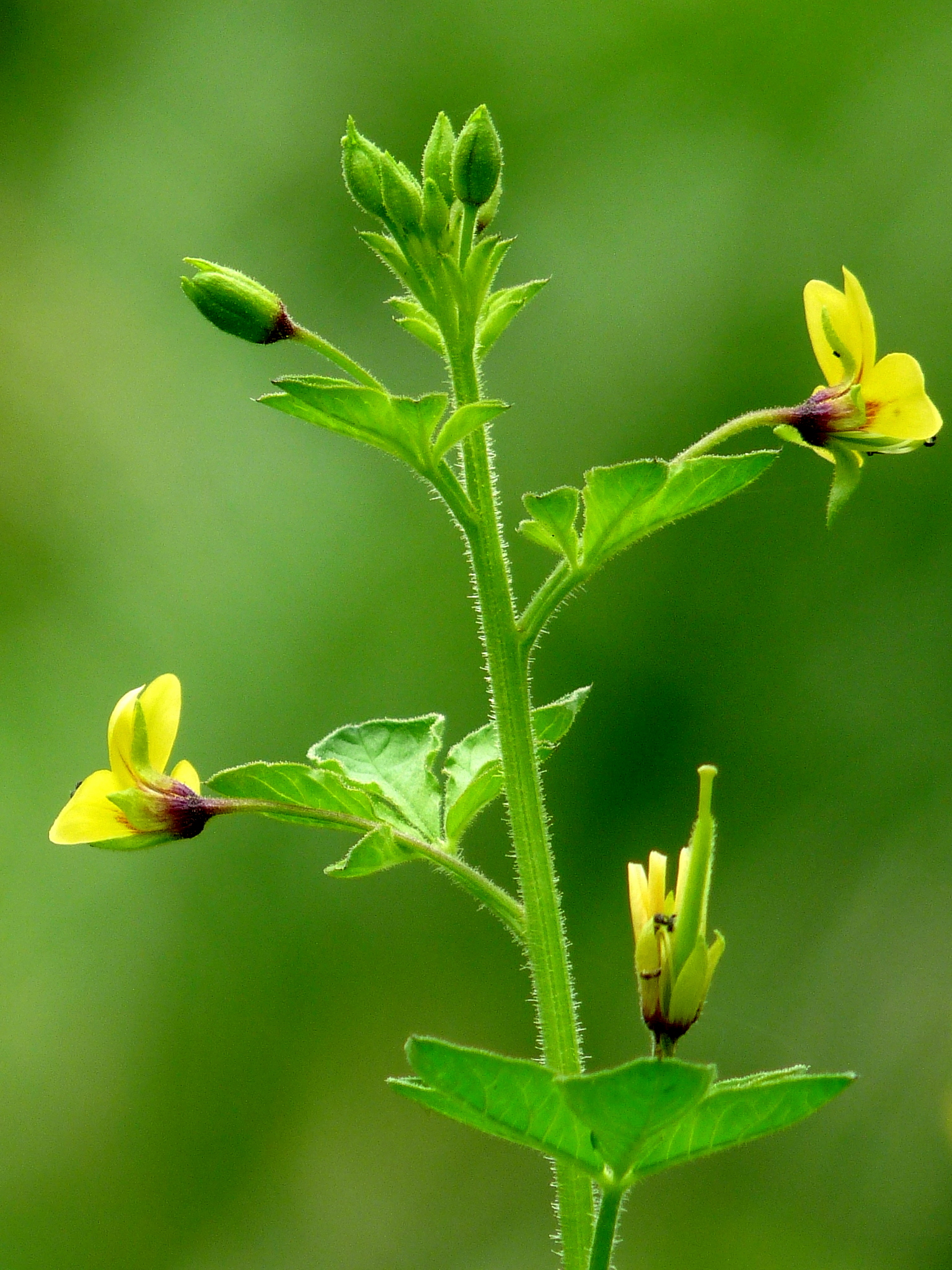
Volantín
(Cleome viscosa)

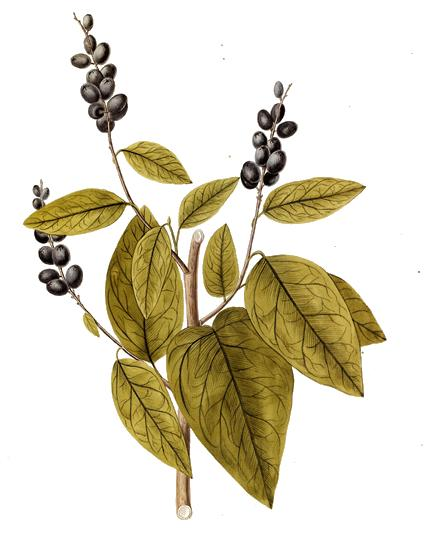
Uvilla
(Coccoloba diversifolia)

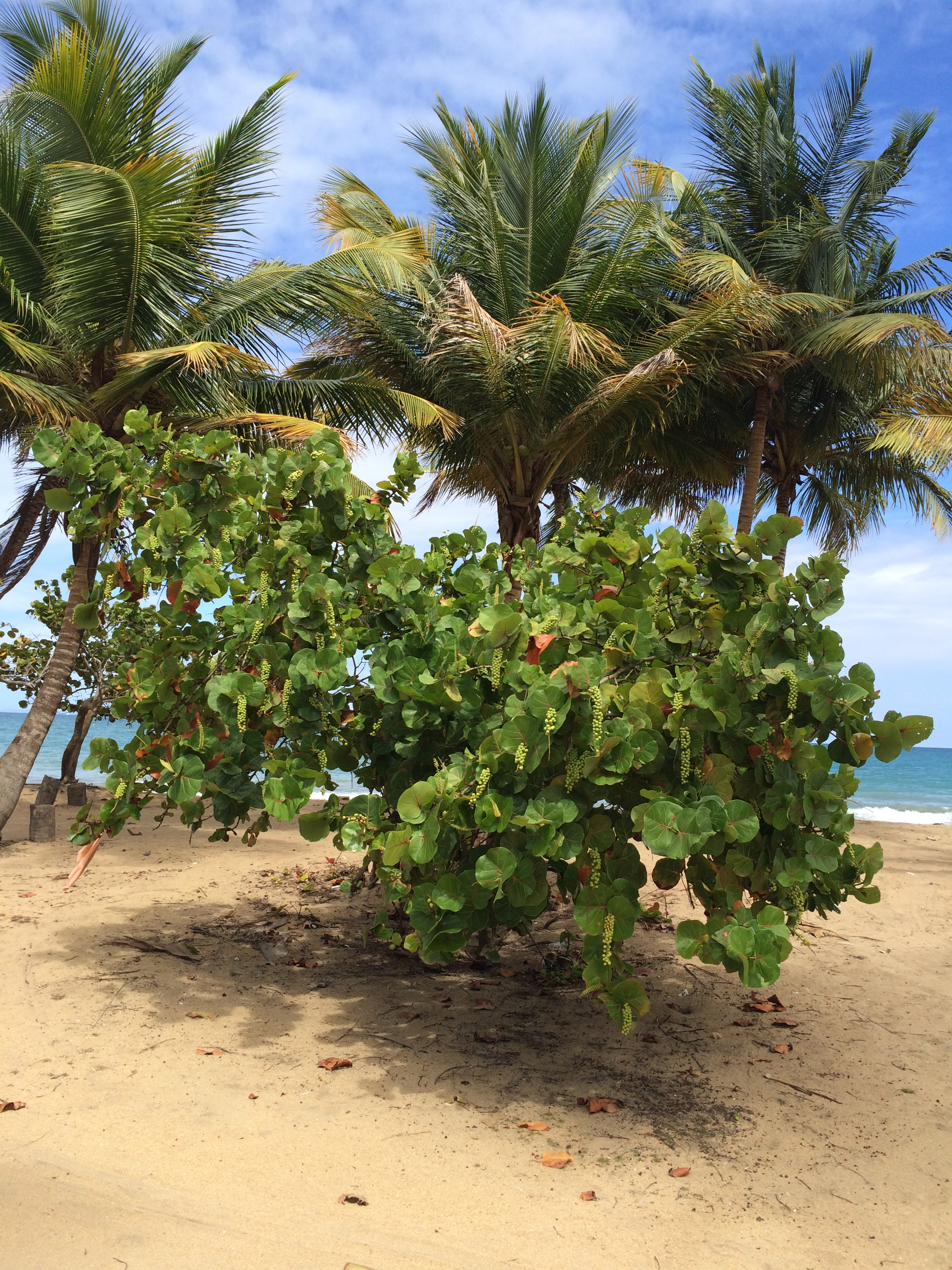
Uva de playa
(Coccoloba uvifera)

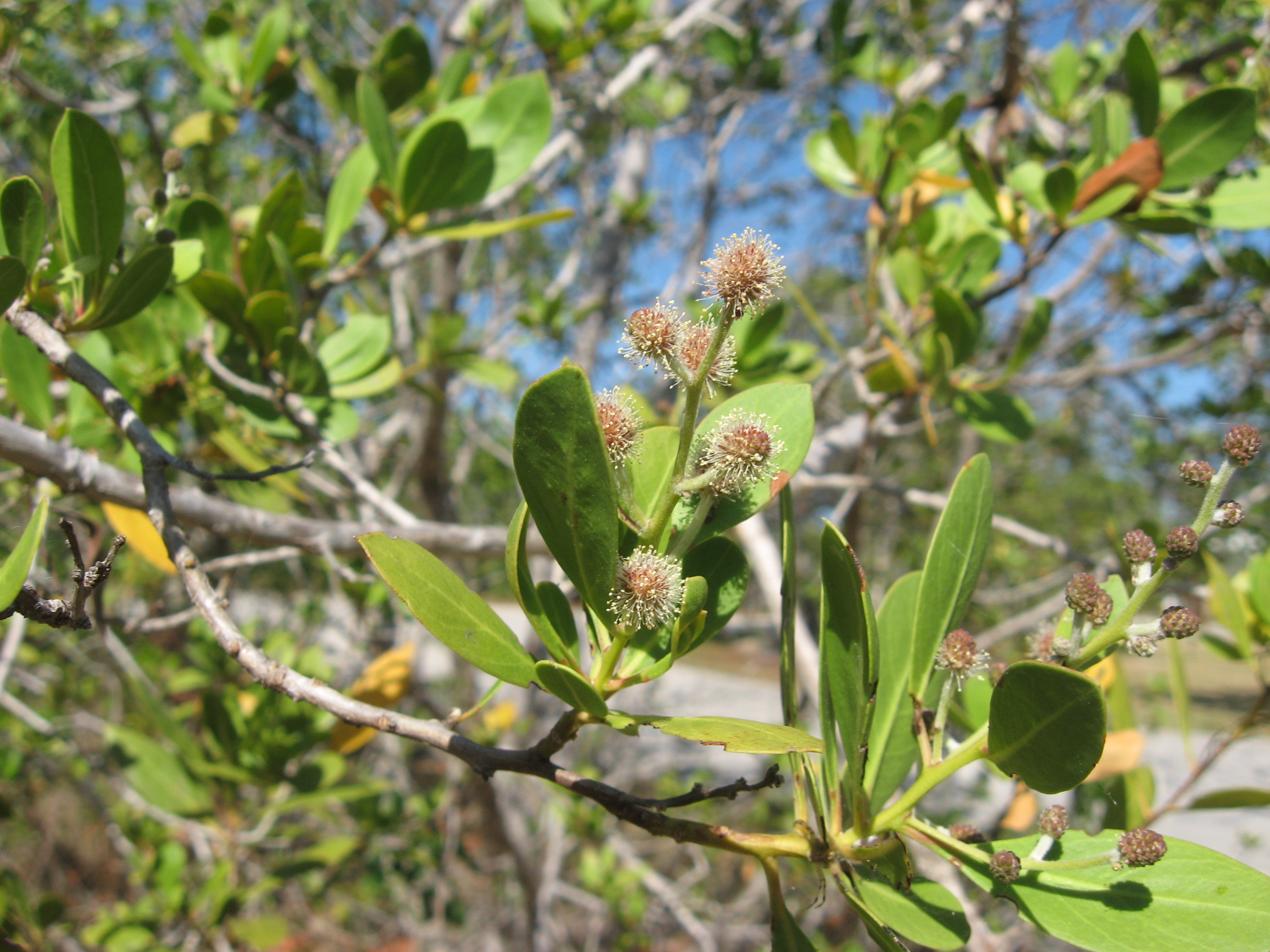
Mangle blanco
(Conocarpus erectus)

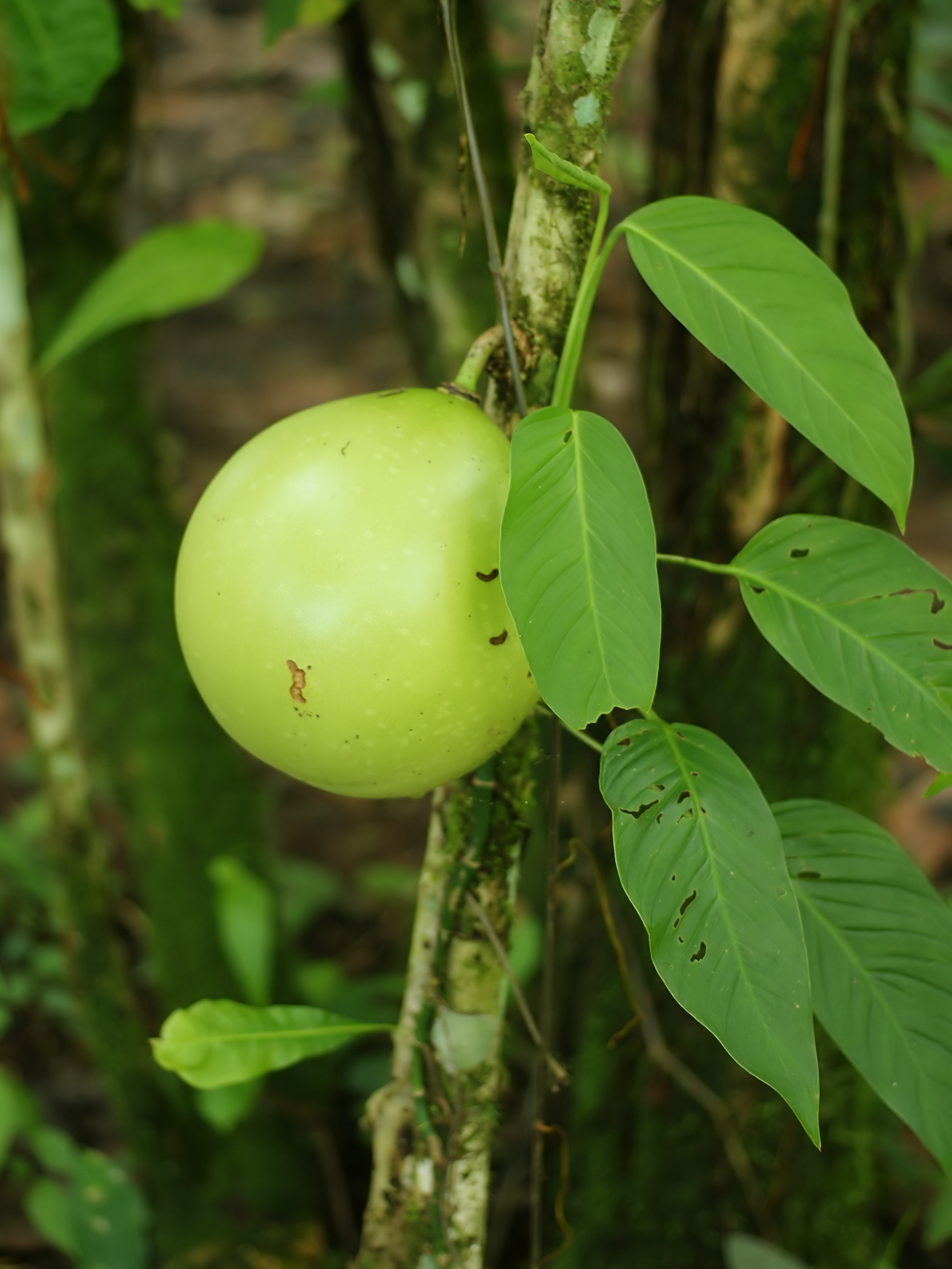
Higüera
(Crescentia cujete)

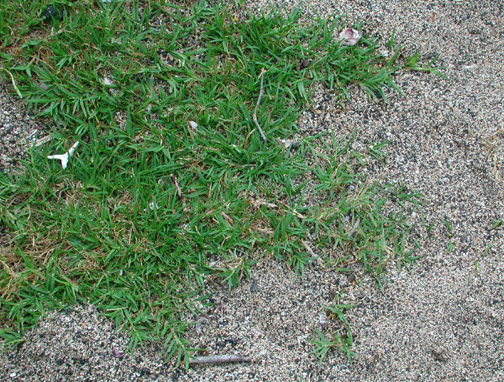
Yerba Bermuda
(Cynodon dactylon)

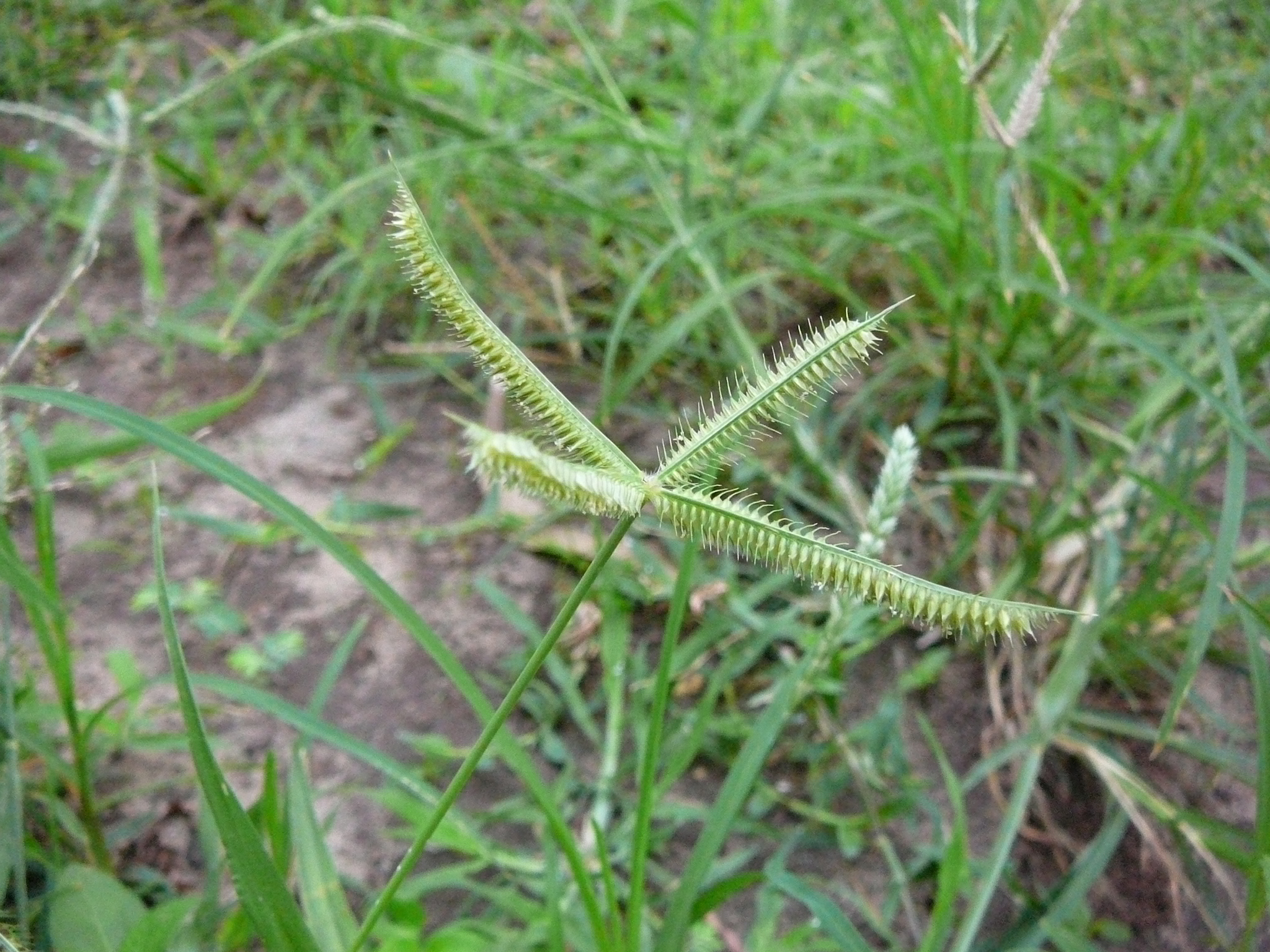
Yerba egipcia
(Dactyloctenium aegyptium)

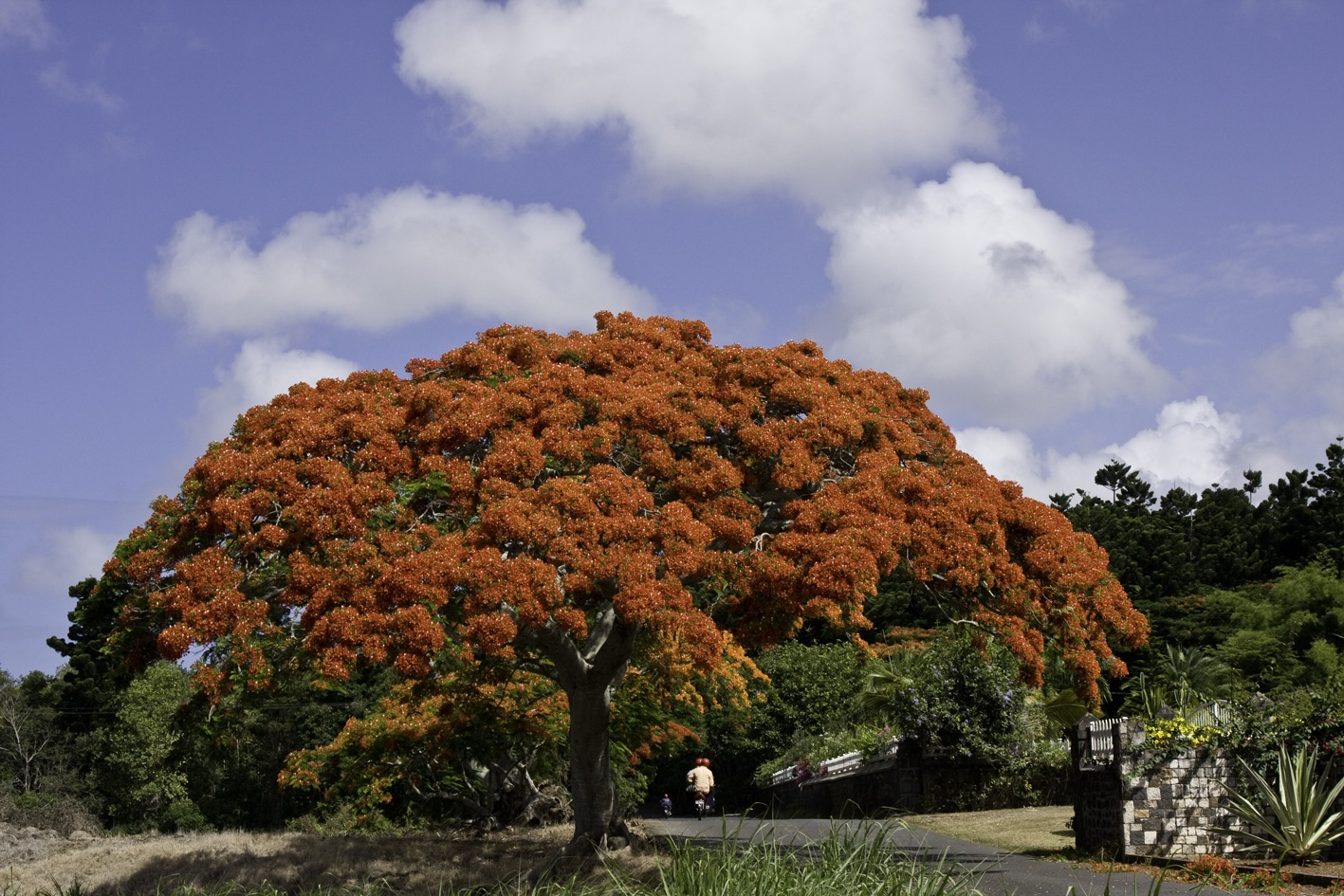
Flamboyán
(Delonix regia)

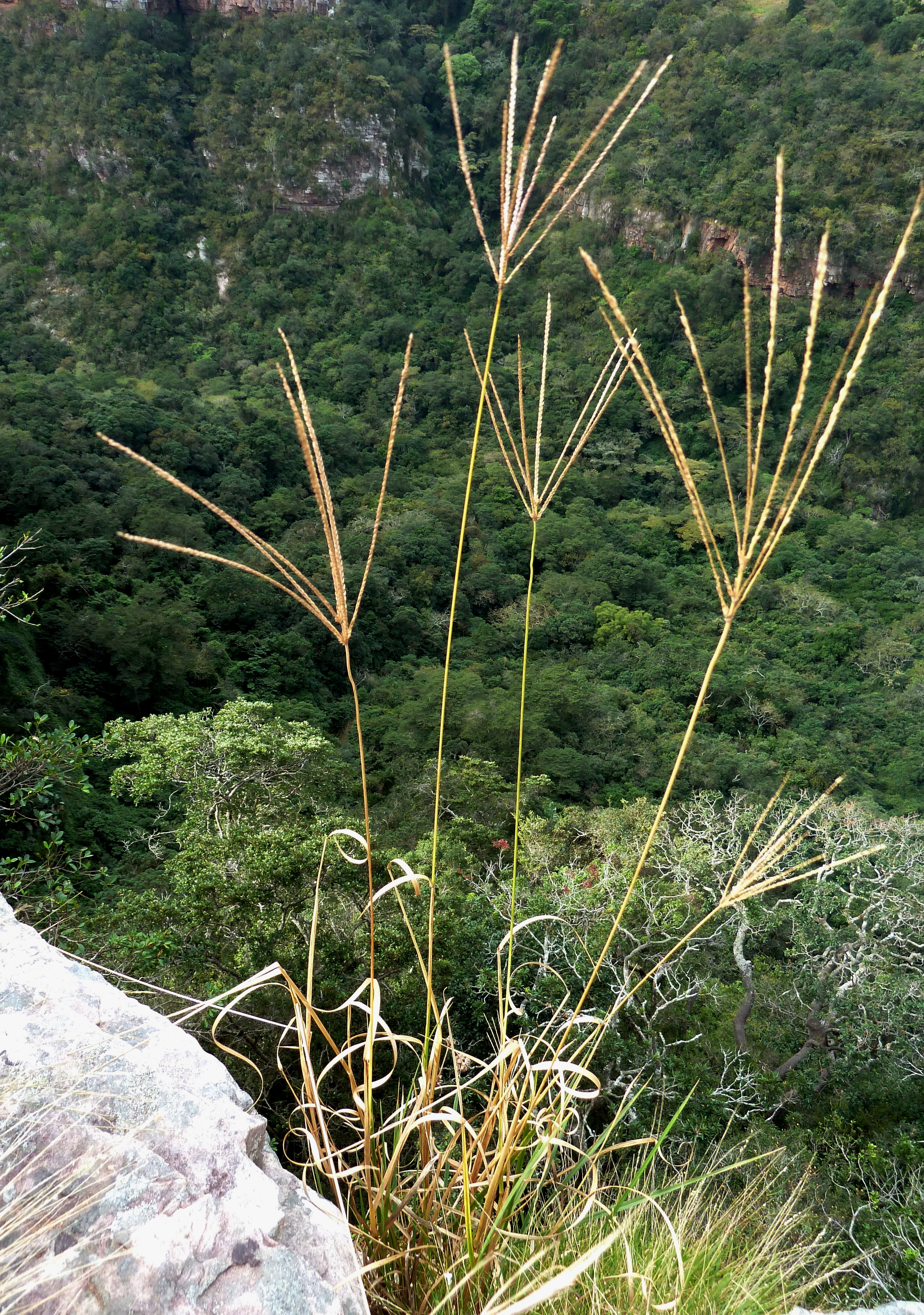
Pangola
(Digitaria decumbens)

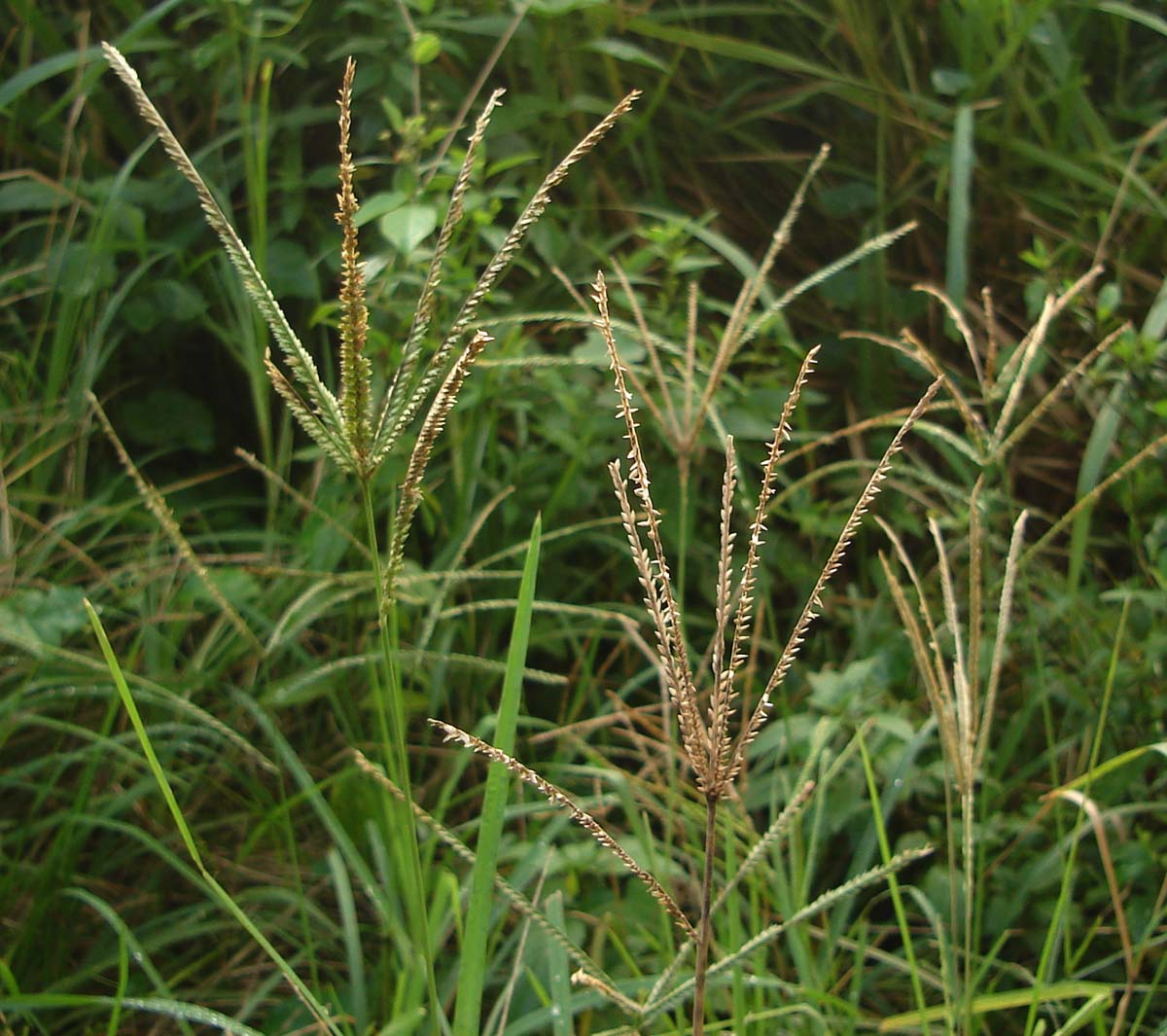
Yerba dulce
(Eleusine indica)

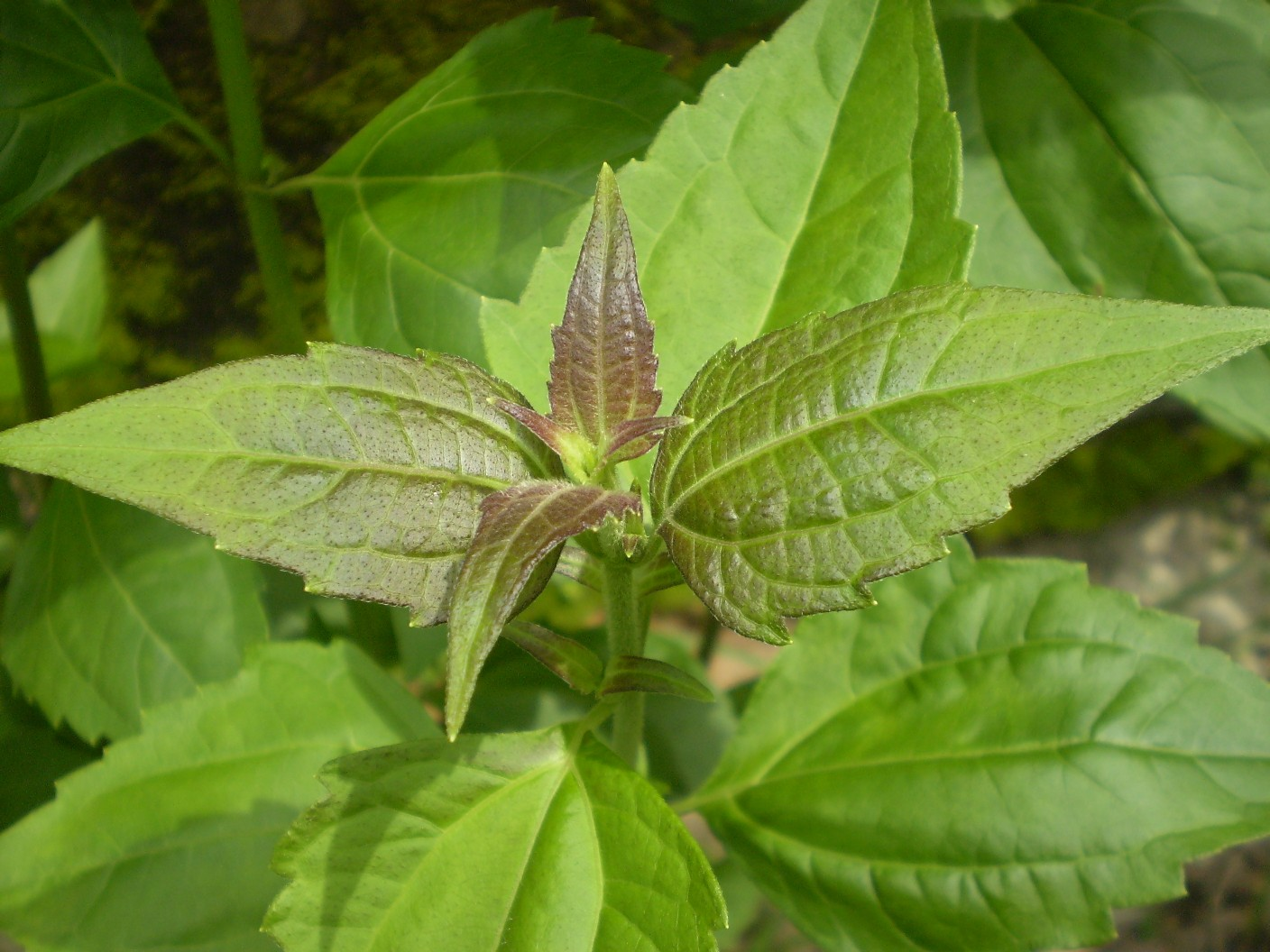
Cariaquillo santa maría
(Eupatorium odoratum)

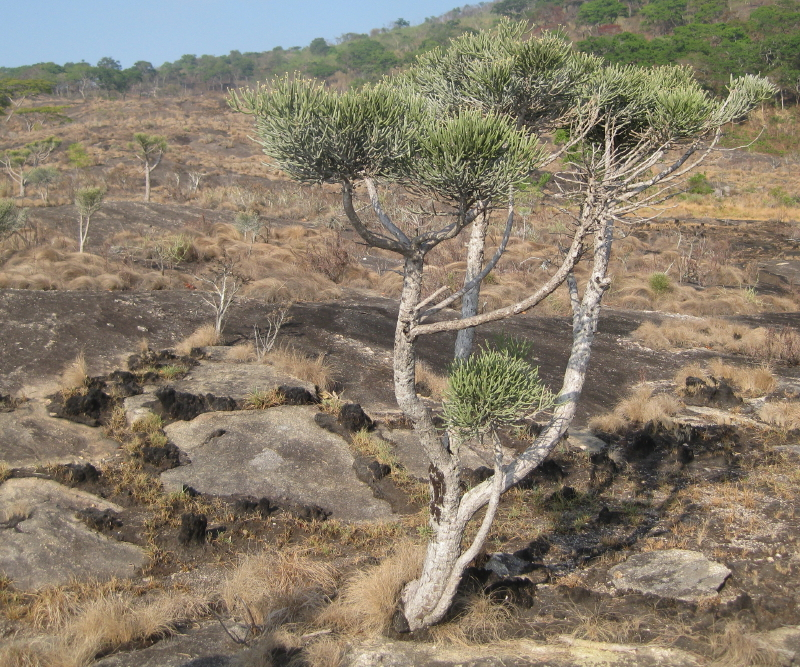
Esqueleto
(Eupatorium odoratum)

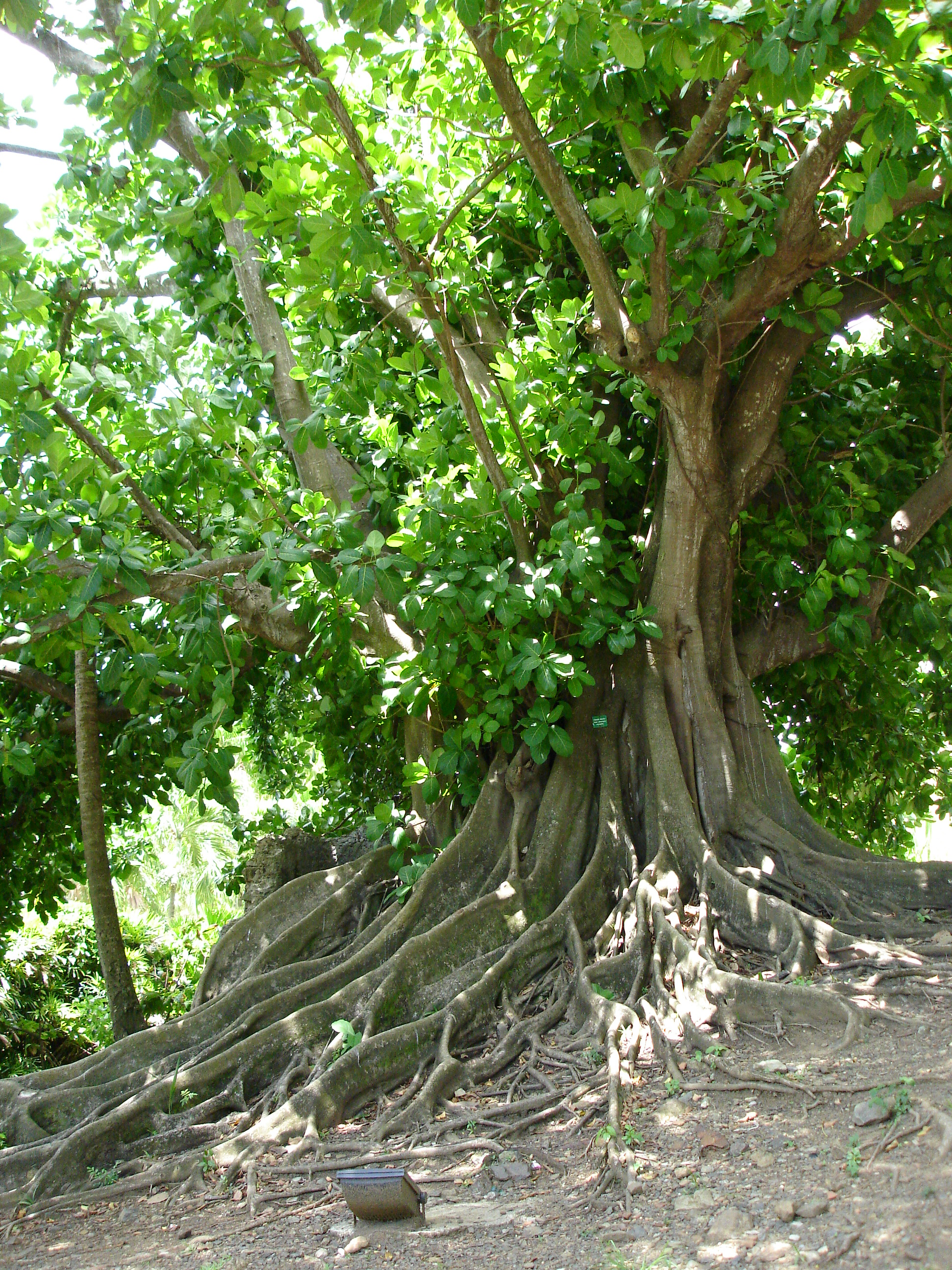
Jagüey
(Ficus citrifolia)

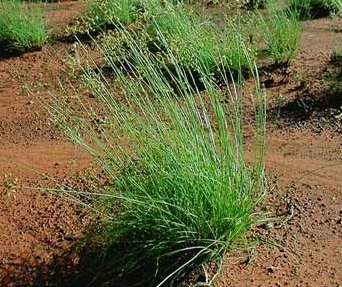
Junquito
(Fimbristylis dichotoma)

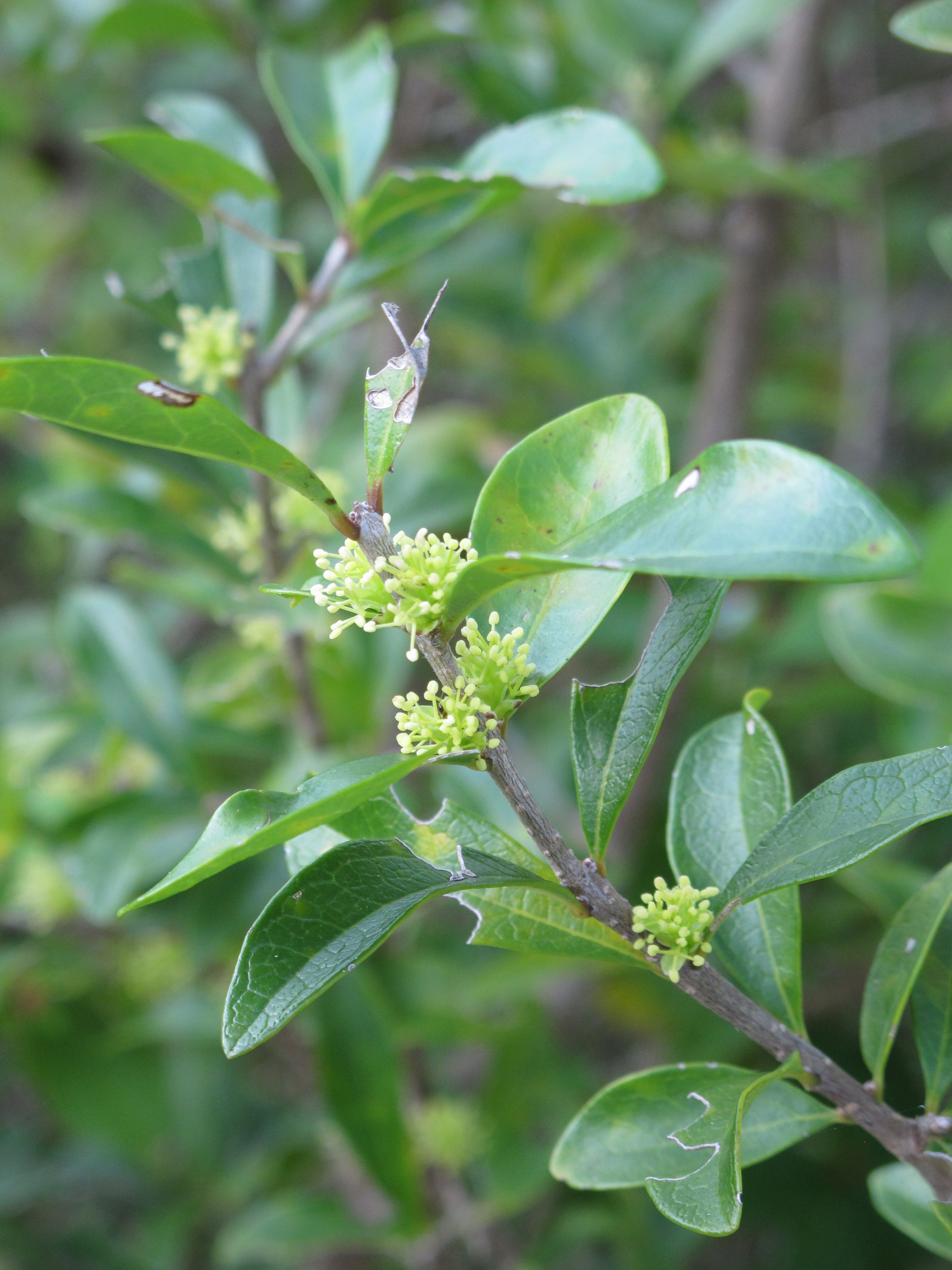
Privet (ink-bush)
(Forestiera segregata)

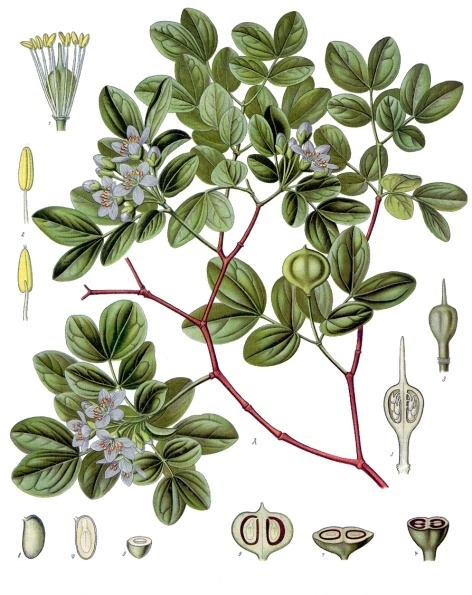
Guayacan
(Guaiacum officinale)

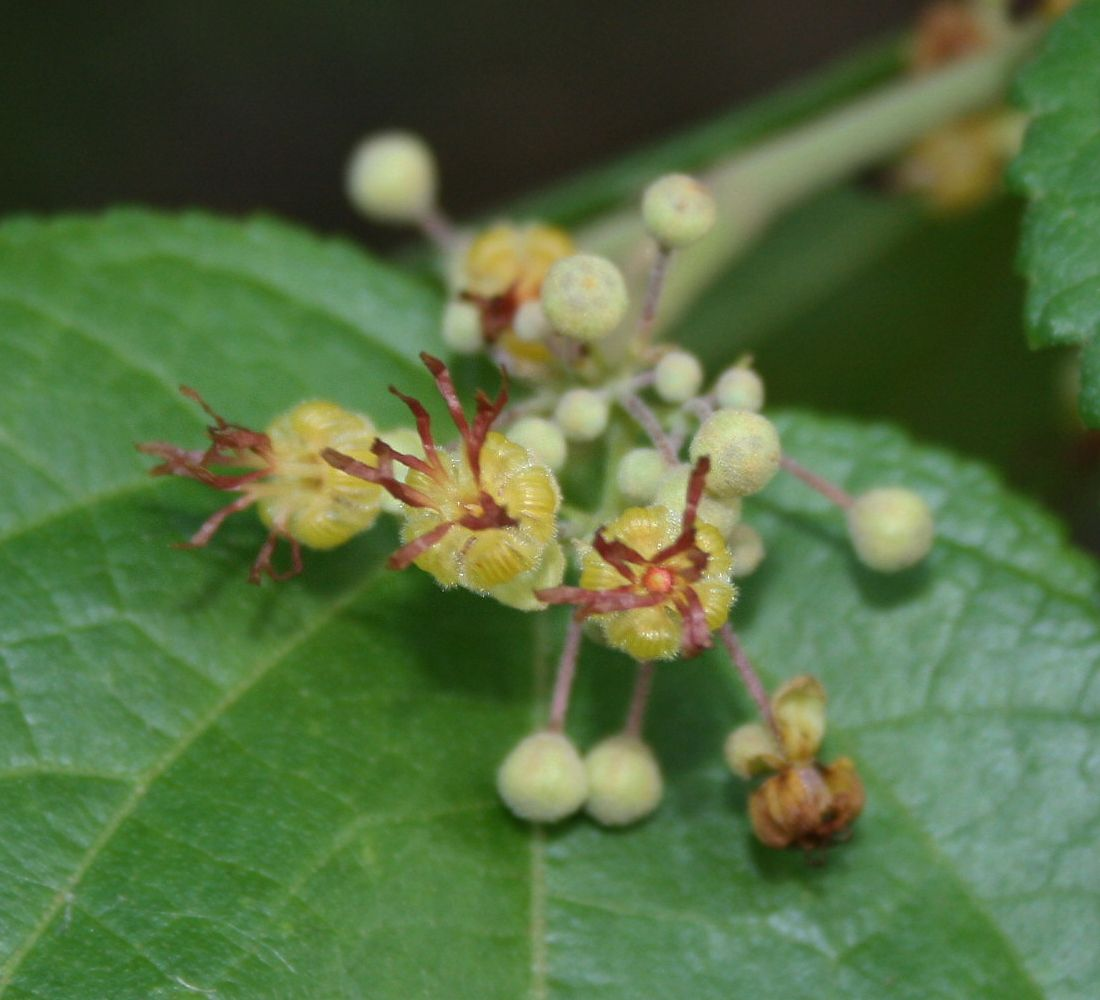
Guácima
(Guazuma ulmifolia)

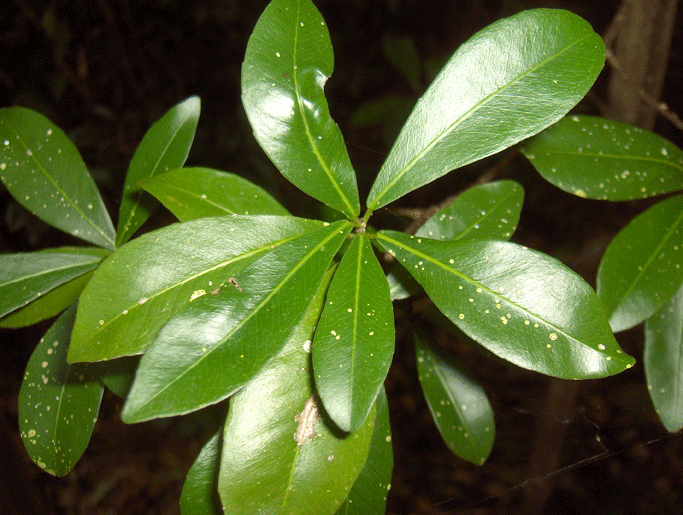
Yaití
(Gymnanthes lucida)

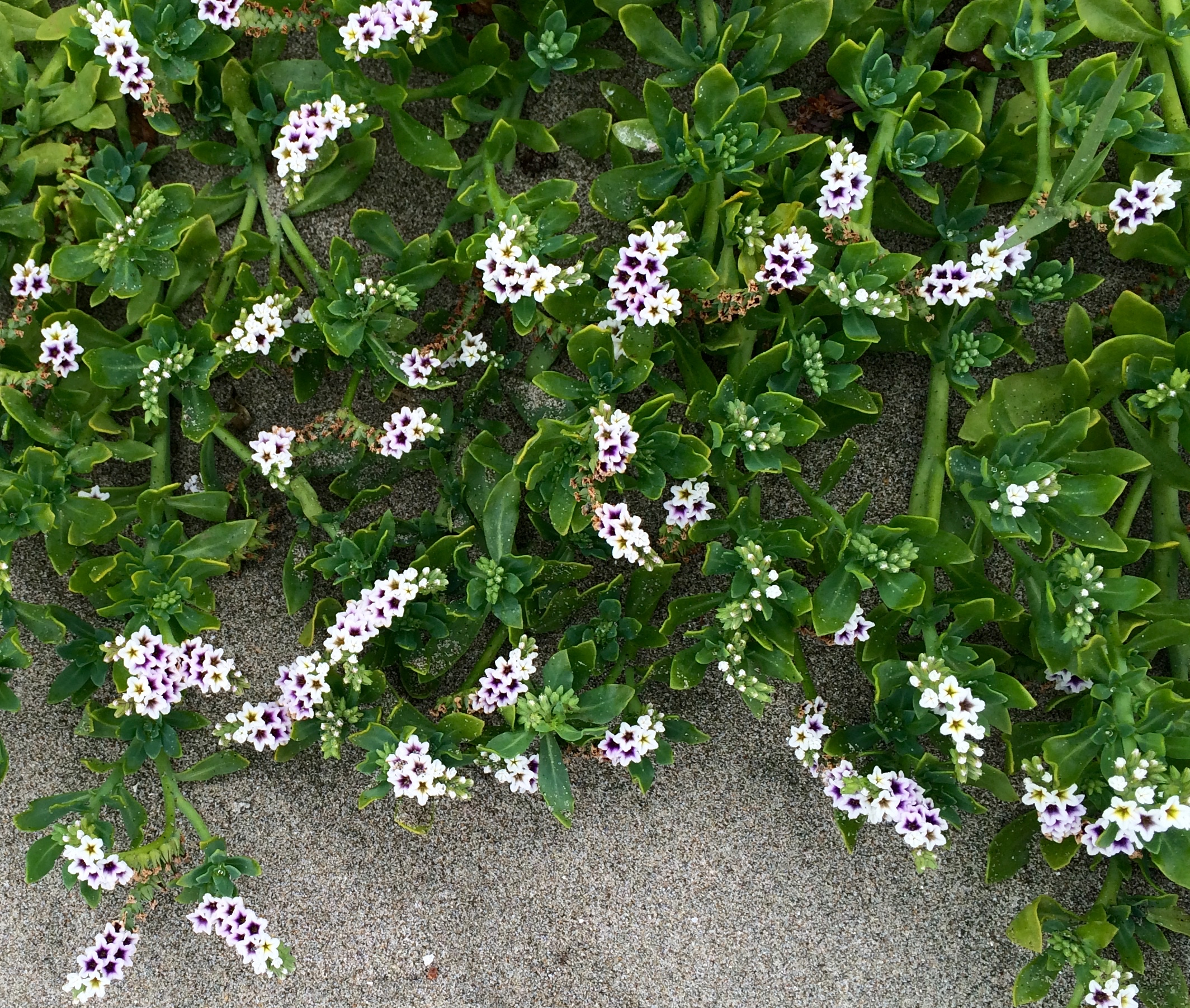
Cotorrera de playa
(Heliotropium curassavicum)

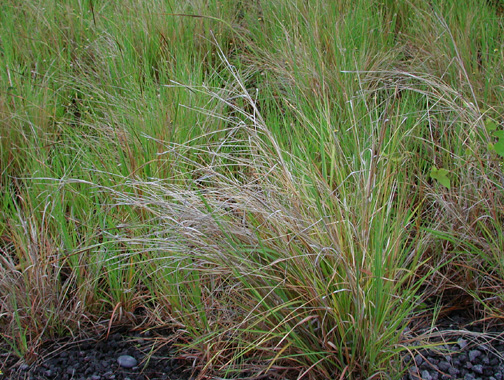
Yerba torcida
(Heteropogon contortus)

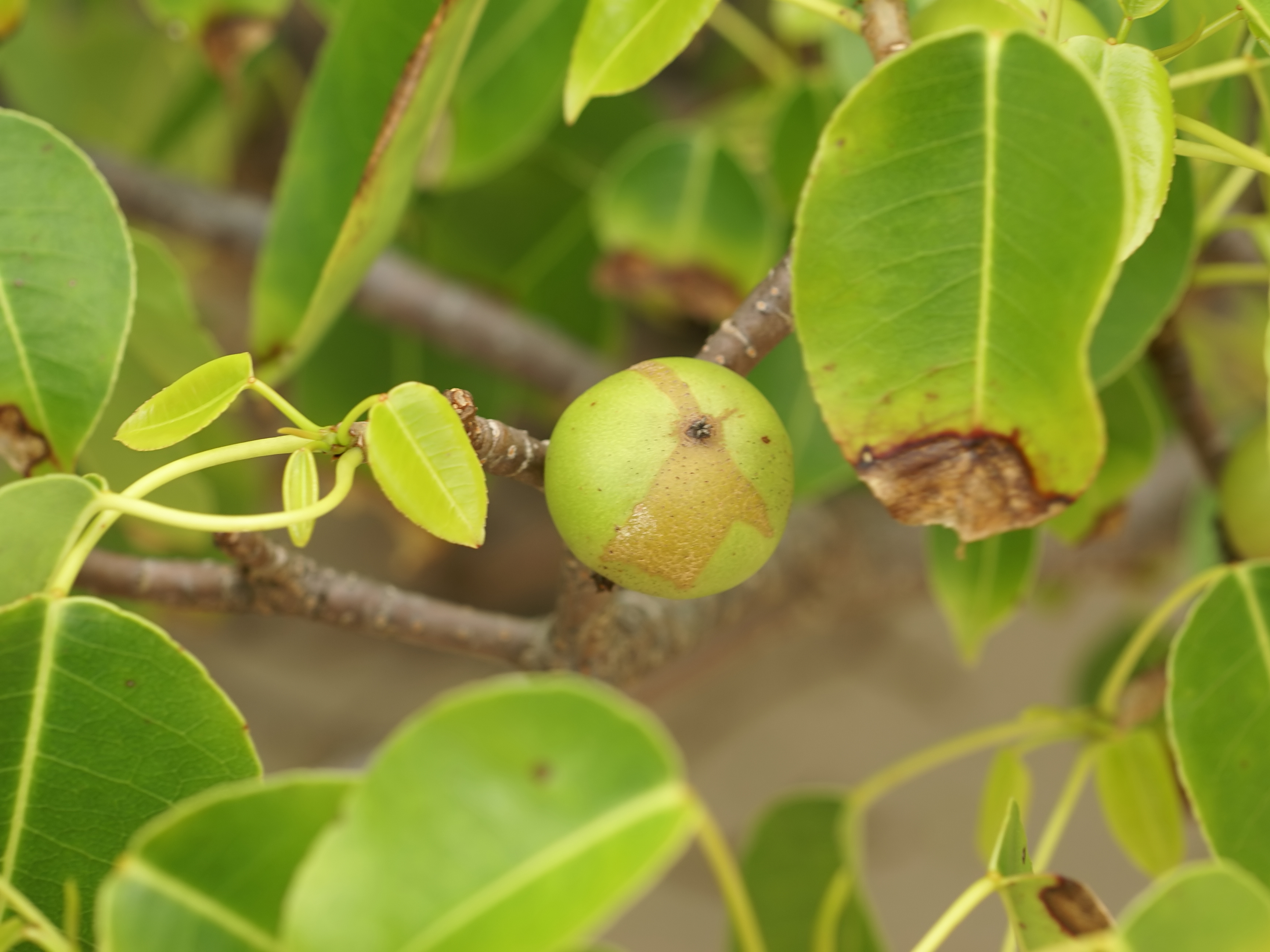
Manzanillo
(Hippomane mancinella)

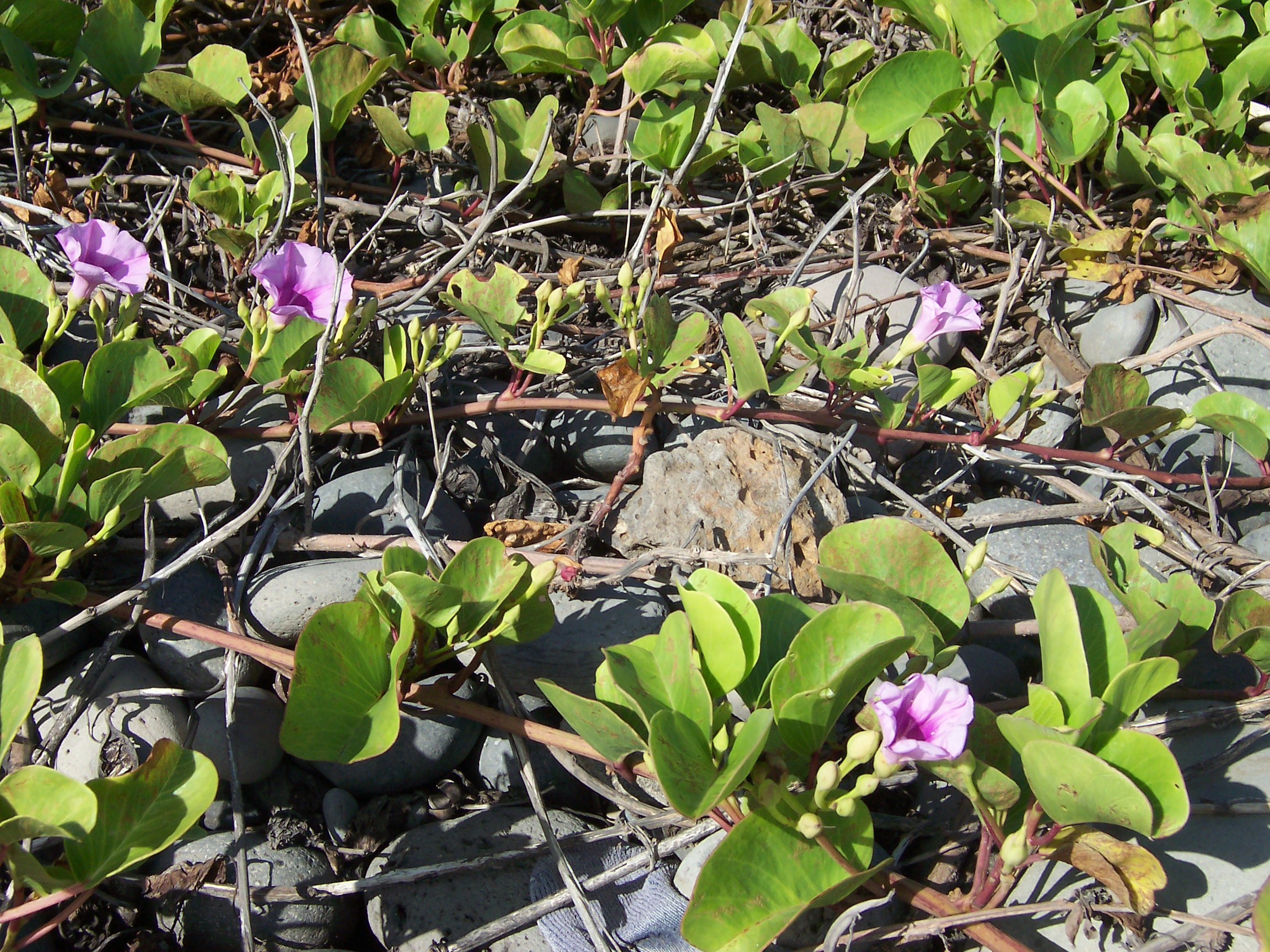
Bejuco de playa
(Ipomoea pes-caprae)

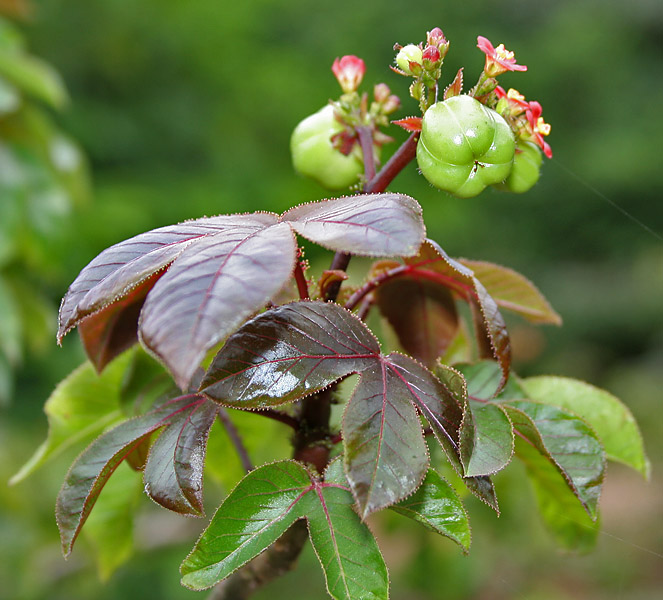
Túa-túa
(Jatropha gossypiifolia)

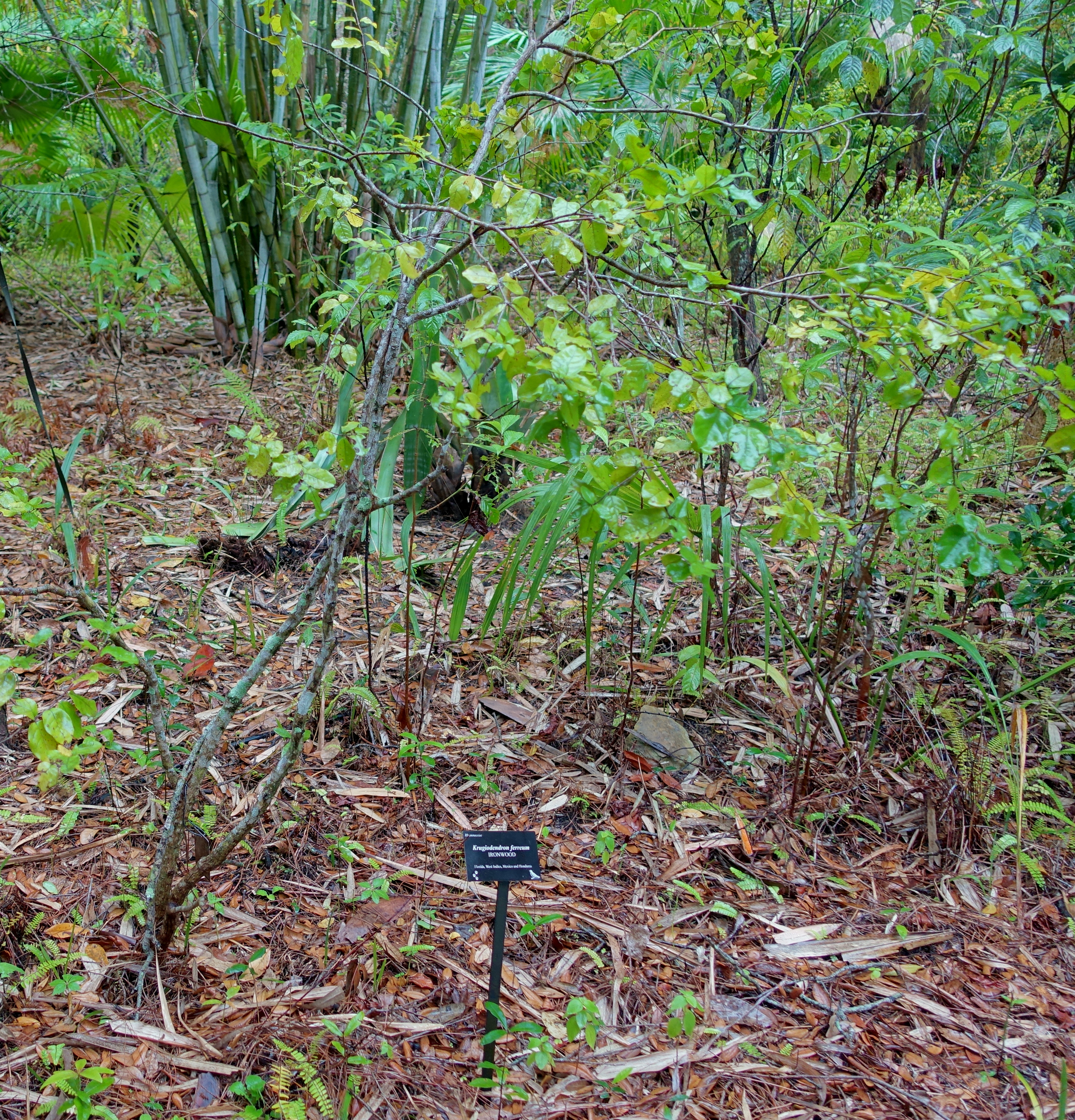
Bariaco
(Krugiodendron ferreum)

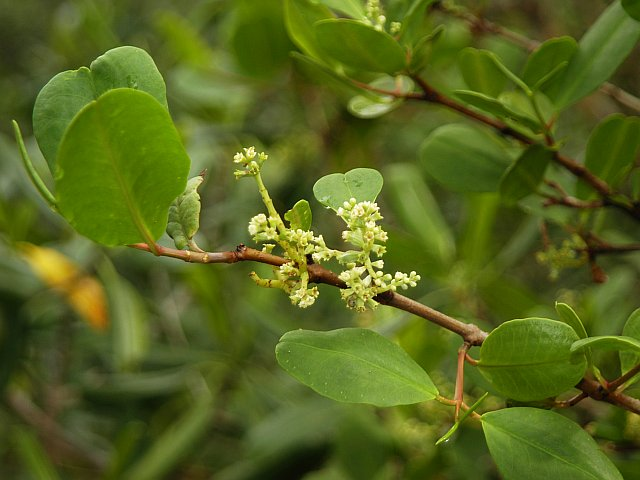
Mangle blanco
(Laguncularia racemosa)

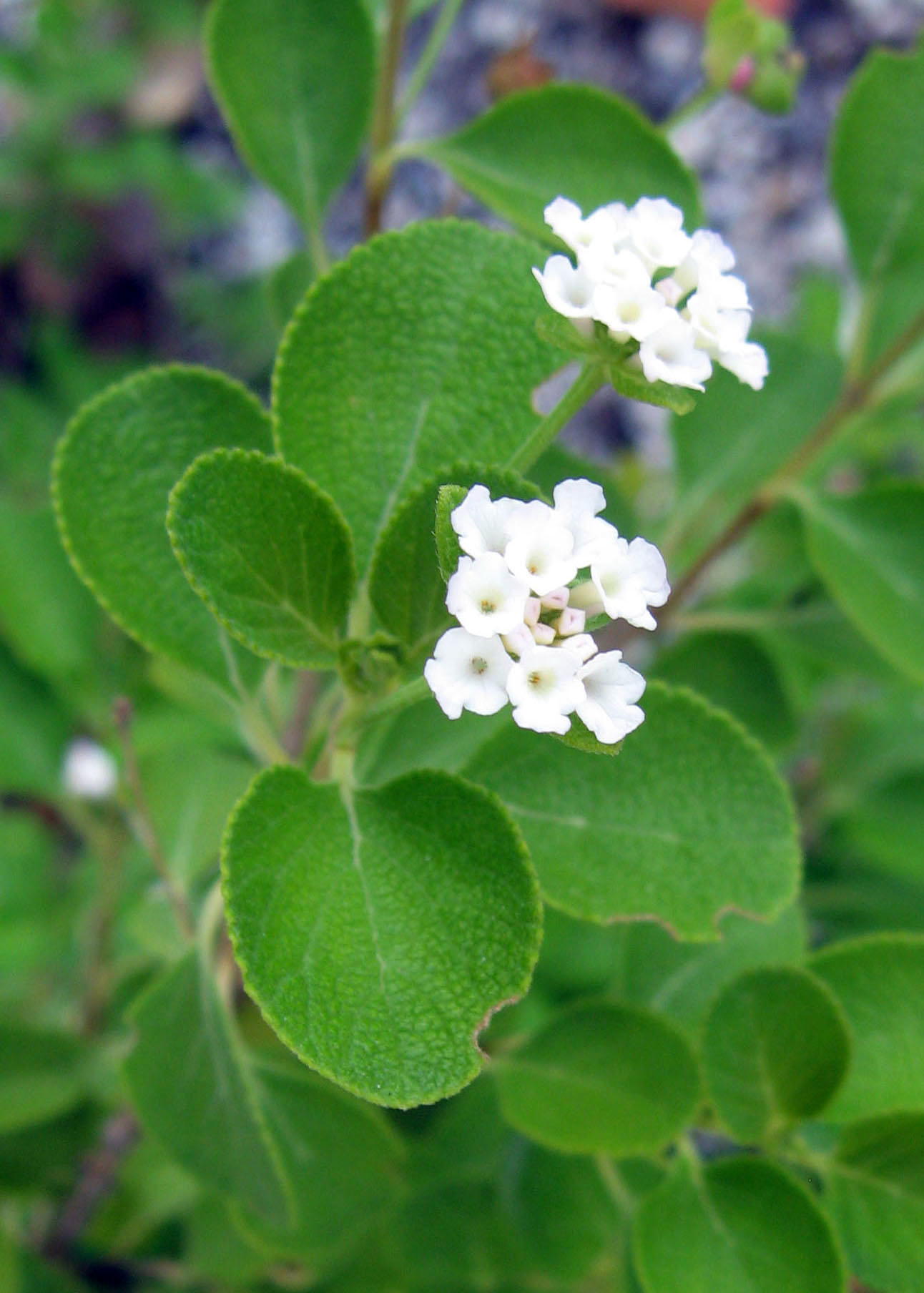
Cariaquillo
(Lantana involucrata)

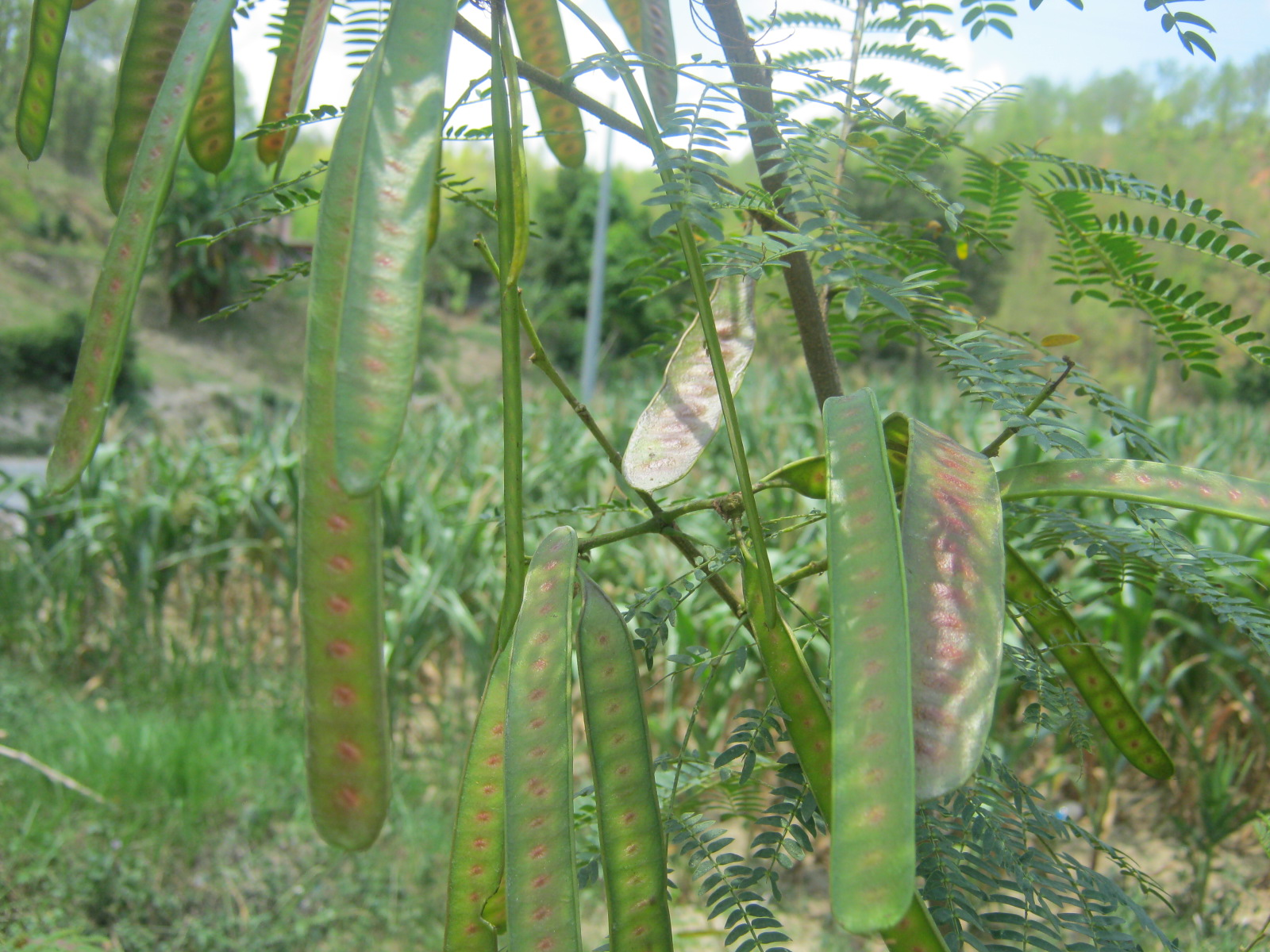
Zarzilla
(Leucaena leucocephala)

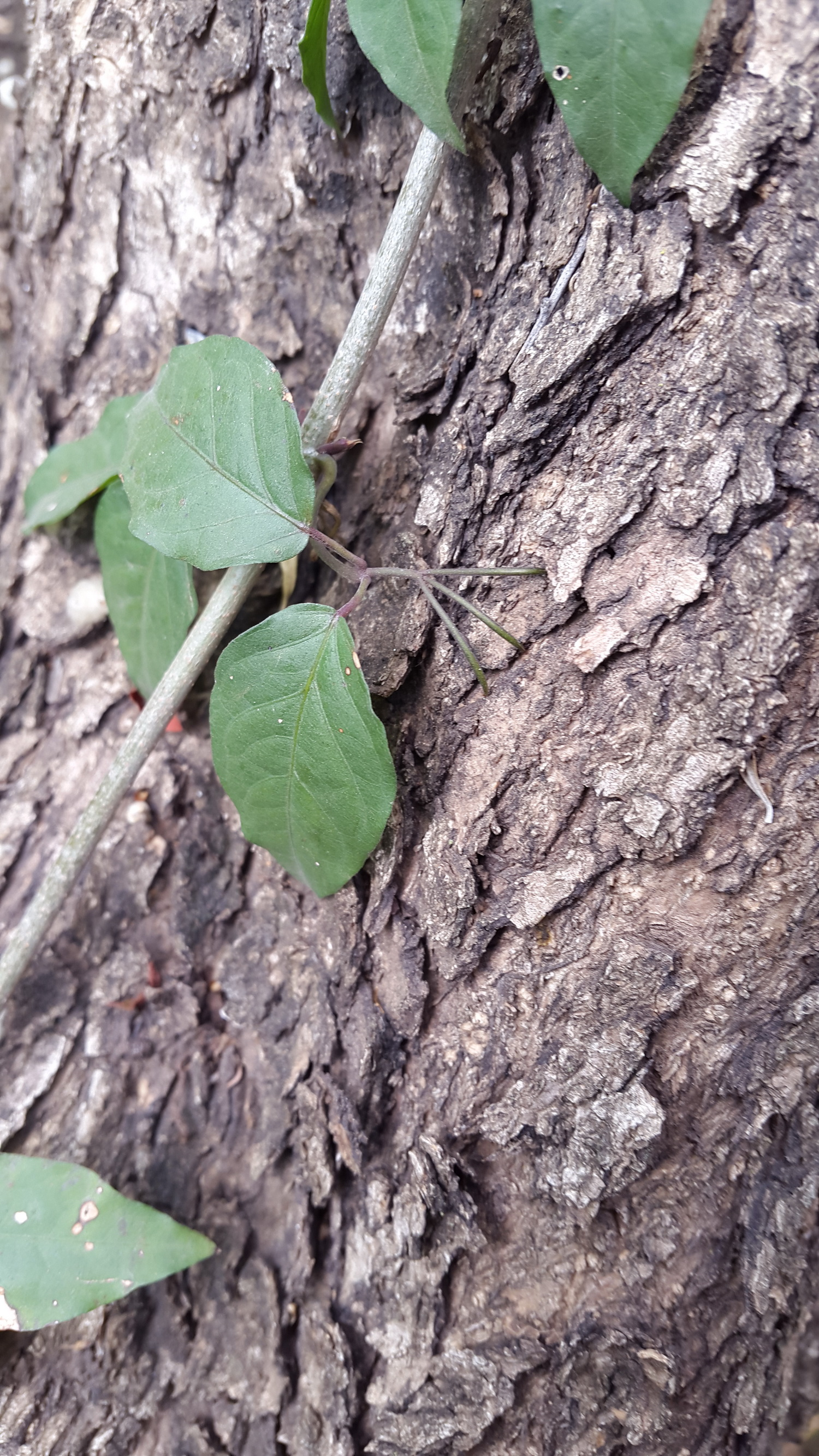
Uña de gato
(Macfadyena unguis-cati)

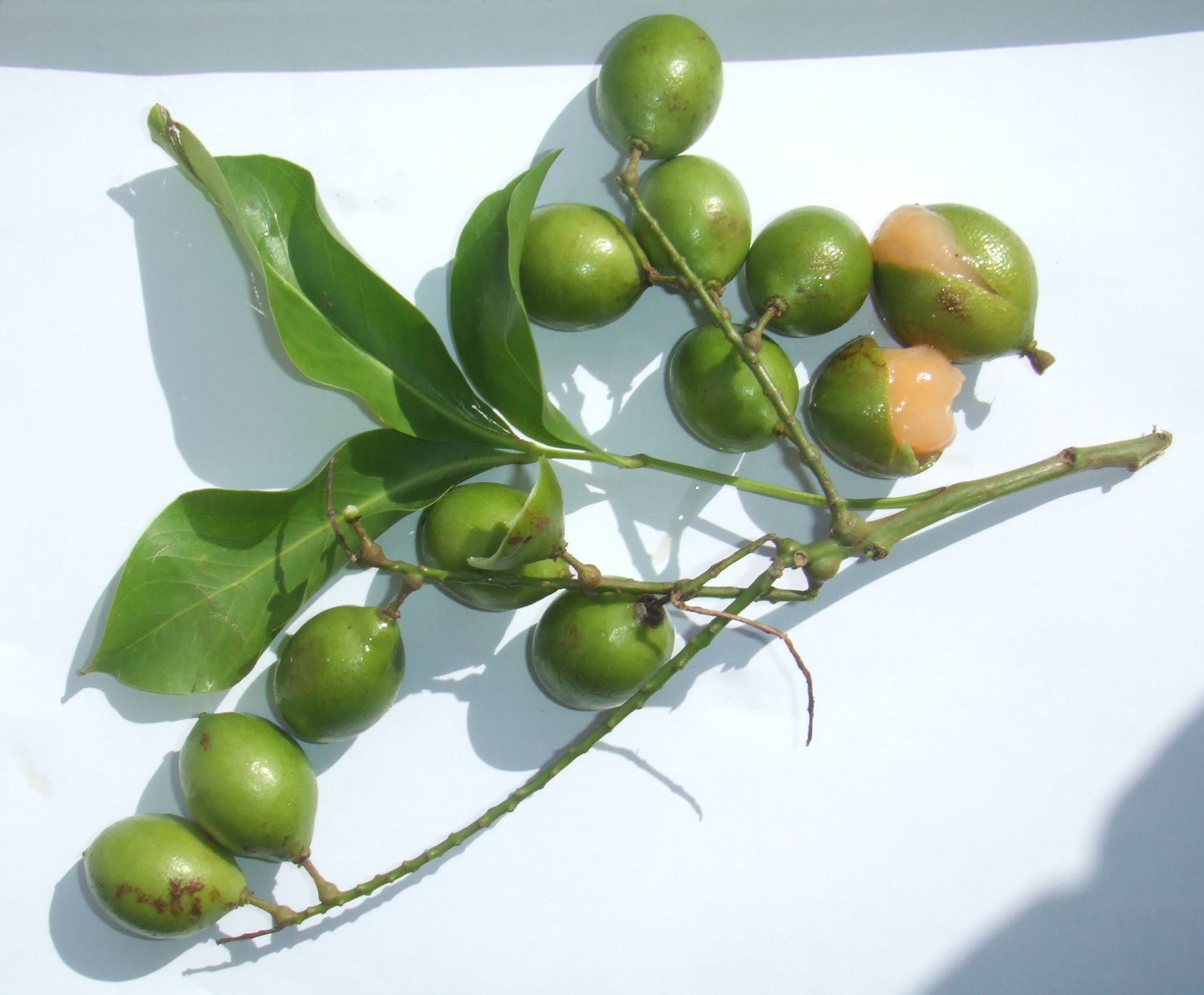
Quenepa
(Melicoccus bijugatus)

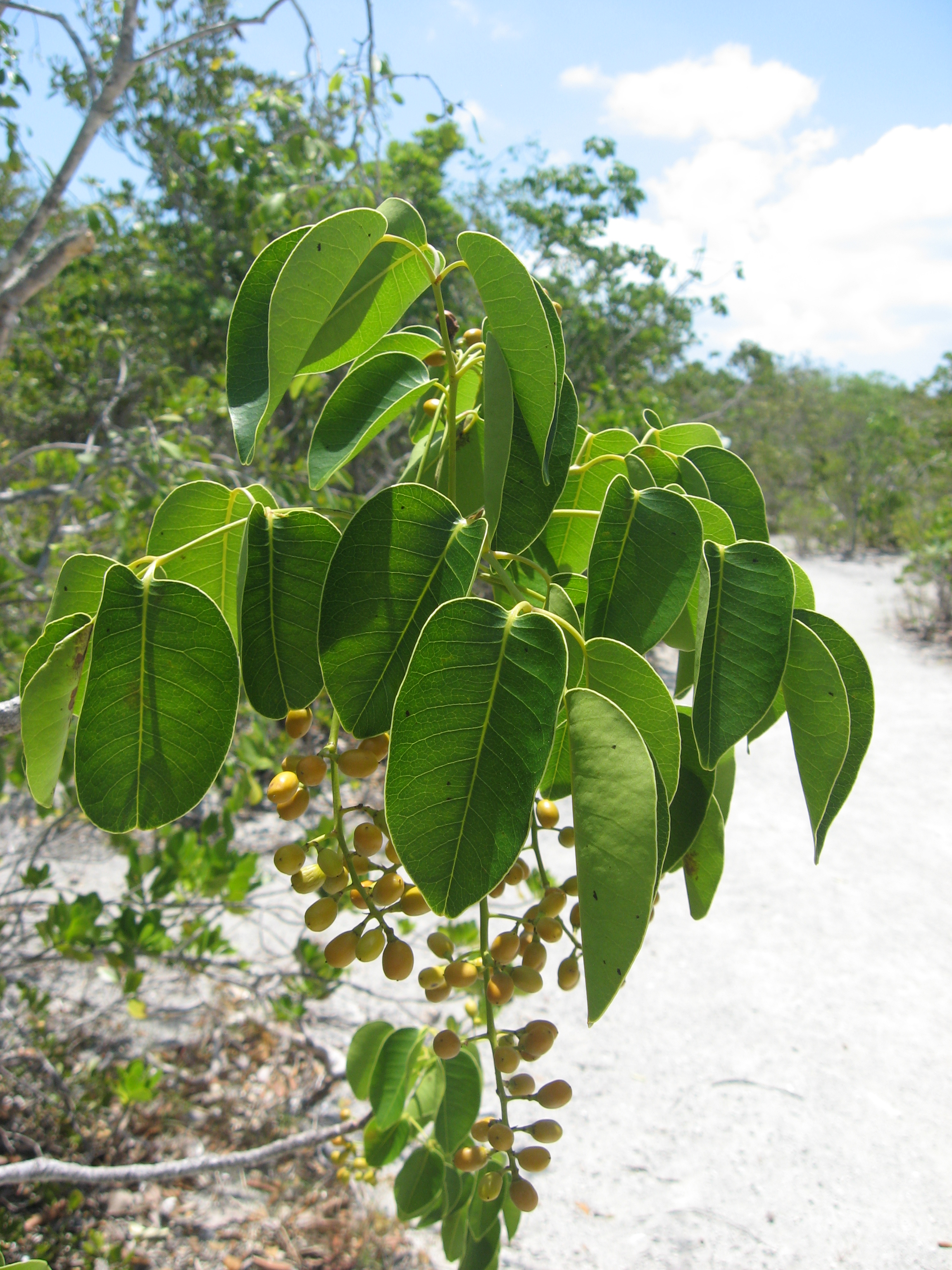
Papayo
(Metopium toxiferum)

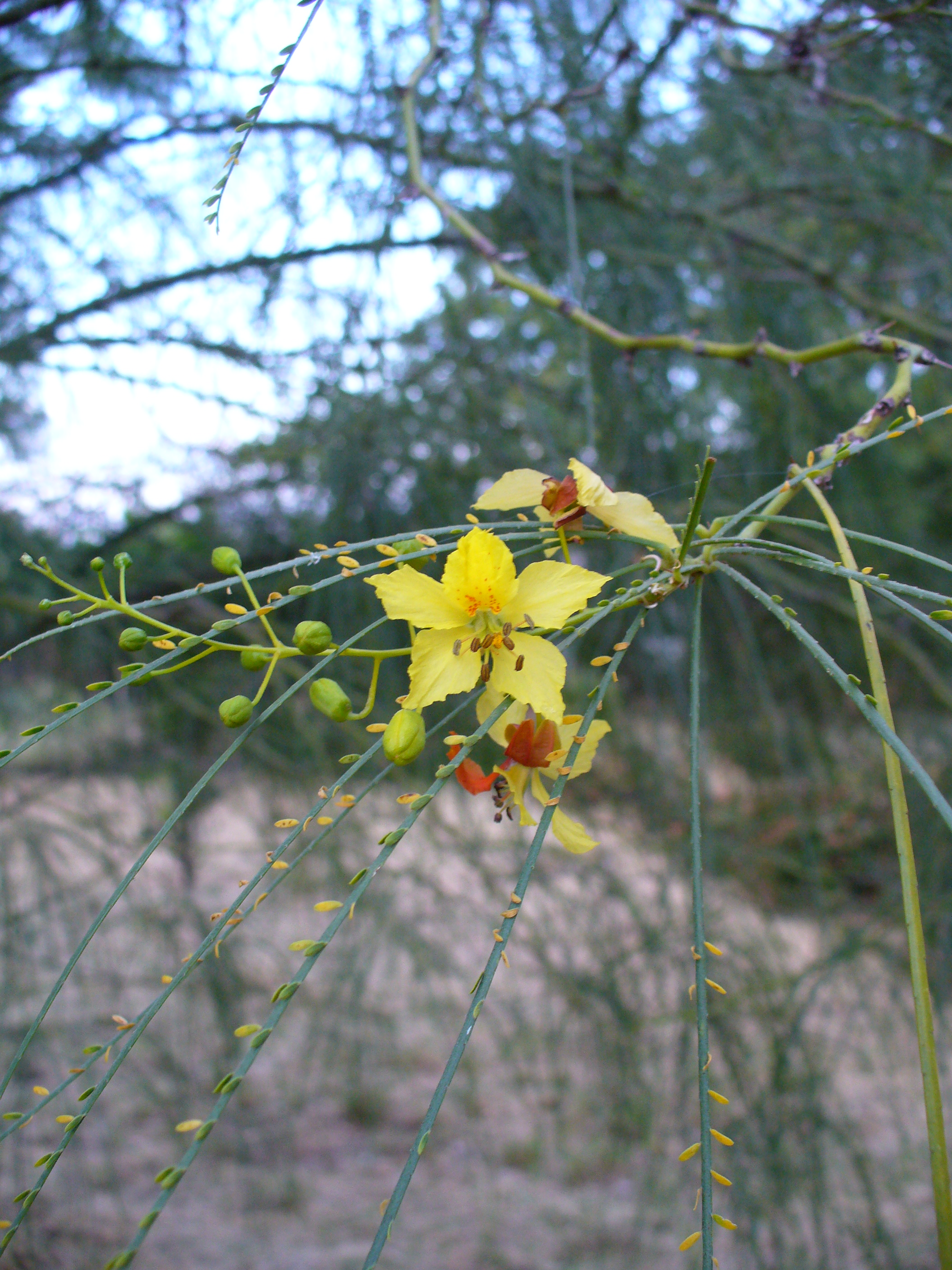
Palo de rayo
(Parkinsonia aculeata)

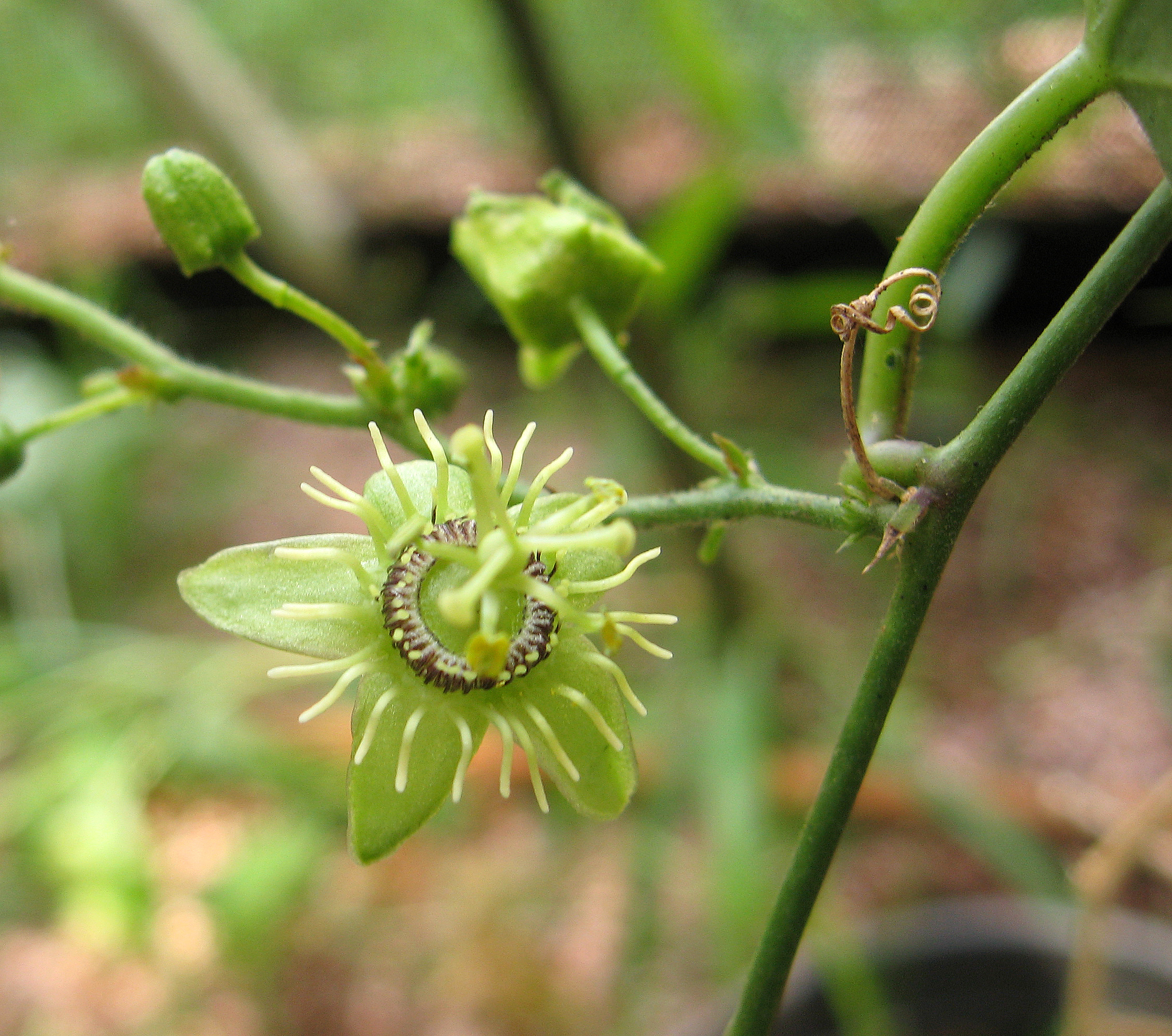
Flor de pasión
(Passiflora suberosa)

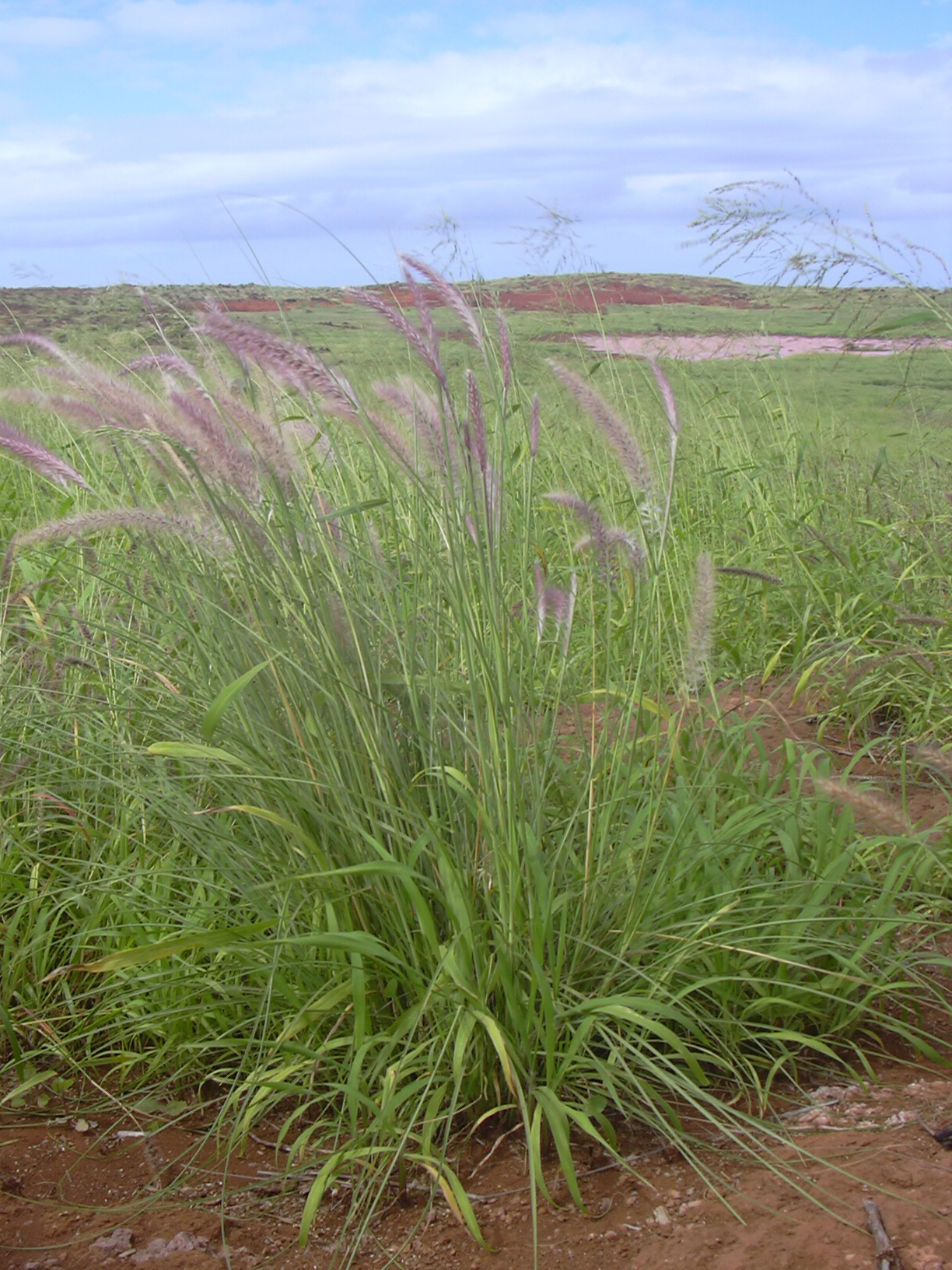
Yerba
(Pennisetum setaceum)

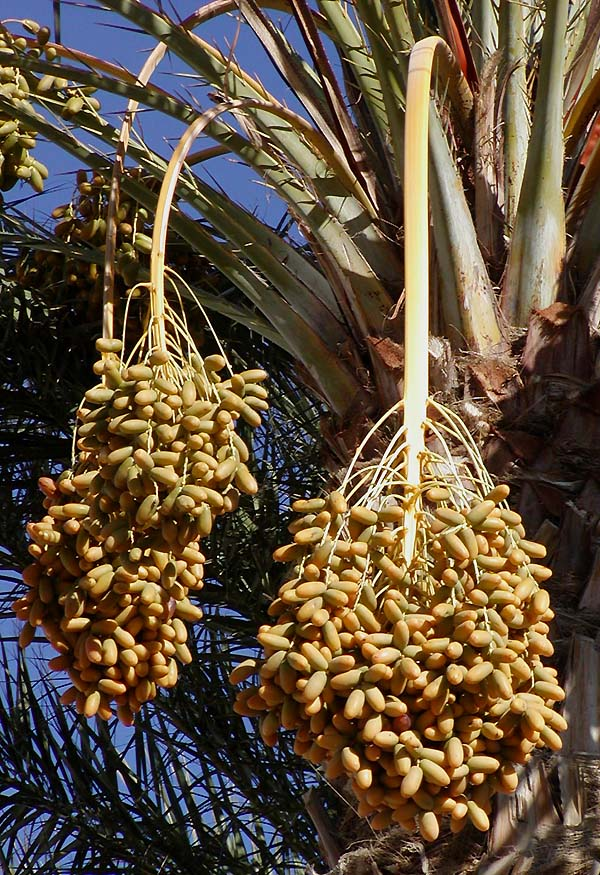
Palma de datil
(Phoenix dactylifera)

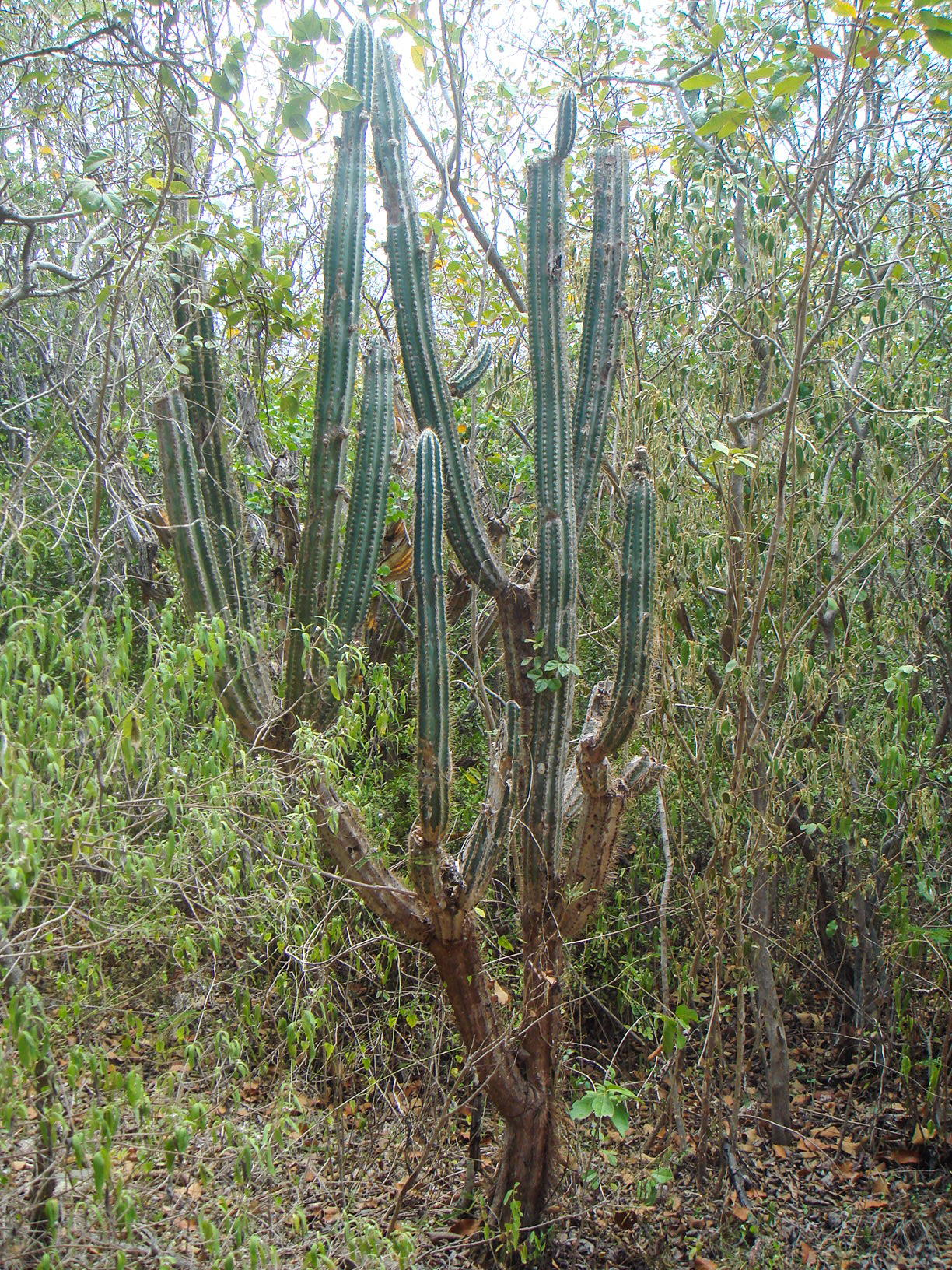
Sebucan
(Pilosocereus armatus (syn. P. royenii var. amatus))

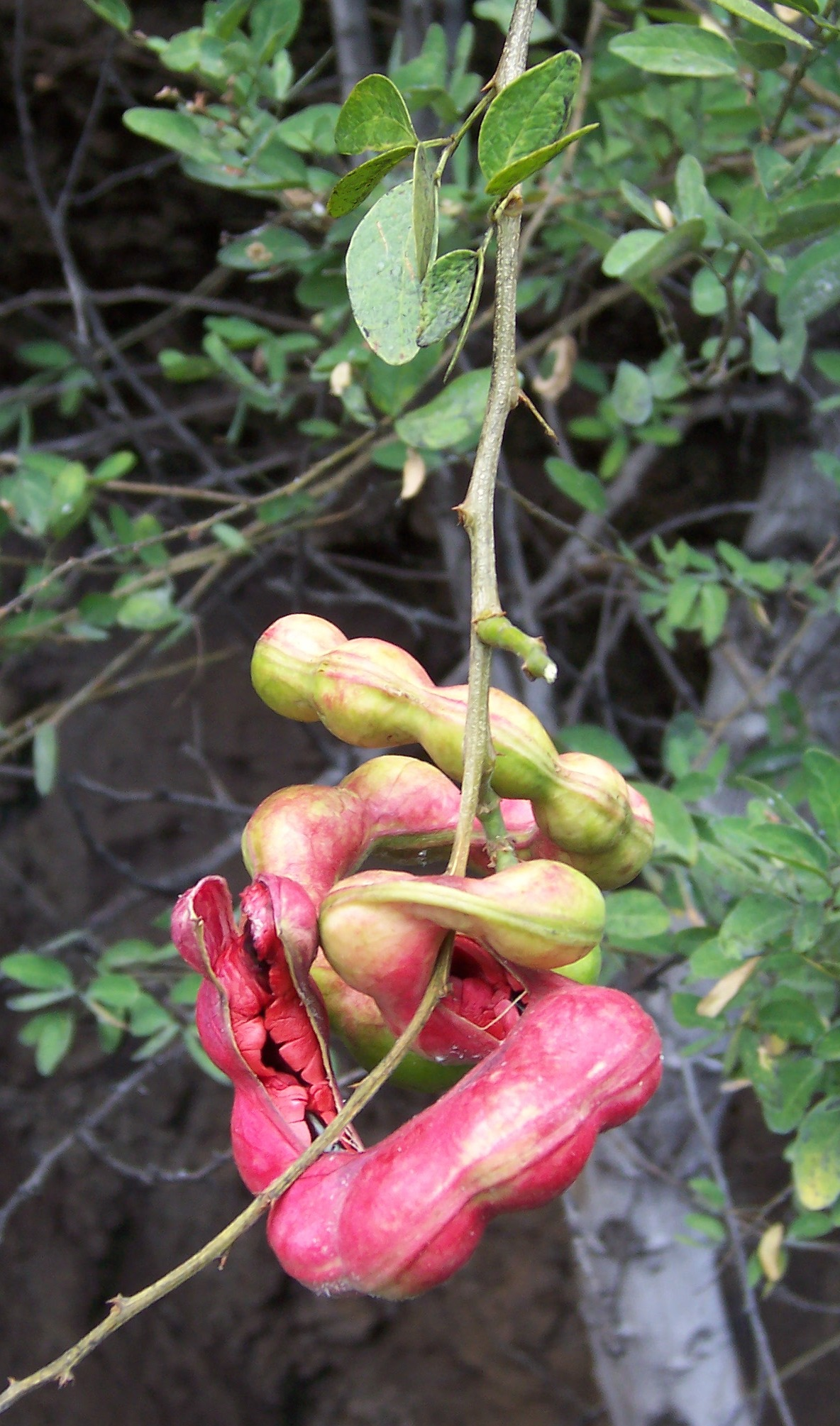
Guamá americano
(Pithecellobium dulce)

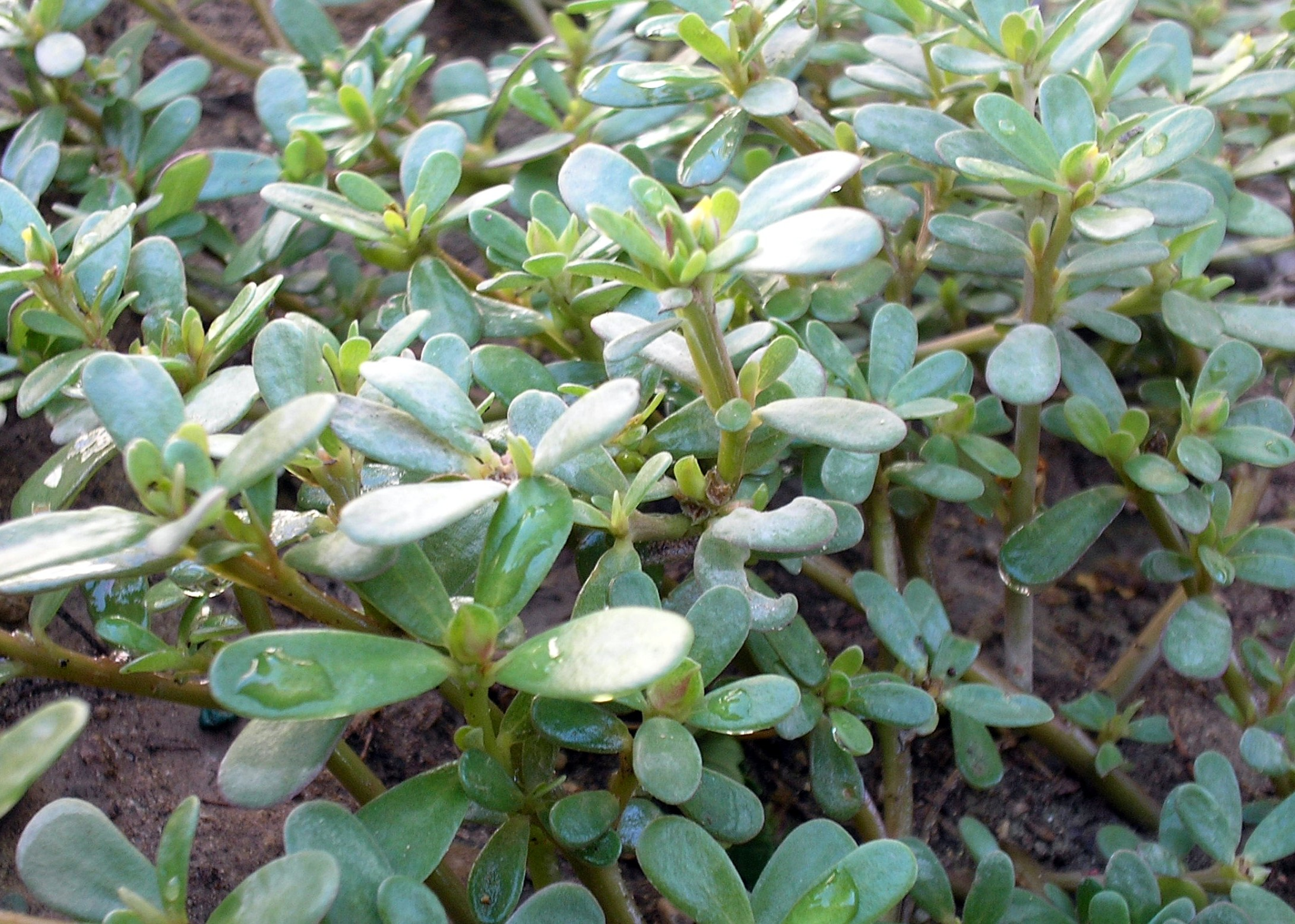
Verdolaga
(Portulaca oleracea)

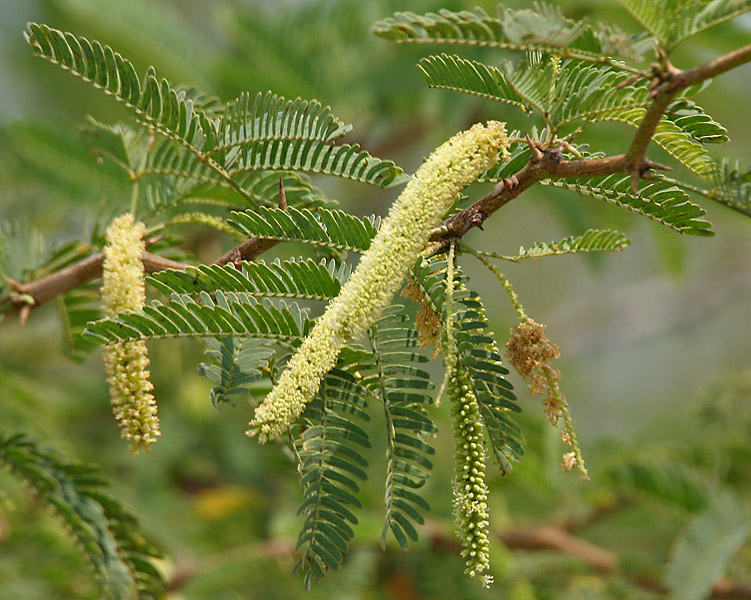
Bayahonda
(Prosopis juliflora)

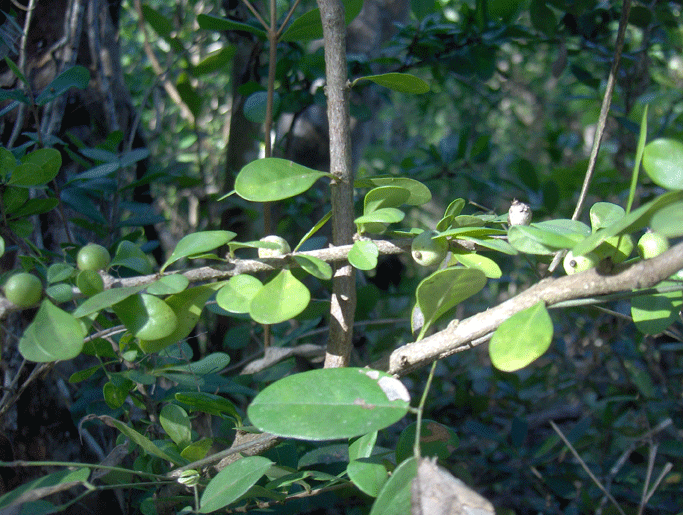
Tintillo
(Randia aculeata)

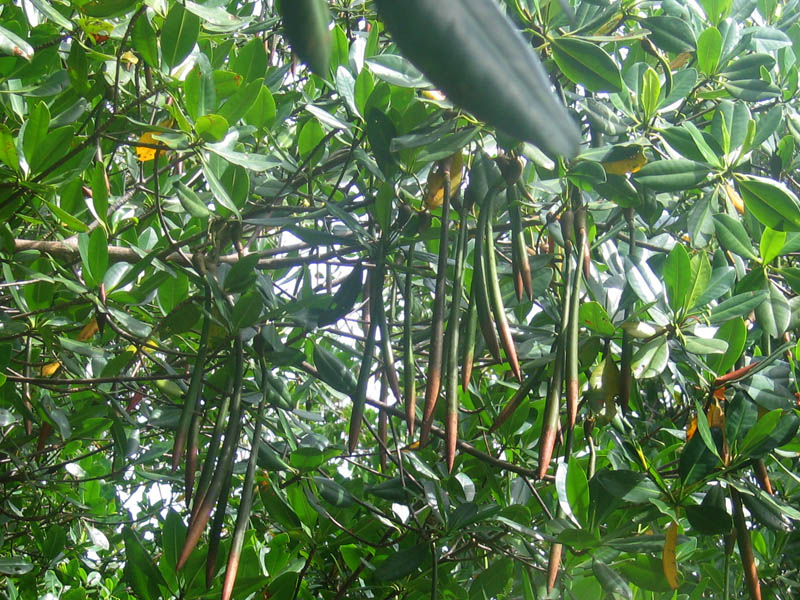
Mangle rojo
(Rhizophora mangle)

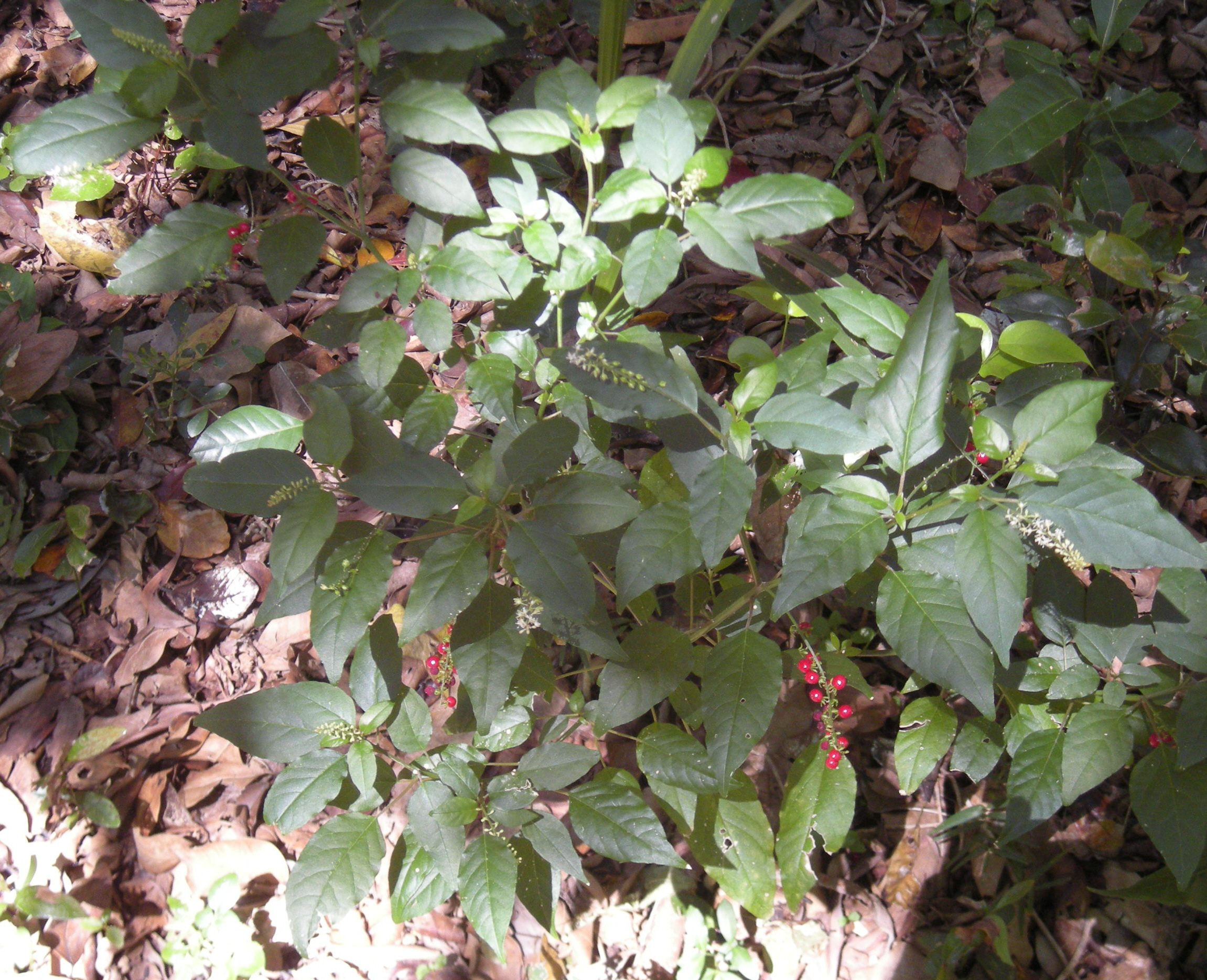
Carmín
(Rivina humilis)

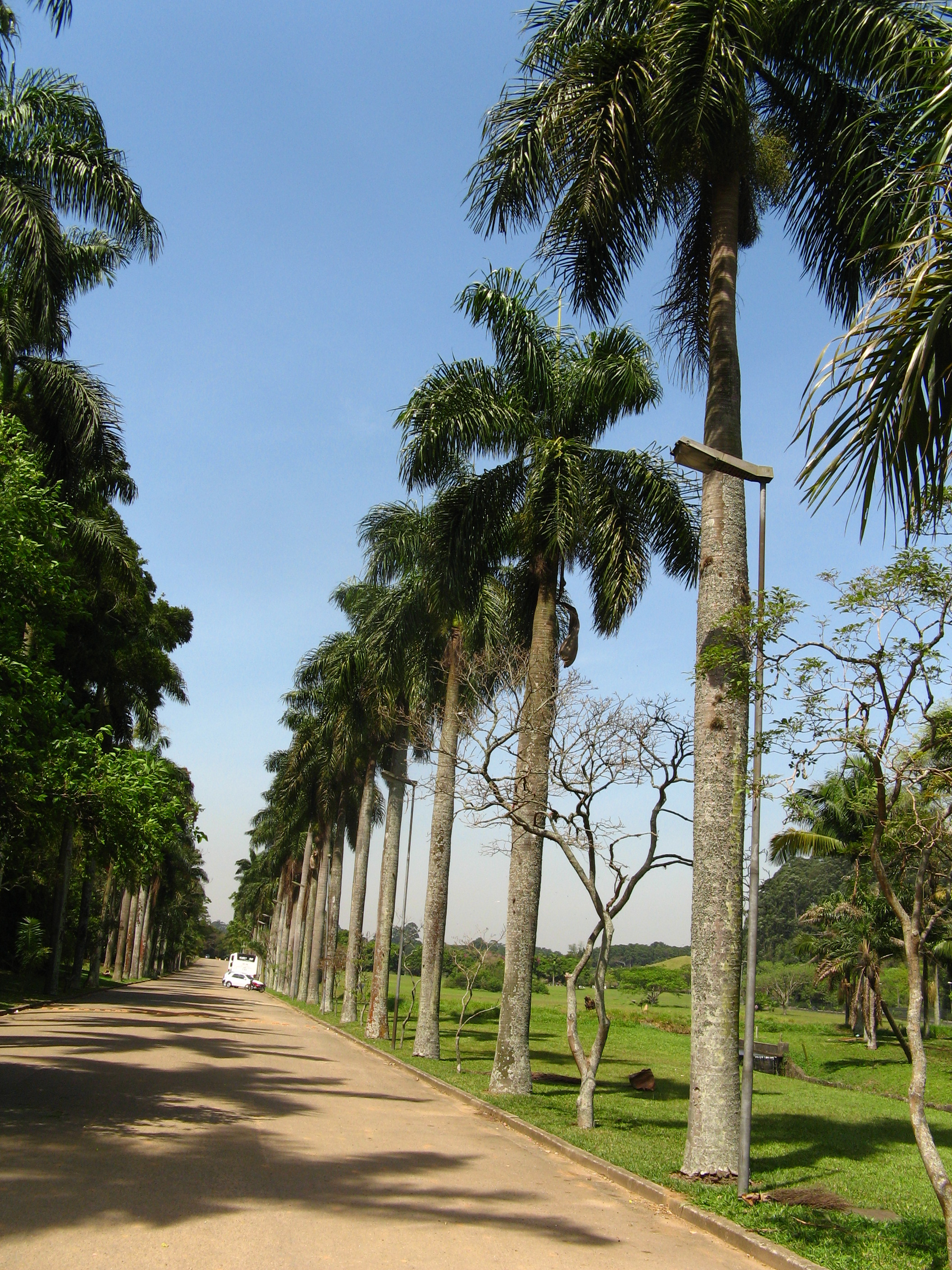
Palma real
(Roystonea borinquena)

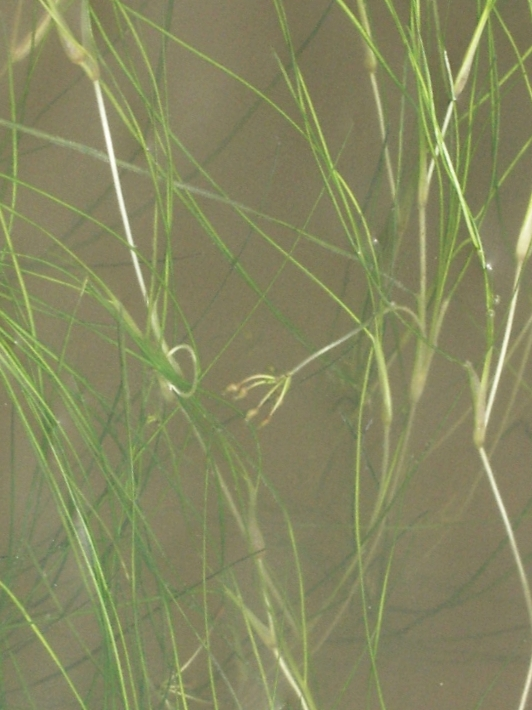
Yerba de zanja
(Ruppia maritima)

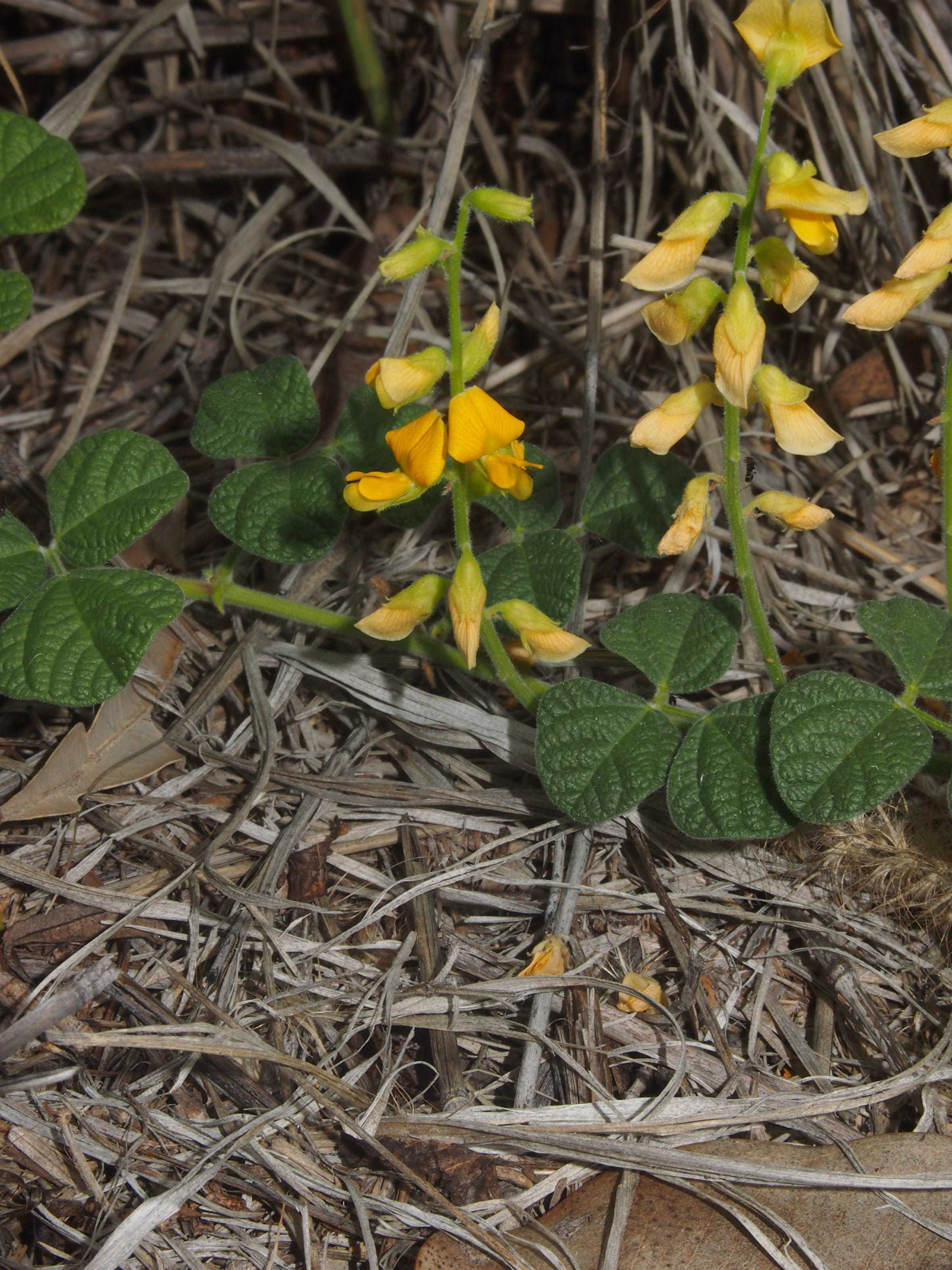
Frijolillo
(Rhynchosia minima)

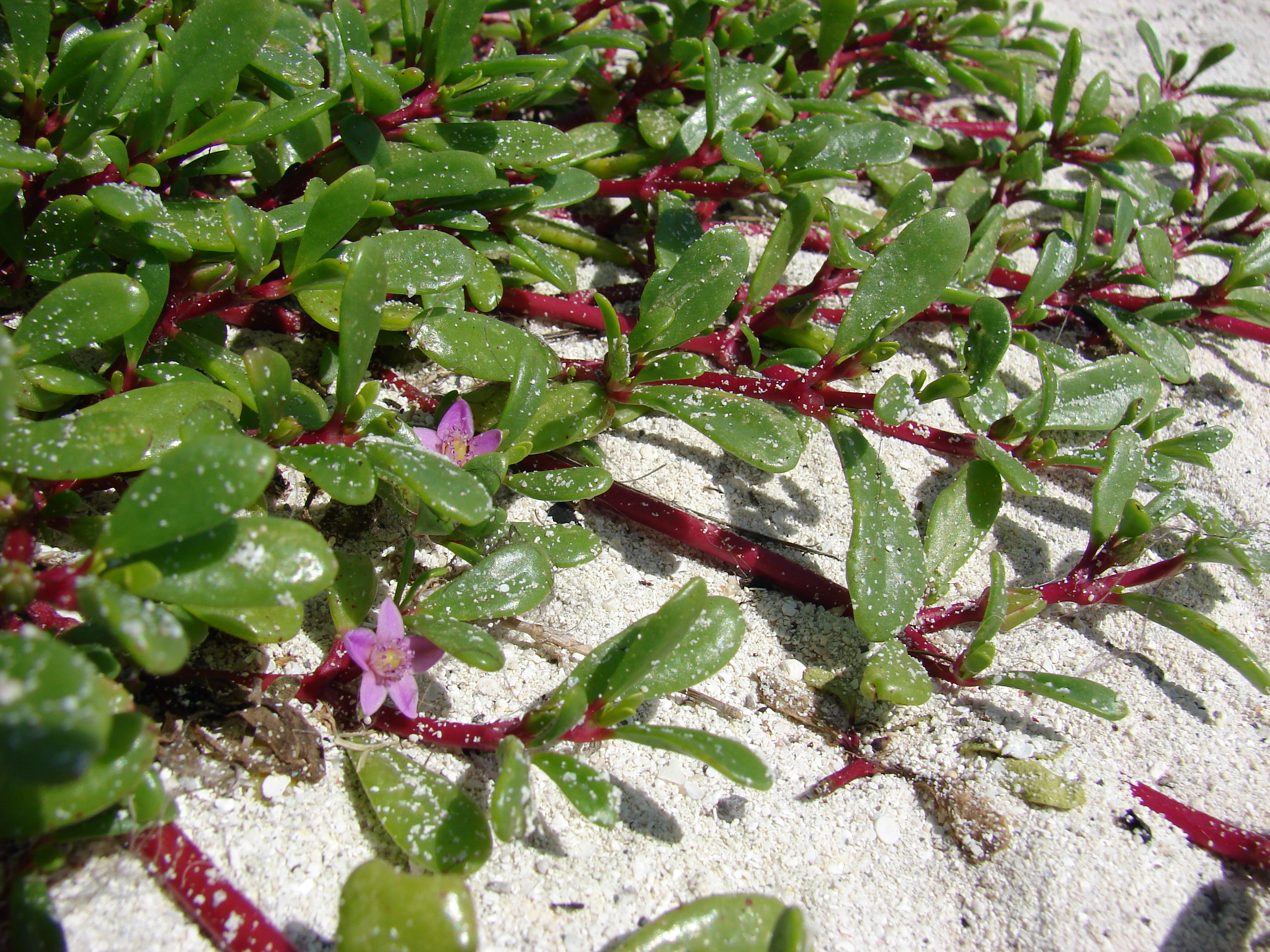
verdolaga rosada
(Sesuvium portulacastrum)

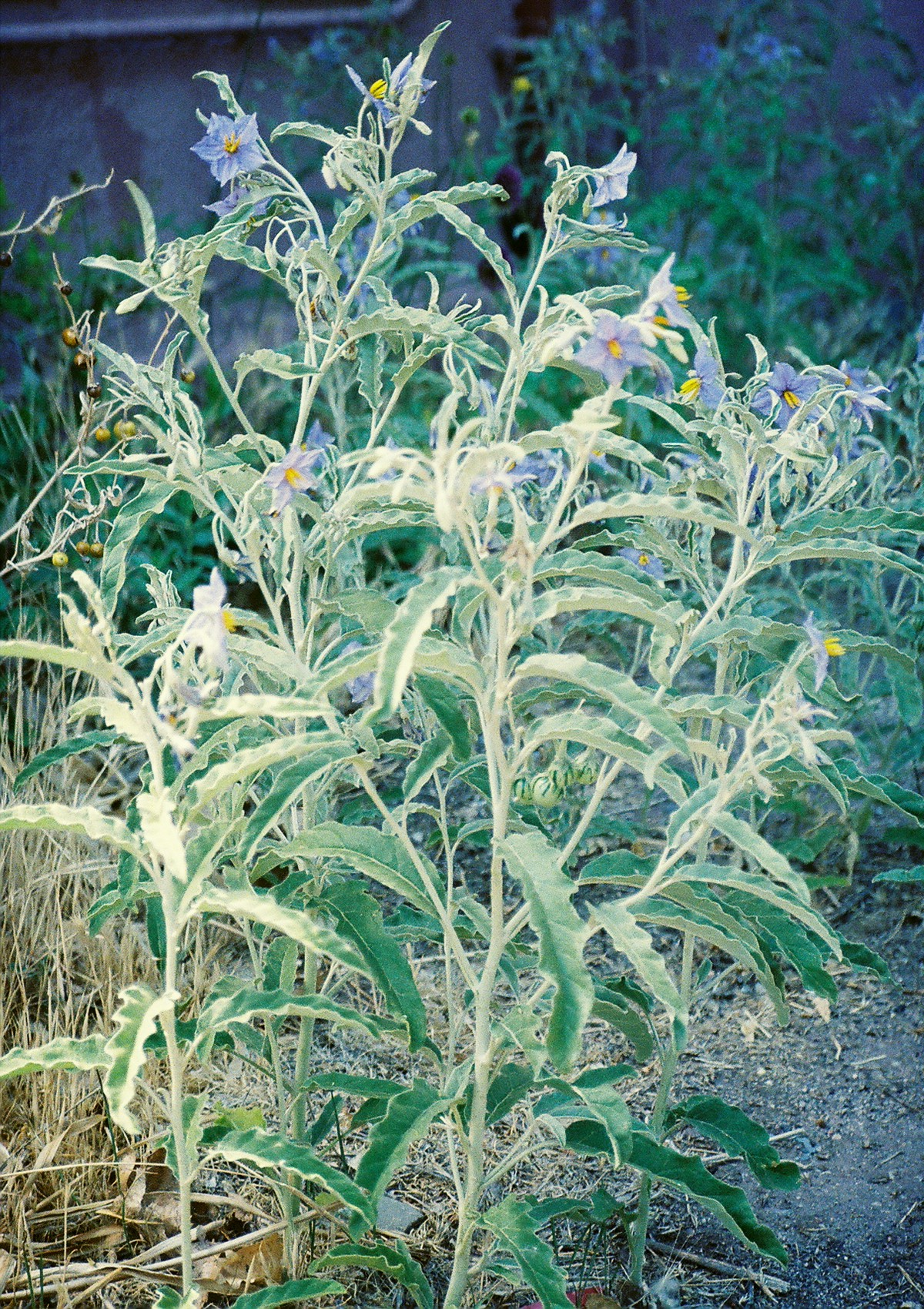
Trompillo
(Solanum elaeagnifolium)

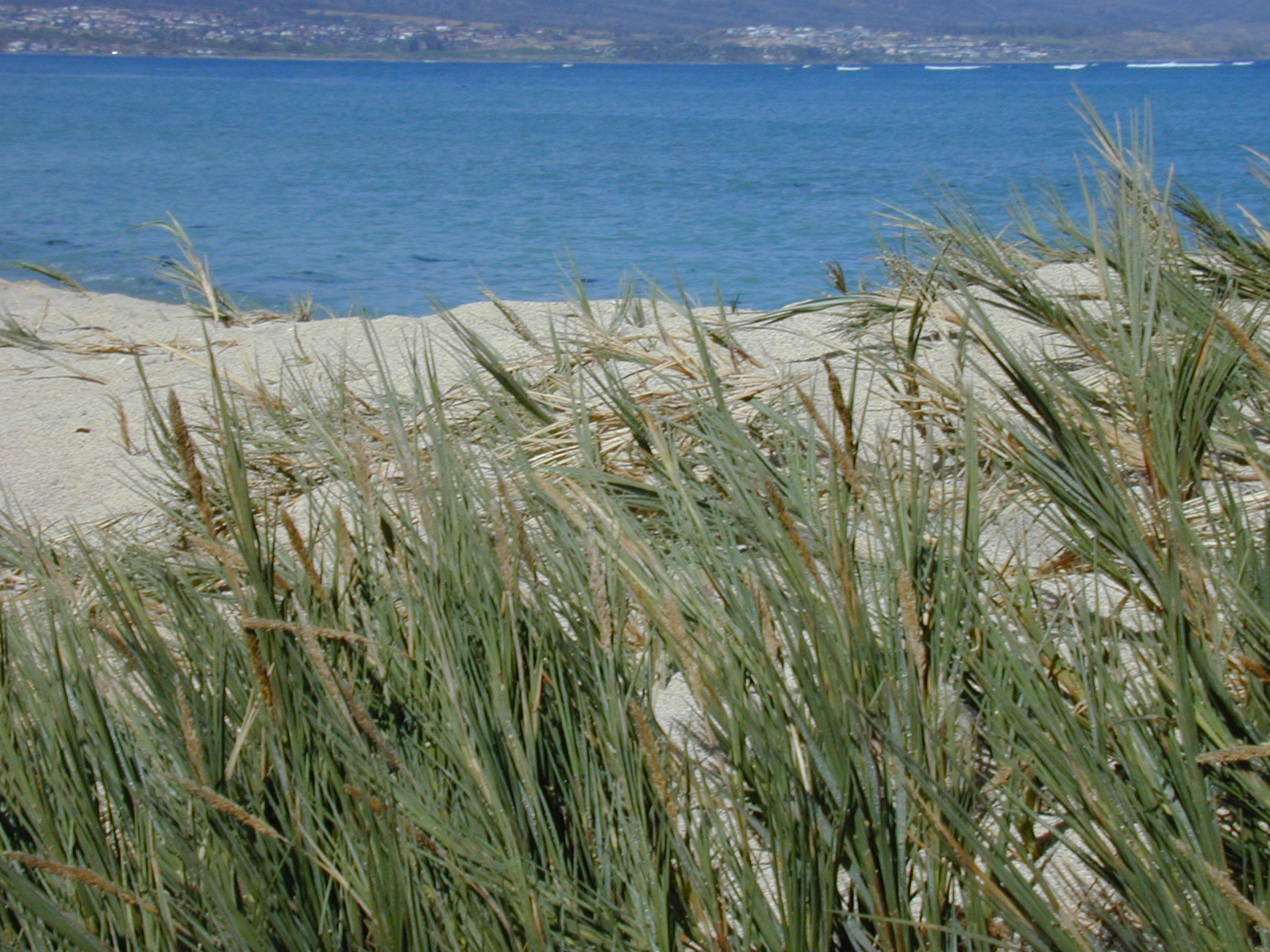
Matojo de burro
(Sporobolus virginicus)

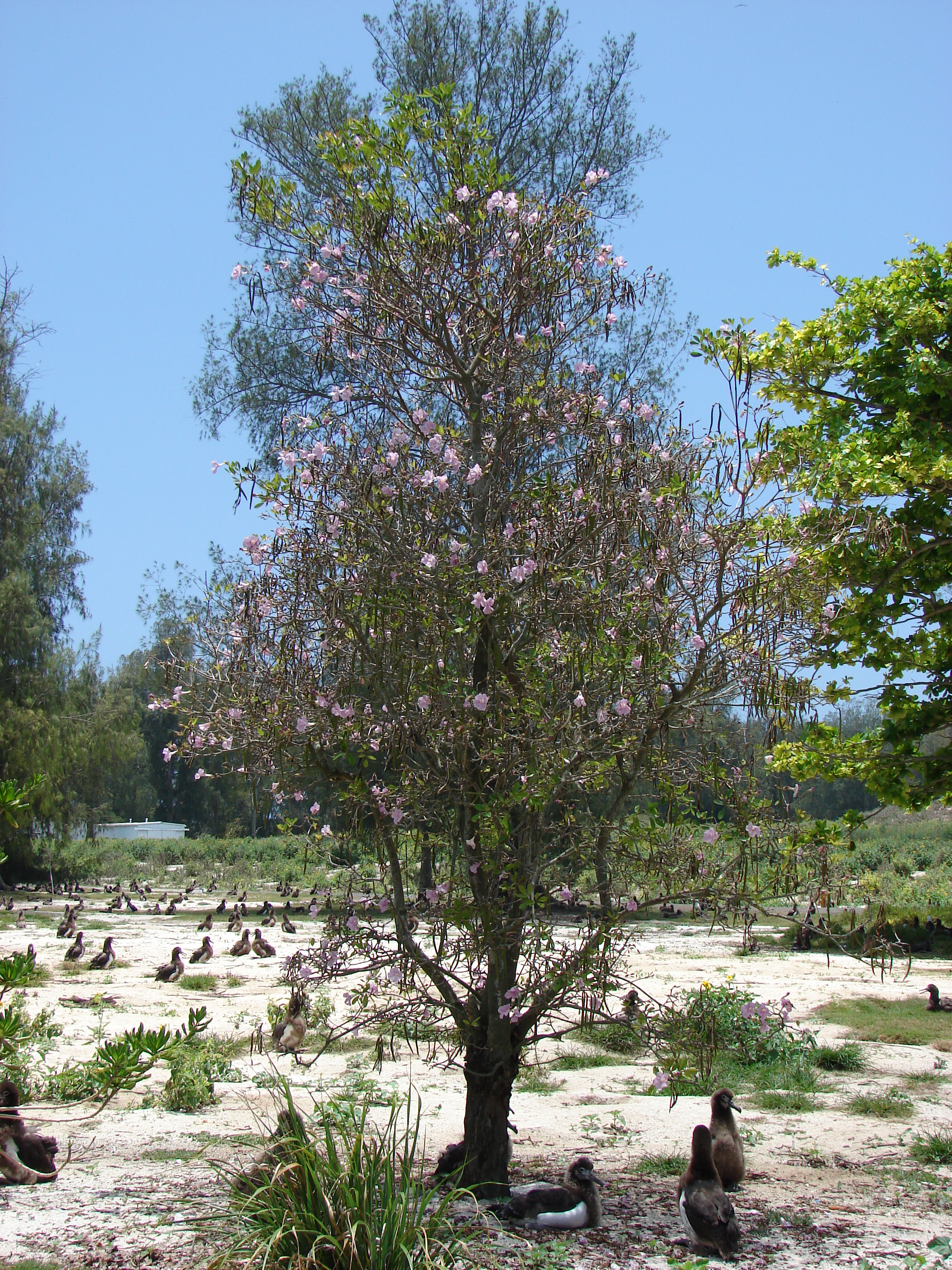
Roble blanco
(Tabebuia heterophylla)

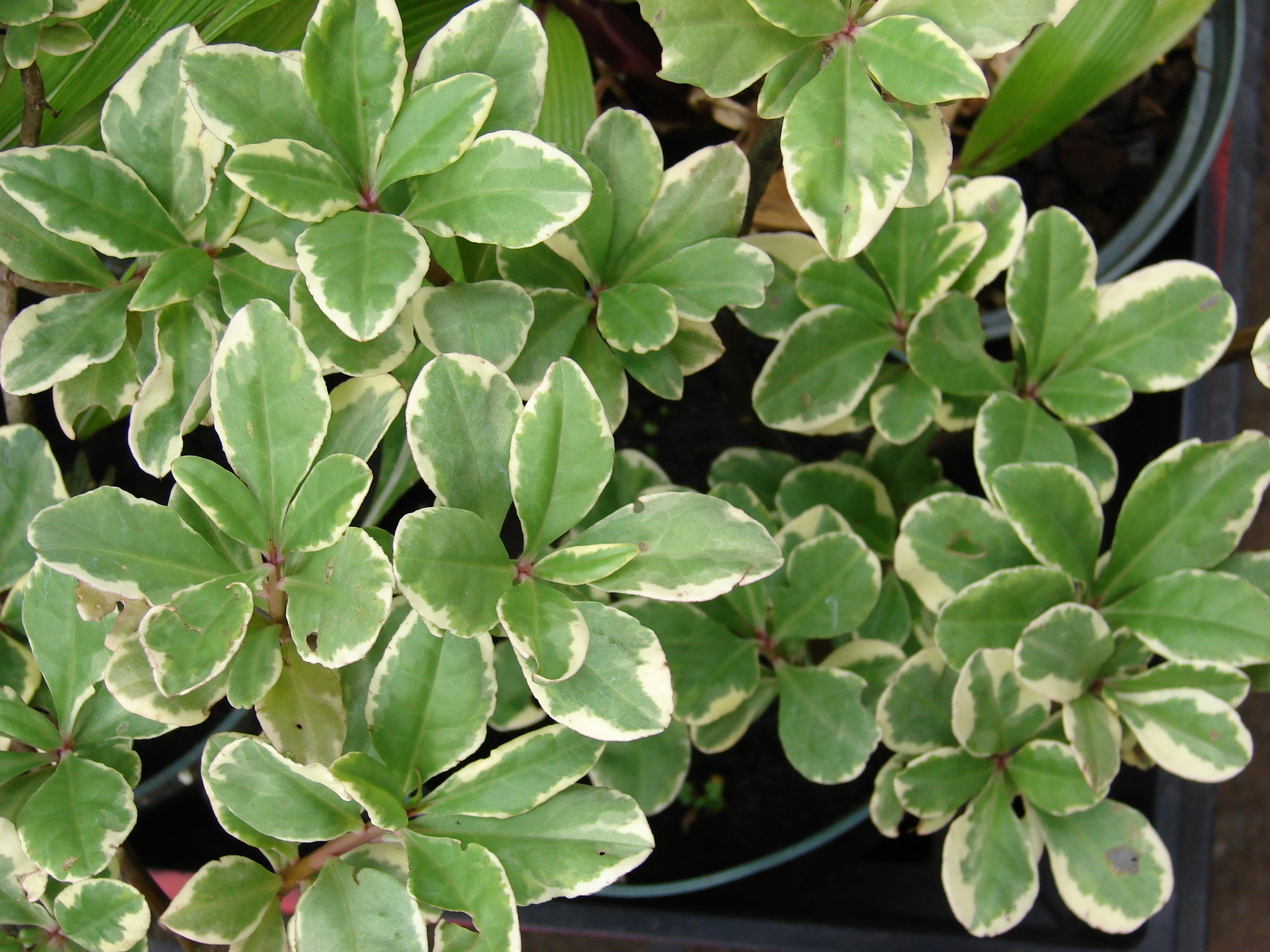
Lengua de vaca
(Talinum paniculatum)

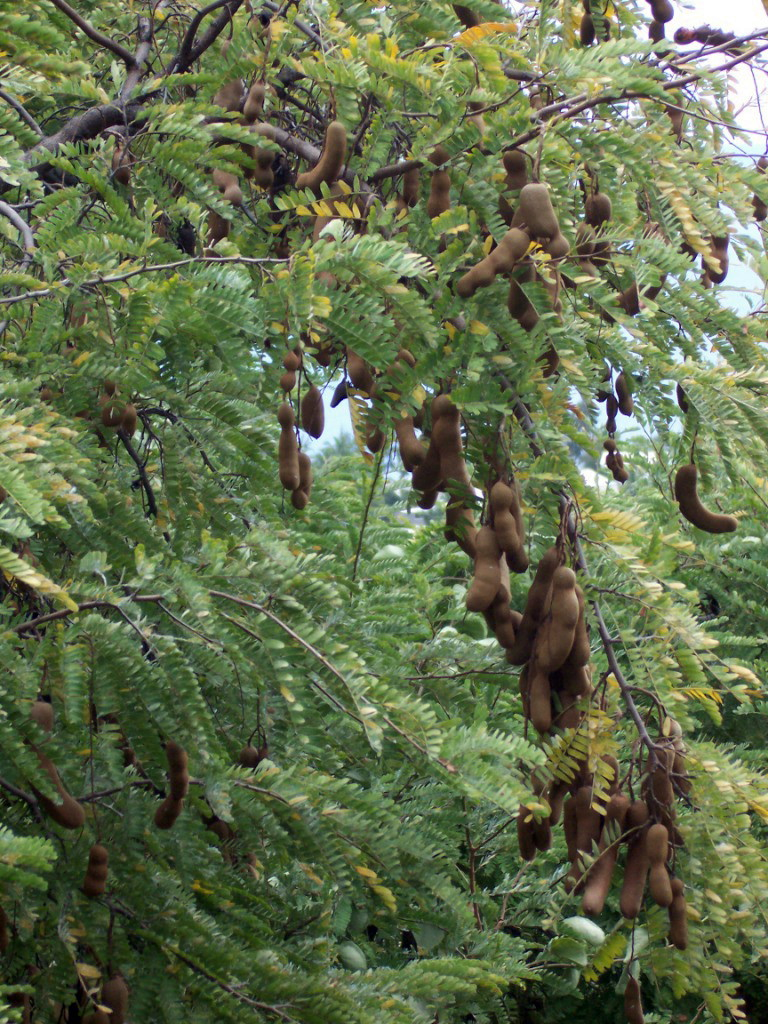
Tamarindo
(Tamarindus indica)

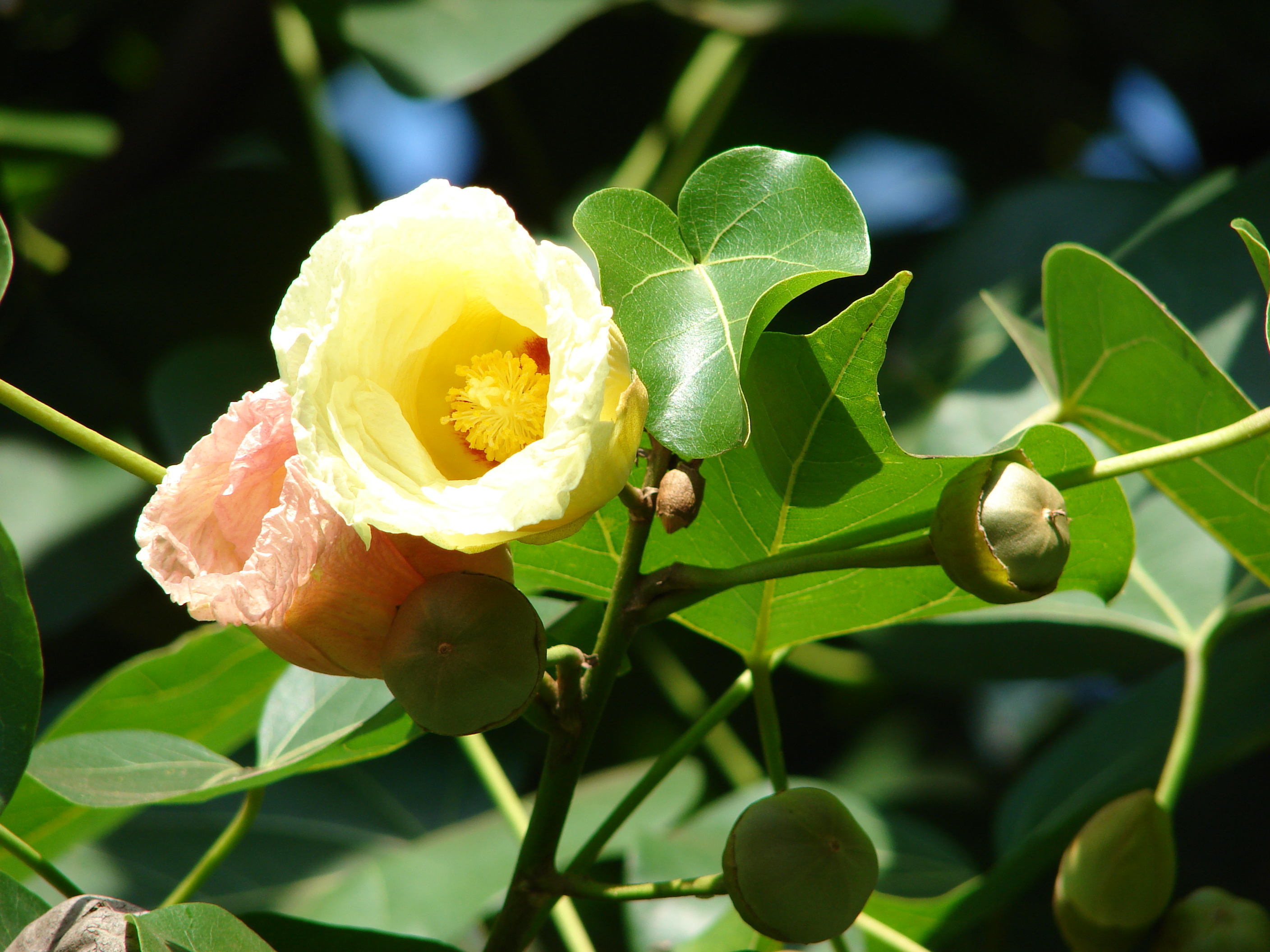
Emajagüilla
(Thespesia populnea)

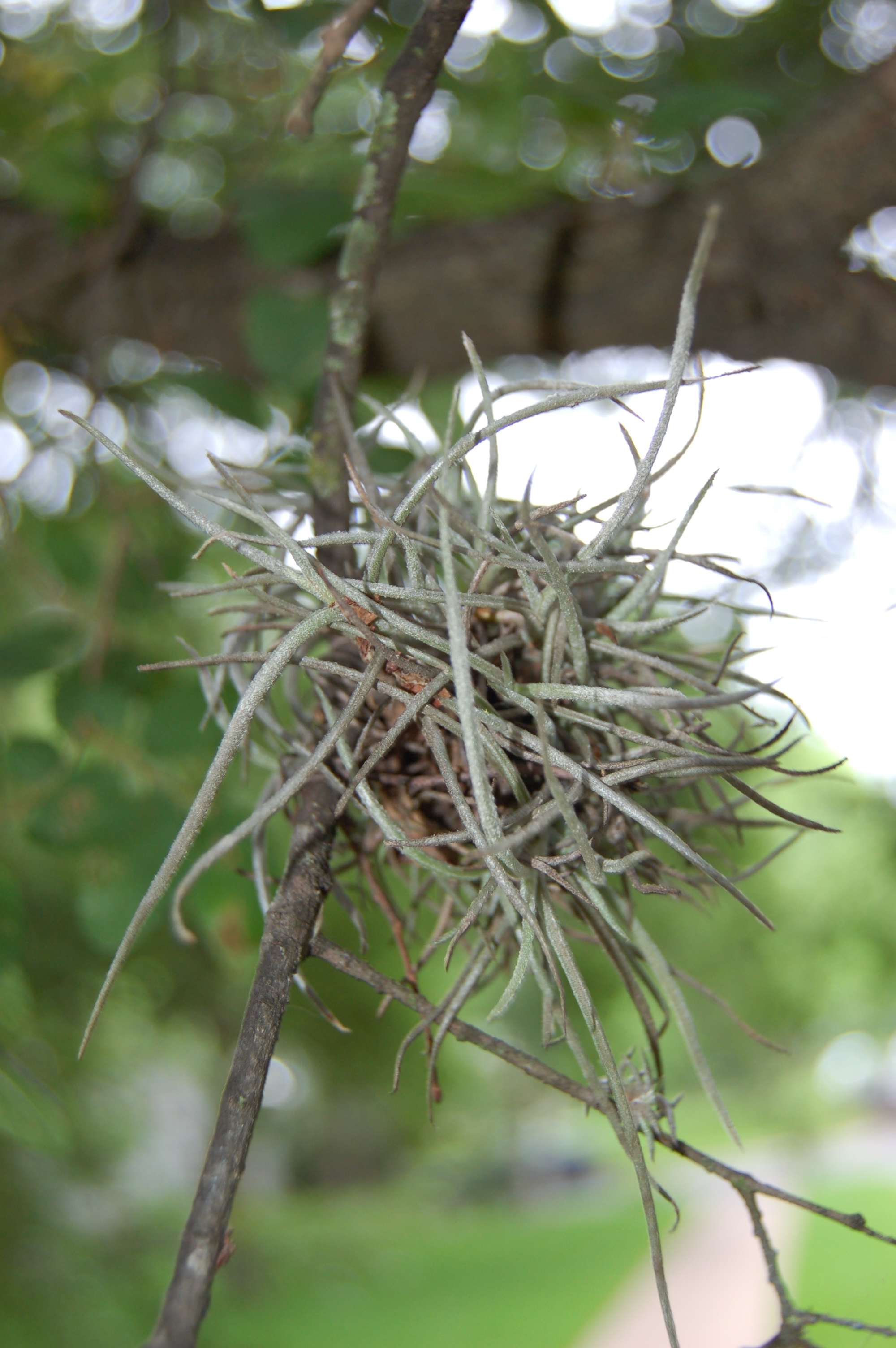
Pirigallo
(Tillandsia recurvata)

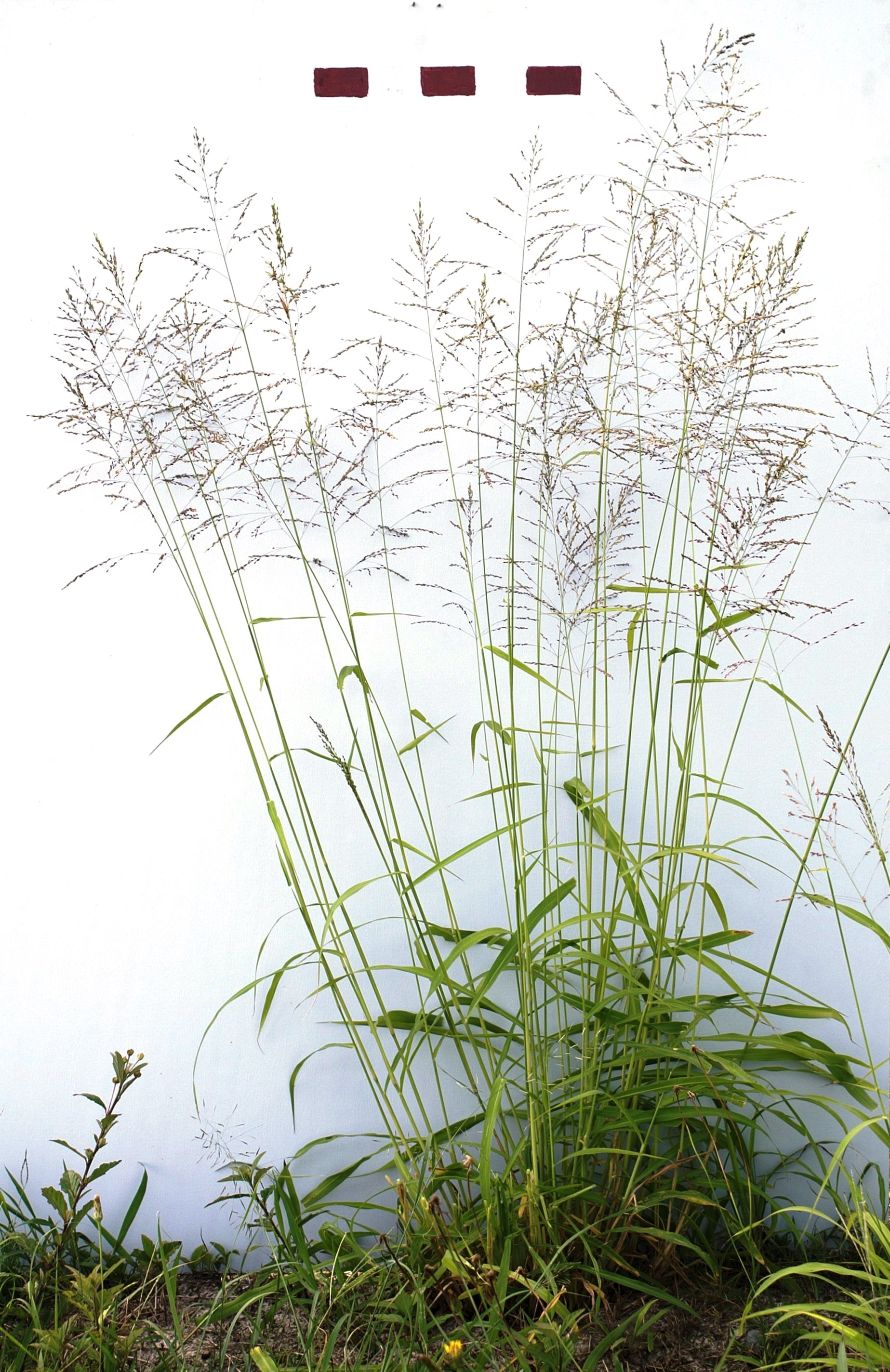
Yerba de guinea
(Urochloa maxima)

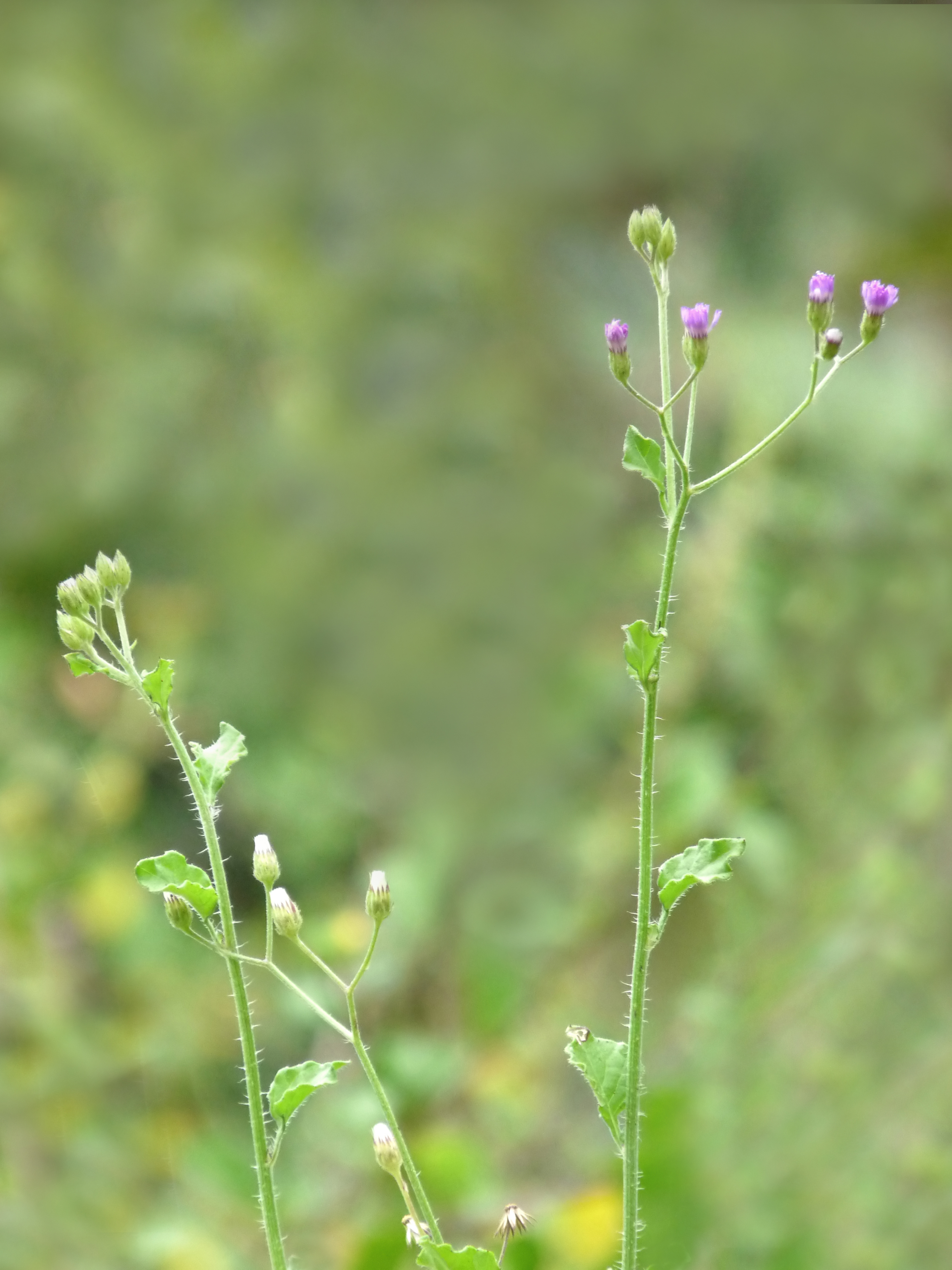
Yerba socialista
(Vernonia cinerea)

=== Fauna at Punta Cucharas ===
==== Birds ====
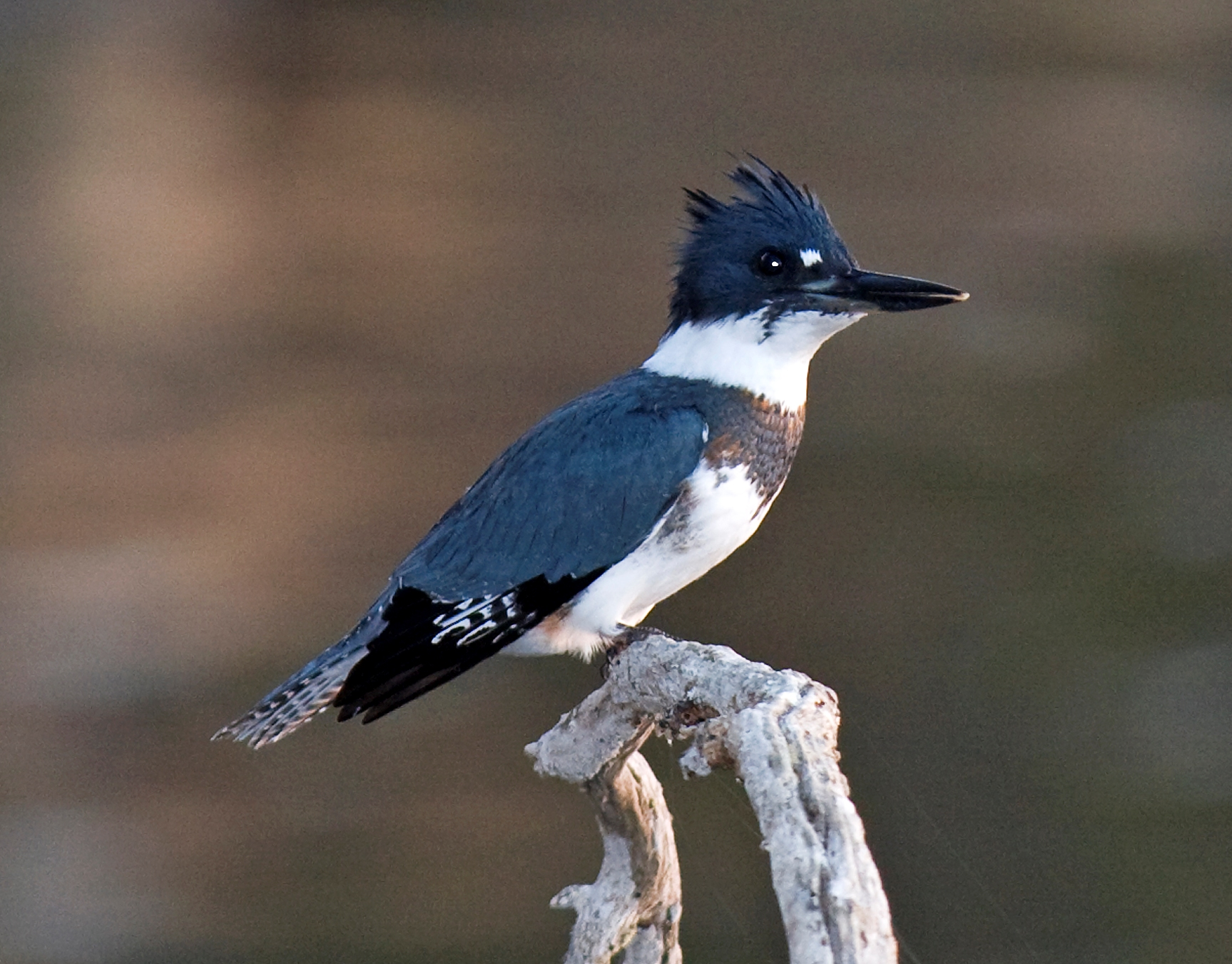
Martín pescador
(Ceryle alcyon)

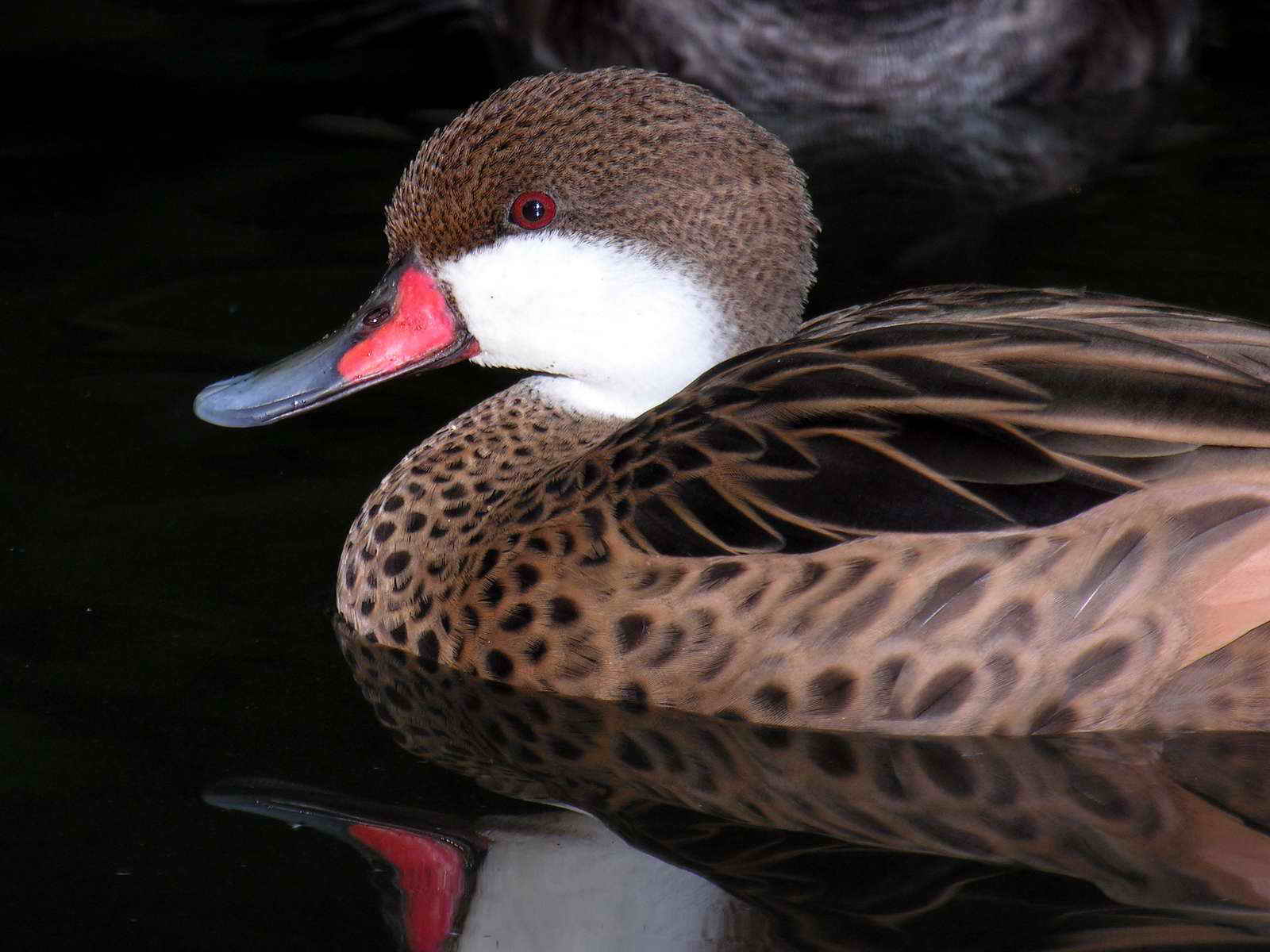
Pato quijada colorada
(Anas bahamensis)

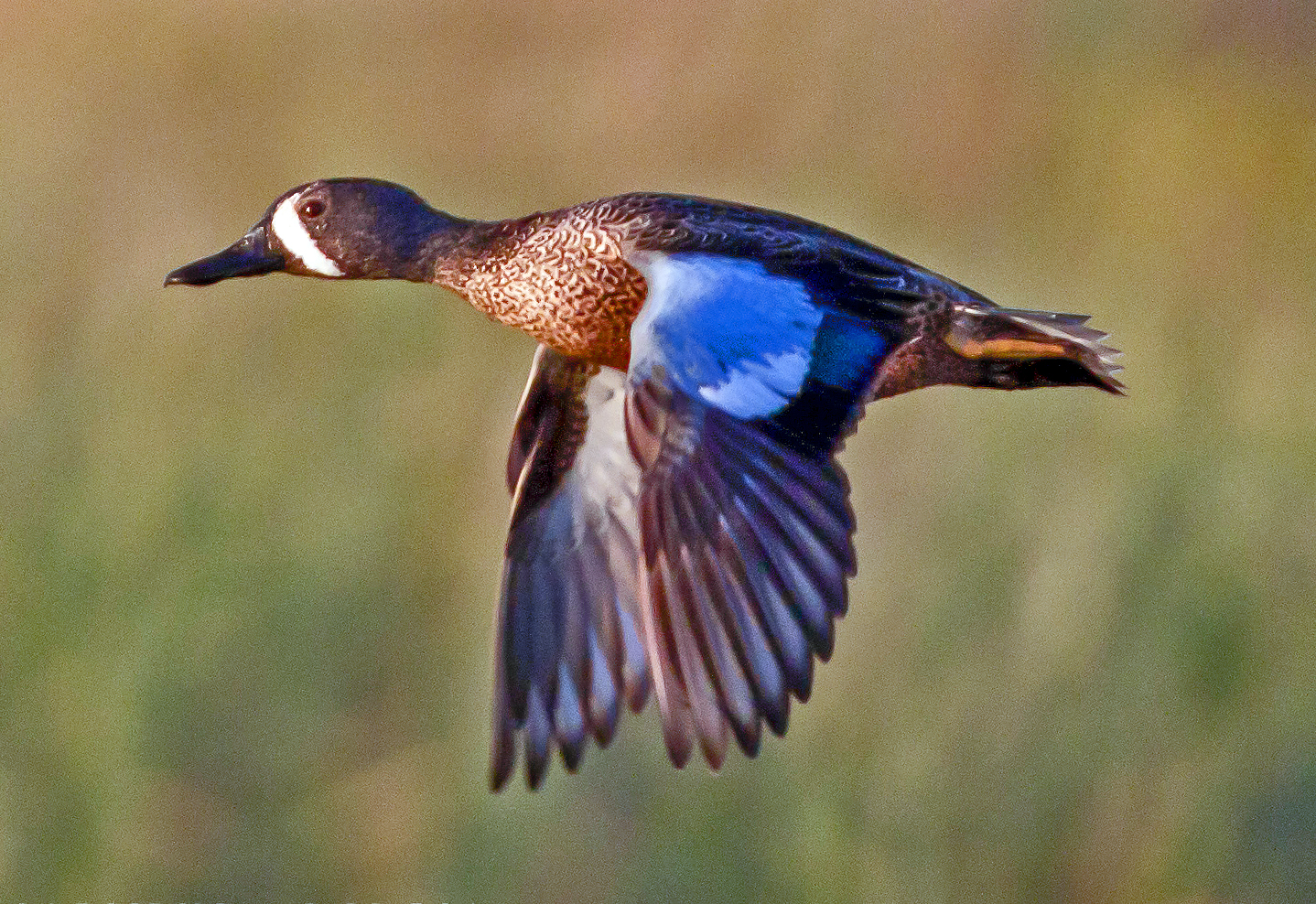
Pato zarcel
(Anas discors)

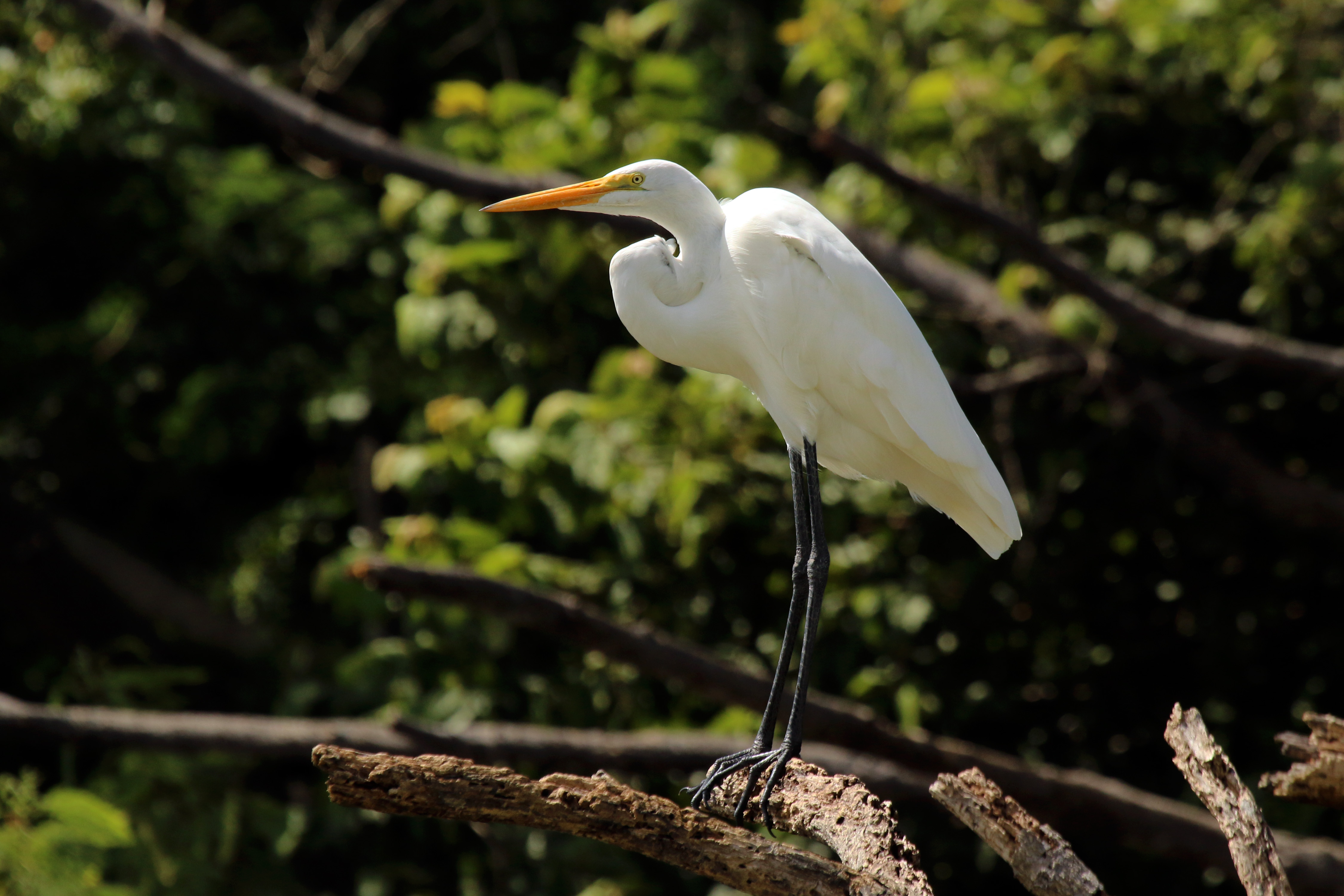
Garza real
(Ardea alba)

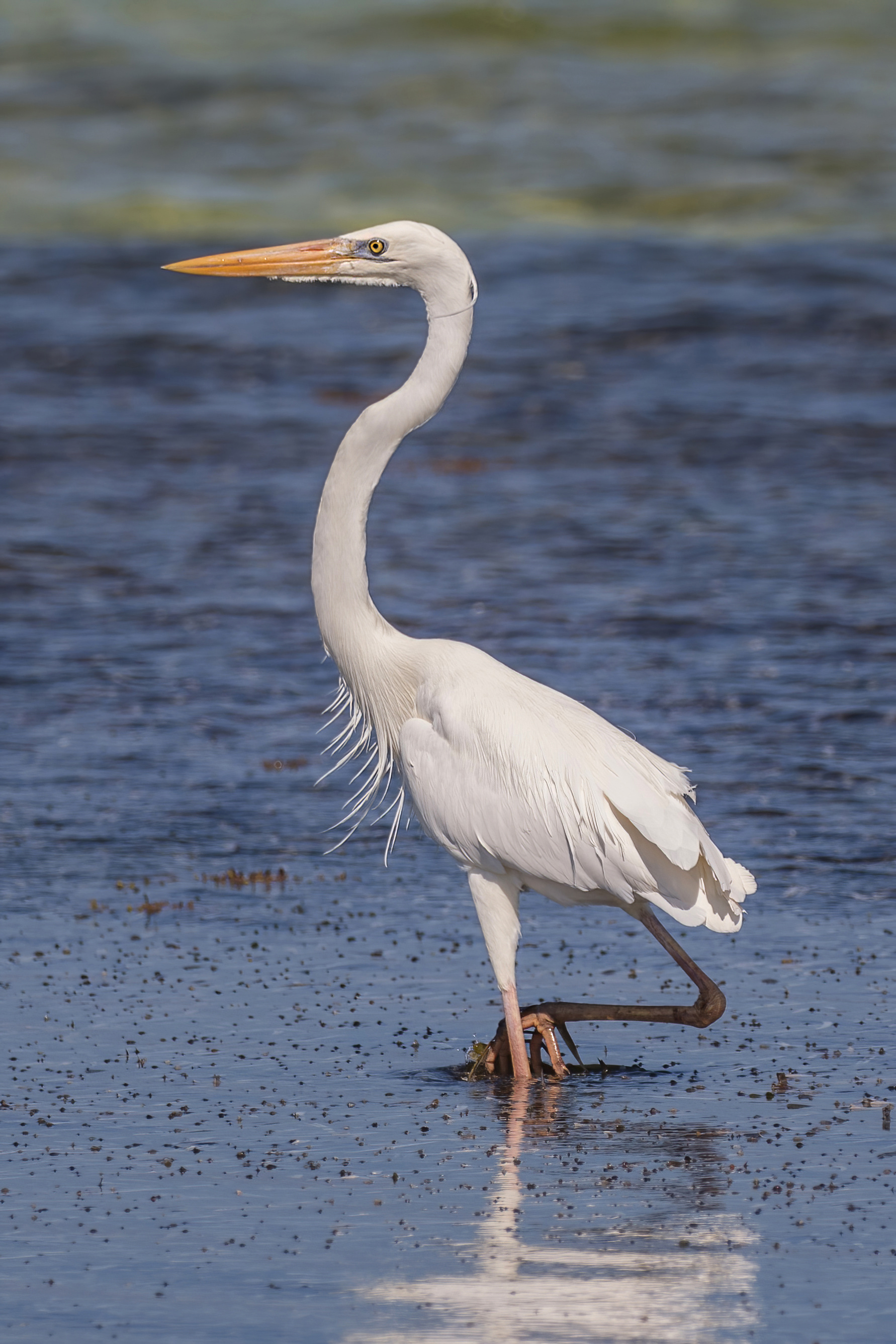
Garzón cenizo
(Ardea herodias)

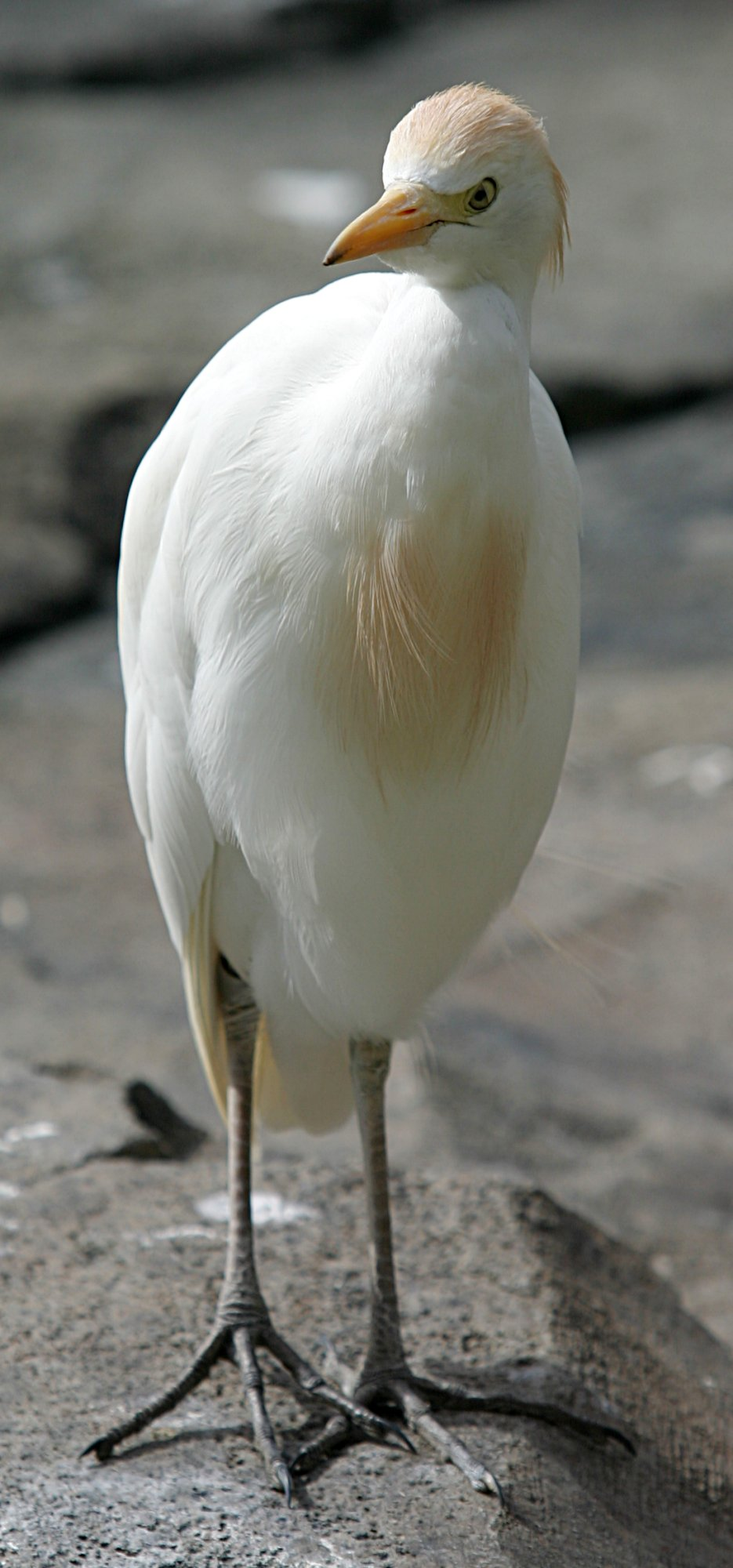
Garza ganadera
(Bubulcus ibis)

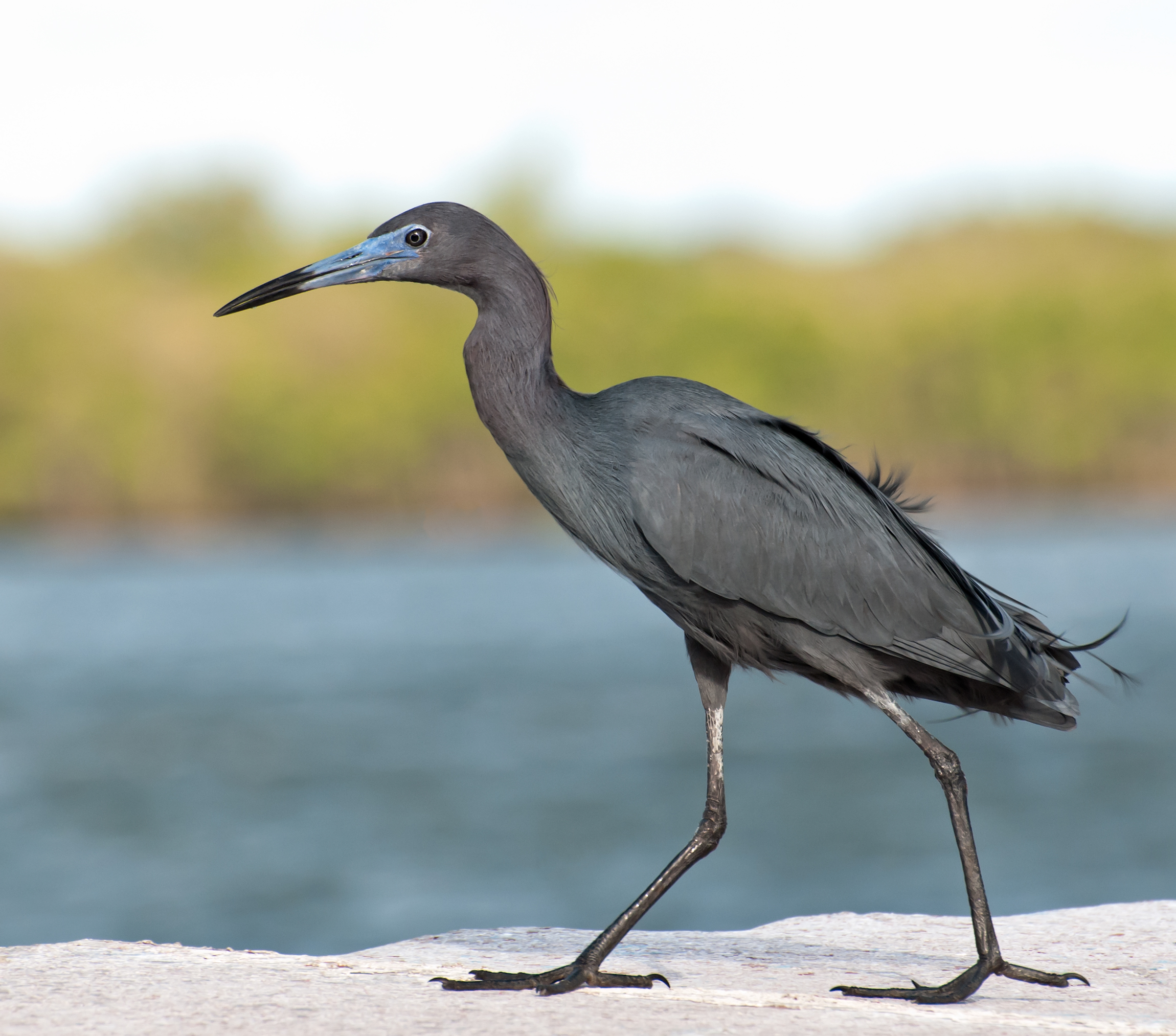
Garza azul
(Egretta caerulea)

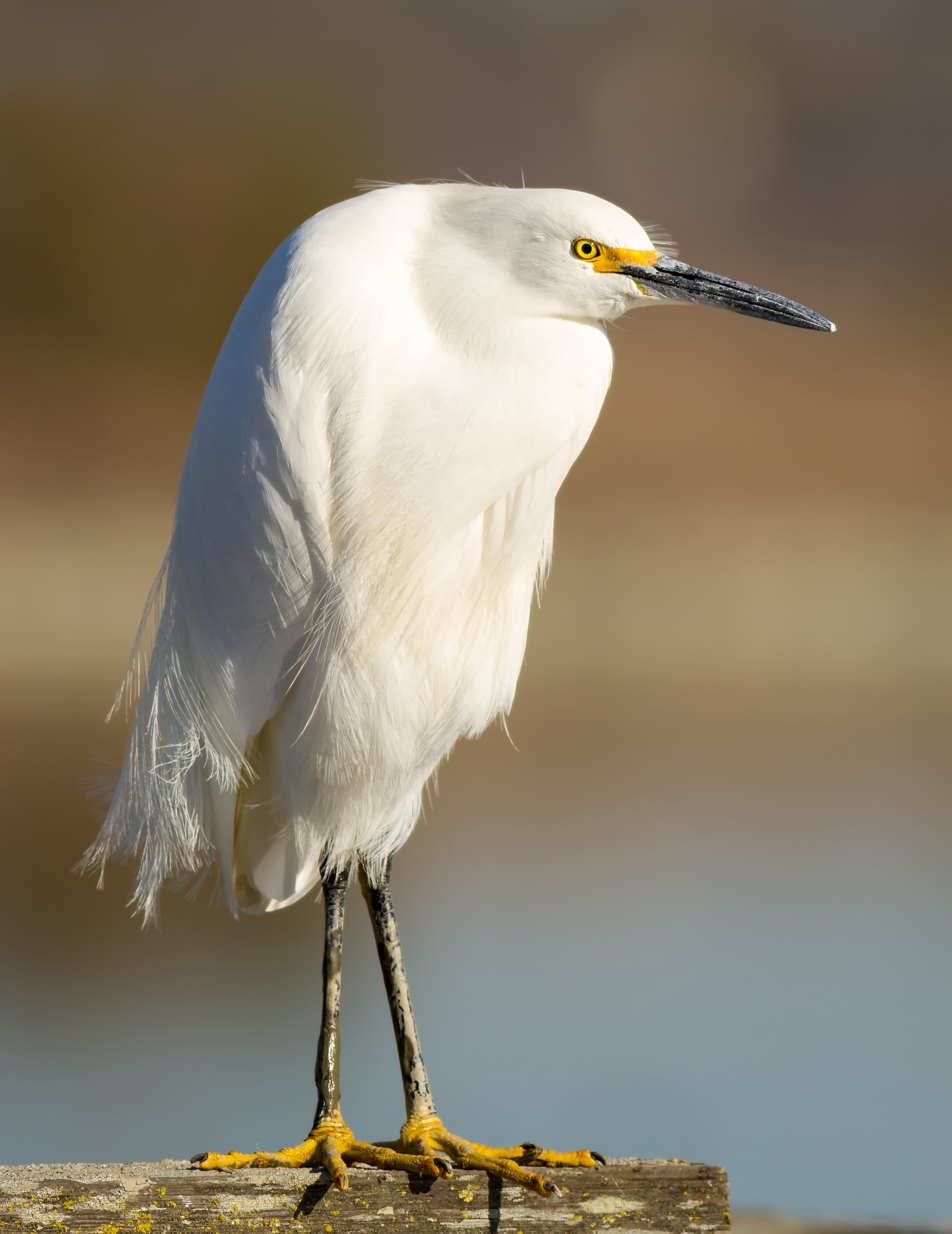
Garza blanca
(Egretta thula)

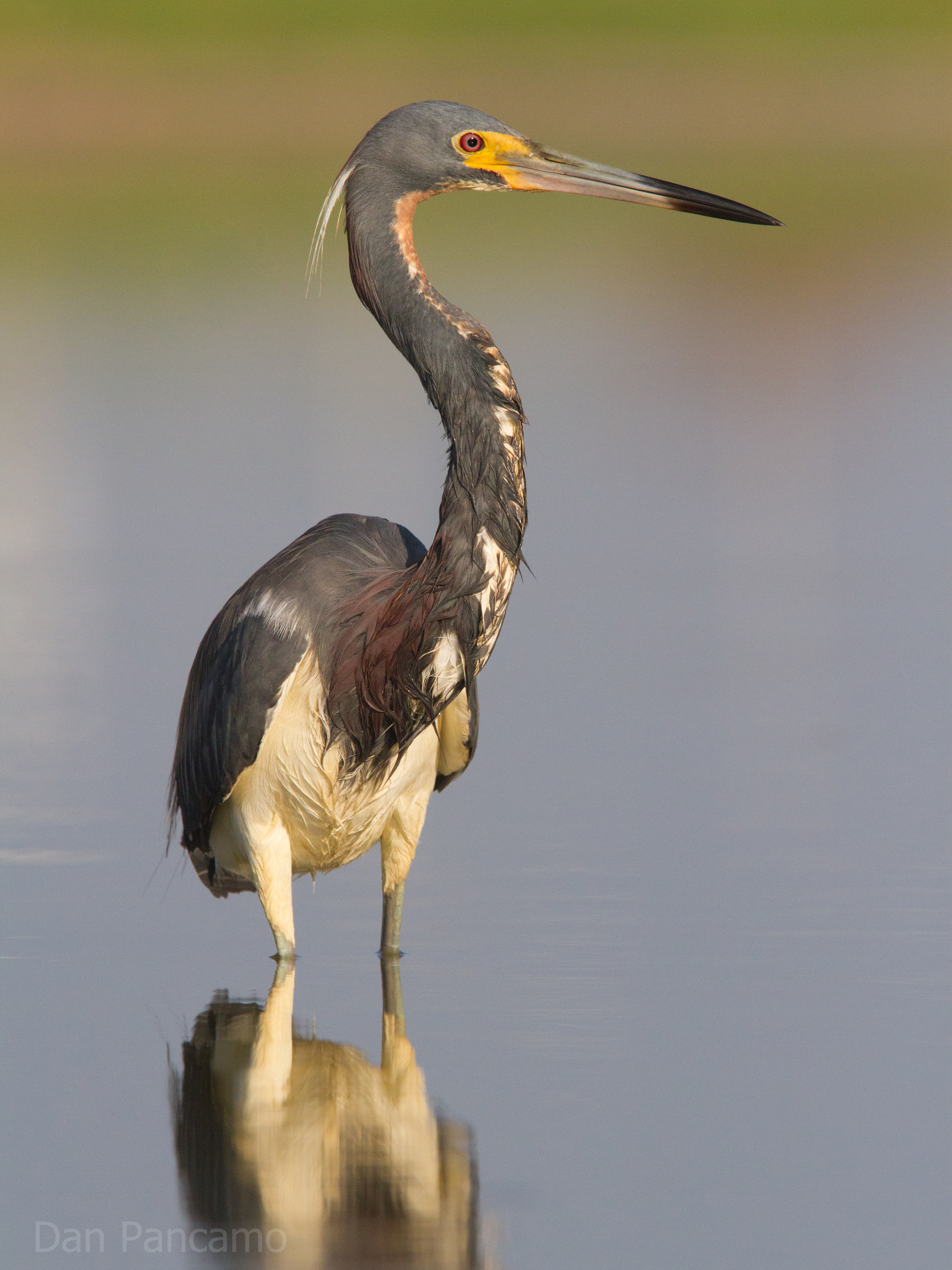
Garza pechiblanca
(Egretta tricolor)

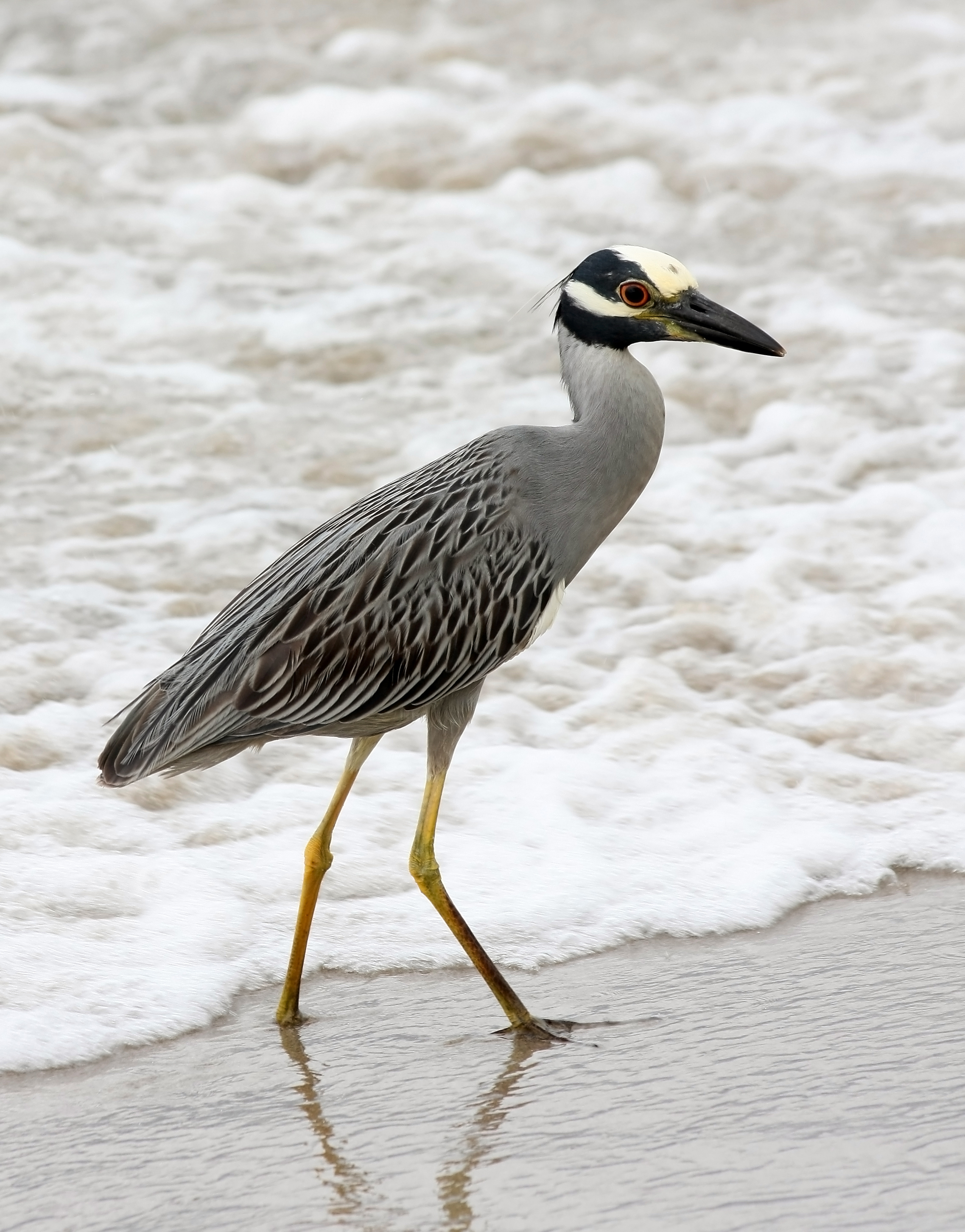
Yaboa común
(Nyctanassa violacea)

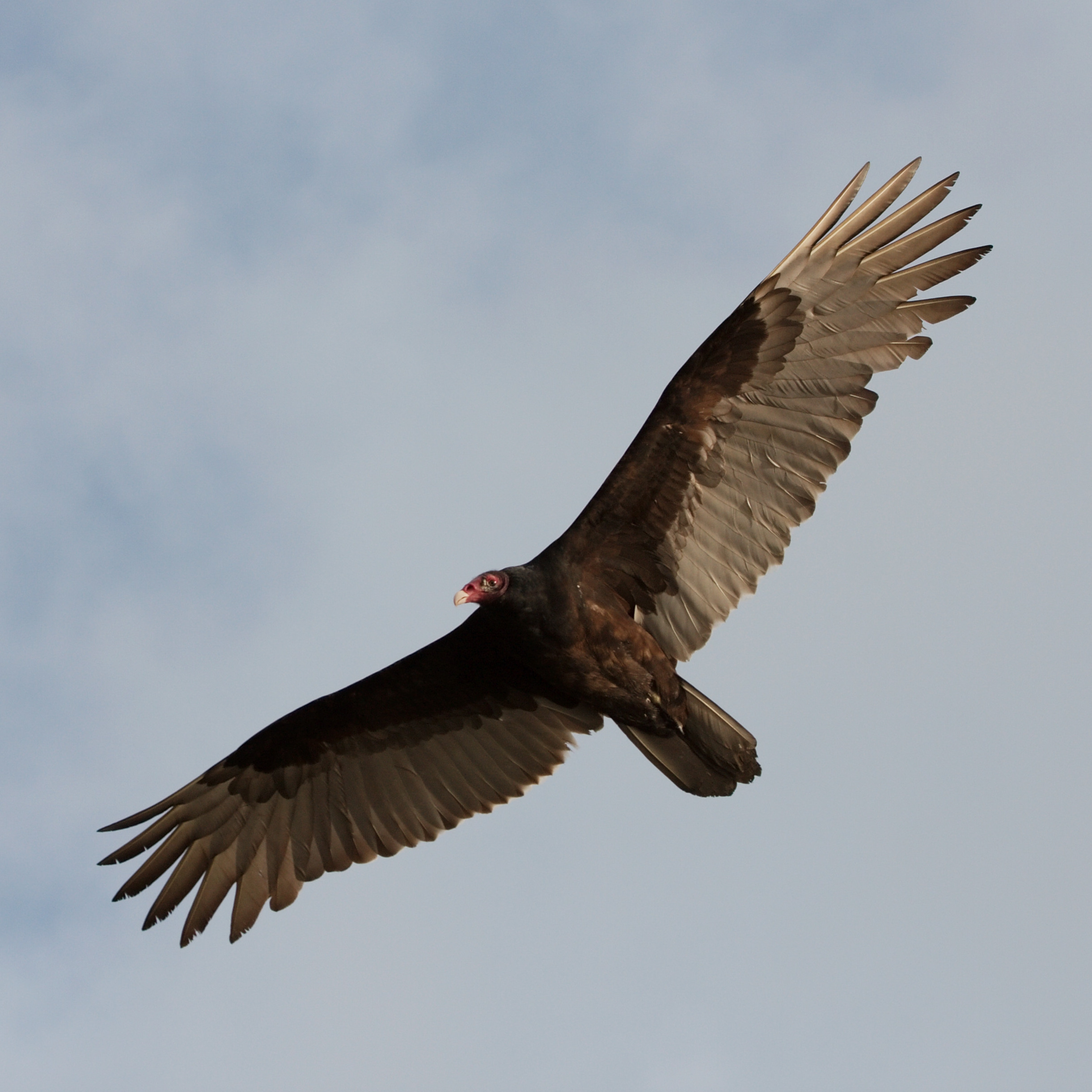
Aura tiñosa
(Cathartes aura)

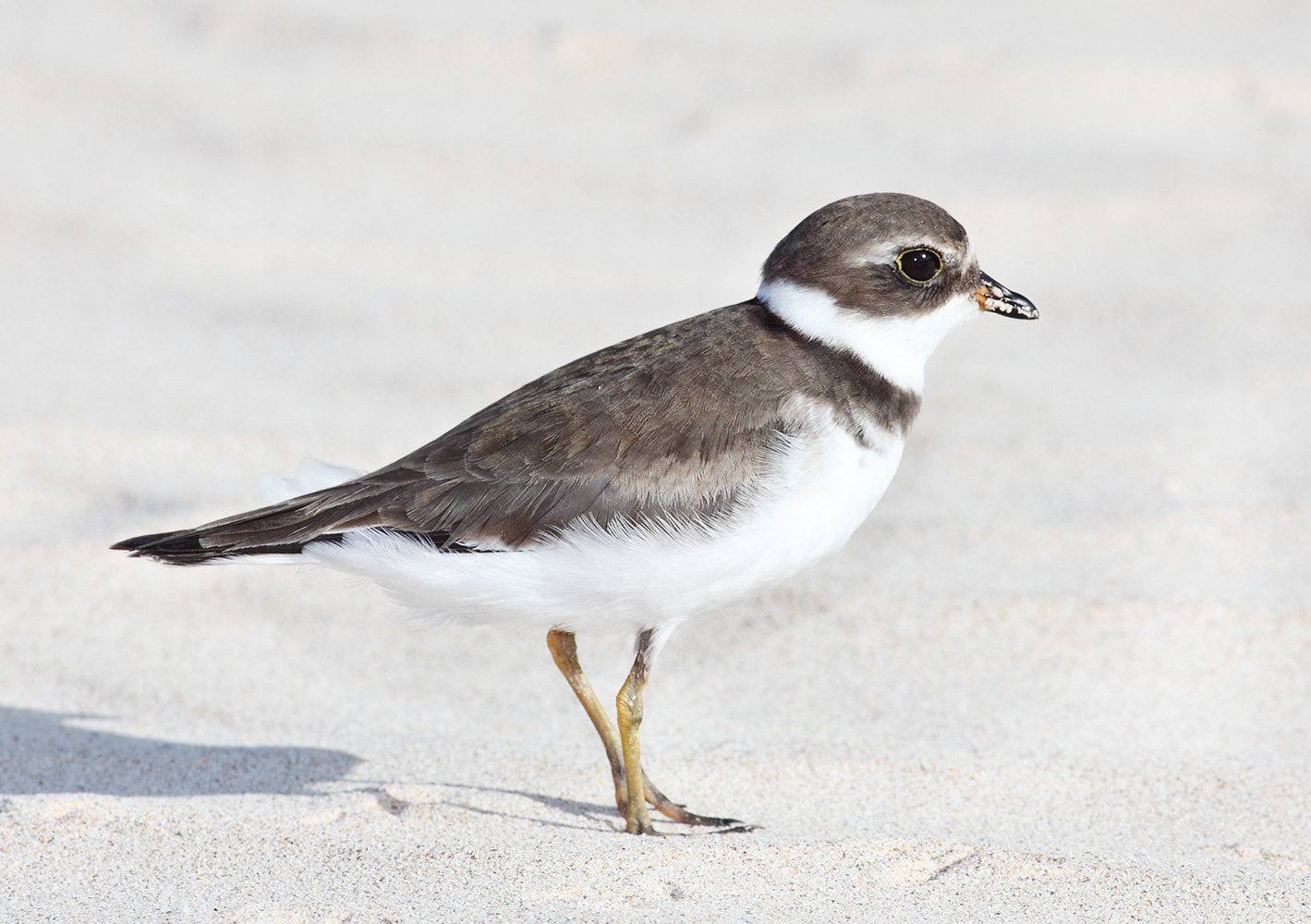
Playero acollarado
(Charadrius semipalmatus)

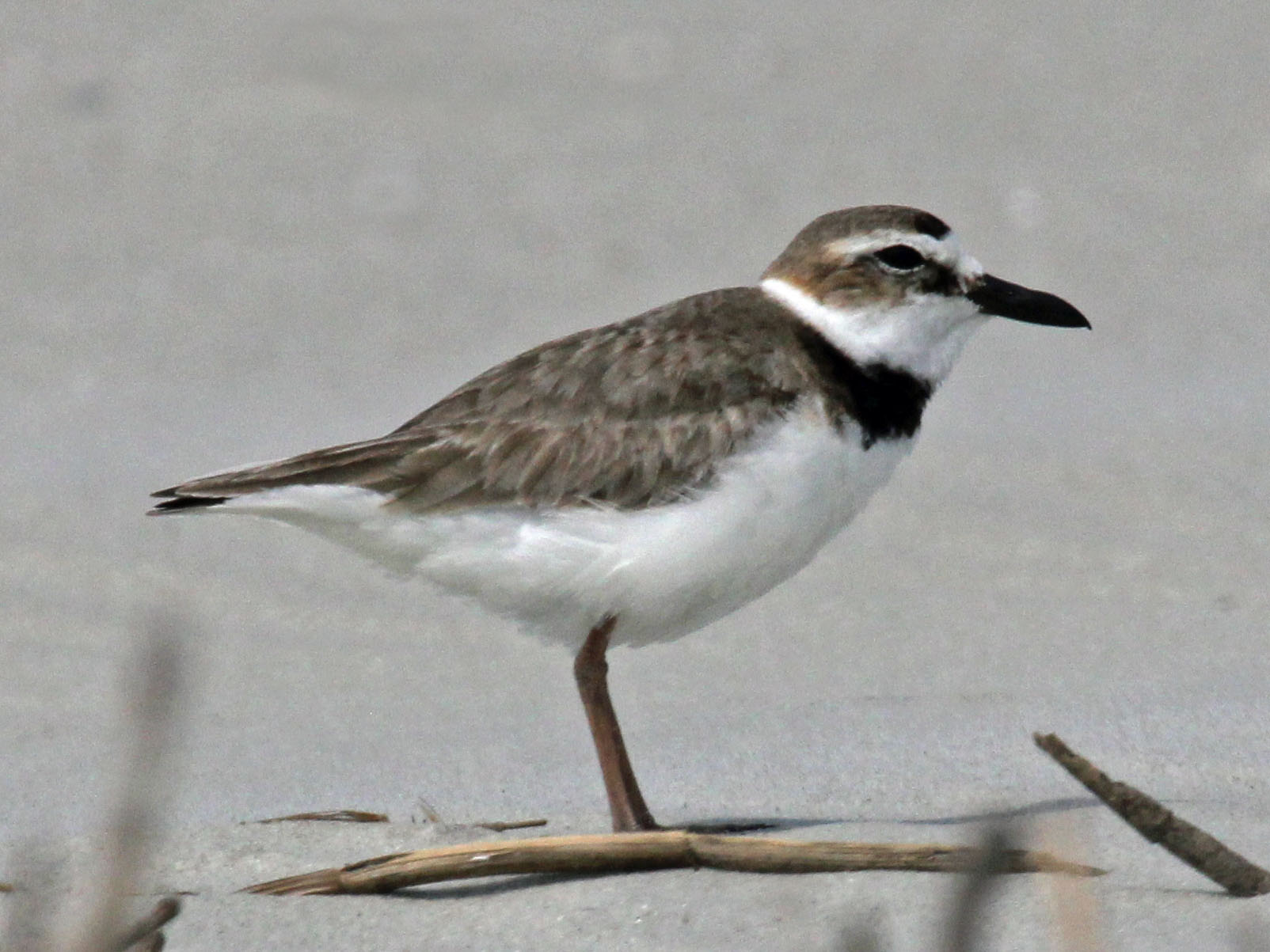
Playerito marítimo
(Charadrius wilsonia)

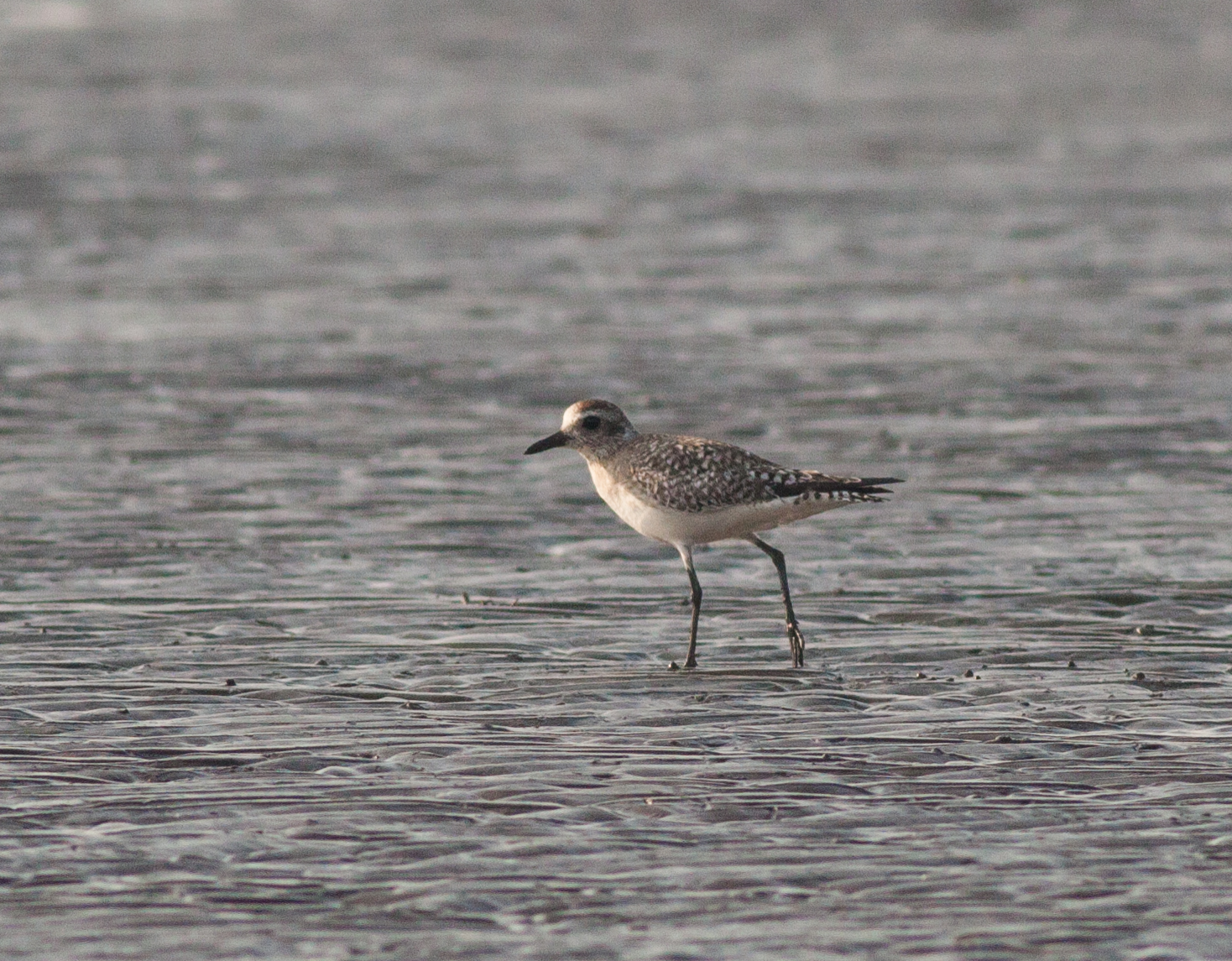
Playero cabezón
(Pluvialis squatarola)

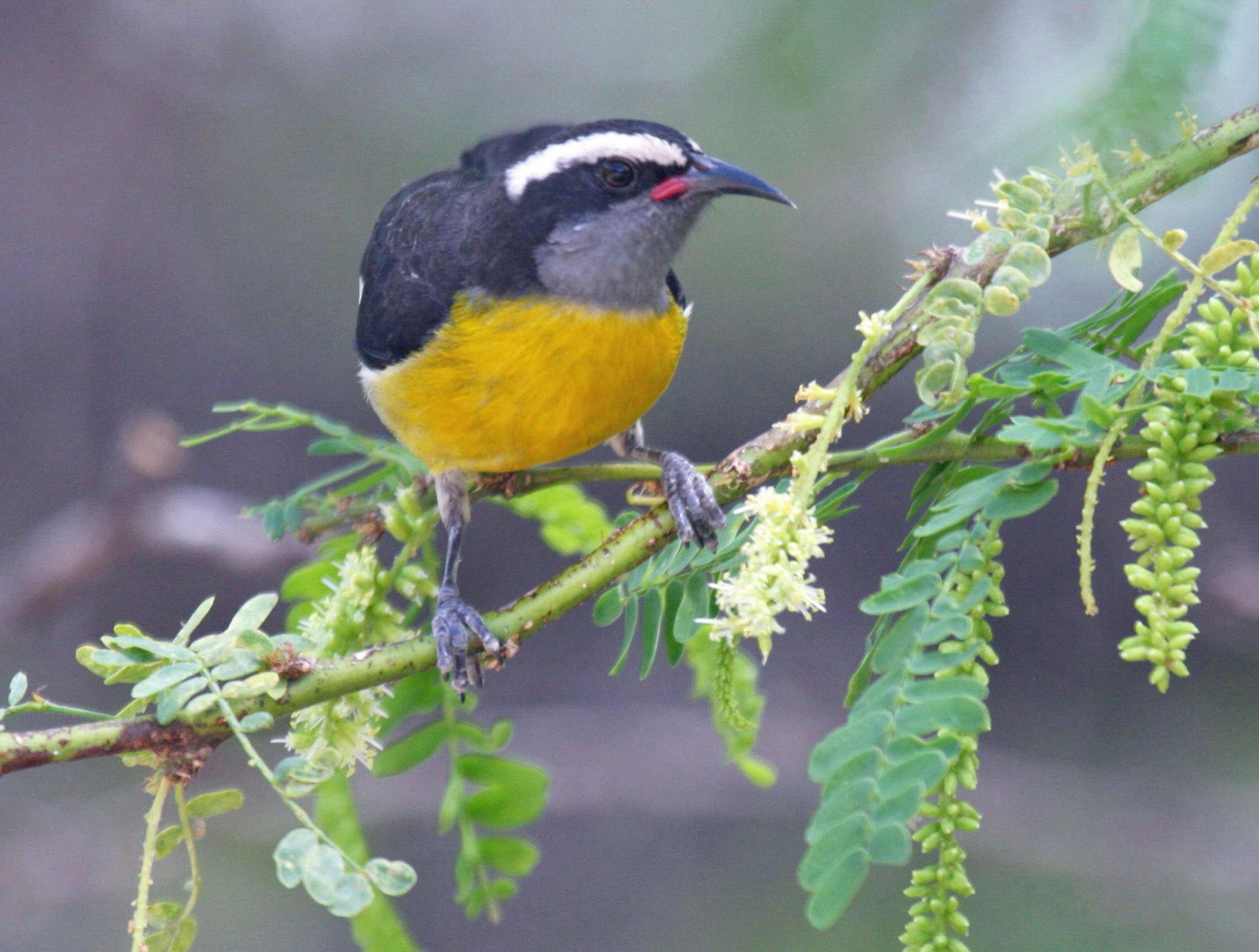
Reinita común
(Coereba flaveola)

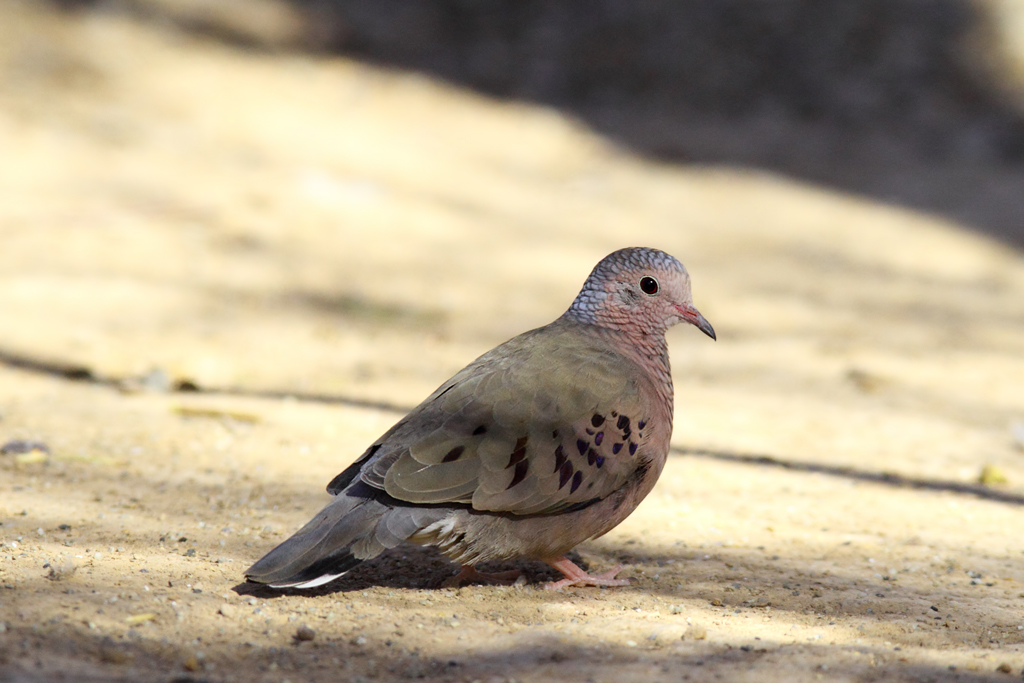
Rolita
(Columbina passerina)

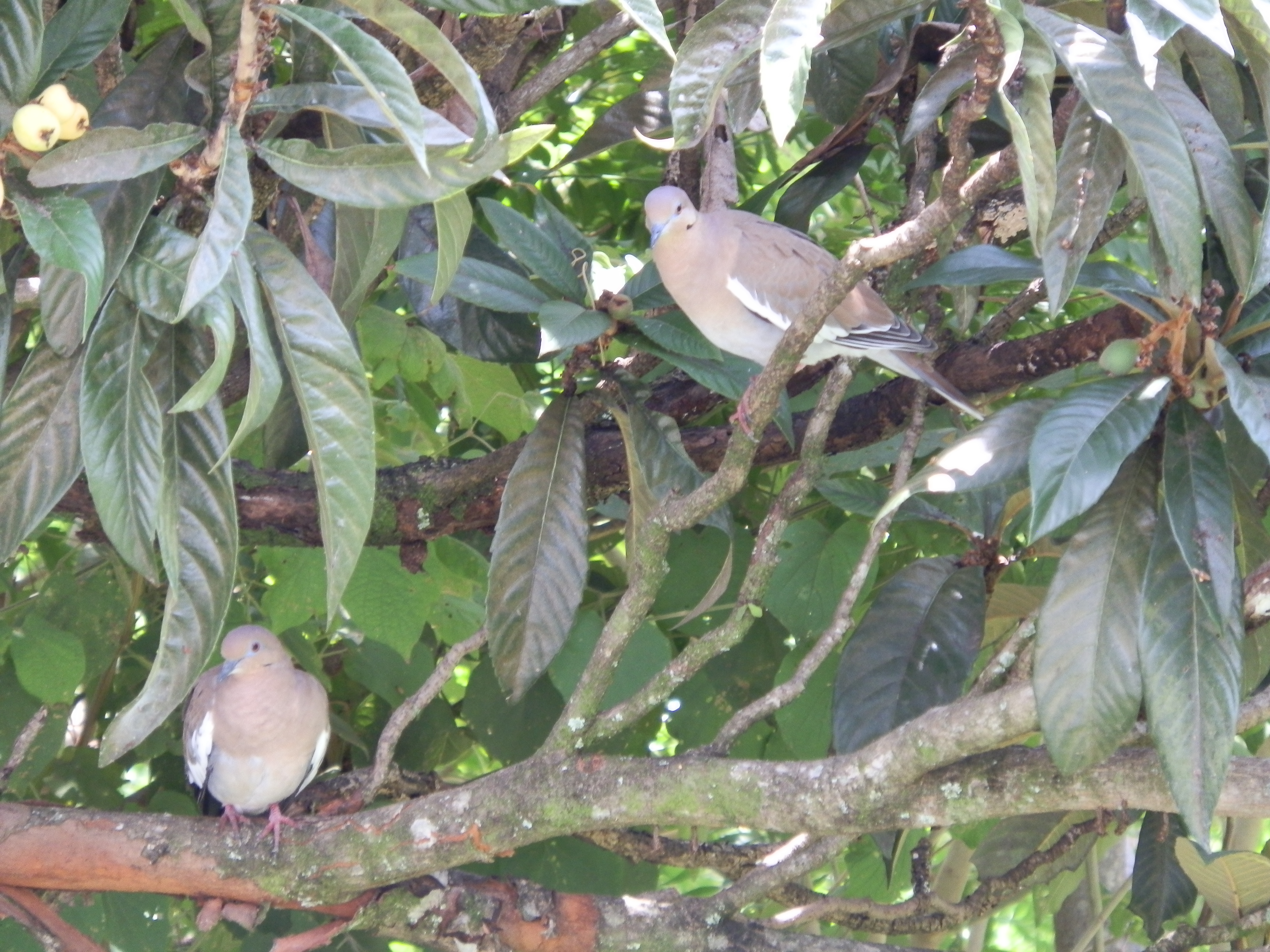
Tórtola aliblanca
(Zenaida asiatica)

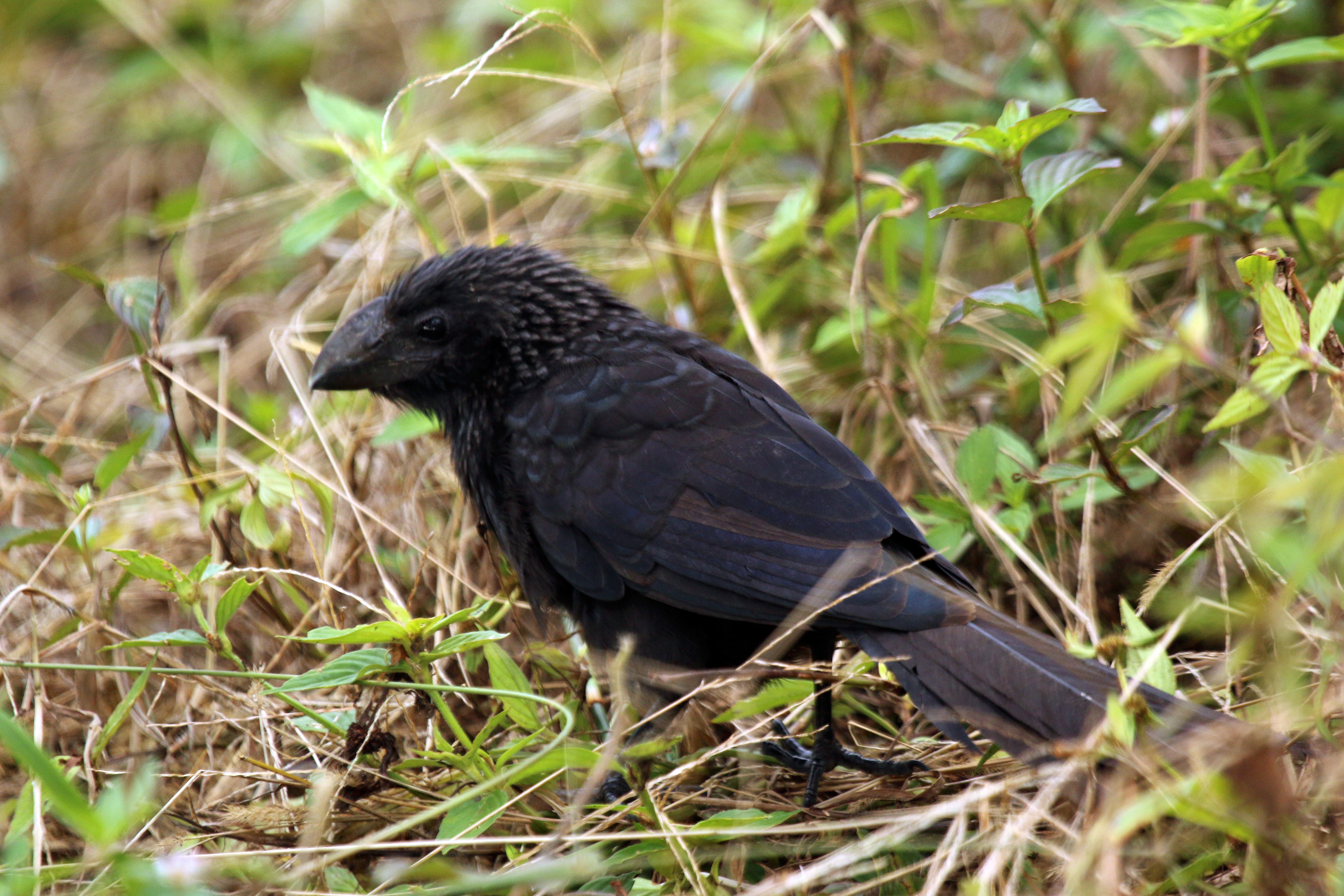
Judío
(Crotophaga ani)

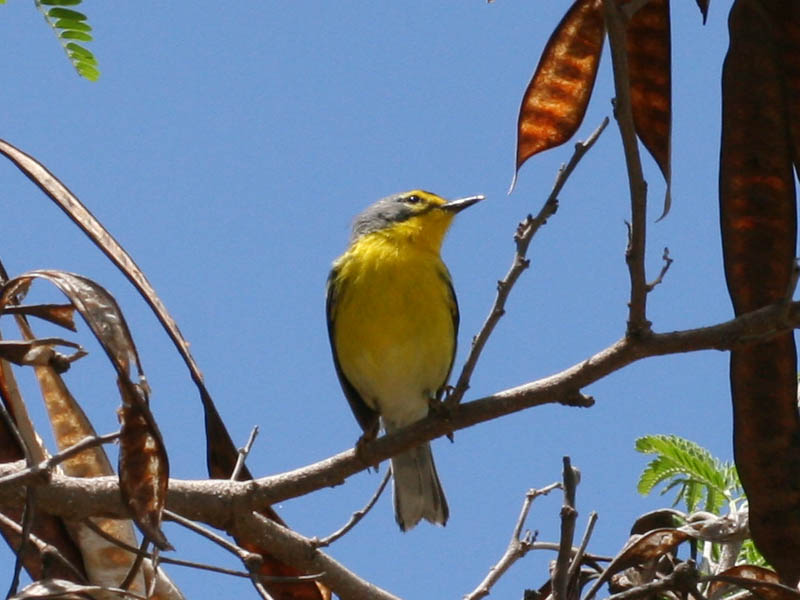
Reinita mariposera
(Dendroica adelaidae)

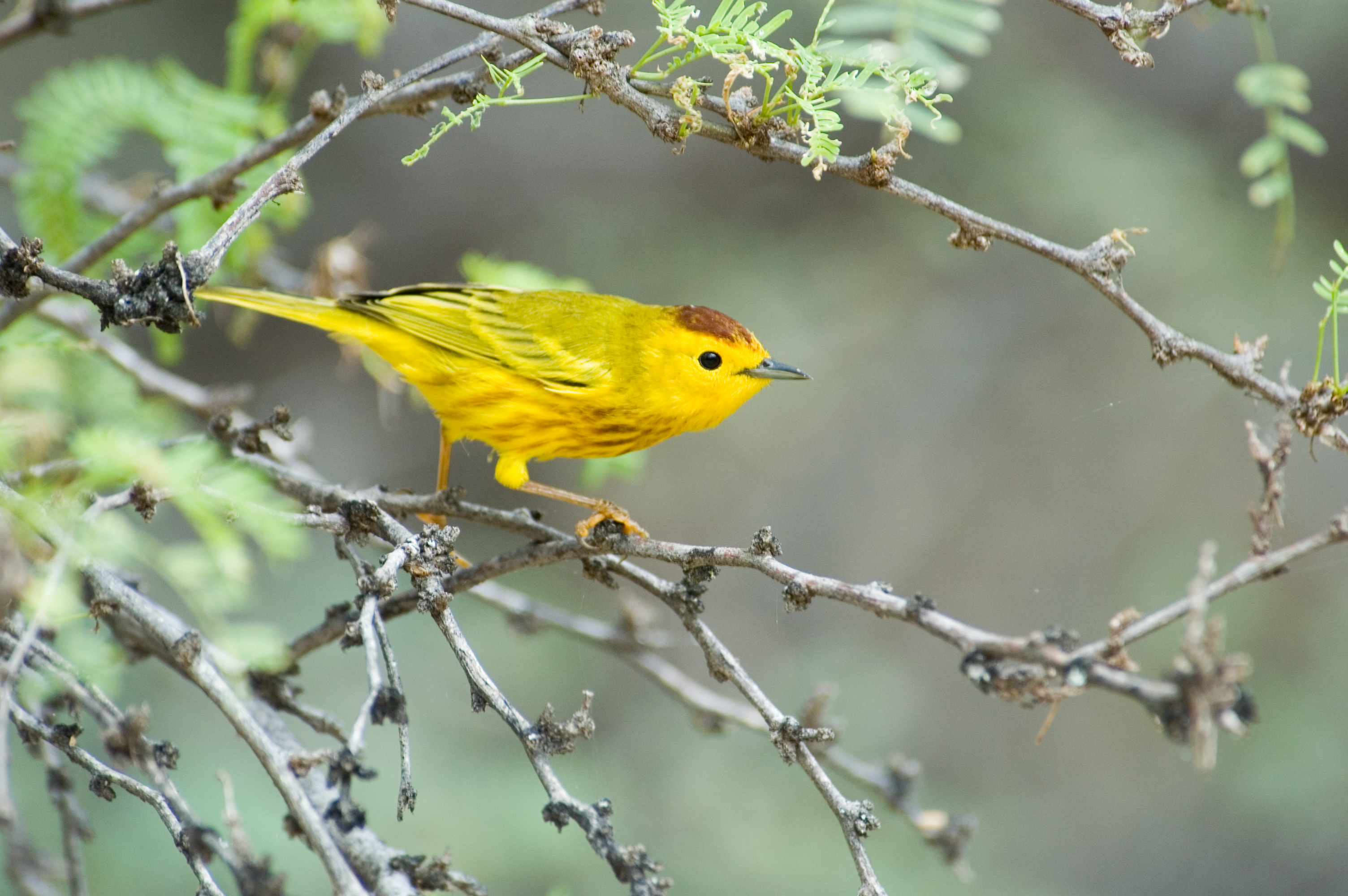
Canario de mangle
(Dendroica petechia)

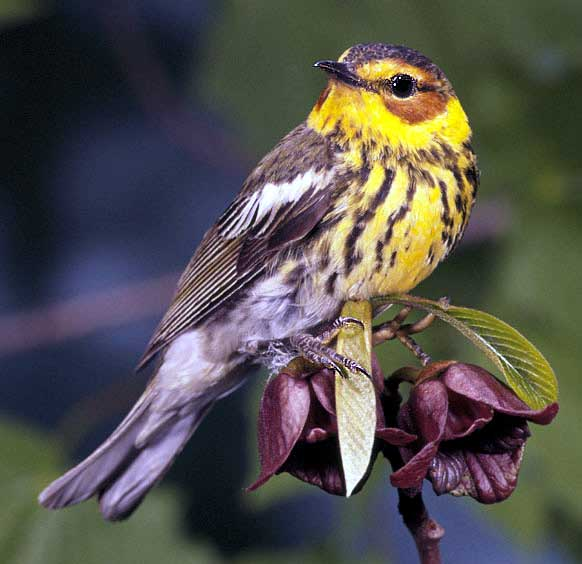
Reinita tigre
(Dendroica tigrina)

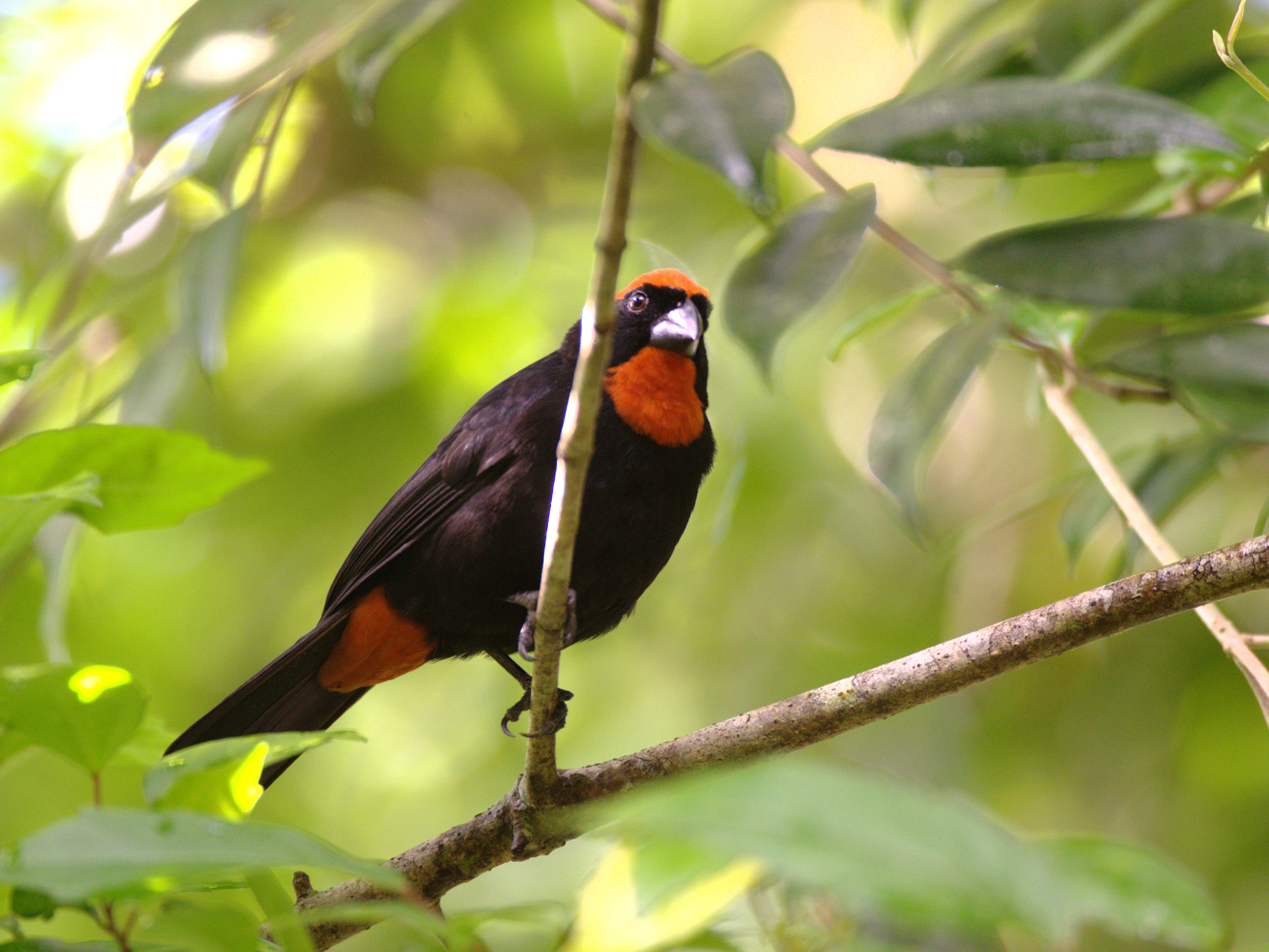
Comeñame
(Loxigilla portoricensis)

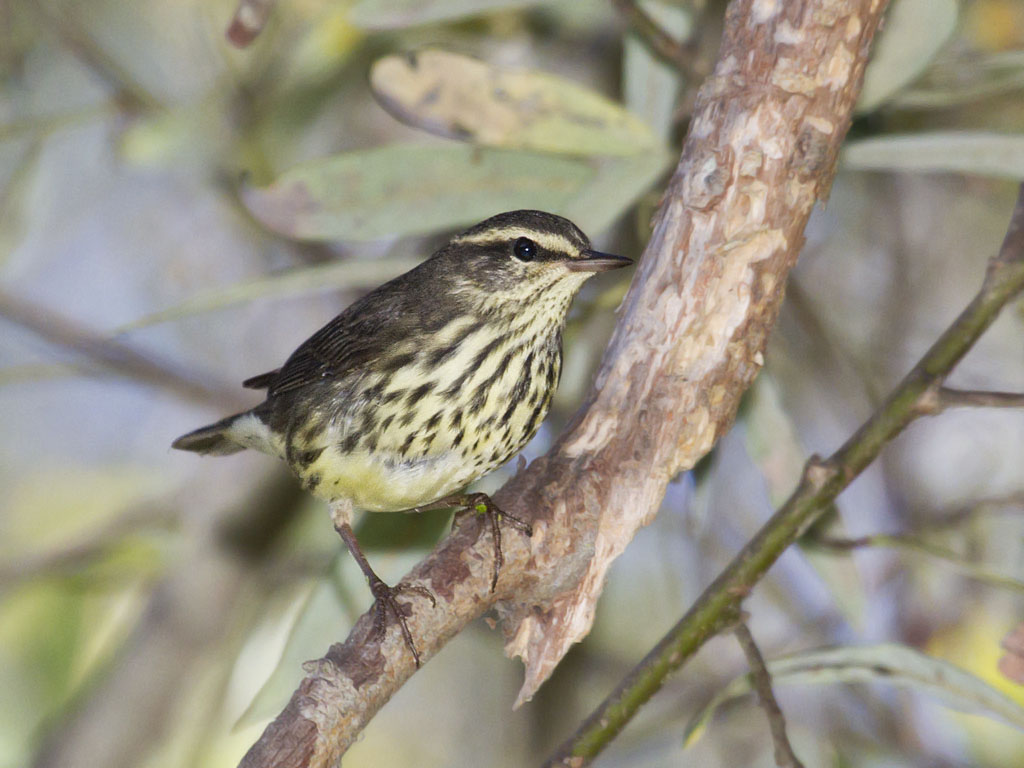
Pizpita de mangle
(Seiurus noveboracensis)

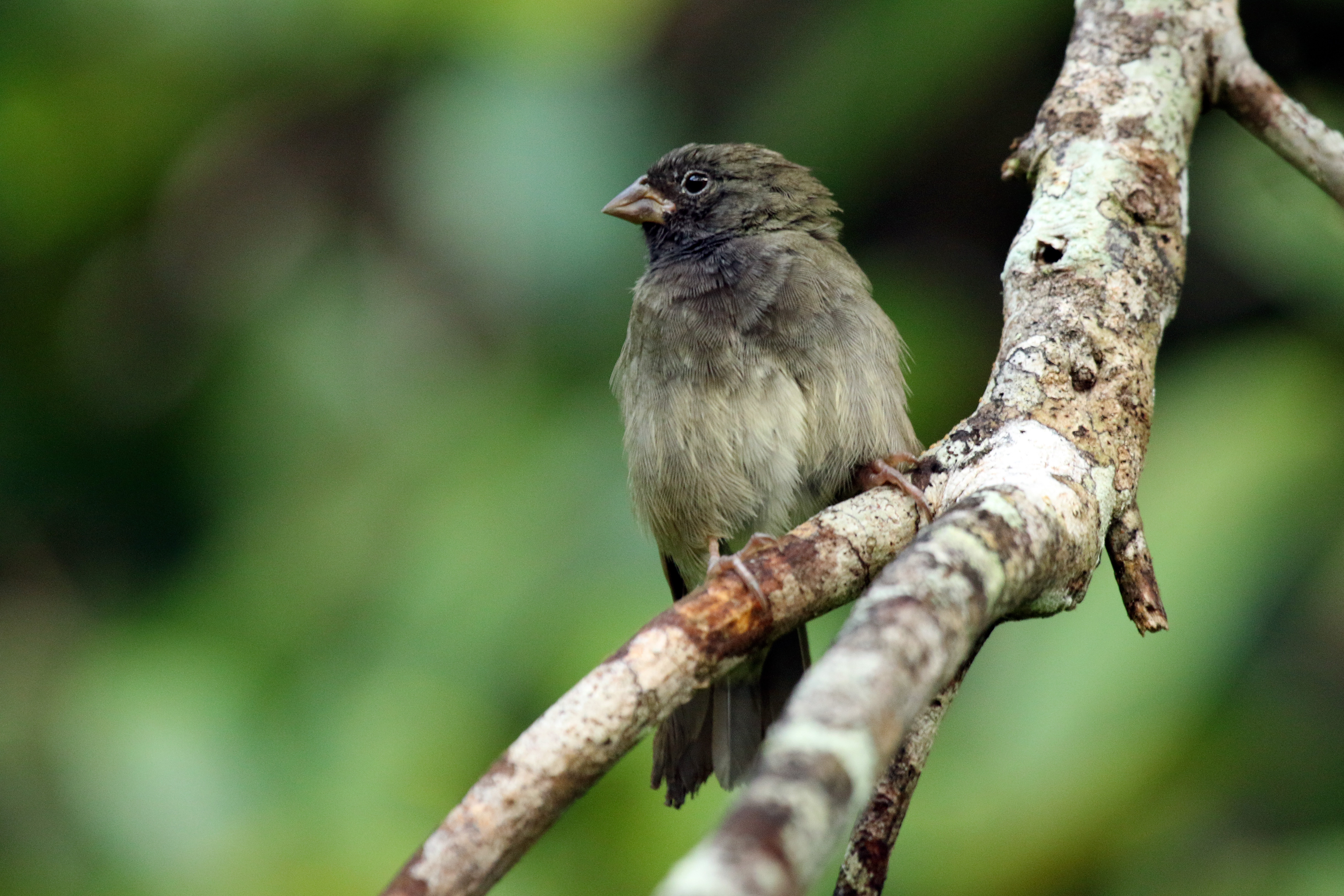
Gorrión negro
(Tiaris bicolor)

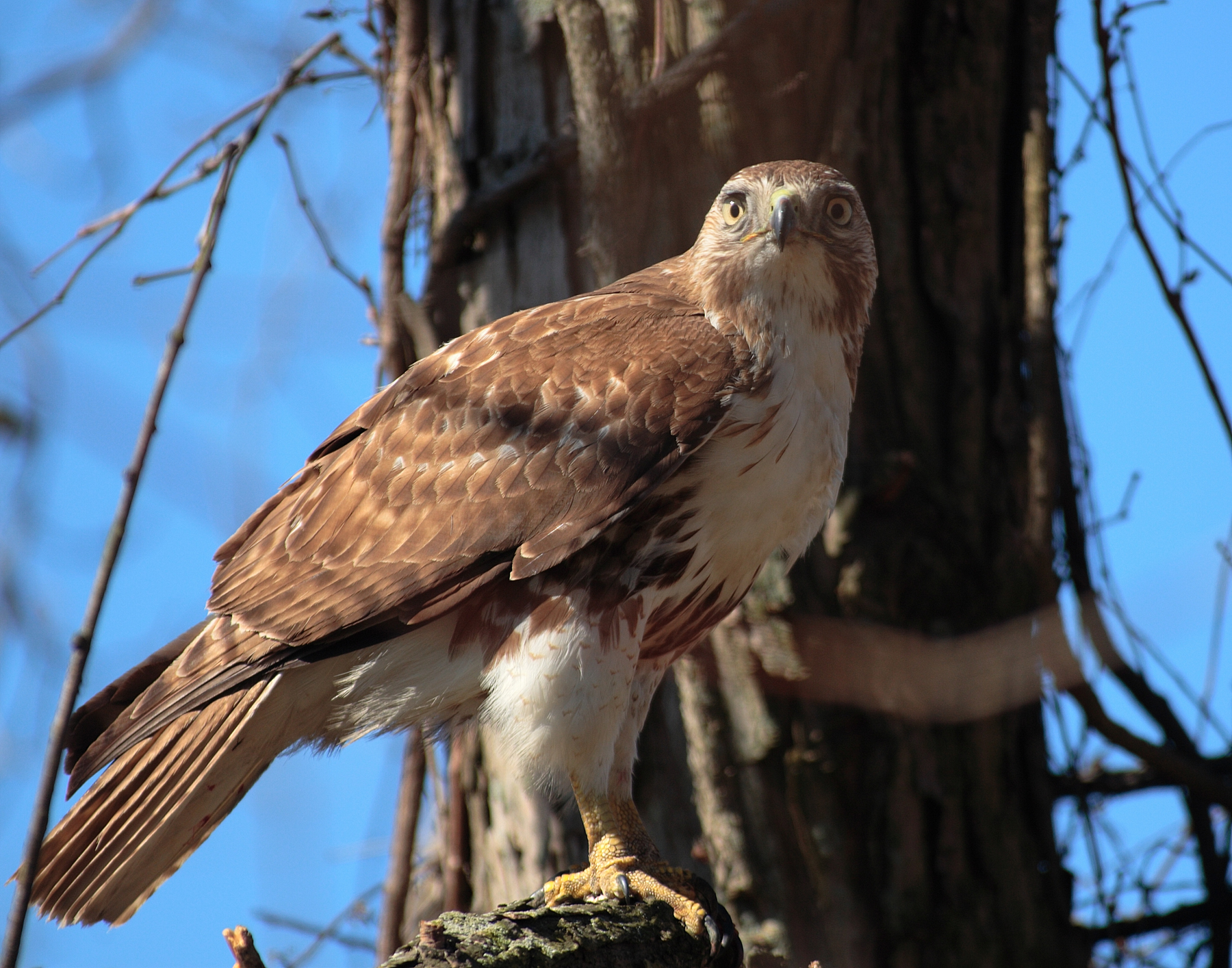
Guaraguao
(Buteo jamaicensis)

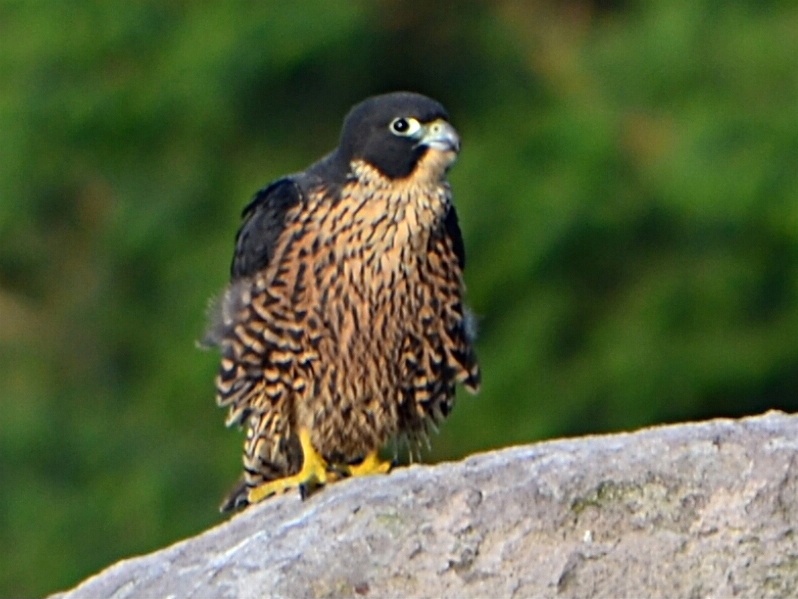
Halcón peregrino
(Falco peregrinus)

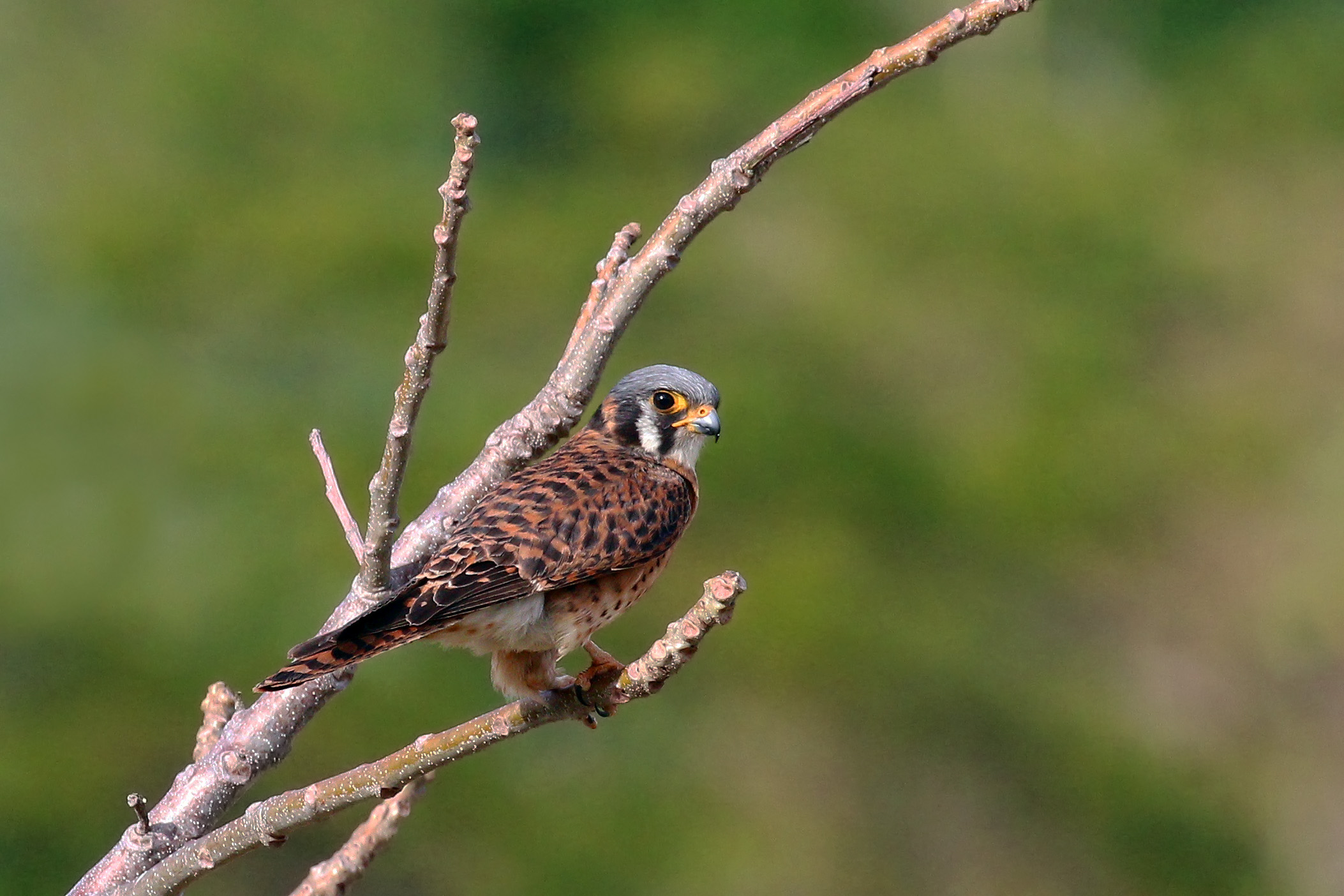
Falcón común
(Falco sparverius)

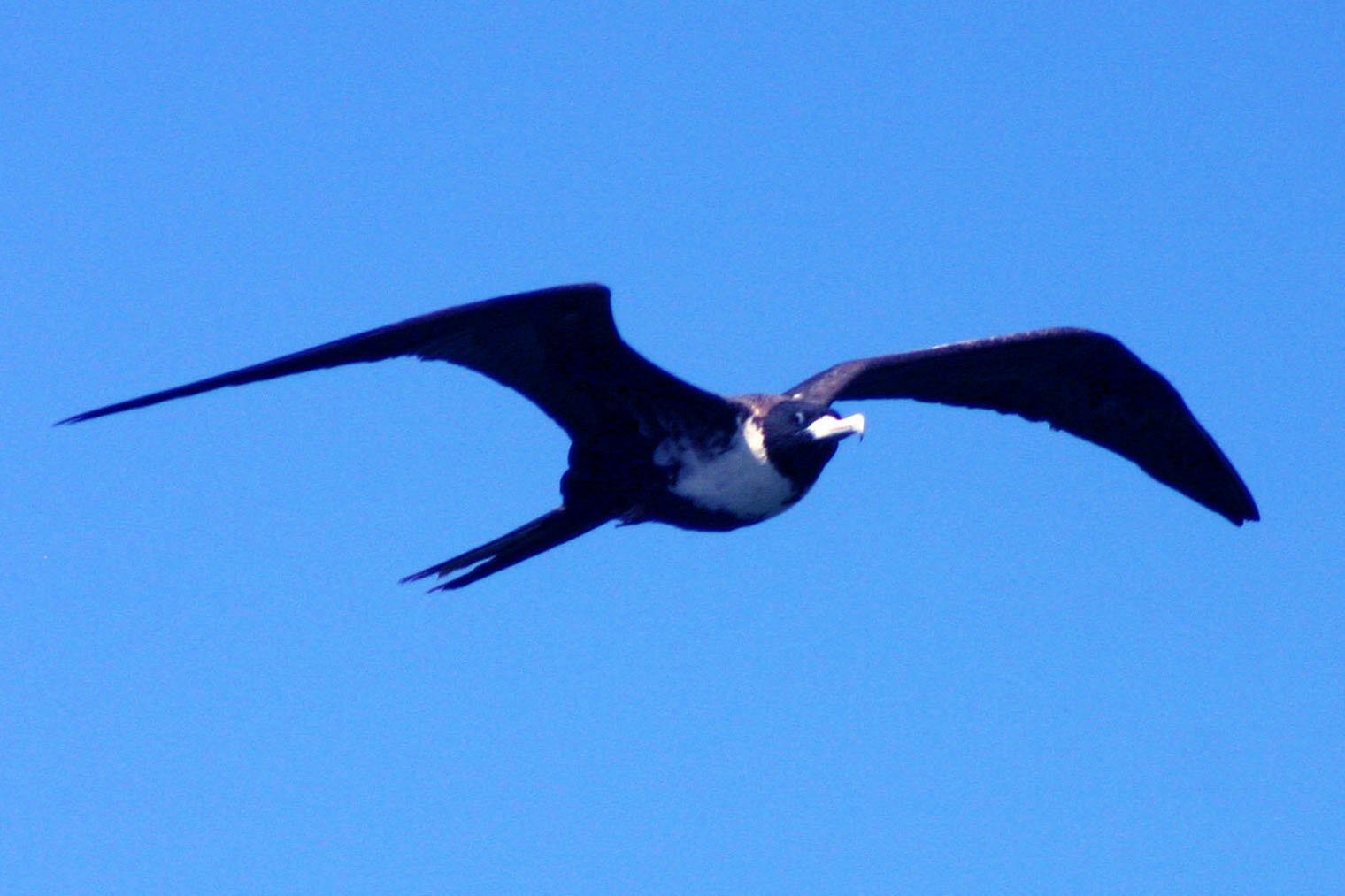
Tijereta de mar
(Fregata magnificens)

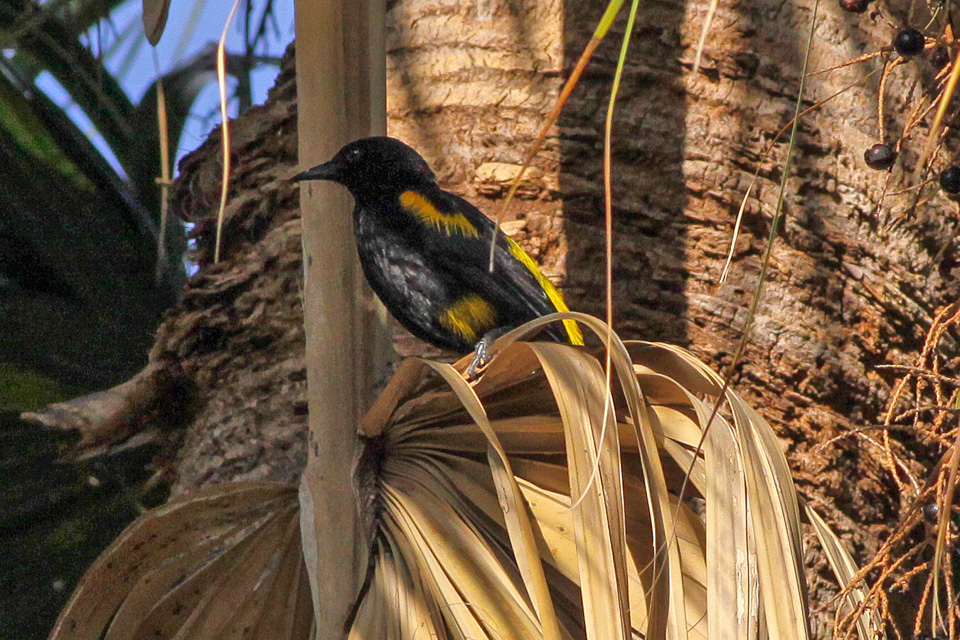
Calandria
(Icterus dominicensis)

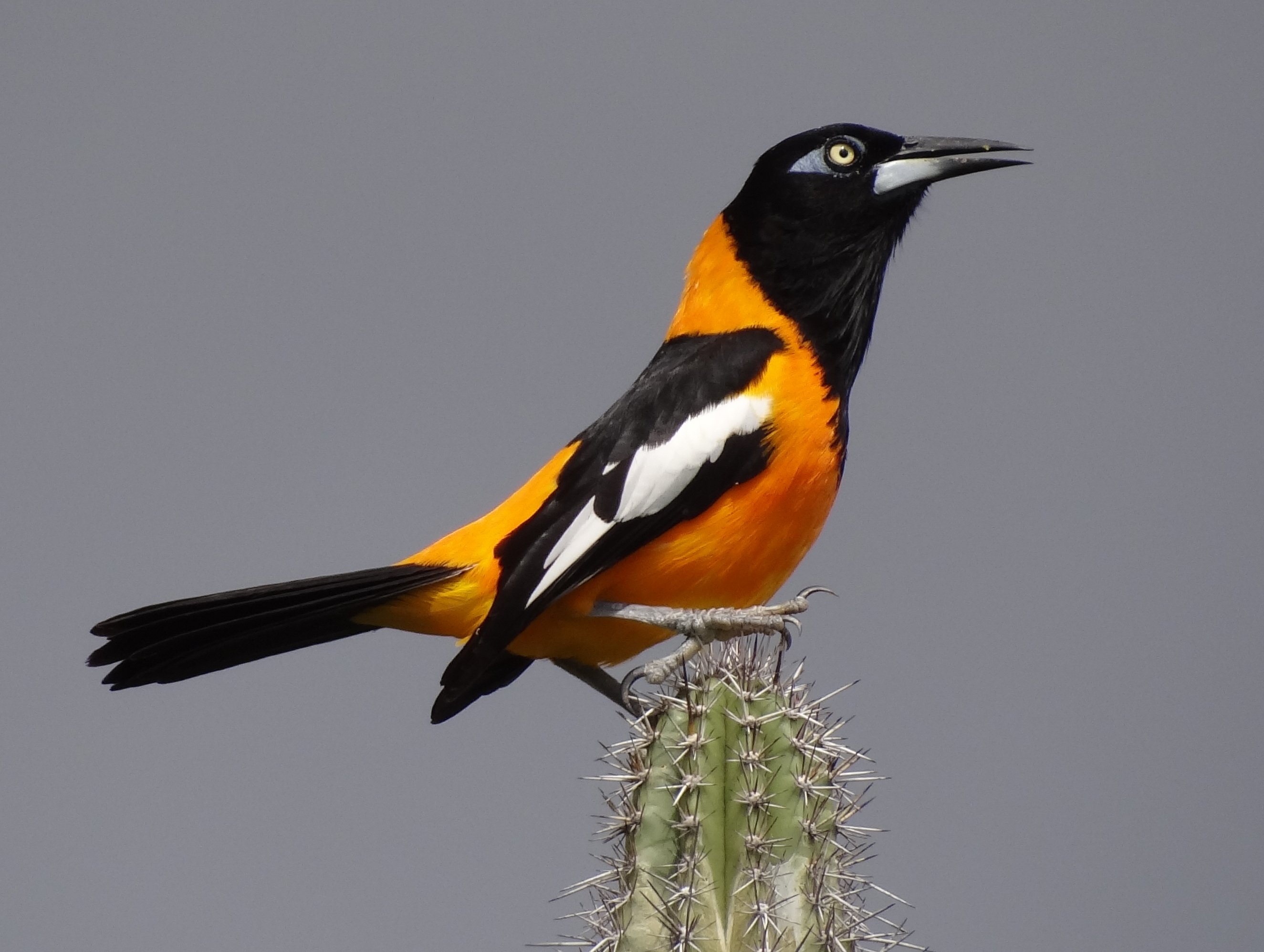
Turpial
(Icterus icterus)

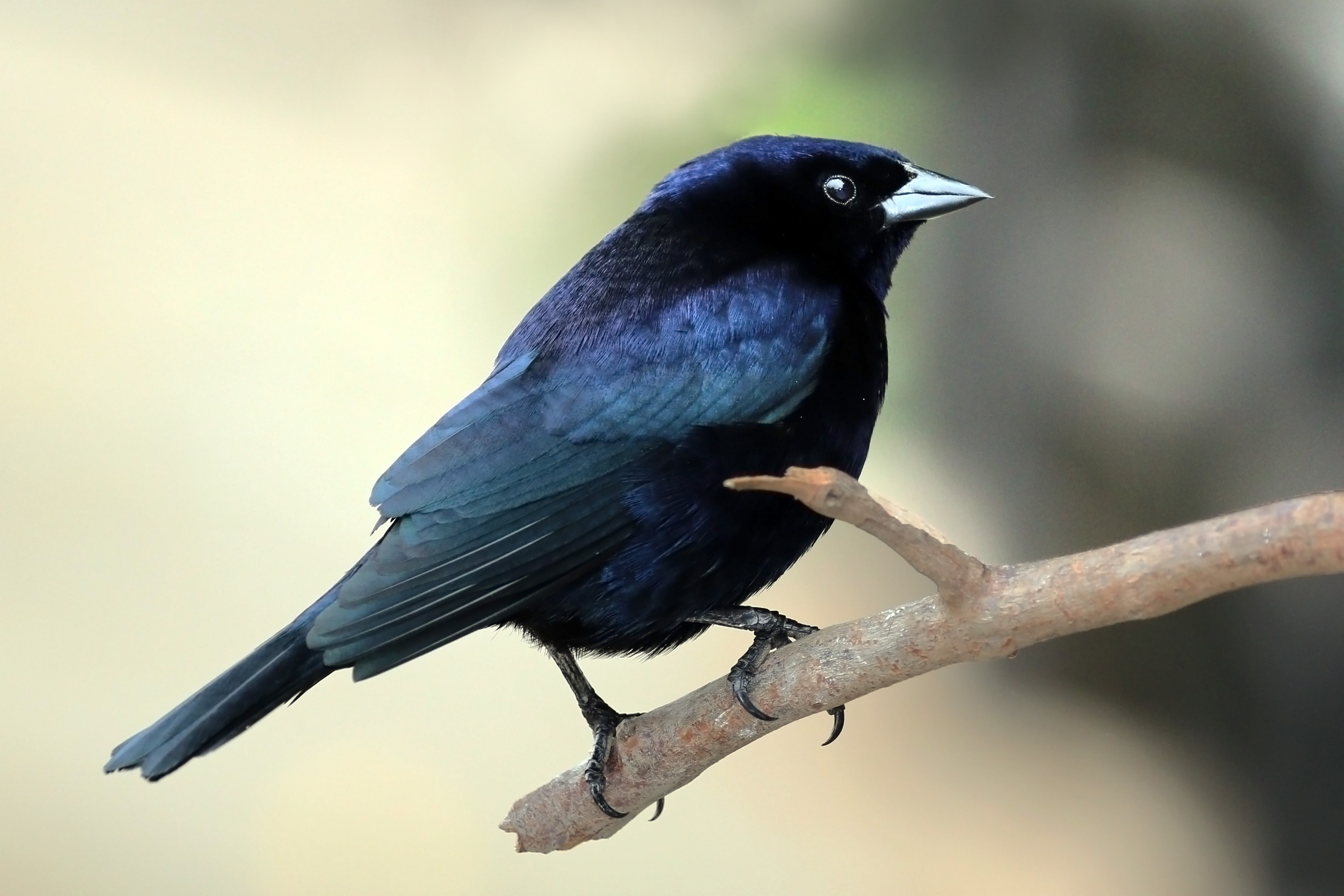
Tordo lustroso
(Molothrus bonariensis)

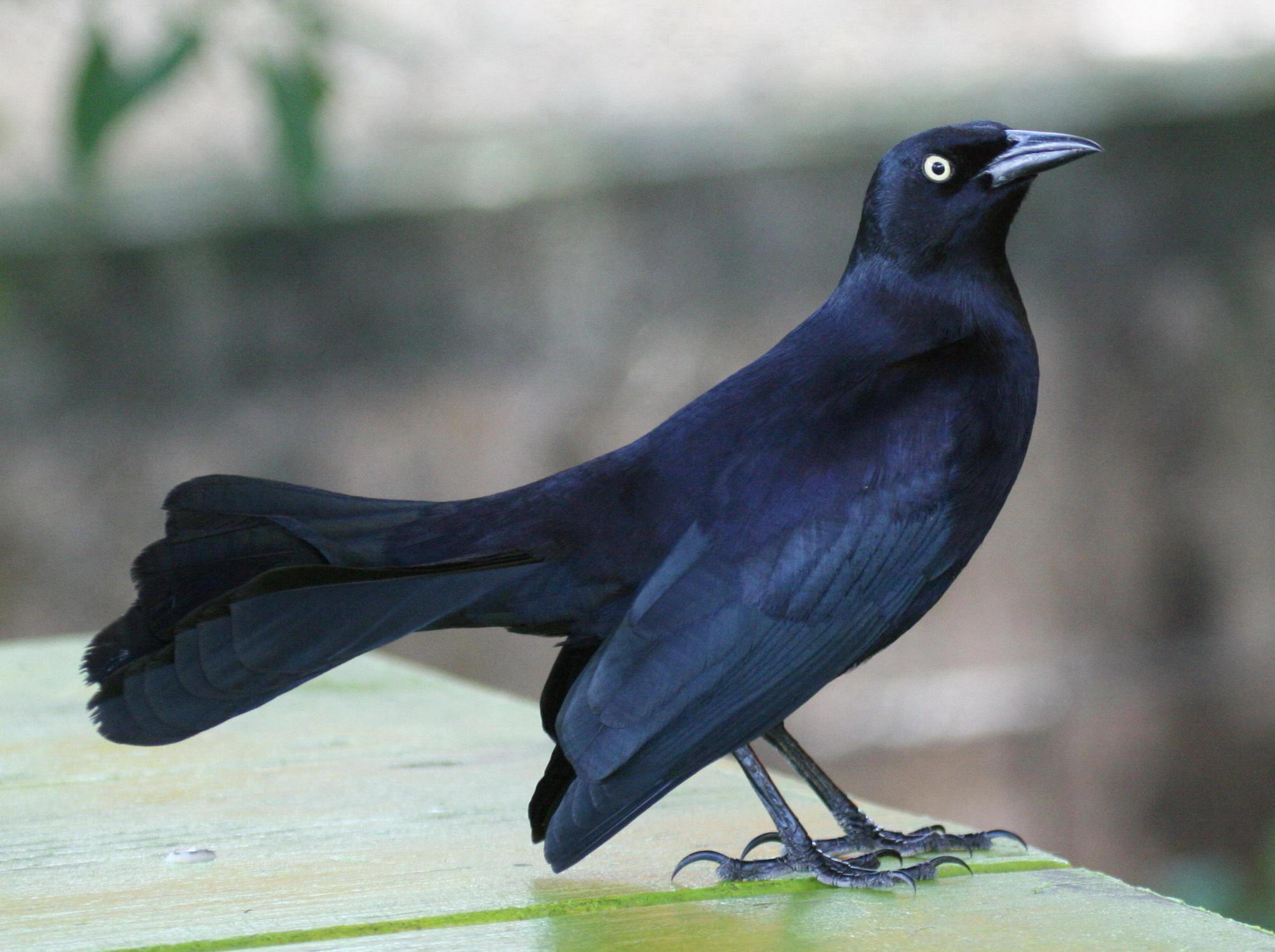
Chango
(Quiscalus niger)

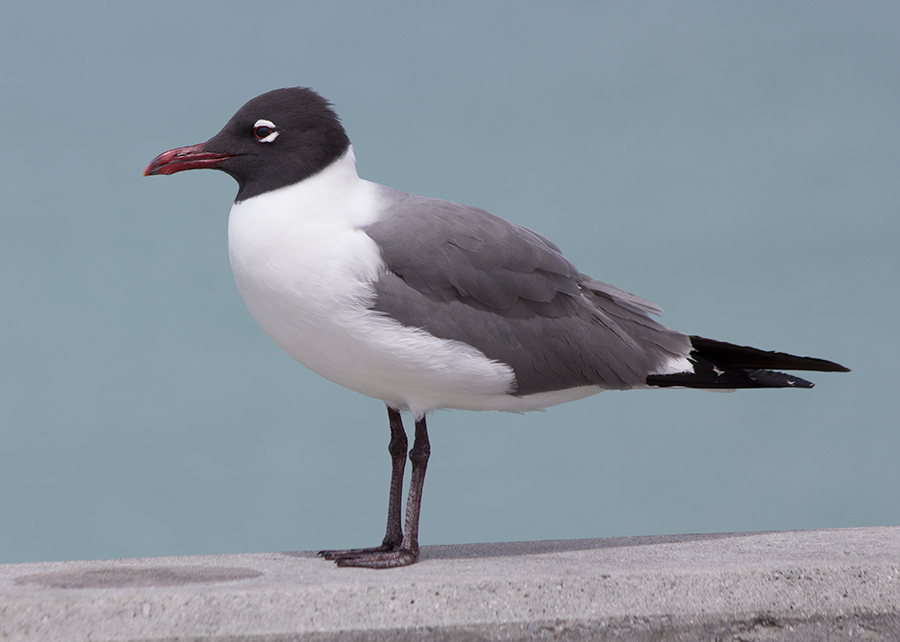
Gaviota gallega
(Larus atricilla)

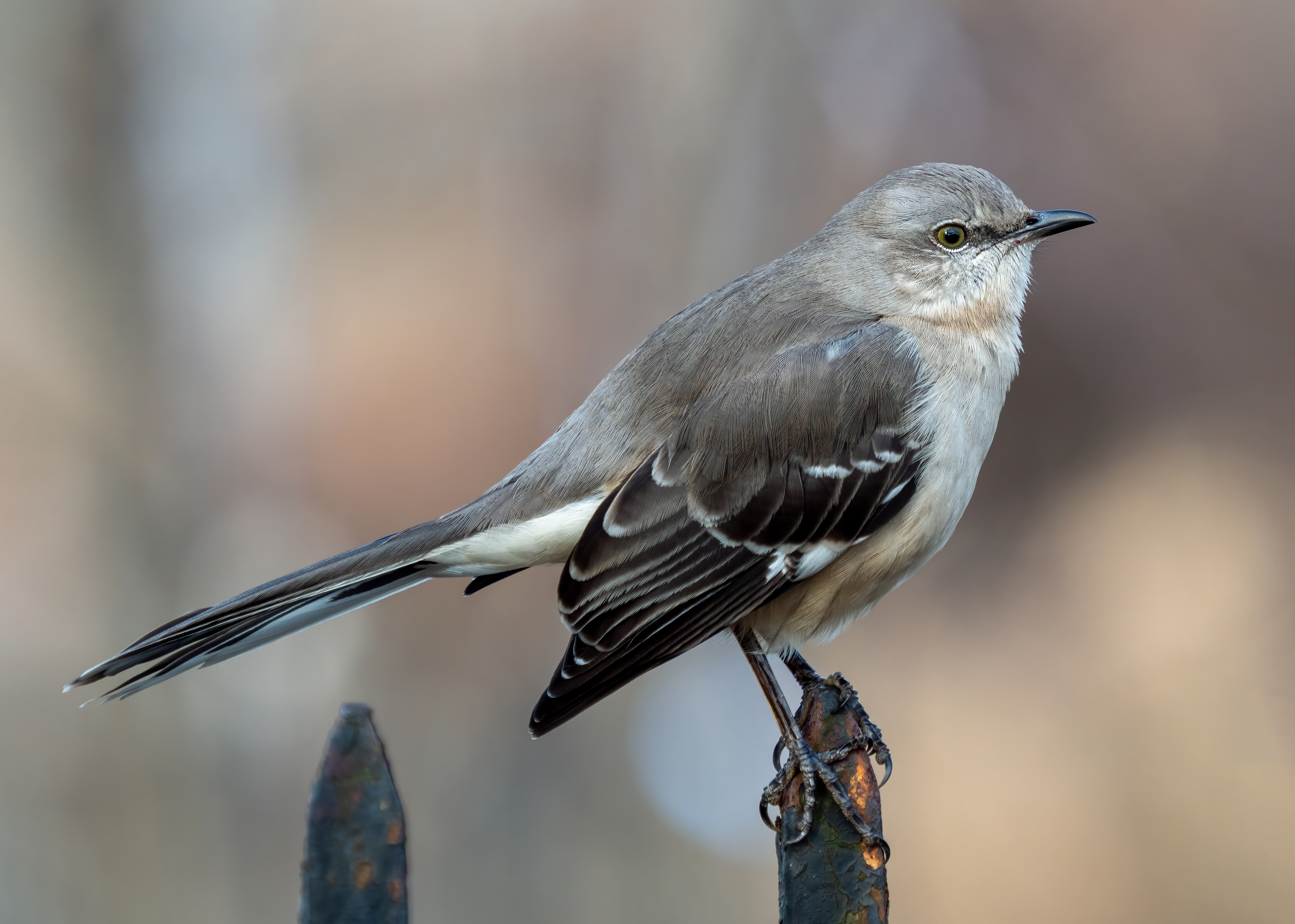
Ruiseñor
(Mimus polyglottos)

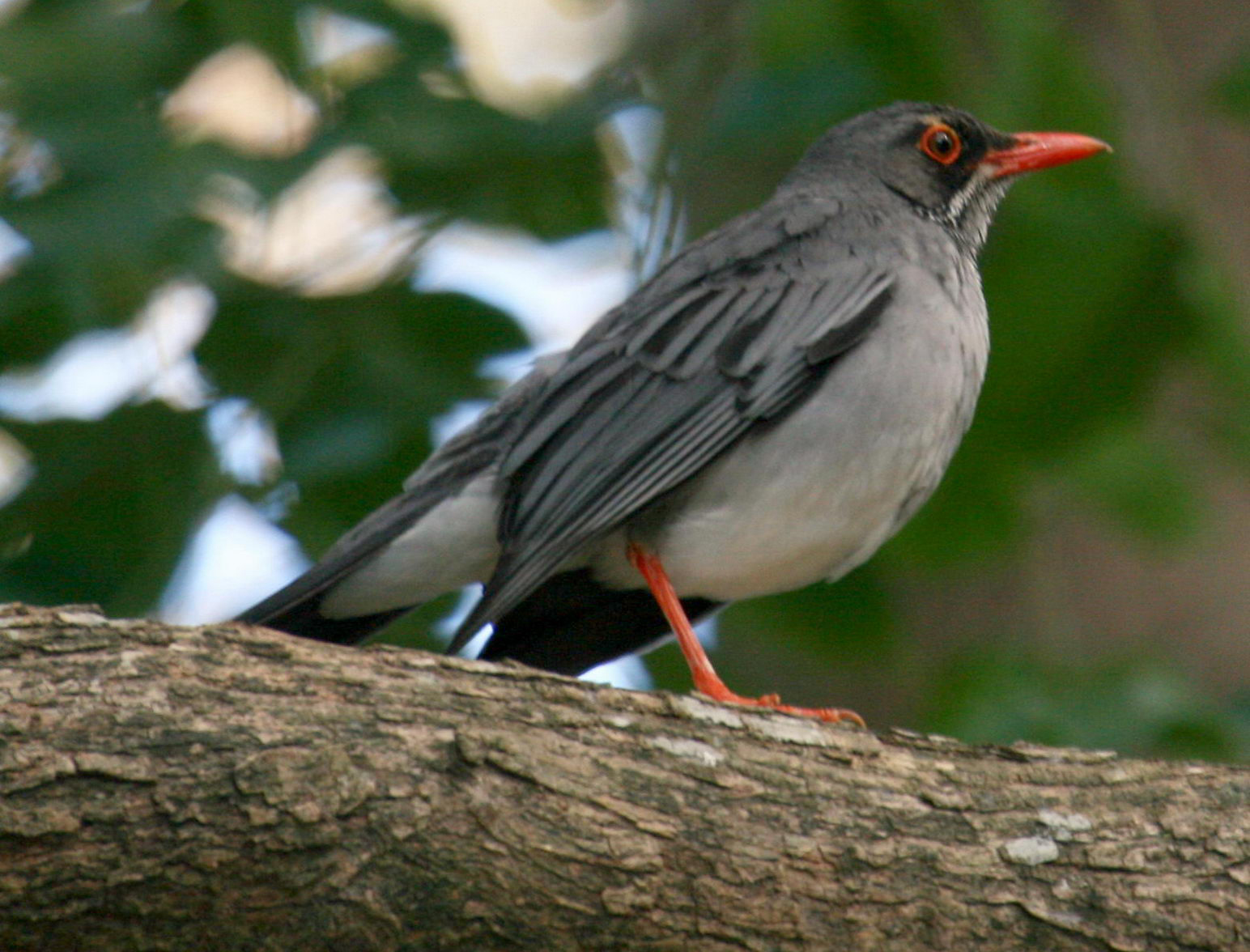
Zorzal de patas coloradas
(Turdus plumbeus)

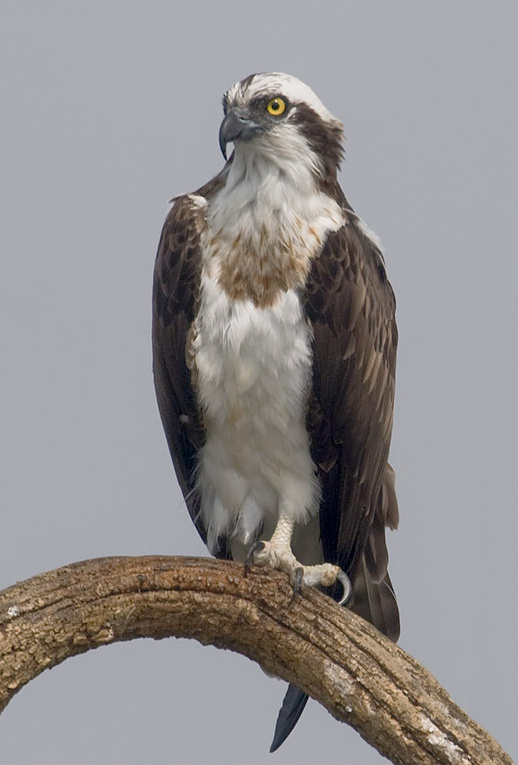
águila de mar
(Pandion haliaetus)

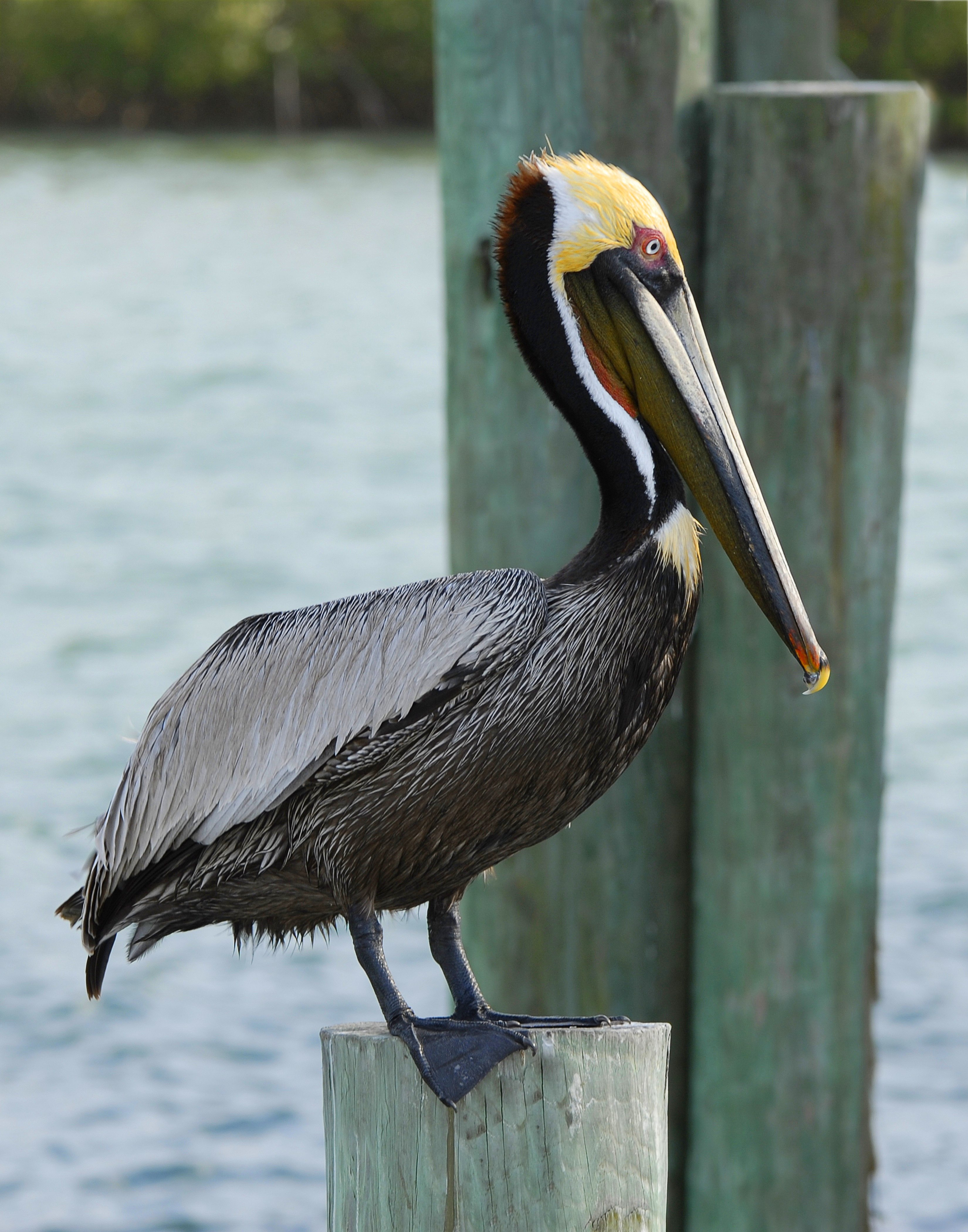
Pelicano pardo
(Pelecanus occidentalis)

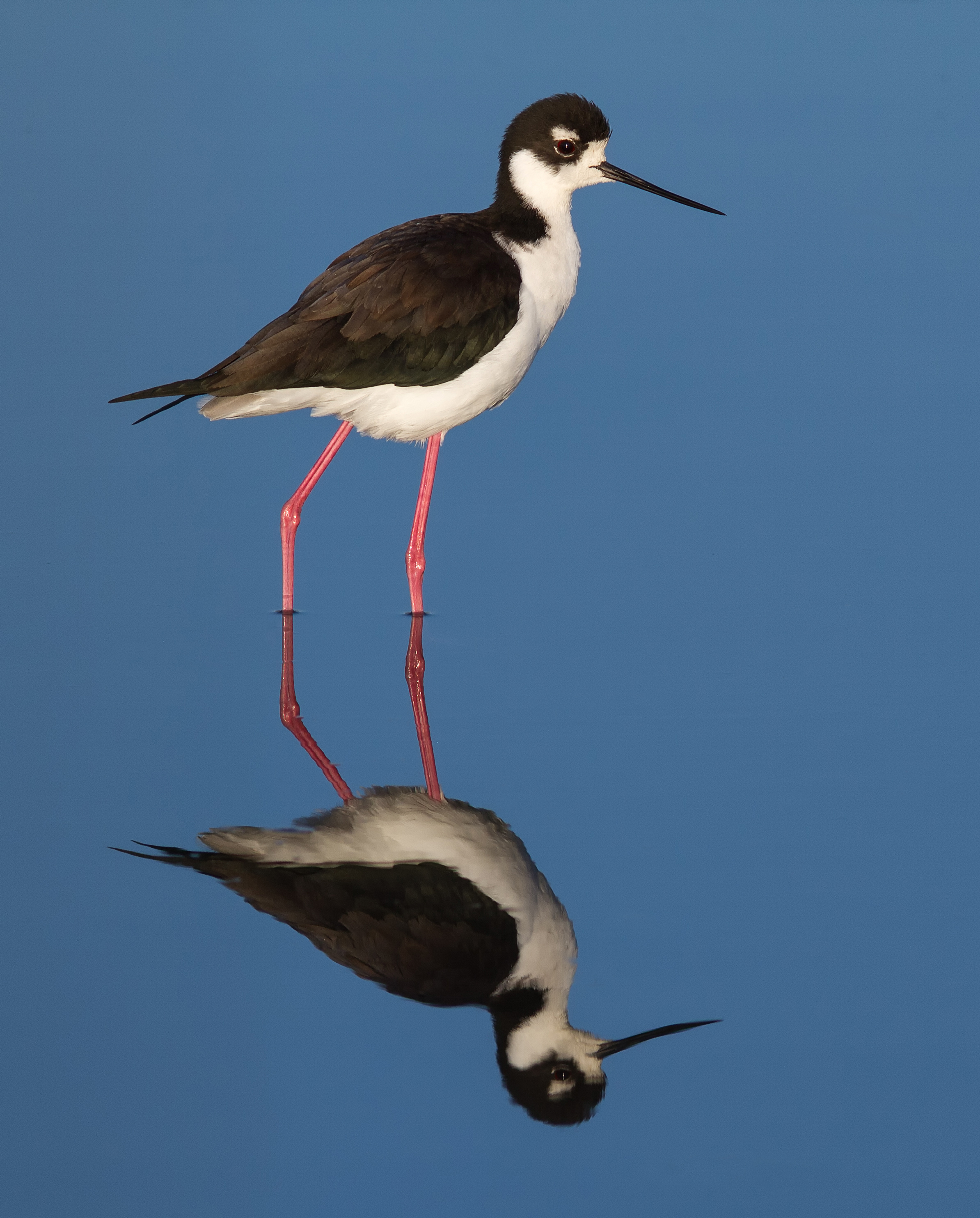
Viuda
(Himantopus mexicanus)

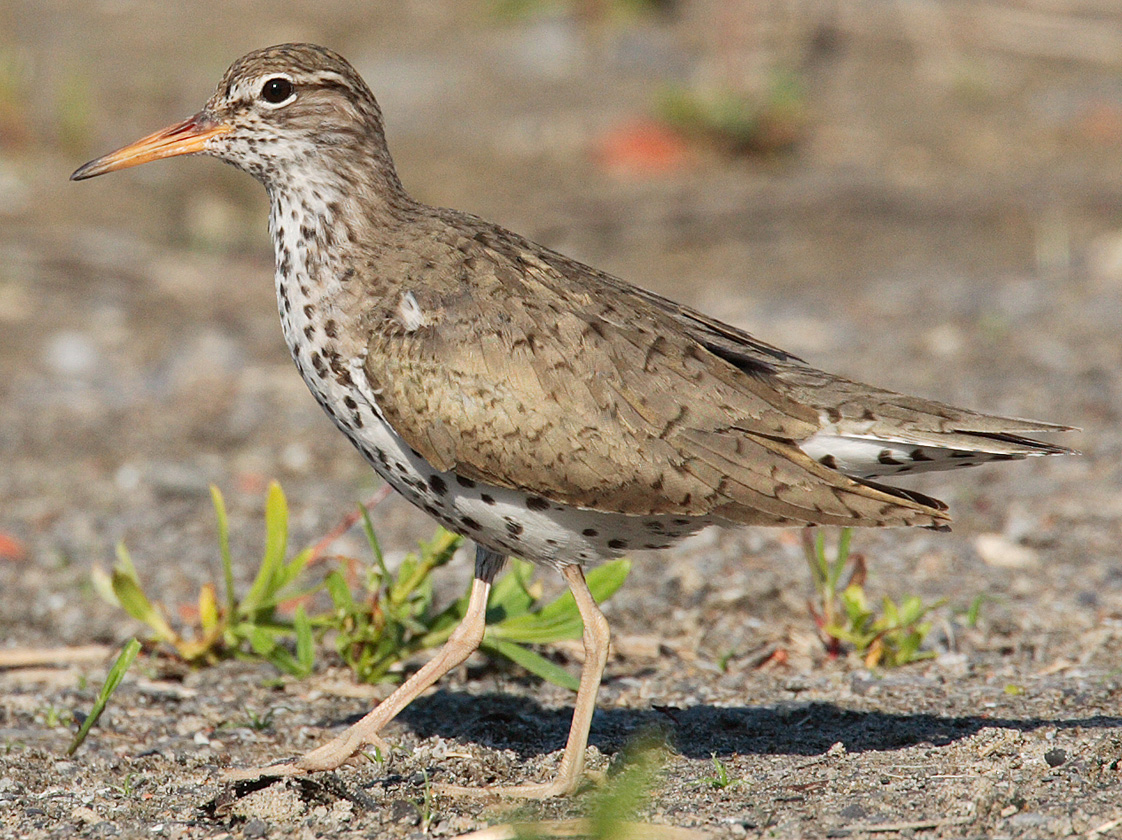
Playero coleador
(Actitis macularia)

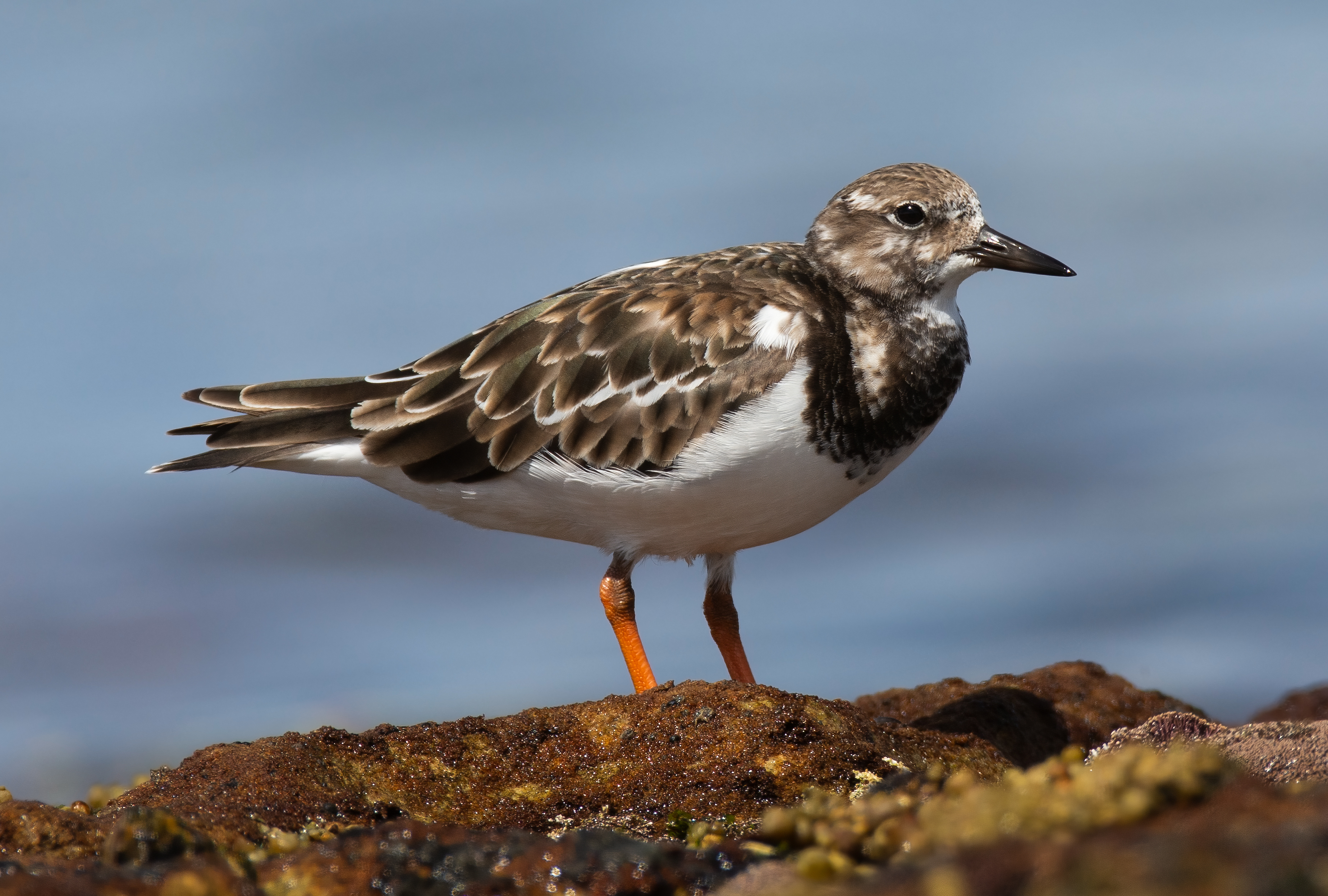
Playero Turco
(Arenaria interpres)

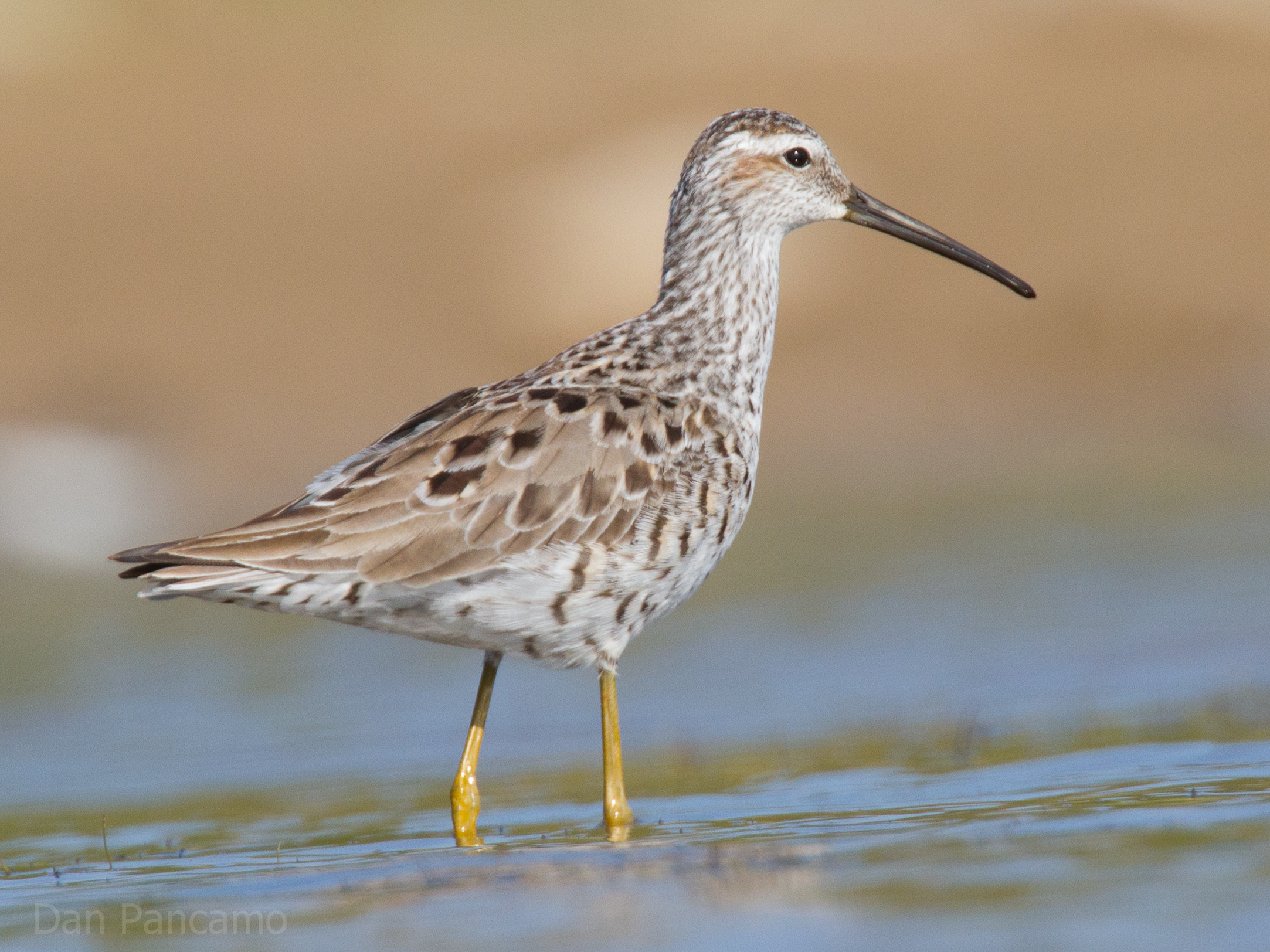
Playero patilargo
(Calidris himantopus)

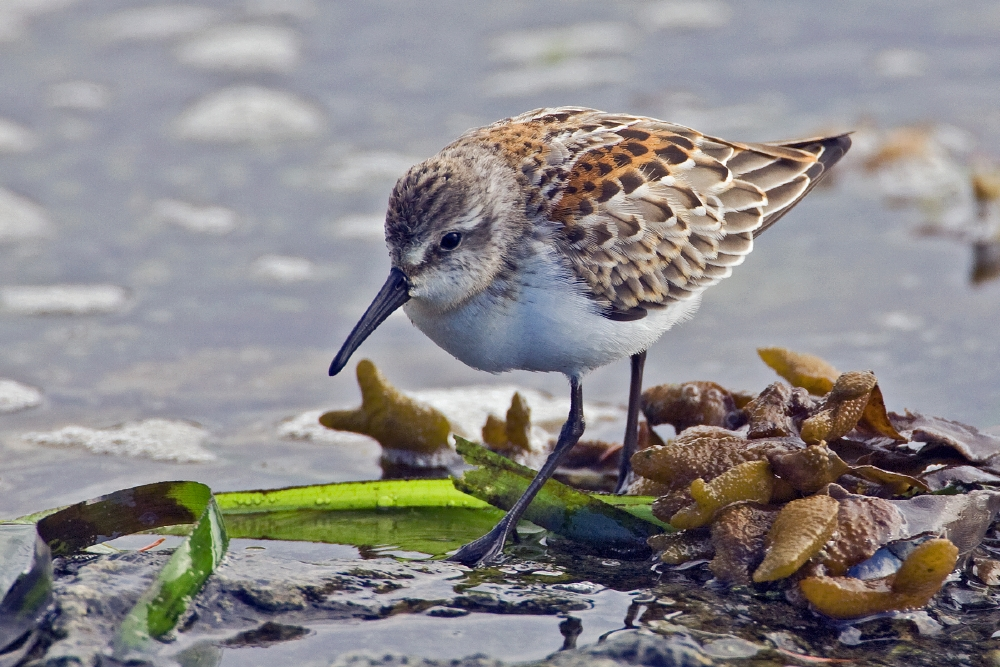
Playerito occidental
(Calidris mauri)

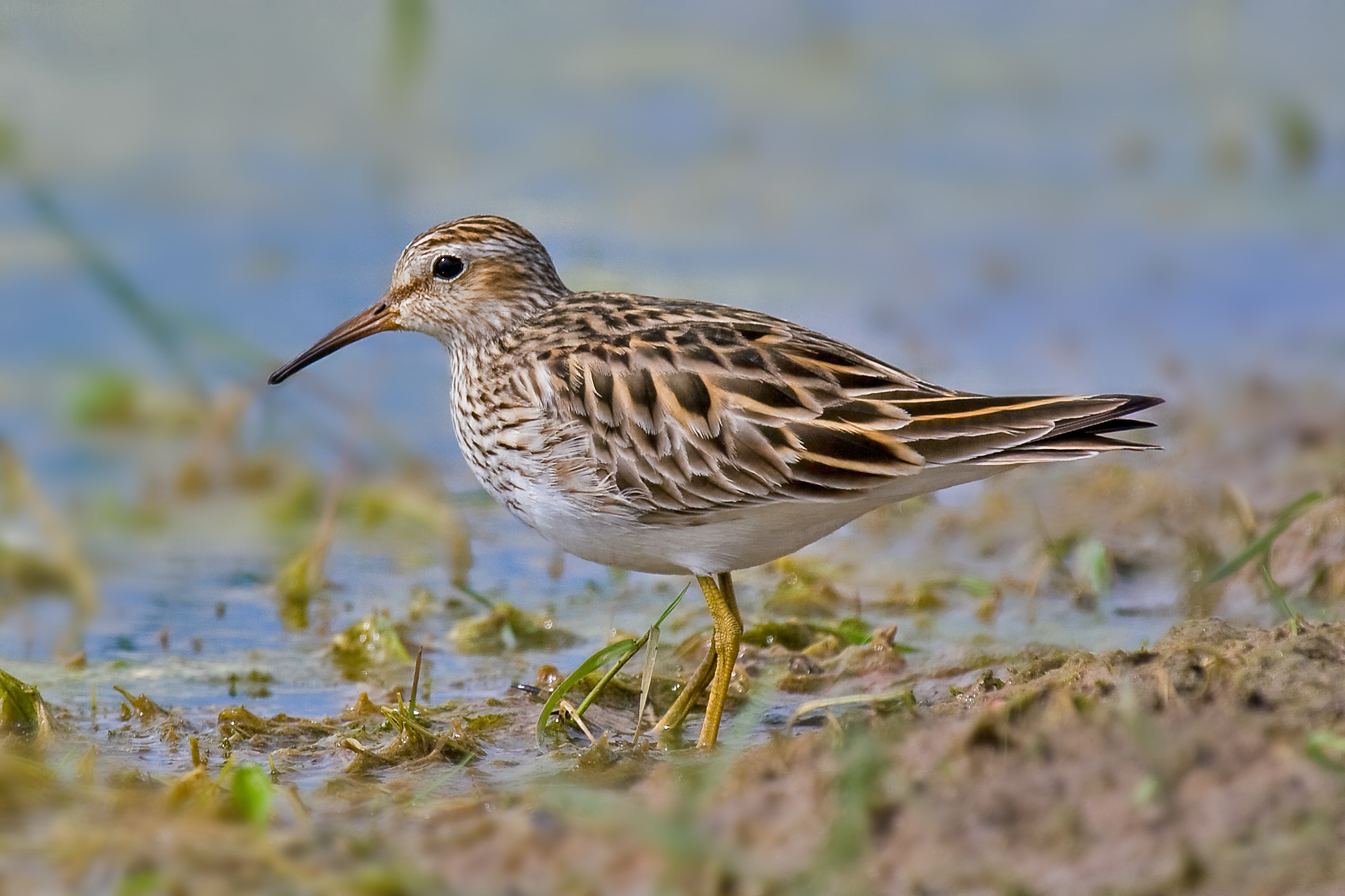
Playero manchado
(Calidris melanotos)

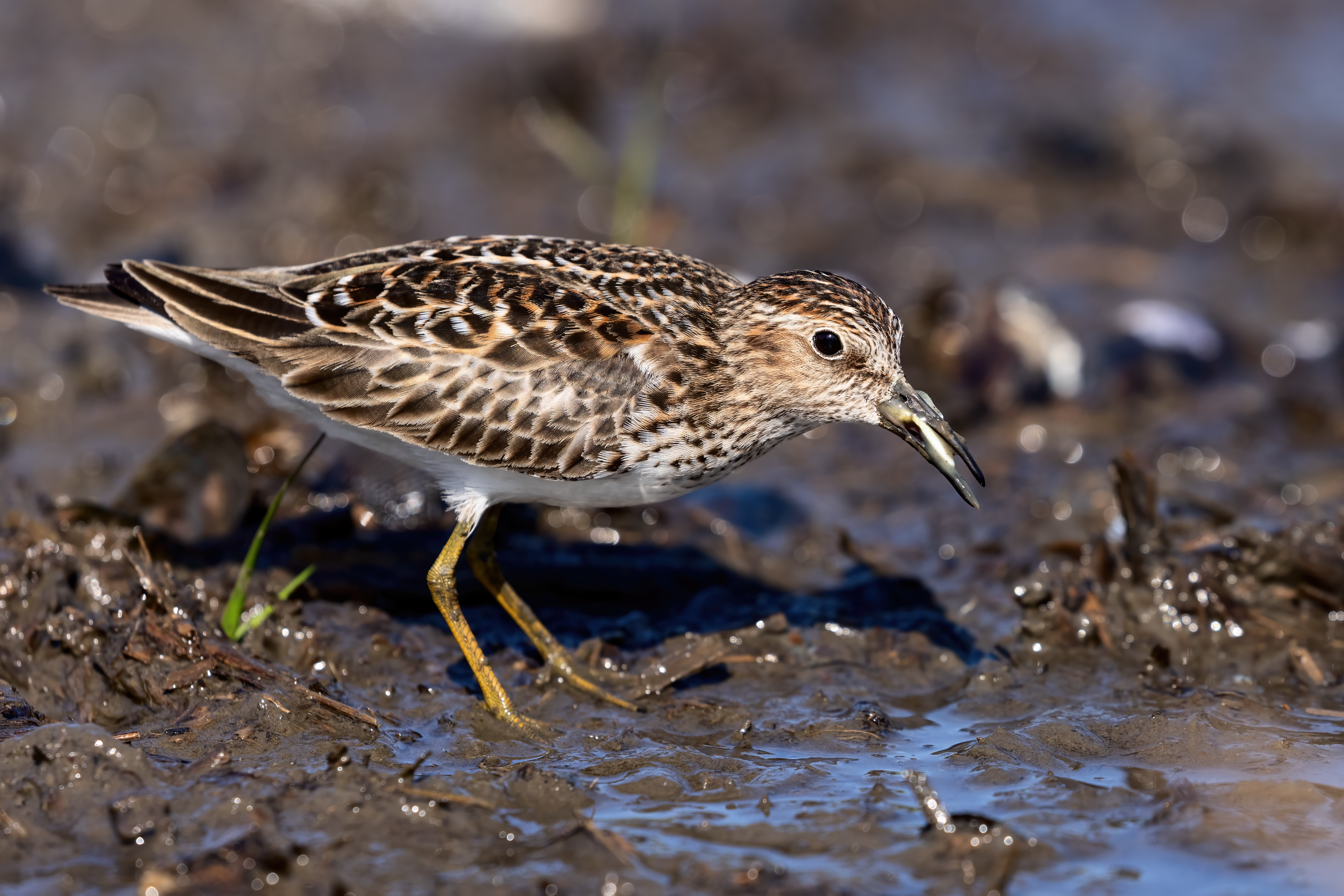
Playero menudo
(Calidris minutilla)

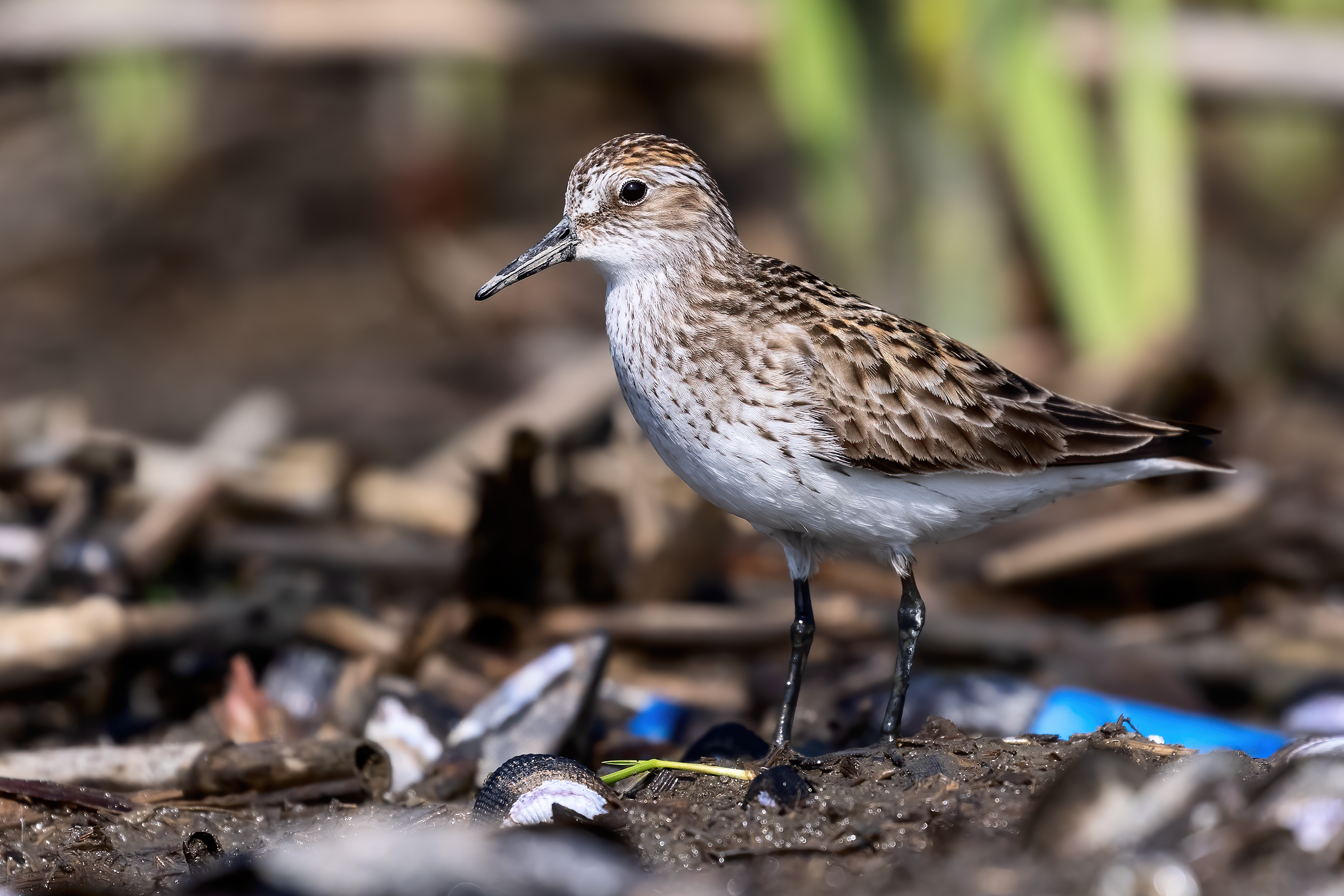
Playerito gracioso
(Calidris pusilla)

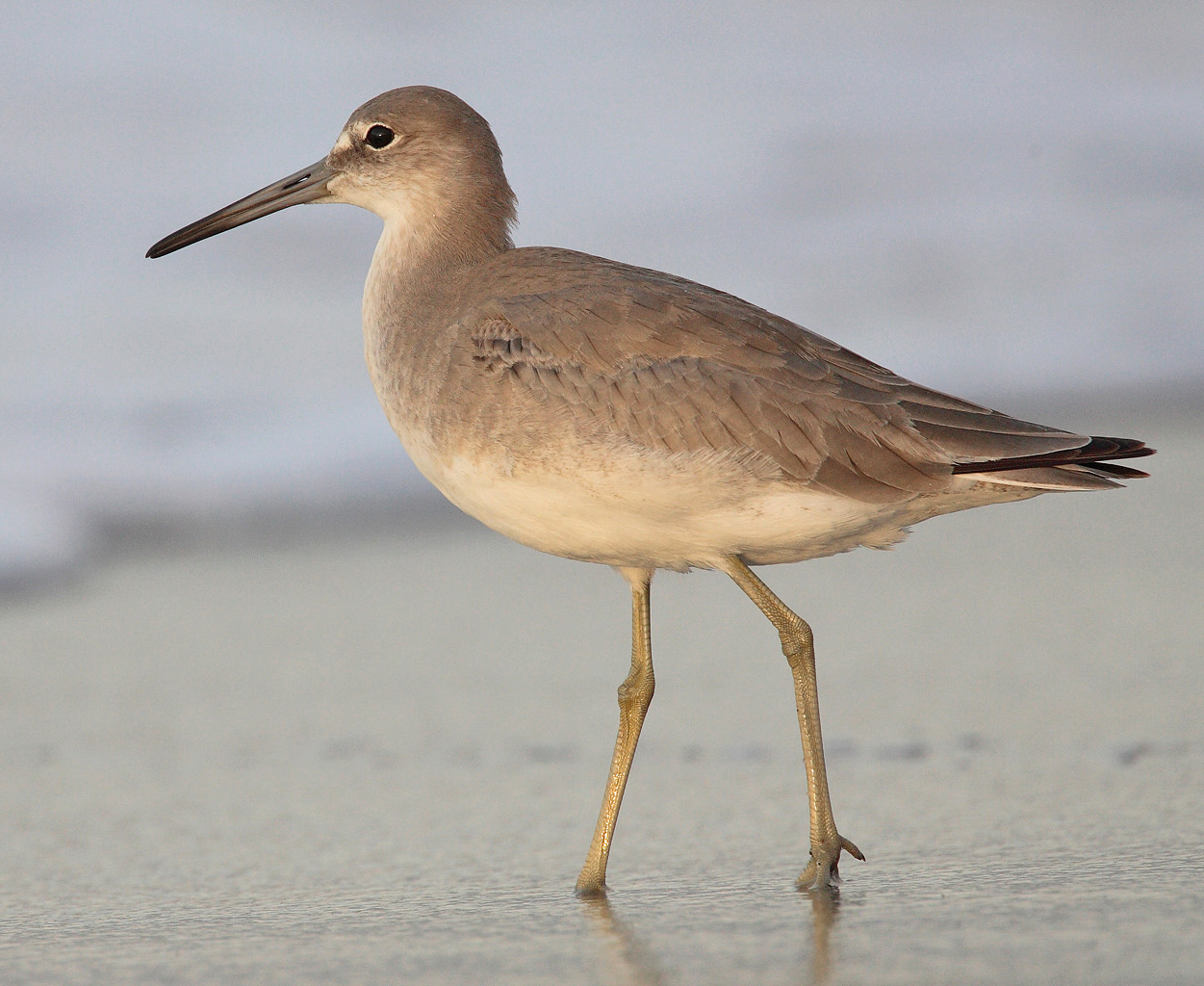
Playero aliblanco
(Catoptrophorus semipalmatus)

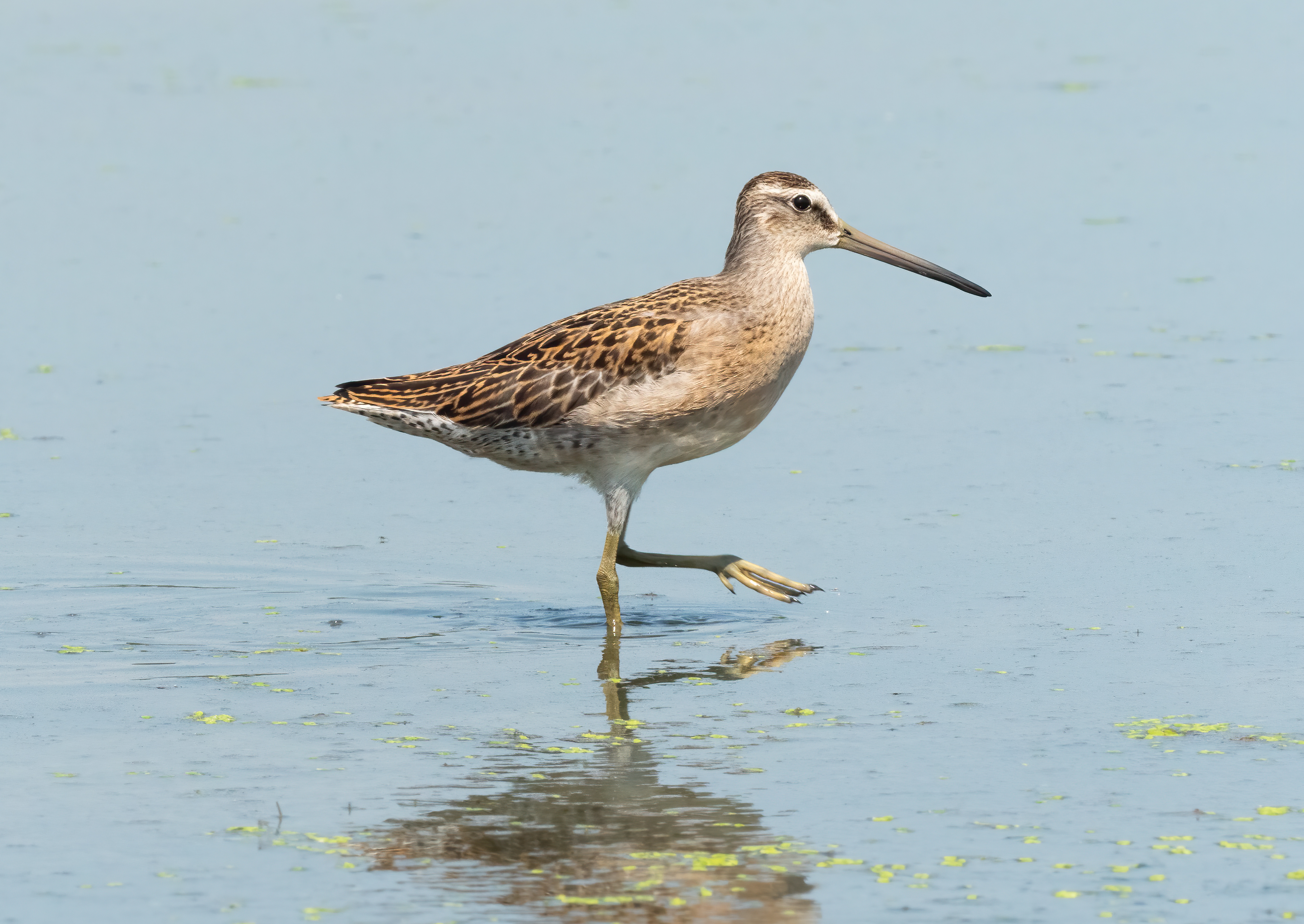
Chorlo pico corto
(Limnodromus griseus)

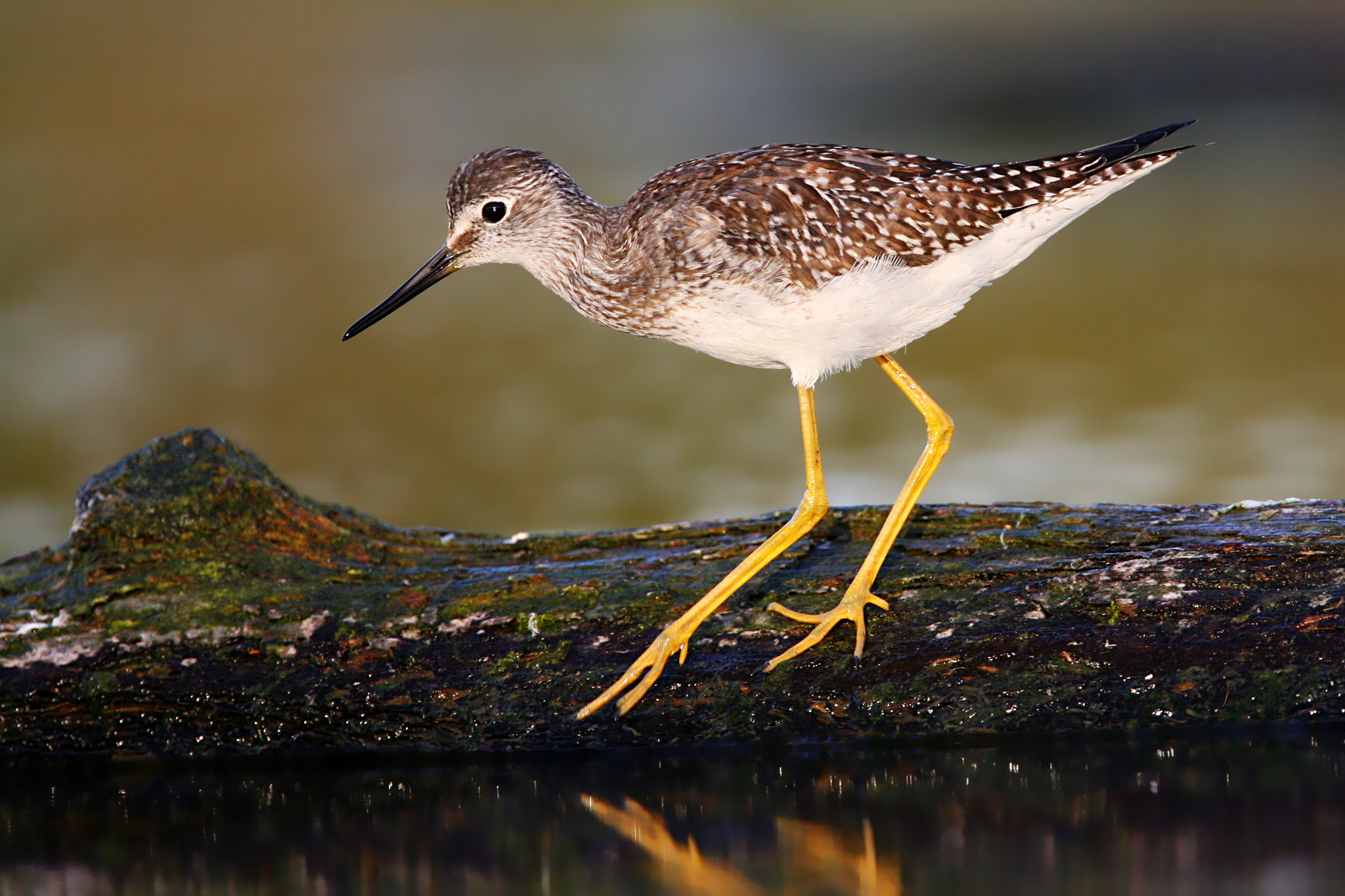
Playero guineilla menor
(Tringa flavipes)

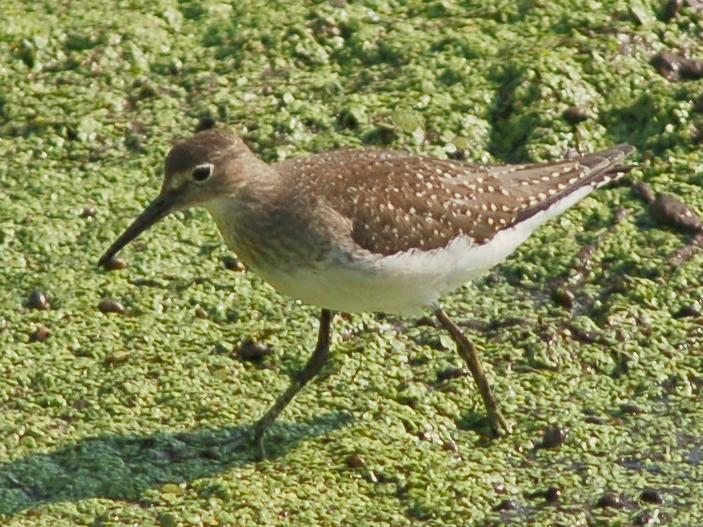
Playero solitario
(Tringa solitaria)

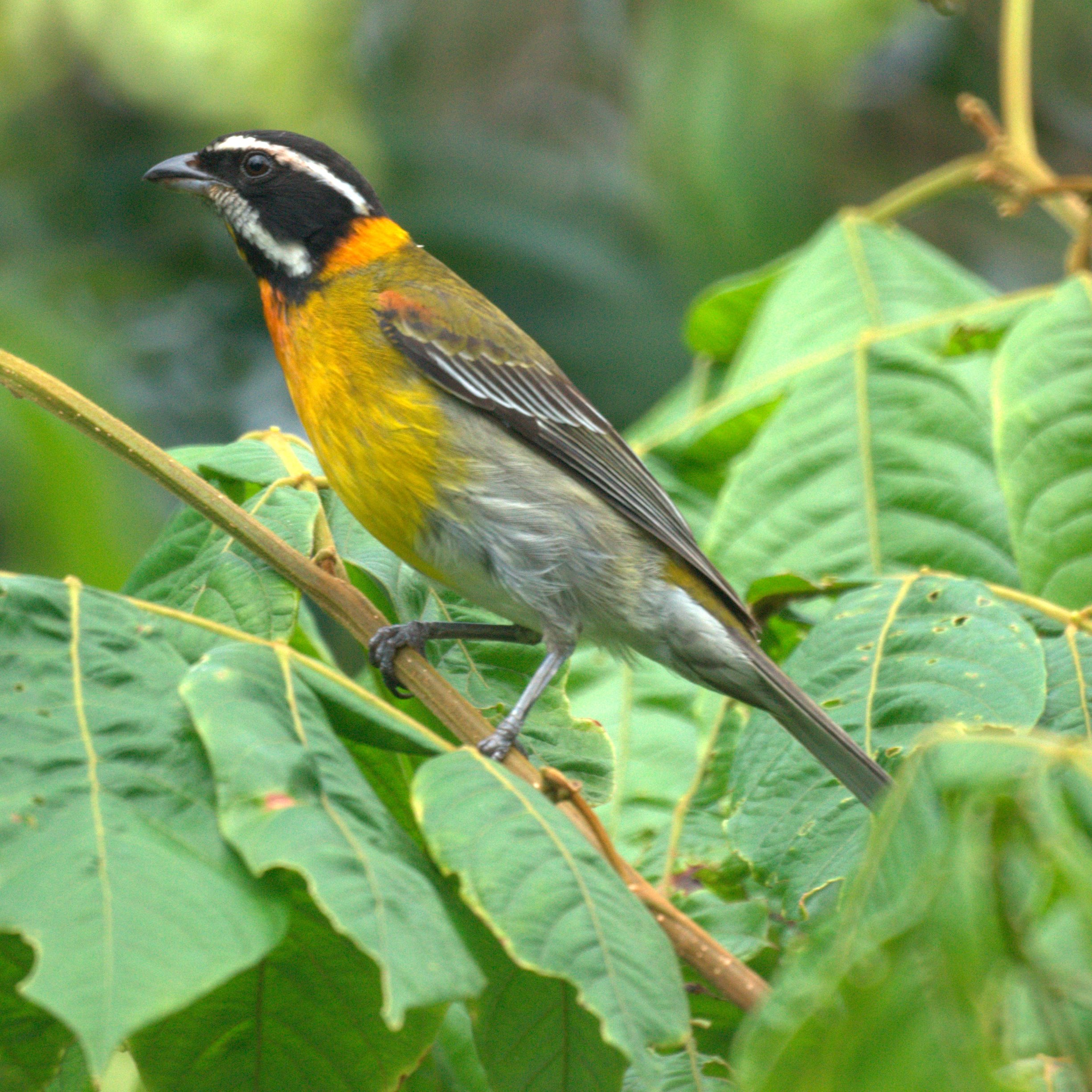
Reina mora
(Spindalis portoricensis)

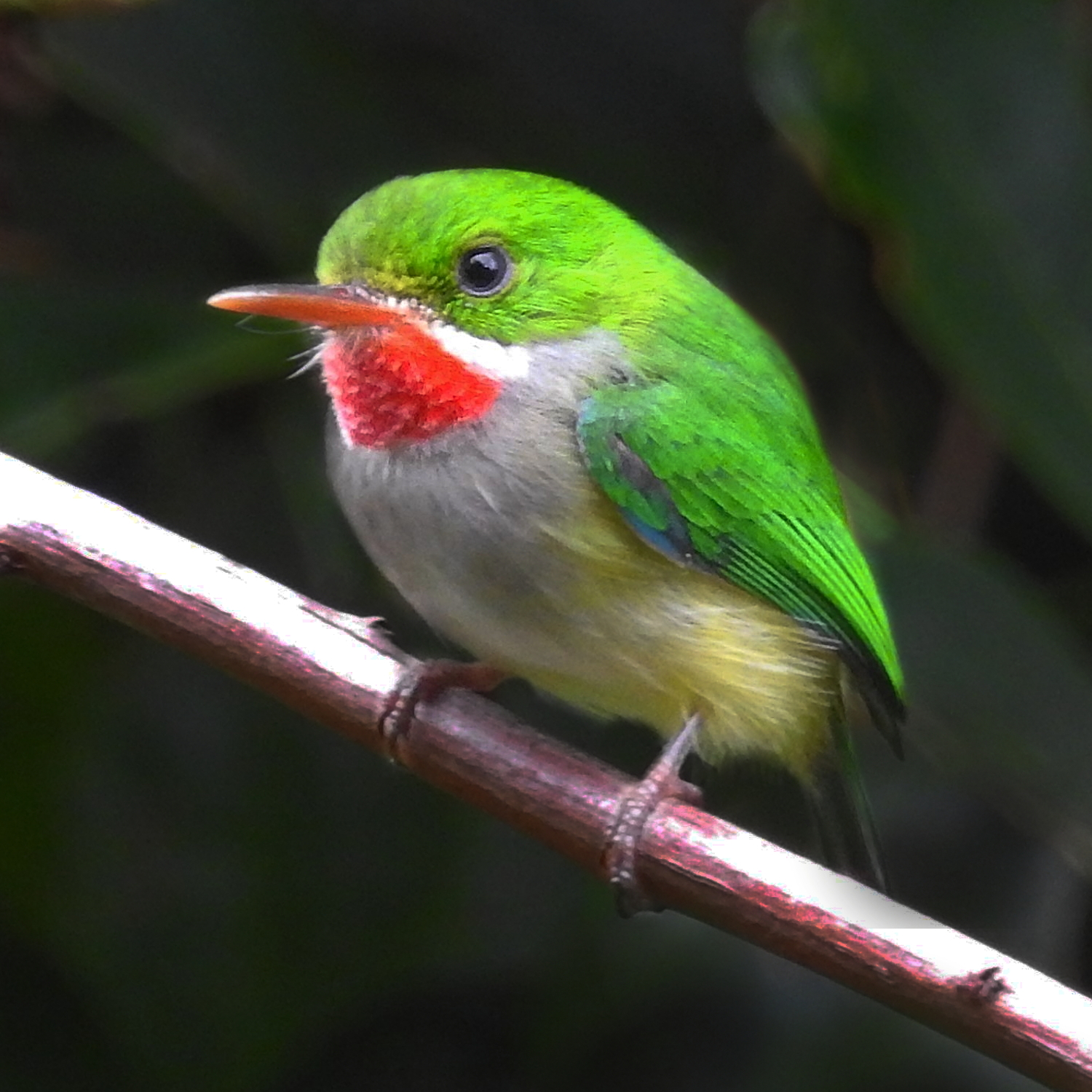
San Pedrito
(Todus mexicanus)

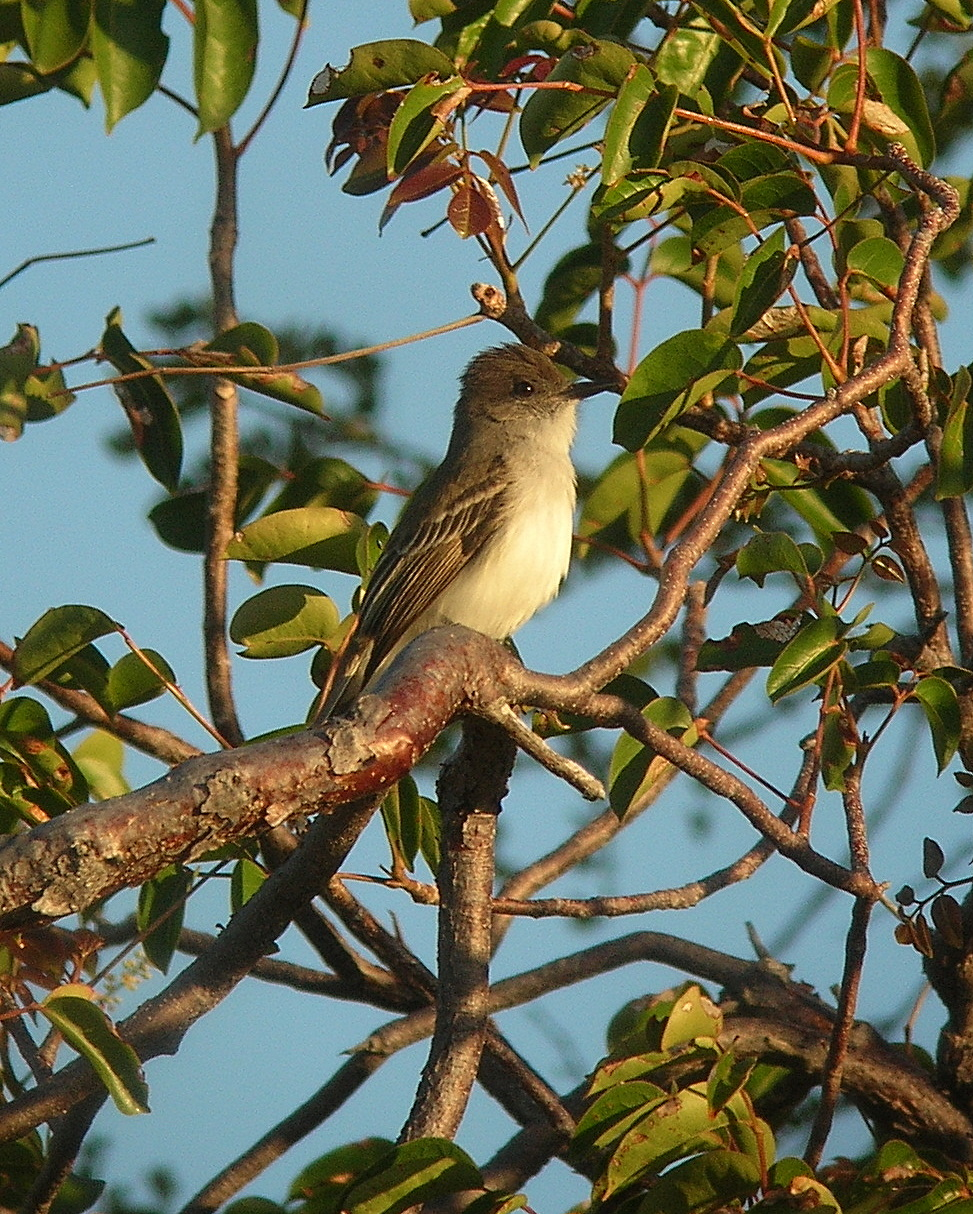
Juí de Puerto Rico
(Myiarchus antillarum)

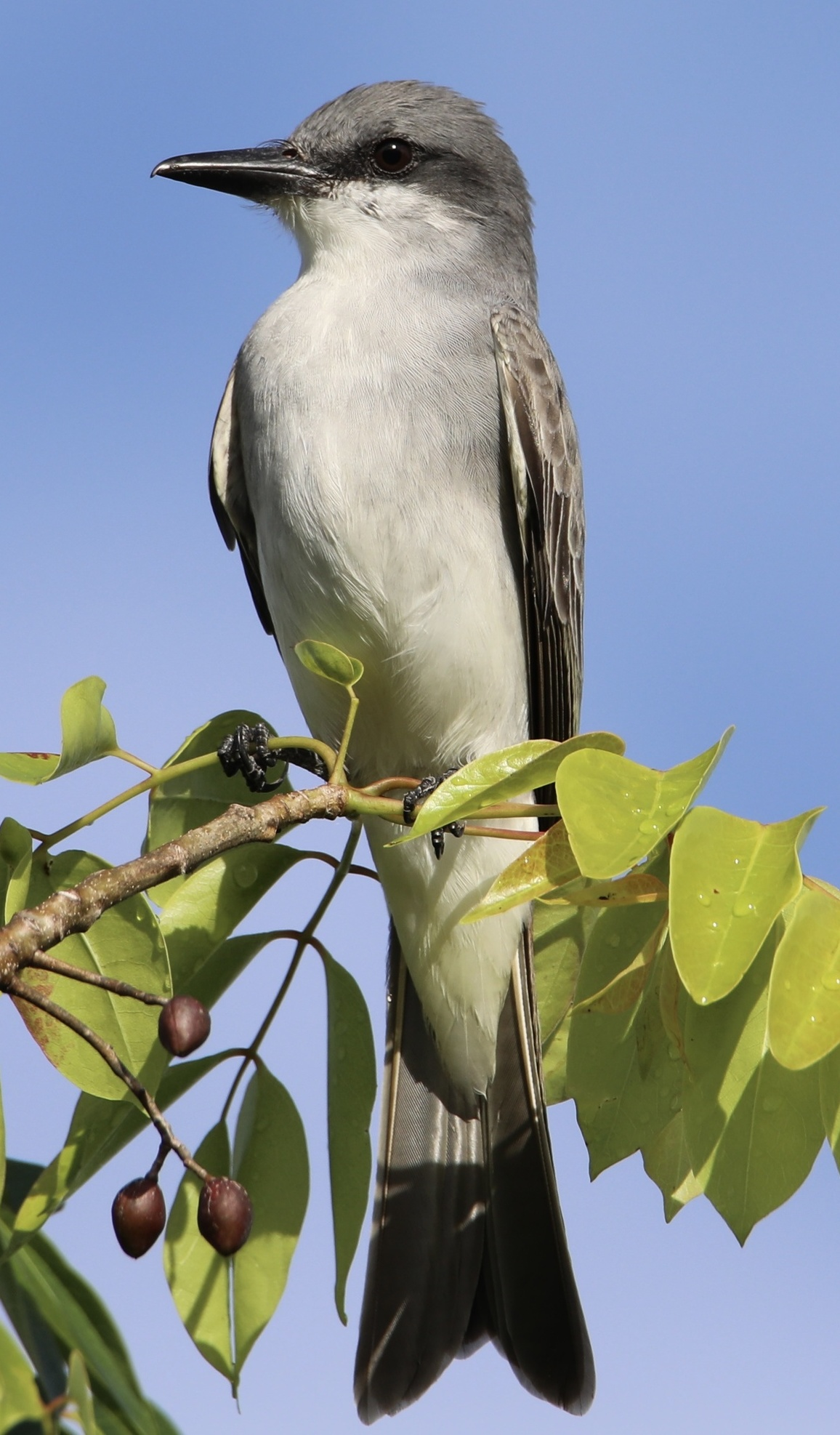
Pitirre
(Tyrannus dominicensis)

==== Non-birds ====
===== Mammals =====
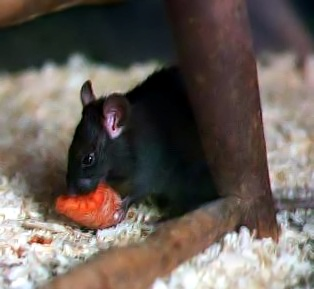
Rata negra
(Rattus rattus)

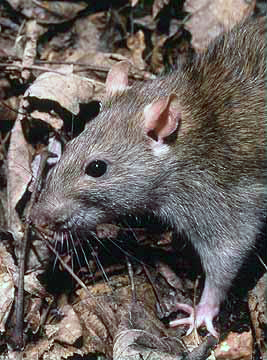
Rata común
(Rattus norvegicus)

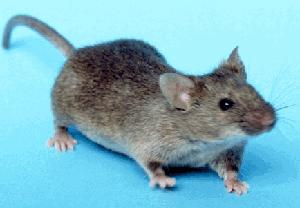
Ratón
(Mus musculus)

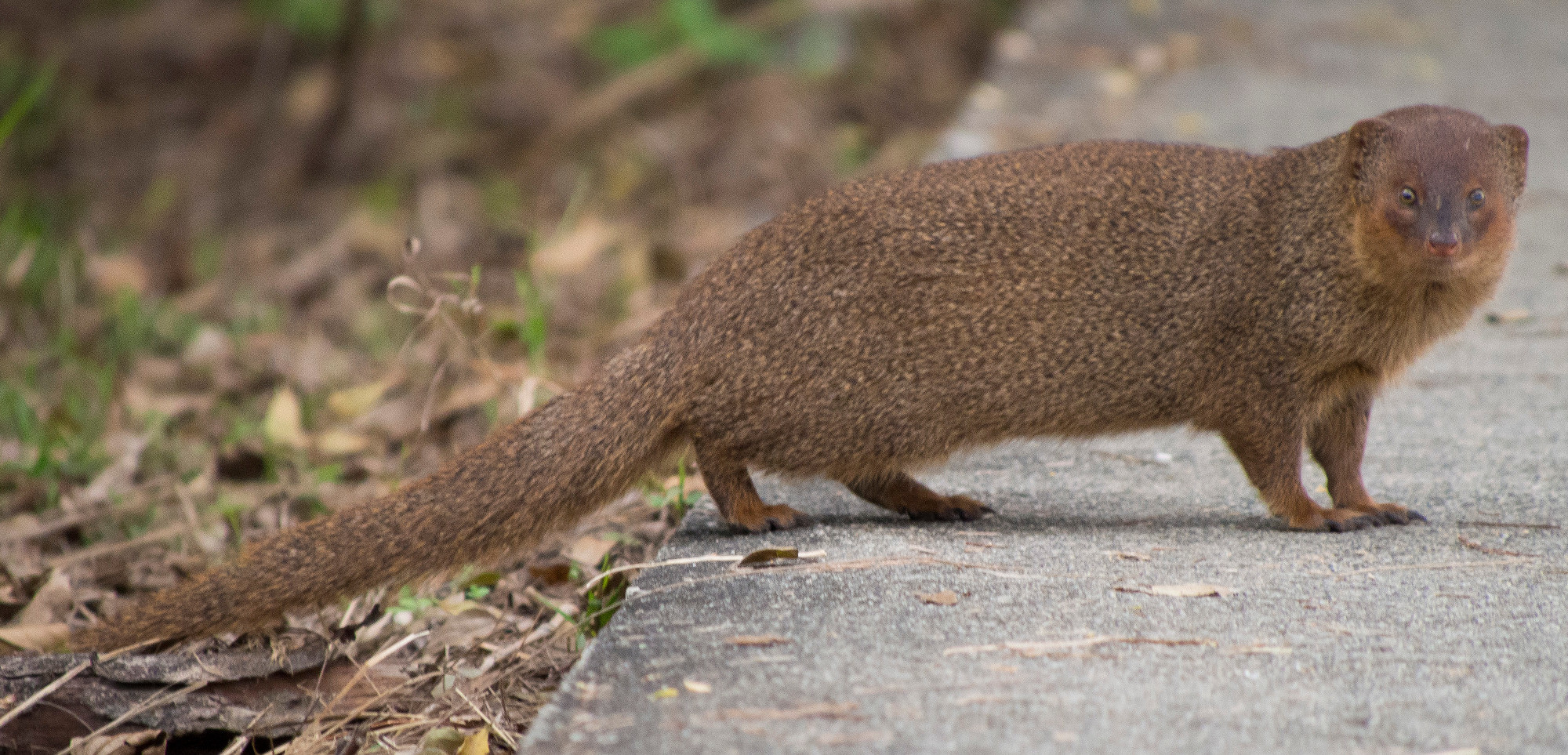
Mangosta
(Herpestes auropunctatus)

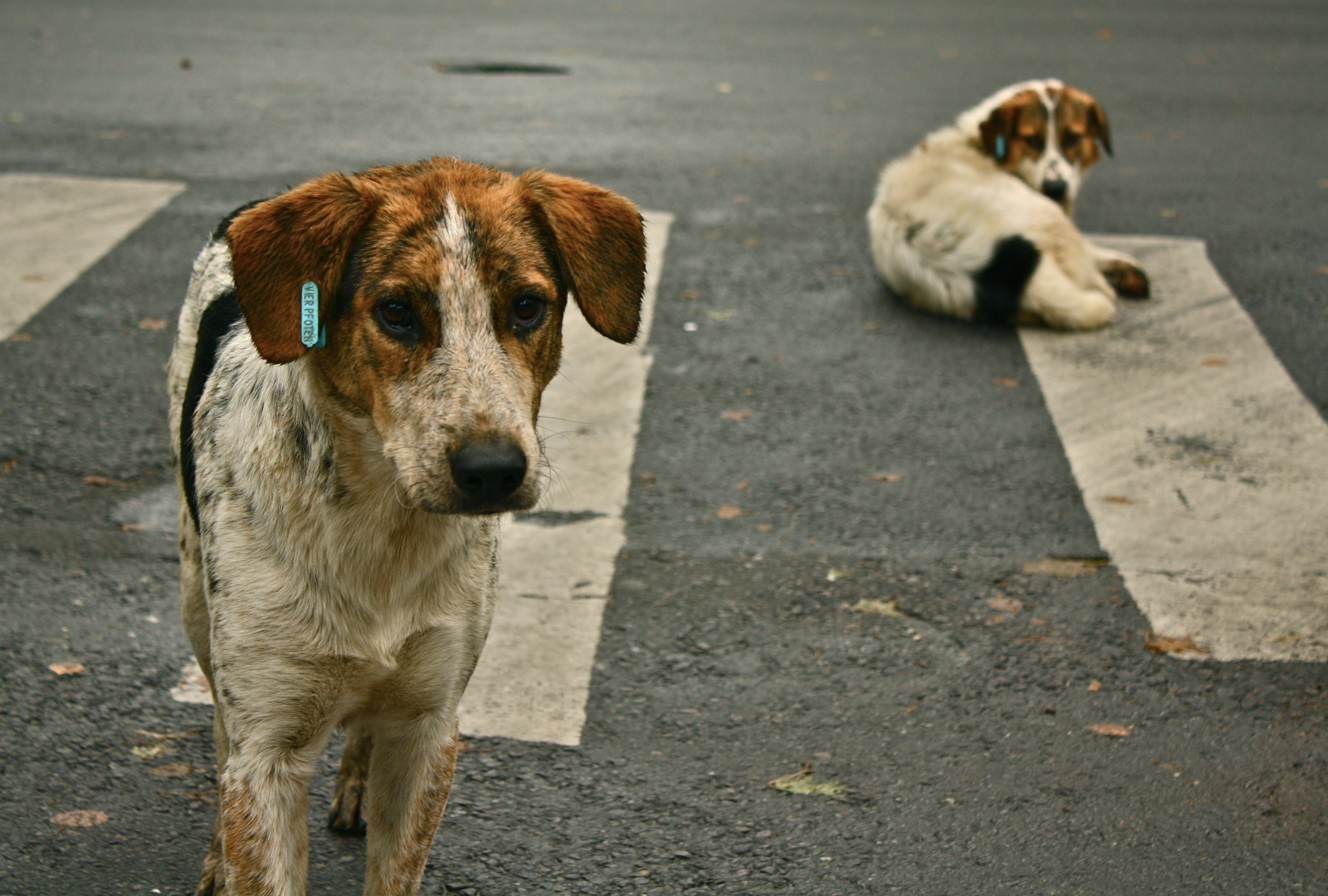
Perro sato
(Canis familiaris)

===== Reptiles =====
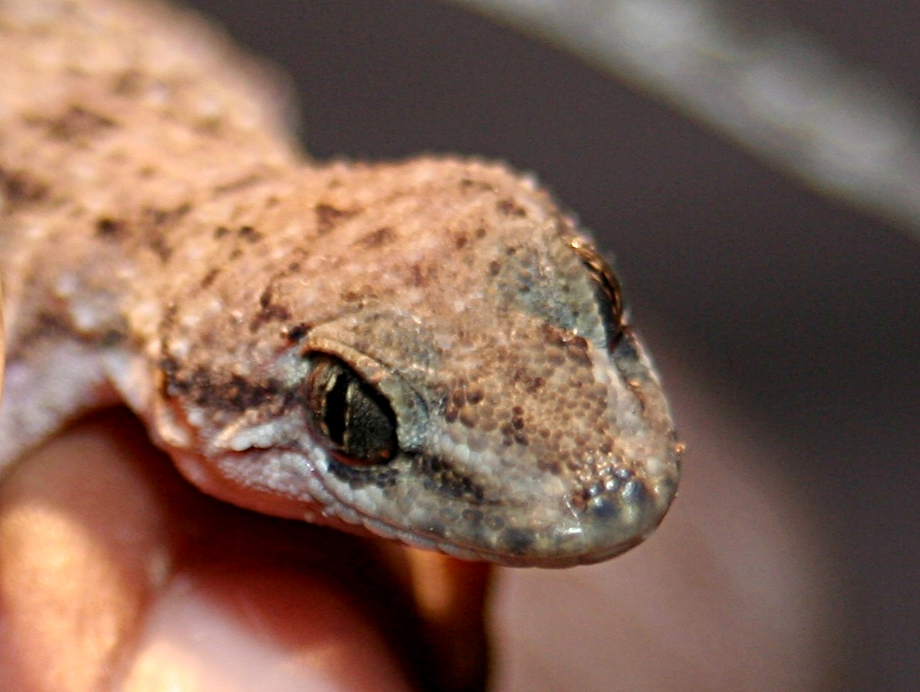
Salamanquesa
(Hemidactylus brooki haitianus)

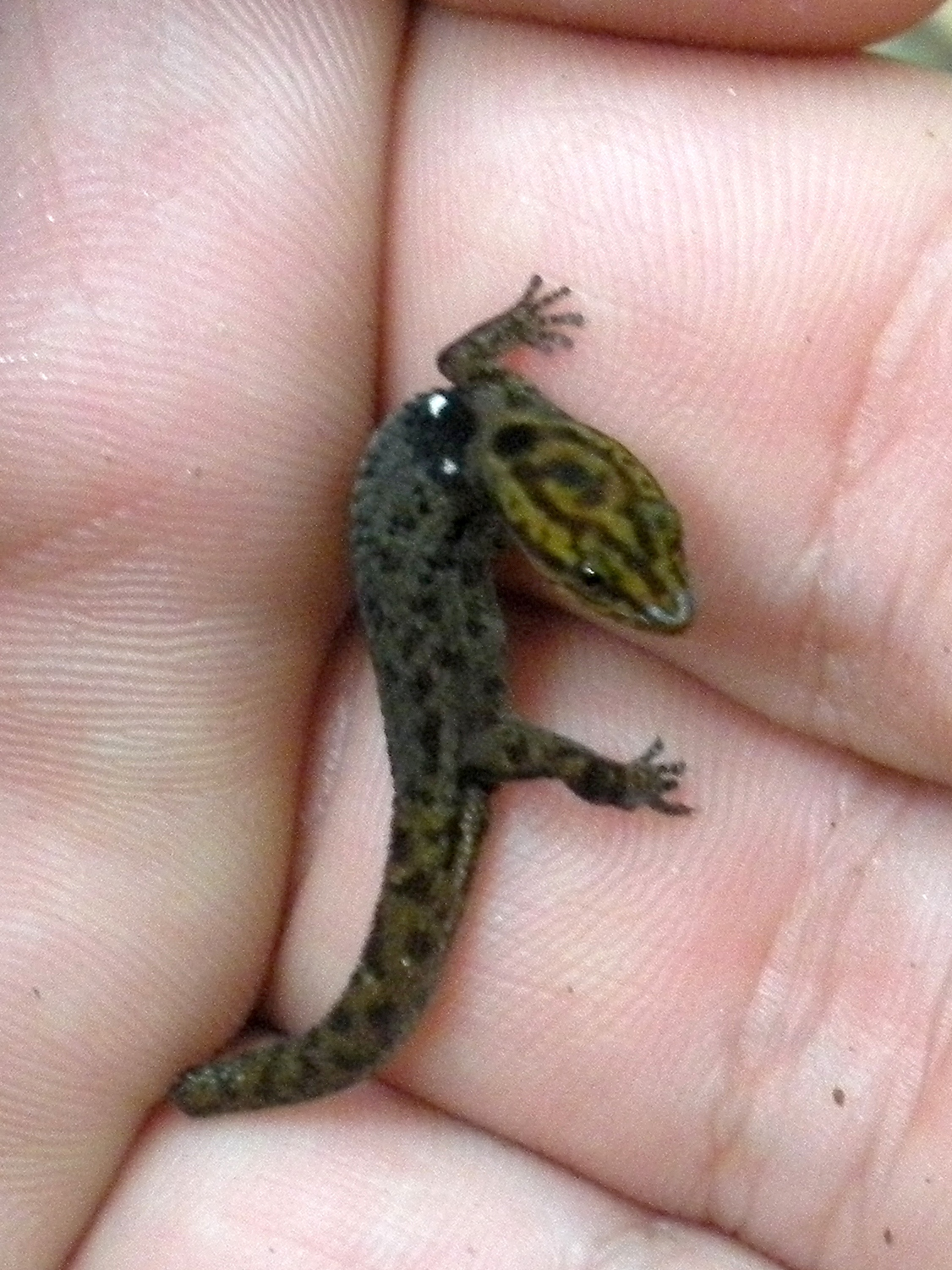
Salamanquita de la Virgen
(Sphaerodactylus macrolepis)

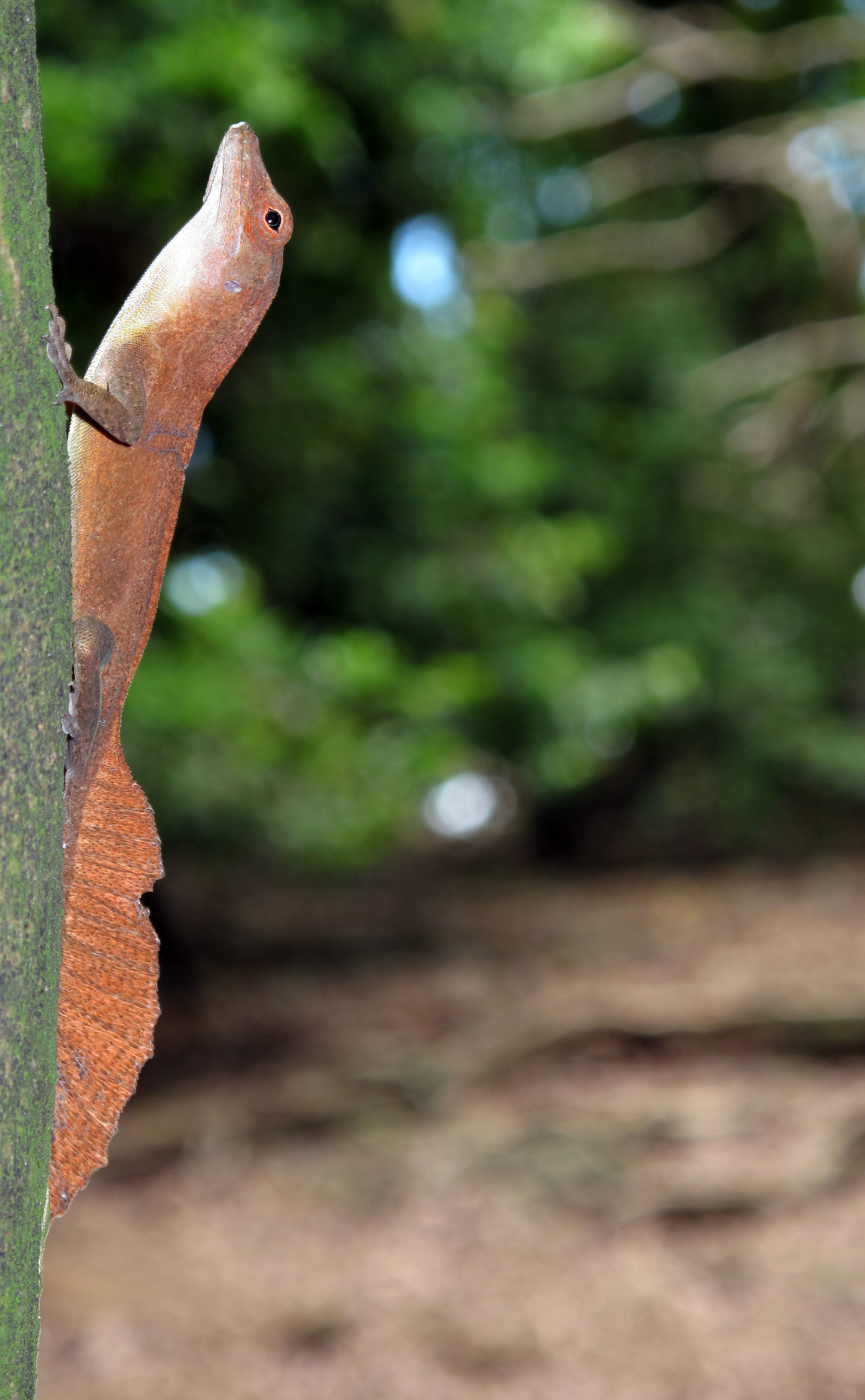
Lagartijo común
(Anolis cristatellus)

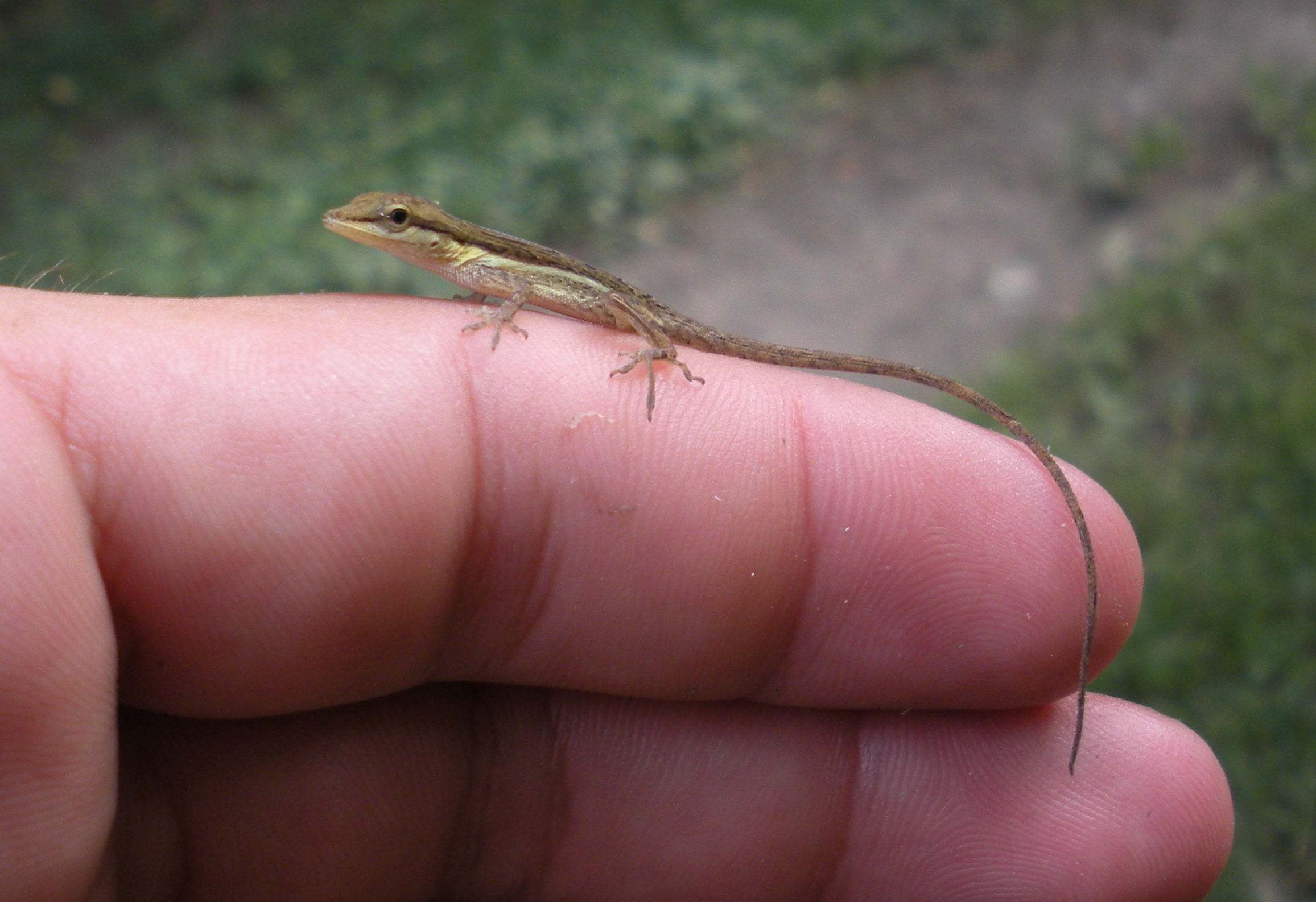
Lagartijo jardinero
(Anolis pulchellus)

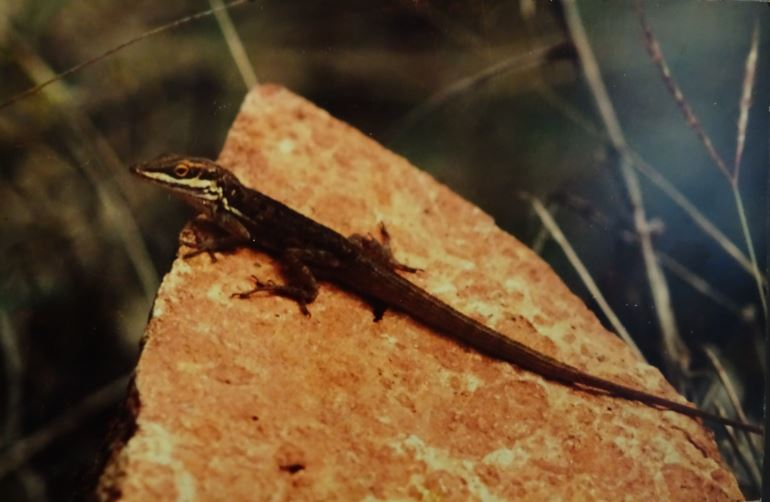
Lagartijo jardinero del sur
(Anolis poncensis)

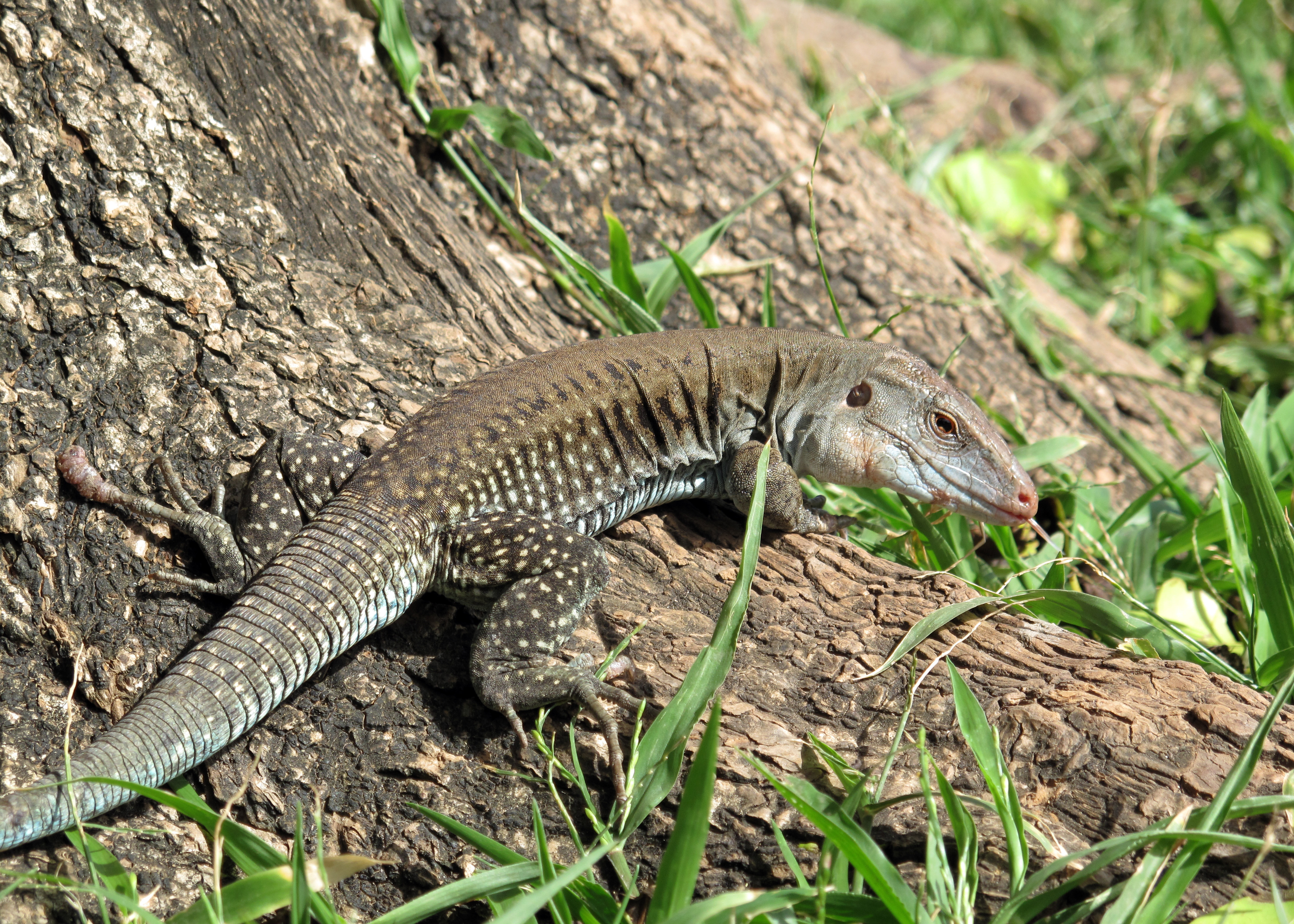
Siguana
(Ameiva exsul)

===== Amphibians =====
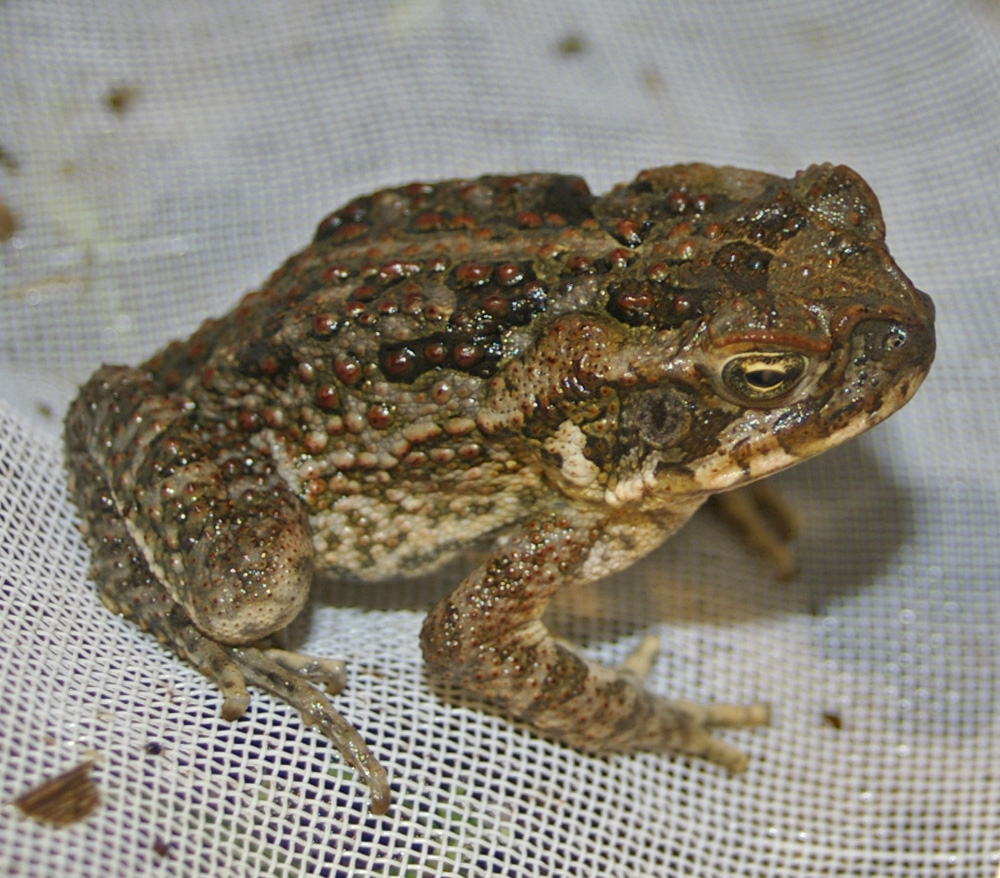
Sapo común
(Bufo marinus)

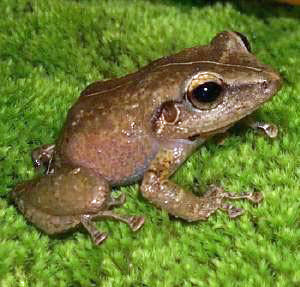
Coquí común
(Eleutherodactylus coqui)

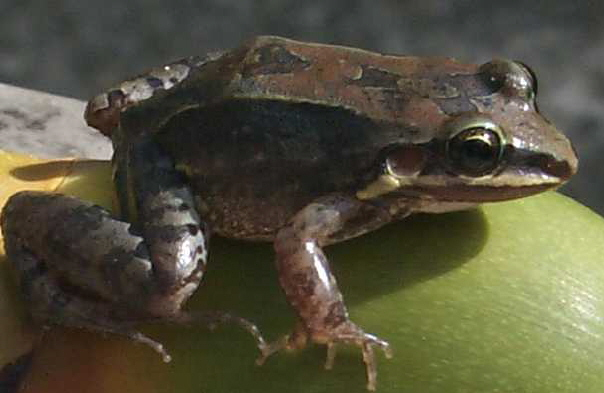
Ranita de labio blanco
(Leptodactylus albilabris)

== See also ==
- Porta Caribe
- Cerrillos State Forest
- Toro Negro State Forest
