= List of mountain peaks of the Caribbean =

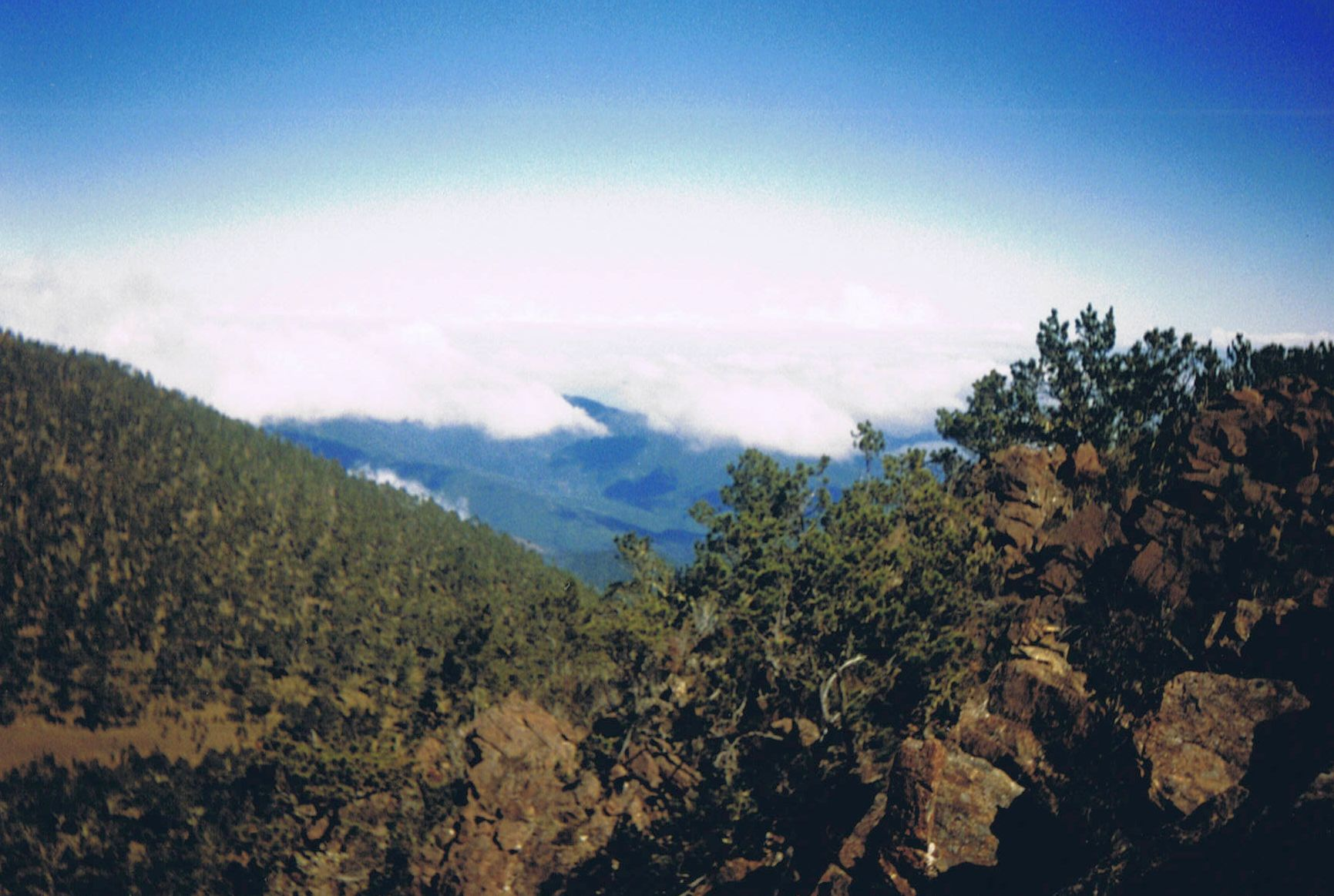
Pico Duarte is the highest point in the Dominican Republic, the island of Hispaniola, and the entire Caribbean.

This article comprises three sortable tables of major mountain peaks of the islands of the Caribbean Sea.

The summit of a mountain or hill may be measured in three principal ways:

1. The topographic elevation of a summit measures the height of the summit above a geodetic sea level. The first table below ranks the 20 highest major summits of the Caribbean by elevation.
2. The topographic prominence of a summit is a measure of how high the summit rises above its surroundings. The second table below ranks the 20 most prominent summits of the Caribbean.
3. The topographic isolation (or radius of dominance) of a summit measures how far the summit lies from its nearest point of equal elevation. The third table below ranks the 20 most isolated major summits of the Caribbean.

== Highest major summits ==
Of the 20 highest major summits of the Caribbean, only Pico Duarte exceeds 3000 meters (9843 feet) elevation, six peaks exceed 2000 meters (6562 feet), and 15 peaks exceed 1000 meters (3281 feet) elevation.

Of these 20 peaks, three are located in the Dominican Republic, three in Cuba, two in Haiti, two in Saint Kitts and Nevis, one each in Jamaica, Guadeloupe, Dominica, Martinique, Puerto Rico, Saint Vincent and the Grenadines, Saint Lucia, Trinidad and Tobago, Montserrat, and Venezuela.

The 20 highest summits of the Caribbean with at least 500 meters of topographic prominence
Rank	Mountain peak	Country	Island	Elevation	Prominence	Isolation	Location
1	Pico Duarte (Note: The summit of Pico Duarte is the highest point of the Dominican Republic, the Island of Hispaniola, and all islands of the Caribbean Sea.)	Dominican Republic	Island of Hispaniola	3098 m 10,164 ft	3098 m 10,164 ft	941 km 584 mi	19.0231°N 70.9977°W
2	Loma Alto de la Bandera (Note: Loma Alto de la Bandera is the southernmost and easternmost summit of its elevation in the Caribbean.)	Dominican Republic	Island of Hispaniola	2842 m 9,324 ft	1512 m 4,961 ft	43.4 km 27 mi	18.8126°N 70.6268°W
3	Pic la Selle (Note: The summit of Pic la Selle is the highest point of the Republic of Haiti.) (Note: Pic la Selle is the southernmost and westernmost summit of its elevation in the Caribbean.)	Haiti	Island of Hispaniola	2674 m 8,773 ft	2644 m 8,675 ft	126.6 km 78.7 mi	18.3602°N 71.9767°W
4	Pic Macaya (Note: Pic Macaya is the westernmost summit of its elevation in the Caribbean.)	Haiti	Island of Hispaniola	2347 m 7,700 ft	2087 m 6,847 ft	216 km 134.5 mi	18.3822°N 74.0243°W
5	Loma Gajo en Medio	Dominican Republic	Island of Hispaniola	2279 m 7,477 ft	1779 m 5,837 ft	57.5 km 35.7 mi	18.6292°N 71.5108°W
6	Blue Mountain Peak (Note: The summit of Blue Mountain Peak is the highest point of the island and the nation of Jamaica.) (Note: Blue Mountain Peak is the southernmost and westernmost 2000-meter (6562-foot) summit and ultra-prominent summit of the Caribbean.)	Jamaica	Island of Jamaica	2256 m 7,402 ft	2256 m 7,402 ft	273 km 169.5 mi	18.0465°N 76.5788°W
7	Pico Turquino (Note: The summit of Pico Turquino is the highest point of the island and Republic of Cuba.) (Note: Pico Turquino is the northernmost and westernmost ultra-prominent summit of the Caribbean.)	Cuba	Island of Cuba	1974 m 6,476 ft	1974 m 6,476 ft	217 km 134.7 mi	19.9898°N 76.8360°W
8	La Grande Soufrière (Note: The summit of La Grande Soufrière is the highest point of île de Basse-Terre and the French Région Guadeloupe.) (Note: La Grande Soufrière is the southernmost and easternmost summit of its elevation in the Caribbean.)	Guadeloupe	île de Basse-Terre	1467 m 4,813 ft	1467 m 4,813 ft	699 km 434 mi	16.0449°N 61.6638°W
9	Morne Diablotins (Note: The summit of Morne Diablotins is the highest point of the island and Commonwealth of Dominica.) (Note: Morne Diablotins is the southernmost summit of its elevation in the Caribbean.)	Dominica	Island of Dominica	1447 m 4,747 ft	1447 m 4,747 ft	66.3 km 41.2 mi	15.5040°N 61.3981°W
10	Montagne Pelée (Note: The summit of Montagne Pelée is the highest point of the island and French insular region of Martinique.) (Note: Montagne Pelée is the southernmost and easternmost summit of its elevation in the Caribbean.)	Martinique	Island of Martinique	1395 m 4,577 ft	1395 m 4,577 ft	80.8 km 50.2 mi	14.8092°N 61.1654°W
11	Cerro de Punta (Note: The summit of Cerro de Punta is the highest point of the island and Commonwealth of Puerto Rico.)	Puerto Rico	Island of Puerto Rico	1337.8 m 4,389 ft	1338 m 4,389 ft	432 km 268 mi	18.1722°N 66.5917°W
12	Gran Piedra (Note: Gran Piedra is the northernmost summit of its elevation in the Caribbean.)	Cuba	Island of Cuba	1249 m 4,098 ft	500 m 1,640 ft	100.7 km 62.5 mi	20.0115°N 75.6270°W
13	La Soufrière (Note: The summit of La Soufrière is the highest point of the island of Saint Vincent and the nation of Saint Vincent and the Grenadines.) (Note: La Soufrière is the southernmost 1000-meter (3281-foot) summit of the Caribbean.)	Saint Vincent and the Grenadines	Island of Saint Vincent	1234 m 4,049 ft	1234 m 4,049 ft	161.7 km 100.5 mi	13.3477°N 61.1761°W
14	Mount Liamuiga (Note: The summit of Mount Liamuiga is the highest point of the island of Saint Kitts and the Federation of Saint Kitts and Nevis.) (Mount Misery)	Saint Kitts and Nevis	Saint Christopher Island (Island of Saint Kitts)	1156 m 3,793 ft	1156 m 3,793 ft	190.3 km 118.2 mi	17.3685°N 62.8029°W
15	Pico San Juan (Note: Pico San Juan is the northernmost and westernmost 1000-meter (3281-foot) summit of the Caribbean.)	Cuba	Island of Cuba	1140 m 3,740 ft	500 m 1,640 ft	408 km 253 mi	21.9853°N 80.1327°W
16	Nevis Peak (Note: The summit of Nevis Peak is the highest point of Island of Nevis.)	Saint Kitts and Nevis	Island of Nevis	985 m 3,232 ft	985 m 3,232 ft	20.9 km 12.97 mi	17.1501°N 62.5834°W
17	Mount Gimie (Note: The summit of Mount Gimie is the highest point of the island and nation of Saint Lucia.) (Note: Mount Gimie is the easternmost summit of its elevation in the Caribbean.)	Saint Lucia	Island of Saint Lucia	950 m 3,117 ft	950 m 3,117 ft	59.8 km 37.2 mi	13.8637°N 61.0117°W
18	Aripo Peak (Note: The summit of Aripo Peak is the highest point of the island of Trinidad and the Republic of Trinidad and Tobago.) (Note: Aripo Peak is the southernmost 500-meter (1640-foot) summit of the Caribbean.)	Trinidad and Tobago	Island of Trinidad	940 m 3,084 ft	940 m 3,084 ft	151.6 km 94.2 mi	10.7231°N 61.2499°W
19	Soufrière Hills Volcano (Note: The summit of Soufrière Hills Volcano is the highest point of the island and British Overseas Territory of Montserrat.)	Montserrat, United Kingdom	Island of Montserrat	914 m 2,999 ft	914 m 2,999 ft	65.1 km 40.4 mi	16.7123°N 62.1756°W
20	Cerro El Copey (Note: The summit of Cerro El Copey is the highest point of Isla de Margarita.)	Venezuela	Isla de Margarita	900 m 2,953 ft	900 m 2,953 ft	56.3 km 35 mi	10.9975°N 63.9126°W

== Most prominent summits ==
Of the 20 most prominent summits of the Caribbean, only Pico Duarte exceeds 3000 meters (9843 feet) of topographic prominence. Four peaks exceed 2000 meters (6562 feet), seven peaks are ultra-prominent summits with at least 1500 meters (4921 feet), and 13 peaks exceed 1000 meters (3281 feet) of topographic prominence.

Of these 20 peaks, three are located in the Dominican Republic, two in Haiti, two in Saint Kitts and Nevis, and one each in Jamaica, Cuba, Guadeloupe, Dominica, Martinique, Puerto Rico, Saint Lucia, Trinidad and Tobago, Montserrat, Venezuela, Saba, and Grenada.

The 20 most topographically prominent summits of the Caribbean
Rank	Mountain peak	Country	Island	Elevation	Prominence	Isolation	Location
1	Pico Duarte	Dominican Republic	Island of Hispaniola	3098 m 10,164 ft	3098 m 10,164 ft	941 km 584 mi	19.0231°N 70.9977°W
2	Pic la Selle	Haiti	Island of Hispaniola	2674 m 8,773 ft	2644 m 8,675 ft	126.6 km 78.7 mi	18.3602°N 71.9767°W
3	Blue Mountain Peak	Jamaica	Island of Jamaica	2256 m 7,402 ft	2256 m 7,402 ft	273 km 169.5 mi	18.0465°N 76.5788°W
4	Pic Macaya	Haiti	Island of Hispaniola	2347 m 7,700 ft	2087 m 6,847 ft	216 km 134.5 mi	18.3822°N 74.0243°W
5	Pico Turquino	Cuba	Island of Cuba	1974 m 6,476 ft	1974 m 6,476 ft	217 km 134.7 mi	19.9898°N 76.8360°W
6	Loma Gajo en Medio	Dominican Republic	Island of Hispaniola	2279 m 7,477 ft	1779 m 5,837 ft	57.5 km 35.7 mi	18.6292°N 71.5108°W
7	Loma Alto de la Bandera	Dominican Republic	Island of Hispaniola	2842 m 9,324 ft	1512 m 4,961 ft	43.4 km 27 mi	18.8126°N 70.6268°W
8	La Grande Soufrière	Guadeloupe	île de Basse-Terre	1467 m 4,813 ft	1467 m 4,813 ft	699 km 434 mi	16.0449°N 61.6638°W
9	Morne Diablotins	Dominica	Island of Dominica	1447 m 4,747 ft	1447 m 4,747 ft	66.3 km 41.2 mi	15.5040°N 61.3981°W
10	Montagne Pelée	Martinique	Island of Martinique	1395 m 4,577 ft	1395 m 4,577 ft	80.8 km 50.2 mi	14.8092°N 61.1654°W
11	Cerro de Punta	Puerto Rico	Island of Puerto Rico	1337.8 m 4,389 ft	1338 m 4,389 ft	432 km 268 mi	18.1722°N 66.5917°W
12	La Soufrière	Saint Vincent and the Grenadines	Island of Saint Vincent	1234 m 4,049 ft	1234 m 4,049 ft	161.7 km 100.5 mi	13.3477°N 61.1761°W
13	Mount Liamuiga (Mount Misery)	Saint Kitts and Nevis	Saint Christopher Island (Island of Saint Kitts)	1156 m 3,793 ft	1156 m 3,793 ft	190.3 km 118.2 mi	17.3685°N 62.8029°W
14	Nevis Peak	Saint Kitts and Nevis	Island of Nevis	985 m 3,232 ft	985 m 3,232 ft	20.9 km 12.97 mi	17.1501°N 62.5834°W
15	Mount Gimie	Saint Lucia	Island of Saint Lucia	950 m 3,117 ft	950 m 3,117 ft	59.8 km 37.2 mi	13.8637°N 61.0117°W
16	Aripo Peak	Trinidad and Tobago	Island of Trinidad	940 m 3,084 ft	940 m 3,084 ft	151.6 km 94.2 mi	10.7231°N 61.2499°W
17	Soufrière Hills Volcano	Montserrat	Island of Montserrat	914 m 2,999 ft	914 m 2,999 ft	65.1 km 40.4 mi	16.7123°N 62.1756°W
18	Cerro El Copey	Venezuela	Isla de Margarita	900 m 2,953 ft	900 m 2,953 ft	56.3 km 35 mi	10.9975°N 63.9126°W
19	Mount Scenery (Note: The summit of Mount Scenery is the highest point of the island and Netherlands special municipality of Saba.)	Saba	Island of Saba	870 m 2,854 ft	870 m 2,854 ft	54.8 km 34 mi	17.6348°N 63.2377°W
20	Mount Saint Catherine (Note: The summit of Mount Saint Catherine is the highest point of the island and nation of Grenada.) (Note: Mount Saint Catherine is the southernmost summit of its elevation in the Caribbean.)	Grenada	Island of Grenada	840 m 2,756 ft	840 m 2,756 ft	135.2 km 84 mi	12.1623°N 61.6750°W

== Most isolated major summits ==
Of the 20 most isolated major summits of the Caribbean, Pico Duarte and La Grande Soufrière exceed 500 kilometers (310.7 miles) of topographic isolation, seven peaks exceed 200 kilometers (124.3 miles), and 14 peaks exceed 100 kilometers (62.14 miles) of topographic isolation.

Of these 20 peaks, three are located in Cuba, two in the Dominican Republic, two in Haiti, two in Trinidad and Tobago, and one each in Guadeloupe, Puerto Rico, Jamaica, Saint Kitts and Nevis, Saint Vincent and the Grenadines, Granada, the British Virgin Islands, Martinique, Dominica, Montserrat, and Saint Lucia.

The 20 most topographically isolated summits of the Caribbean with at least 500 meters of topographic prominence
Rank	Mountain peak	Country	Island	Elevation	Prominence	Isolation	Location
1	Pico Duarte	Dominican Republic	Island of Hispaniola	3098 m 10,164 ft	3098 m 10,164 ft	941 km 584 mi	19.0231°N 70.9977°W
2	La Grande Soufrière	Guadeloupe	île de Basse-Terre	1467 m 4,813 ft	1467 m 4,813 ft	699 km 434 mi	16.0449°N 61.6638°W
3	Cerro de Punta	Puerto Rico	Island of Puerto Rico	1337.8 m 4,389 ft	1338 m 4,389 ft	432 km 268 mi	18.1722°N 66.5917°W
4	Pico San Juan	Cuba	Island of Cuba	1140 m 3,740 ft	500 m 1,640 ft	408 km 253 mi	21.9853°N 80.1327°W
5	Blue Mountain Peak	Jamaica	Island of Jamaica	2256 m 7,402 ft	2256 m 7,402 ft	273 km 169.5 mi	18.0465°N 76.5788°W
6	Pico Turquino	Cuba	Island of Cuba	1974 m 6,476 ft	1974 m 6,476 ft	217 km 134.7 mi	19.9898°N 76.8360°W
7	Pic Macaya	Haiti	Island of Hispaniola	2347 m 7,700 ft	2087 m 6,847 ft	216 km 134.5 mi	18.3822°N 74.0243°W
8	Mount Liamuiga (Mount Misery)	Saint Kitts and Nevis	Saint Christopher Island (Island of Saint Kitts)	1156 m 3,793 ft	1156 m 3,793 ft	190.3 km 118.2 mi	17.3685°N 62.8029°W
9	La Soufrière	Saint Vincent and the Grenadines	Island of Saint Vincent	1234 m 4,049 ft	1234 m 4,049 ft	161.7 km 100.5 mi	13.3477°N 61.1761°W
10	Aripo Peak	Trinidad and Tobago	Island of Trinidad	940 m 3,084 ft	940 m 3,084 ft	151.6 km 94.2 mi	10.7231°N 61.2499°W
11	Mount Saint Catherine	Grenada	Island of Grenada	840 m 2,756 ft	840 m 2,756 ft	135.2 km 84 mi	12.1623°N 61.6750°W
12	Pic la Selle	Haiti	Island of Hispaniola	2674 m 8,773 ft	2644 m 8,675 ft	126.6 km 78.7 mi	18.3602°N 71.9767°W
13	Mount Sage (Note: The summit of Mount Sage is the highest point of the Island of Tortola and the British Virgin Islands.)	British Virgin Islands	Island of Tortola	521 m 1,709 ft	521 m 1,709 ft	120.1 km 74.6 mi	18.4095°N 64.6556°W
14	Gran Piedra	Cuba	Island of Cuba	1249 m 4,098 ft	500 m 1,640 ft	100.7 km 62.5 mi	20.0115°N 75.6270°W
15	Montagne Pelée	Martinique	Island of Martinique	1395 m 4,577 ft	1395 m 4,577 ft	80.8 km 50.2 mi	14.8092°N 61.1654°W
16	Morne Diablotins	Dominica	Island of Dominica	1447 m 4,747 ft	1447 m 4,747 ft	66.3 km 41.2 mi	15.5040°N 61.3981°W
17	Soufrière Hills Volcano	Montserrat	Island of Montserrat	914 m 2,999 ft	914 m 2,999 ft	65.1 km 40.4 mi	16.7123°N 62.1756°W
18	Mount Gimie	Saint Lucia	Island of Saint Lucia	950 m 3,117 ft	950 m 3,117 ft	59.8 km 37.2 mi	13.8637°N 61.0117°W
19	Loma Gajo en Medio	Dominican Republic	Island of Hispaniola	2279 m 7,477 ft	1779 m 5,837 ft	57.5 km 35.7 mi	18.6292°N 71.5108°W
20	Main Ridge (Note: The summit of Main Ridge is the highest point of Island of Tobago.) (Note: Main Ridge is the easternmost 500-meter (1640-foot) summit of the Caribbean.)	Trinidad and Tobago	Island of Tobogo	576 m 1,890 ft	576 m 1,890 ft	56.9 km 35.3 mi	11.2833°N 60.6333°W

== Gallery ==
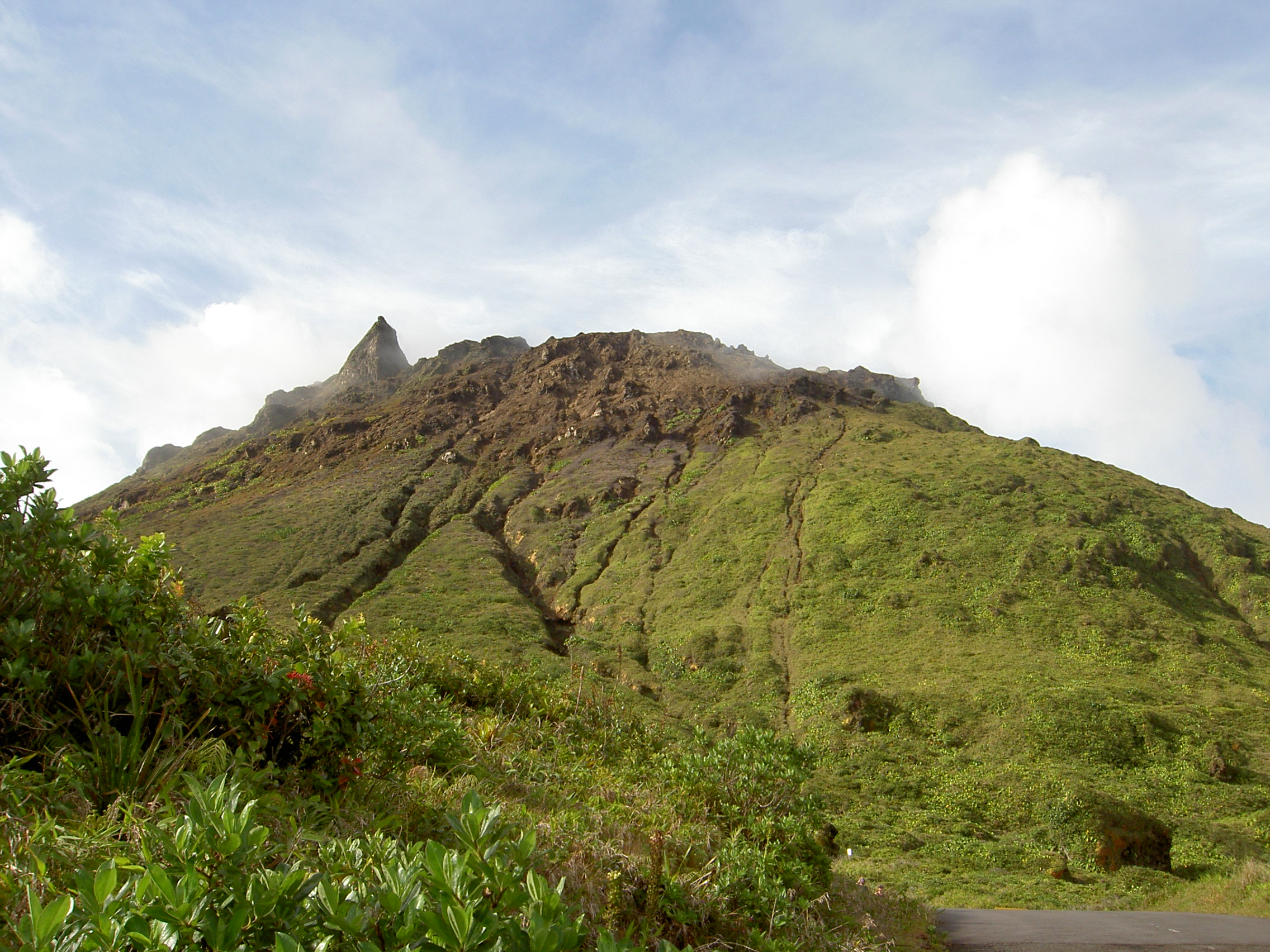
La Grande Soufrière is the highest point of île de Basse-Terre and the French Région Guadeloupe.

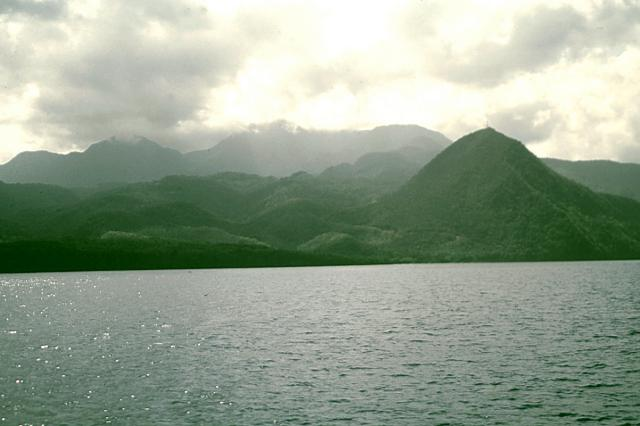
The active volcano Morne Diablotins is the highest point of the island and Commonwealth of Dominica.

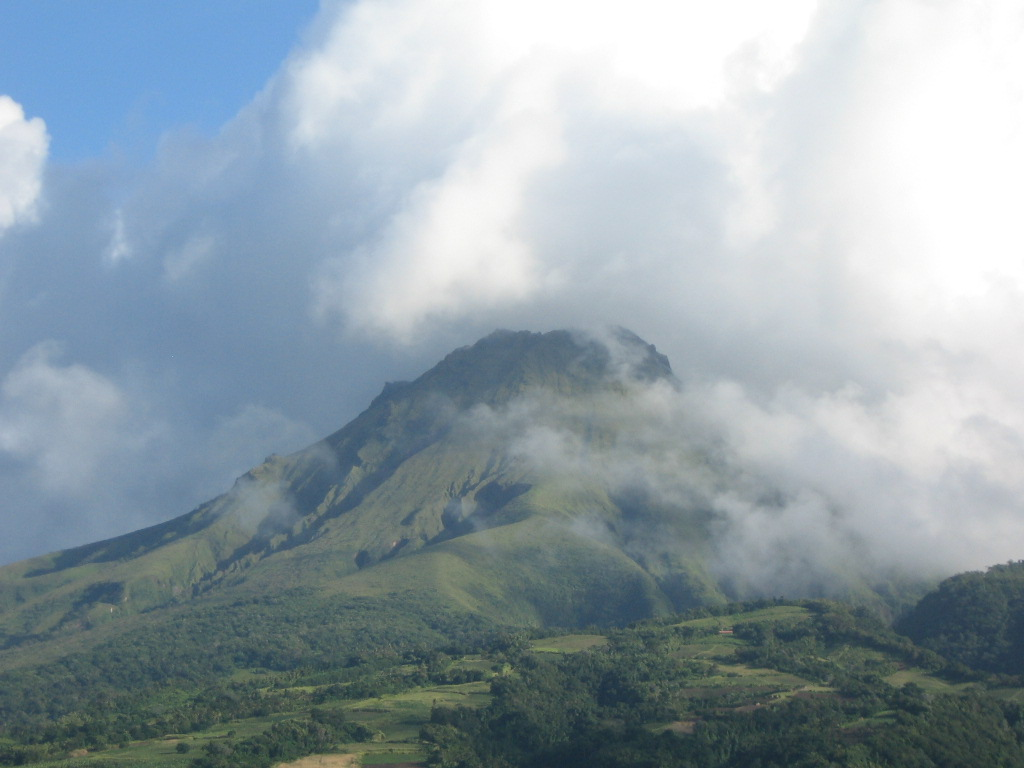
Montagne Pelée is the highest point of the island and French Région Martinique.

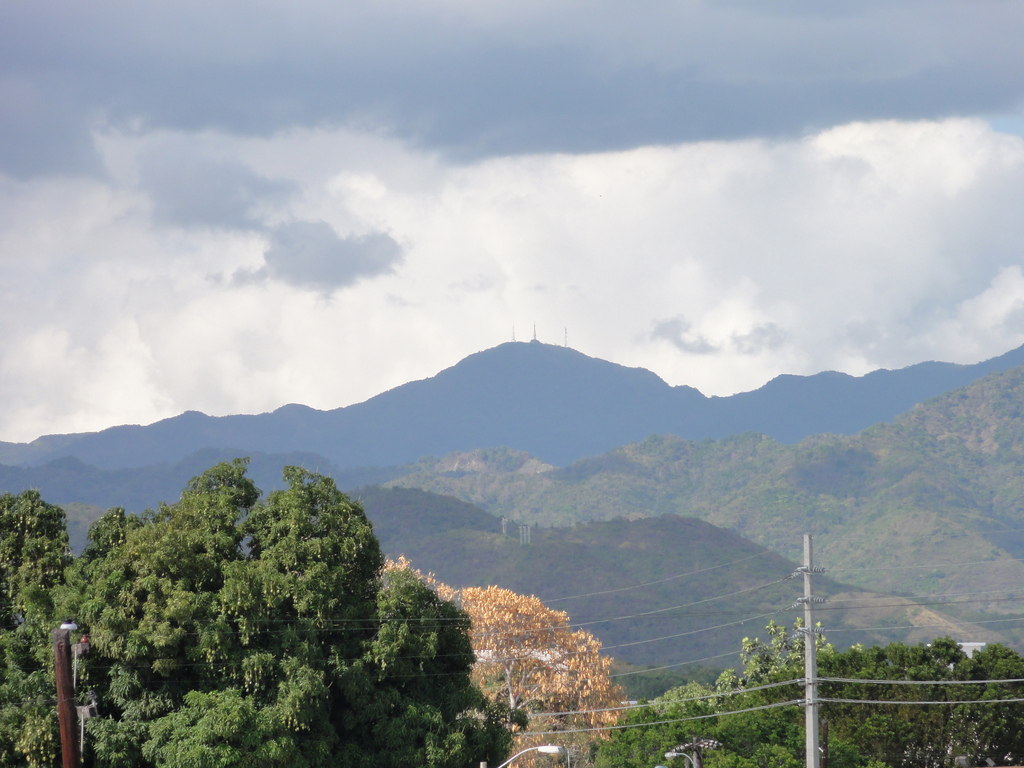
Cerro de Punta is the highest point of the island and Commonwealth of Puerto Rico.

== See also ==
- List of mountain peaks of North America
  - List of mountain peaks of Greenland
  - List of mountain peaks of Canada
  - List of mountain peaks of the Rocky Mountains
  - List of mountain peaks of the United States
  - List of mountain peaks of México
  - List of mountain peaks of Central America
  - List of mountain peaks of the Caribbean
    - List of the ultra-prominent summits of the Caribbean
    - List of extreme summits of the Caribbean
- Caribbean
  - Geography of the Caribbean
  - Geology of the Caribbean
    - Category:Mountains of the Caribbean
      - commons:Category:Mountains of the Caribbean
- Physical geography
  - Topography
    - Topographic elevation
    - Topographic prominence
    - Topographic isolation
