= List of extreme summits of the Caribbean =

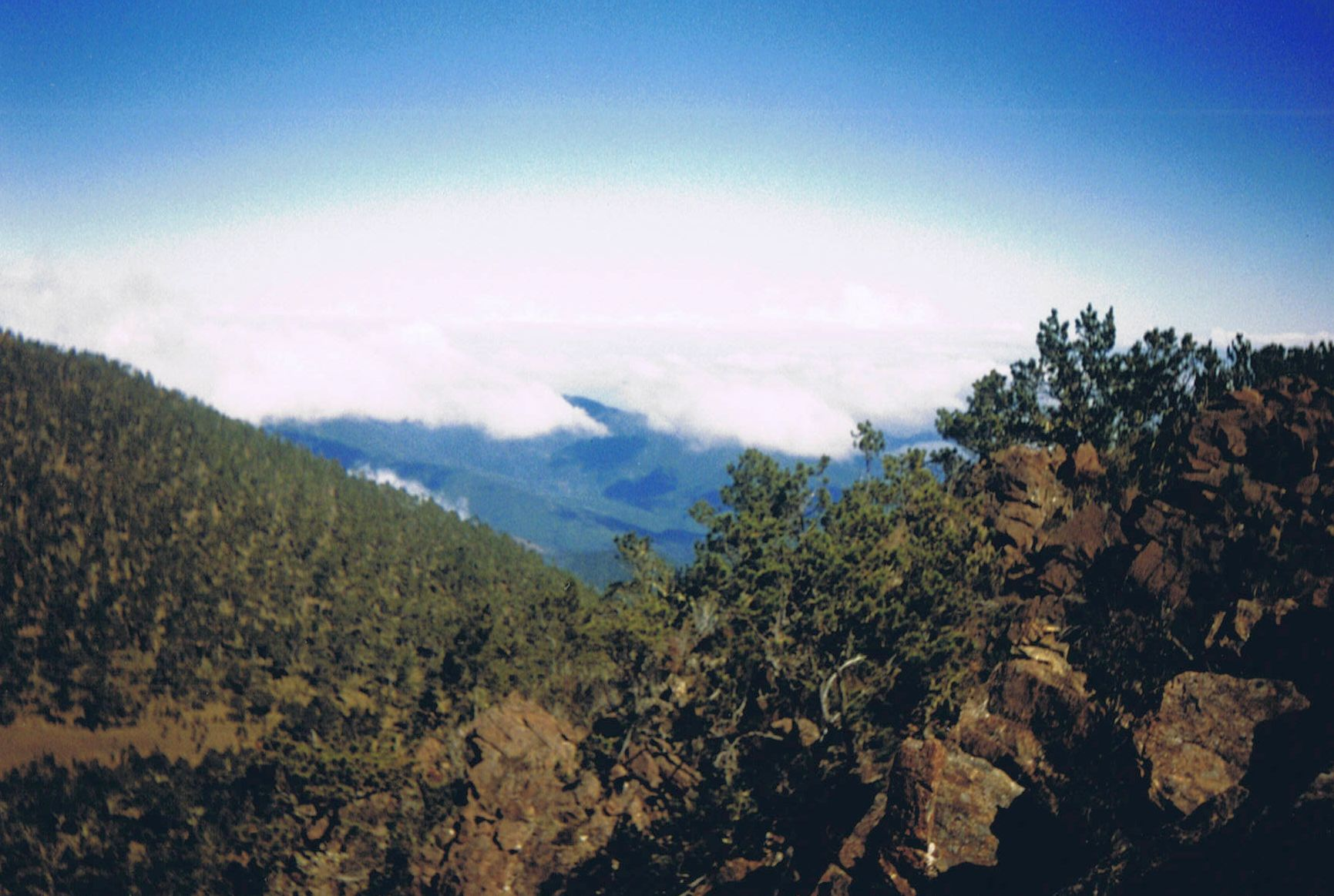
Pico Duarte is the highest point in the Dominican Republic, the Island of Hispaniola, and the entire Caribbean.

This article comprises four sortable tables of major mountain summits of the Caribbean that are the higher than any other point north or south of their latitude or east or west their longitude in the region.

The summit of a mountain or hill may be measured in three principal ways:

1. The topographic elevation of a summit measures the height of the summit above a geodetic sea level.
2. The topographic prominence of a summit is a measure of how high the summit rises above its surroundings.
3. The topographic isolation (or radius of dominance) of a summit measures how far the summit lies from its nearest point of equal elevation.

== Northernmost high summits ==
The northernmost summits of their elevation in the Caribbean
Rank	Mountain Peak	Country	Island	Elevation	Prominence	Isolation	Location
4	Pico San Juan (Note: Pico San Juan is the northernmost and westernmost 1000-meter (3281-foot) summit of the Caribbean.)	Cuba	Island of Cuba	1140 m 3,740 ft	500 m 1,640 ft	408 km 253 mi	21.9853°N 80.1327°W
3	Gran Piedra (Note: Gran Piedra is the northernmost summit of its elevation in the Caribbean.)	Cuba	Island of Cuba	1249 m 4,098 ft	500 m 1,640 ft	100.7 km 62.5 mi	20.0115°N 75.6270°W
2	Pico Turquino (Note: The summit of Pico Turquino is the highest point of the island and Republic of Cuba.) (Note: Pico Turquino is the northernmost and westernmost ultra-prominent summit of the Caribbean.)	Cuba	Island of Cuba	1974 m 6,476 ft	1974 m 6,476 ft	217 km 134.7 mi	19.9898°N 76.8360°W
1	Pico Duarte (Note: The summit of Pico Duarte is the highest point of the Dominican Republic, the Island of Hispaniola, and all islands of the Caribbean Sea.)	Dominican Republic	Island of Hispaniola	3098 m 10,164 ft	3098 m 10,164 ft	941 km 584 mi	19.0231°N 70.9977°W

== Southernmost high summits ==
The southernmost summits of their elevation in the Caribbean
Rank	Mountain Peak	Country	Island	Elevation	Prominence	Isolation	Location
9	Aripo Peak (Note: The summit of Aripo Peak is the highest point of the island of Trinidad and the Republic of Trinidad and Tobago.) (Note: Aripo Peak is the southernmost 500-meter (1640-foot) summit of the Caribbean.)	Trinidad and Tobago	Island of Trinidad	940 m 3,084 ft	940 m 3,084 ft	151.6 km 94.2 mi	10.7231°N 61.2499°W
8	La Soufrière (Note: The summit of La Soufrière is the highest point of the island of Saint Vincent and the nation of Saint Vincent and the Grenadines.) (Note: La Soufrière is the southernmost 1000-meter (3281-foot) summit of the Caribbean.)	Saint Vincent and the Grenadines	Island of Saint Vincent	1234 m 4,049 ft	1234 m 4,049 ft	161.7 km 100.5 mi	13.3477°N 61.1761°W
7	Montagne Pelée (Note: The summit of Montagne Pelée is the highest point of the island and French insular region of Martinique.) (Note: Montagne Pelée is the southernmost and easternmost summit of its elevation in the Caribbean.)	Martinique	Island of Martinique	1395 m 4,577 ft	1395 m 4,577 ft	80.8 km 50.2 mi	14.8092°N 61.1654°W
6	Morne Diablotins (Note: The summit of Morne Diablotins is the highest point of the island and Commonwealth of Dominica.) (Note: Morne Diablotins is the southernmost summit of its elevation in the Caribbean.)	Dominica	Island of Dominica	1447 m 4,747 ft	1447 m 4,747 ft	66.3 km 41.2 mi	15.5040°N 61.3981°W
5	La Grande Soufrière (Note: The summit of La Grande Soufrière is the highest point of île de Basse-Terre and the French Région Guadeloupe.) (Note: La Grande Soufrière is the southernmost and easternmost summit of its elevation in the Caribbean.)	Guadeloupe	île de Basse-Terre	1467 m 4,813 ft	1467 m 4,813 ft	699 km 434 mi	16.0449°N 61.6638°W
4	Blue Mountain Peak (Note: The summit of Blue Mountain Peak is the highest point of the island and the nation of Jamaica.) (Note: Blue Mountain Peak is the southernmost and westernmost 2000-meter (6562-foot) summit and ultra-prominent summit of the Caribbean.)	Jamaica	Island of Jamaica	2256 m 7,402 ft	2256 m 7,402 ft	273 km 169.5 mi	18.0465°N 76.5788°W
3	Pic la Selle (Note: The summit of Pic la Selle is the highest point of the Republic of Haiti.) (Note: Pic la Selle is the southernmost and westernmost summit of its elevation in the Caribbean.)	Haiti	Island of Hispaniola	2674 m 8,773 ft	2644 m 8,675 ft	126.6 km 78.7 mi	18.3602°N 71.9767°W
2	Loma Alto de la Bandera (Note: Loma Alto de la Bandera is the southernmost and easternmost summit of its elevation in the Caribbean.)	Dominican Republic	Island of Hispaniola	2842 m 9,324 ft	1512 m 4,961 ft	43.4 km 27 mi	18.8126°N 70.6268°W
1	Pico Duarte	Dominican Republic	Island of Hispaniola	3098 m 10,164 ft	3098 m 10,164 ft	941 km 584 mi	19.0231°N 70.9977°W

== Easternmost high summits ==
The easternmost summits of their elevation in the Caribbean
Rank	Mountain Peak	Country	Island	Elevation	Prominence	Isolation	Location
7	Main Ridge (Note: The summit of Main Ridge is the highest point of Island of Tobago.) (Note: Main Ridge is the easternmost 500-meter (1640-foot) summit of the Caribbean.)	Trinidad and Tobago	Island of Tobago	576 m 1,890 ft	576 m 1,890 ft	56.9 km 35.3 mi	11.2833°N 60.6333°W
6	Mount Gimie (Note: The summit of Mount Gimie is the highest point of the island and nation of Saint Lucia.) (Note: Mount Gimie is the easternmost summit of its elevation in the Caribbean.)	Saint Lucia	Island of Saint Lucia	950 m 3,117 ft	950 m 3,117 ft	59.8 km 37.2 mi	13.8637°N 61.0117°W
5	Montagne Pelée	Martinique	Island of Martinique	1395 m 4,577 ft	1395 m 4,577 ft	80.8 km 50.2 mi	14.8092°N 61.1654°W
4	Morne Diablotins	Dominica	Island of Dominica	1447 m 4,747 ft	1447 m 4,747 ft	66.3 km 41.2 mi	15.5040°N 61.3981°W
3	La Grande Soufrière	Guadeloupe	île de Basse-Terre	1467 m 4,813 ft	1467 m 4,813 ft	699 km 434 mi	16.0449°N 61.6638°W
2	Loma Alto de la Bandera	Dominican Republic	Island of Hispaniola	2842 m 9,324 ft	1512 m 4,961 ft	43.4 km 27 mi	18.8126°N 70.6268°W
1	Pico Duarte	Dominican Republic	Island of Hispaniola	3098 m 10,164 ft	3098 m 10,164 ft	941 km 584 mi	19.0231°N 70.9977°W

== Westernmost high summits ==
The westernmost summits of their elevation in the Caribbean
Rank	Mountain Peak	Country	Island	Elevation	Prominence	Isolation	Location
6	Pico San Juan	Cuba	Island of Cuba	1140 m 3,740 ft	500 m 1,640 ft	408 km 253 mi	21.9853°N 80.1327°W
5	Pico Turquino	Cuba	Island of Cuba	1974 m 6,476 ft	1974 m 6,476 ft	217 km 134.7 mi	19.9898°N 76.8360°W
4	Blue Mountain Peak	Jamaica	Island of Jamaica	2256 m 7,402 ft	2256 m 7,402 ft	273 km 169.5 mi	18.0465°N 76.5788°W
3	Pic Macaya (Note: Pic Macaya is the westernmost summit of its elevation in the Caribbean.)	Haiti	Island of Hispaniola	2347 m 7,700 ft	2087 m 6,847 ft	216 km 134.5 mi	18.3822°N 74.0243°W
2	Pic la Selle	Haiti	Island of Hispaniola	2674 m 8,773 ft	2644 m 8,675 ft	126.6 km 78.7 mi	18.3602°N 71.9767°W
1	Pico Duarte	Dominican Republic	Island of Hispaniola	3098 m 10,164 ft	3098 m 10,164 ft	941 km 584 mi	19.0231°N 70.9977°W

== Gallery ==
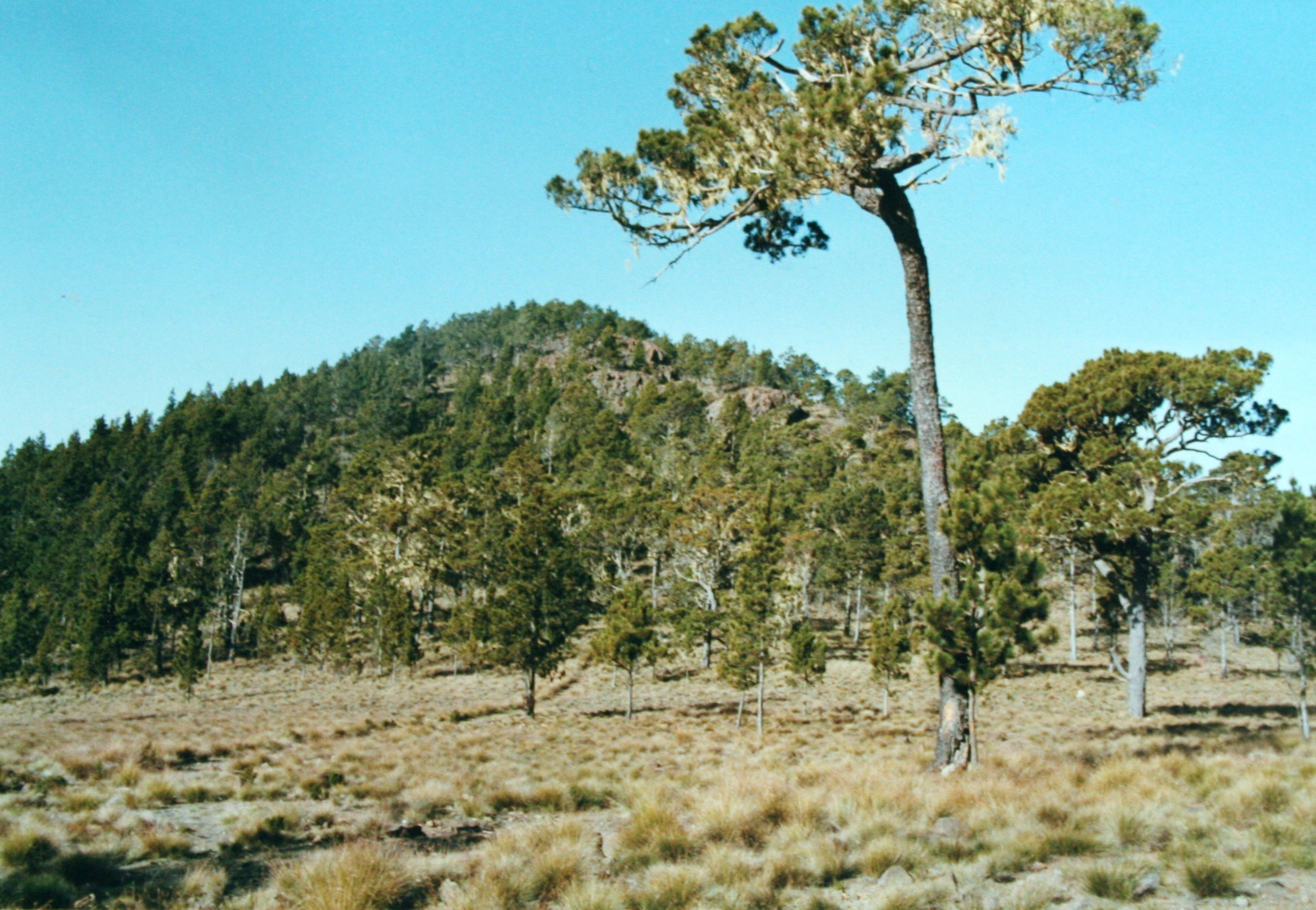
Pico Duarte is the highest summit of the Dominican Republic, the Island of Hispaniola, and the entire Caribbean.

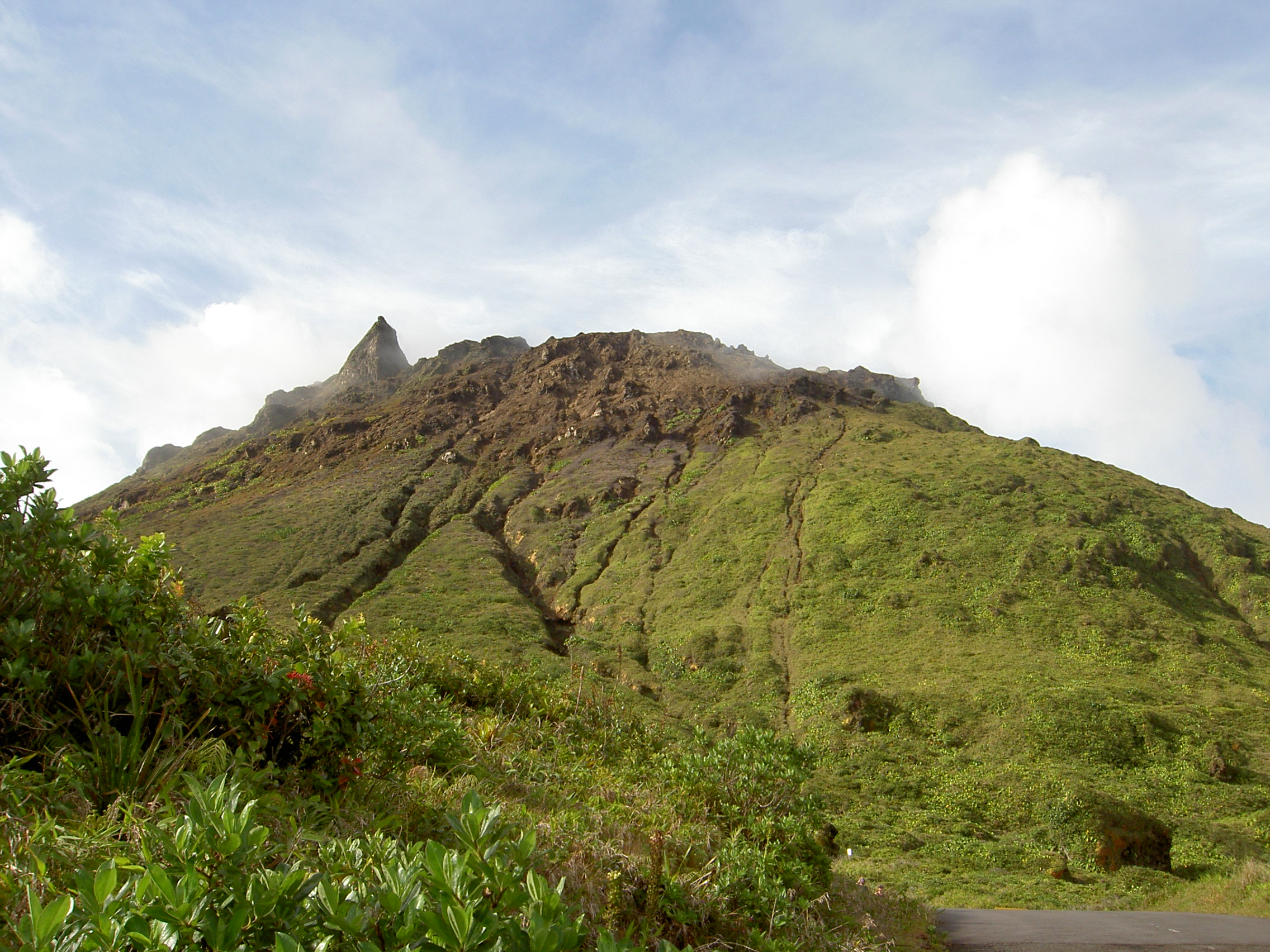
La Grande Soufrière is the highest point of île de Basse-Terre and the French Région Guadeloupe.

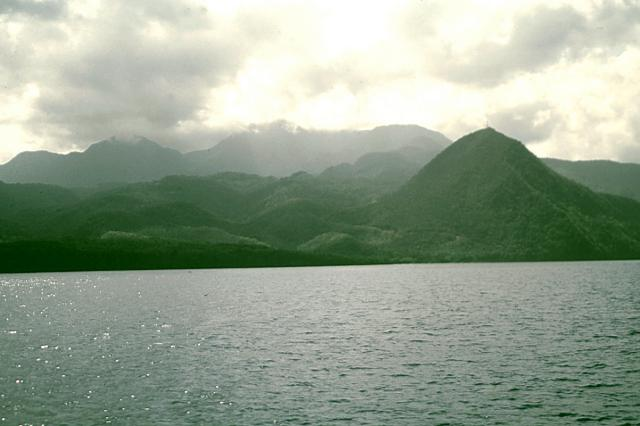
The active volcano Morne Diablotins is the highest point of the island and Commonwealth of Dominica.

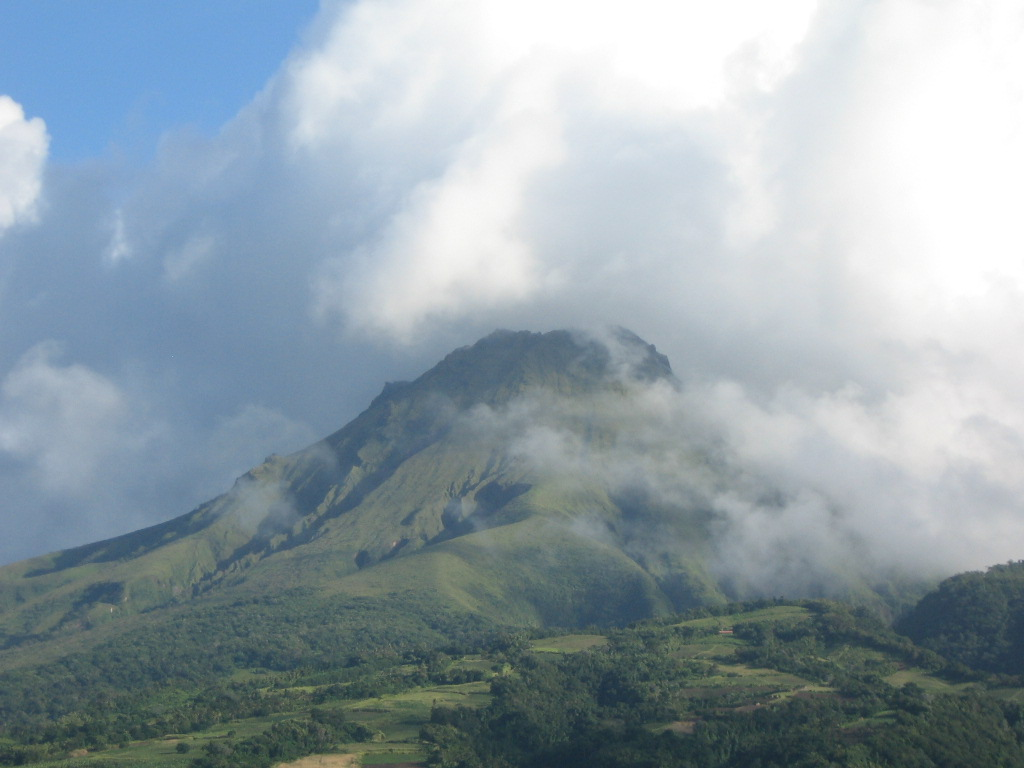
Montagne Pelée is the highest point of the island and French Région Martinique.

== See also ==
- List of mountain peaks of North America
  - List of mountain peaks of Greenland
  - List of mountain peaks of Canada
  - List of mountain peaks of the Rocky Mountains
  - List of mountain peaks of the United States
  - List of mountain peaks of México
  - List of mountain peaks of Central America
  - List of mountain peaks of the Caribbean
    - List of the ultra-prominent summits of the Caribbean
    - List of extreme summits of the Caribbean
- Caribbean
  - Geography of the Caribbean
  - Geology of the Caribbean
    - Category:Mountains of the Caribbean
      - commons:Category:Mountains of the Caribbean
- Physical geography
  - Topography
    - Topographic elevation
    - Topographic prominence
    - Topographic isolation
