= Dominican geography =

Dominican geography may refer to:

- Geography of the Dominican Republic
- Geography of Dominica
