= Geography of Saint Lucia =

Saint Lucia
Nickname: Helen of the West Indies
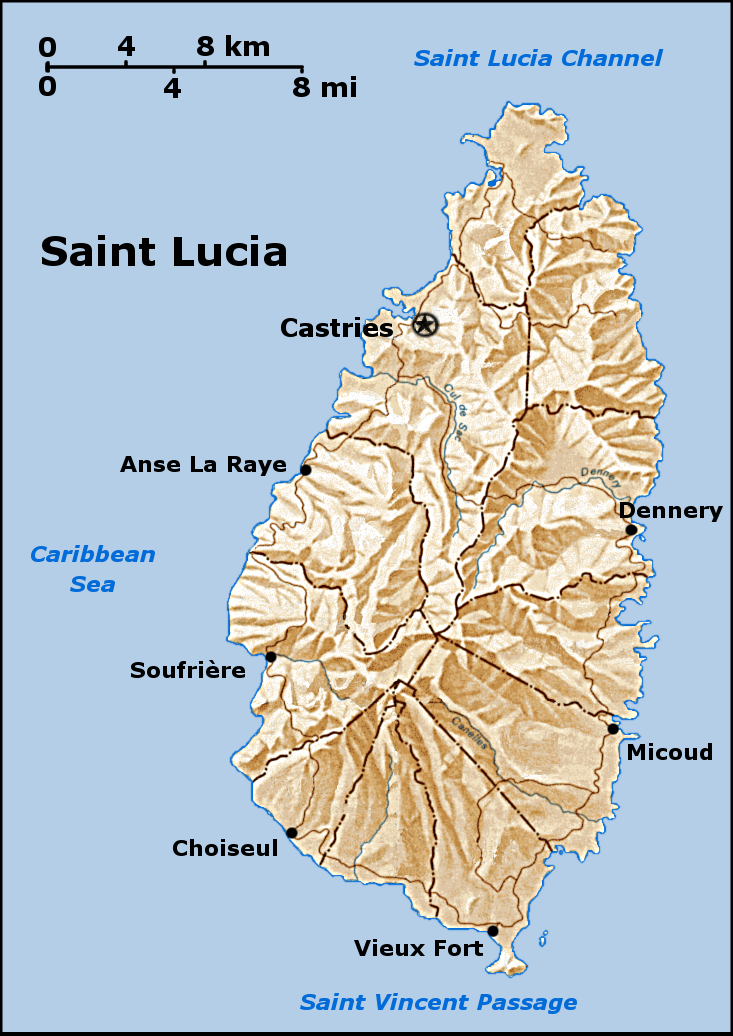
- Map of Saint Lucia

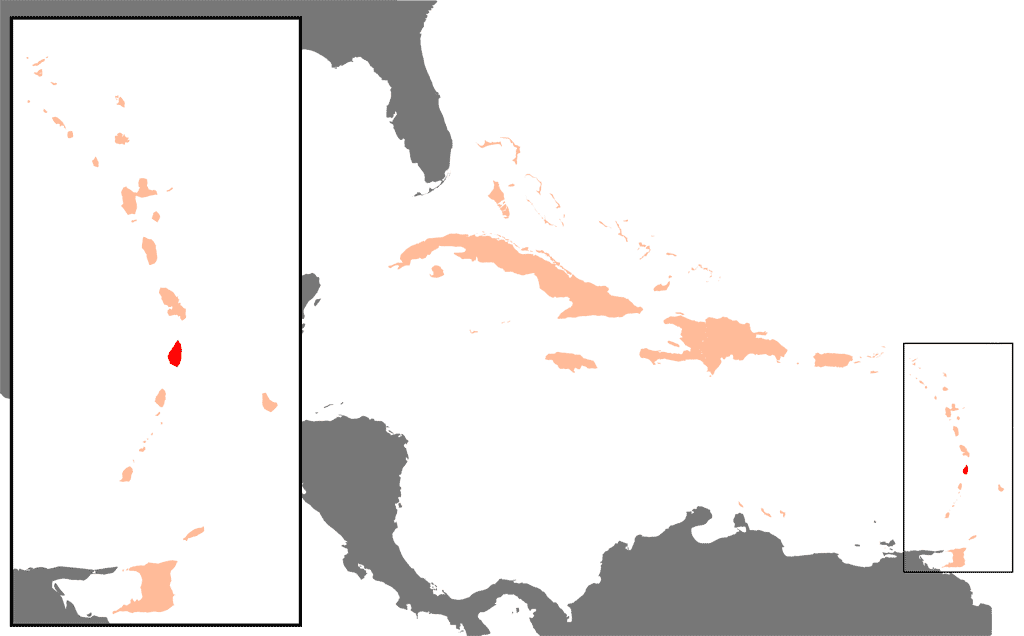

Geography
- Location: Caribbean Sea, Atlantic Ocean
- Coordinates: 13°53′N 60°58′W
- Archipelago: Windward Islands
- Area: 616 km^{2} (238 sq mi)
- Coastline: 158 km (98.2 mi)
- Highest elevation: 950 m (3120 ft)
- Highest point: Mount Gimie

Administration
- Saint Lucia
- District: 10
- Largest settlement: Castries (pop. 10,634)

Demographics
- Population: 160,765 (2005)
- Pop. density: 260.98/km^{2} (675.94/sq mi)
- Ethnic groups: African 82.5%, Mulatto 11.9%, East Indian 2.4%, White 1.0%, Other or unspecified 3.1%

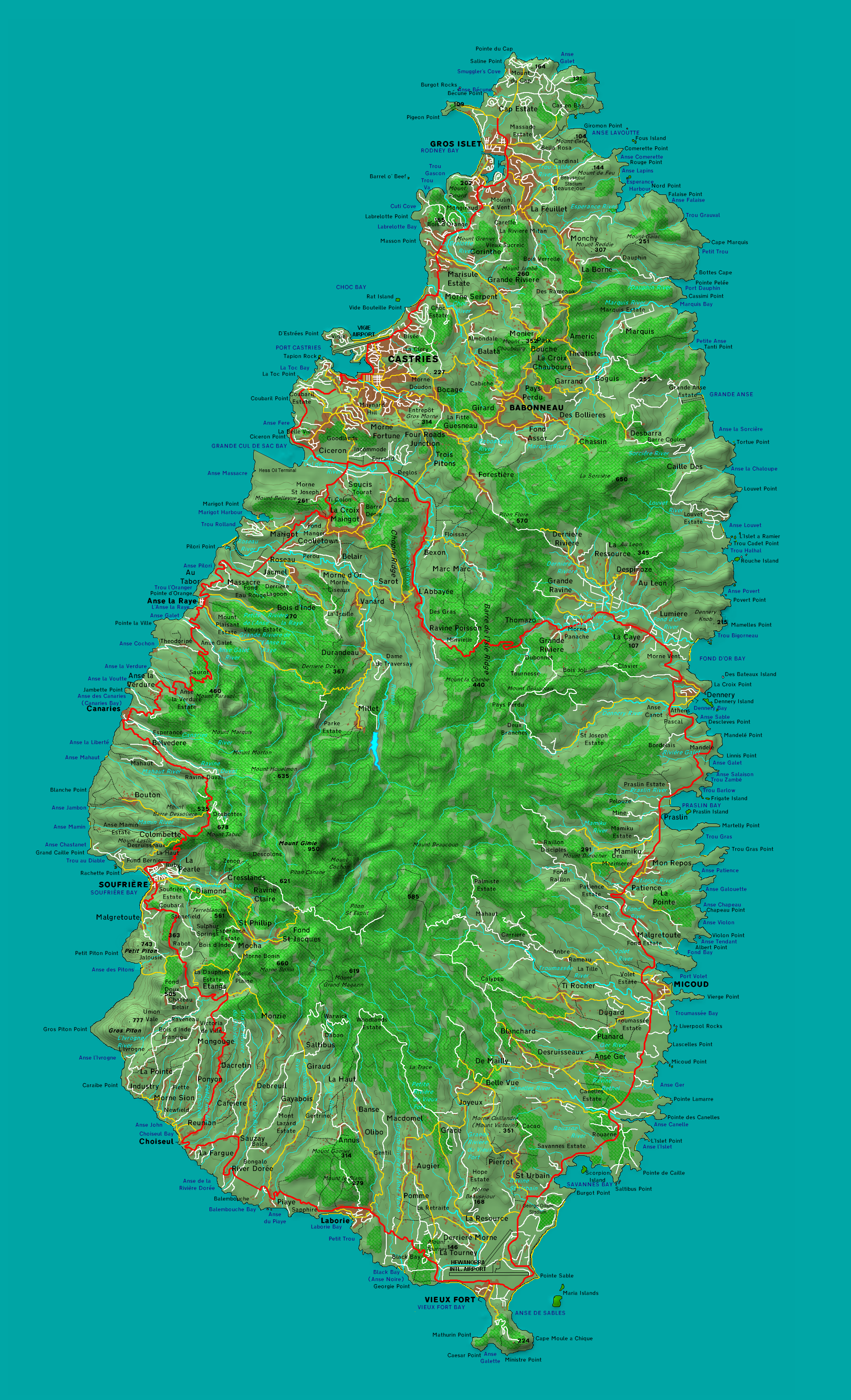
Map of Saint Lucia

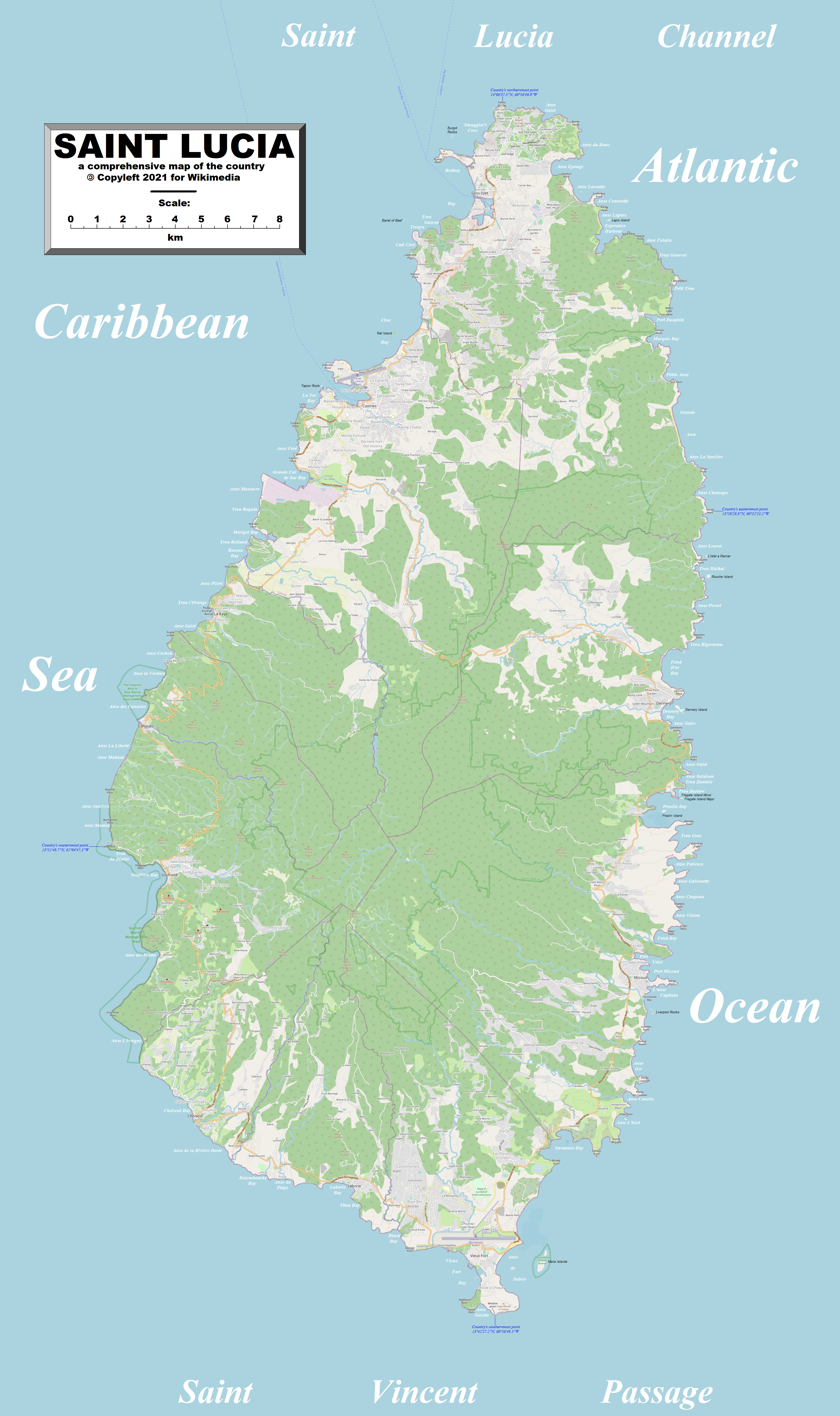
Enlargeable, detailed map of Saint Lucia

Saint Lucia is one of many small land masses composing the insular group known as the Windward Islands. Unlike large limestone areas such as Florida, Cuba, and the Yucatan Peninsula, or the Bahamas, which is a small island group composed of coral and sand, Saint Lucia is a typical Windward Island formation of volcanic rock that came into existence long after much of the region had already been formed.

Saint Lucia's physical features are notable. Dominated by high peaks and rain forests in the interior, the 616-square-kilometer (238-square-mile) island is known for the twin peaks of Gros Piton (13°48′36″N 61°04′03″W) and Petit Piton (13°49′59″N 61°03′49″W) on the southwestern coast, its soft sandy beaches, and its magnificent natural harbours. Mount Gimie, the highest peak, is located in the central mountain range and rises to 958 meters (3,143 ft) above sea level, a contrast that is also evident in the abrupt climatic transition from coastal to inland areas. The steep terrain also accentuates the many rivers that flow from central Saint Lucia to the Caribbean. Fertile land holdings, which support banana farming, are scattered throughout the island.

Saint Lucia has a tropical, humid climate moderated by northeast trade winds that allow for pleasant year-round conditions. Mean annual temperatures range from 26 °C (78.8 °F) to 32 °C (89.6 °F) at sea level and drop to an average of 13 °C (55.4 °F) in the mountain peaks. The abundant annual rainfall accumulates to approximately 2,000 millimeters (78.7 in), with most precipitation occurring during the June to December wet season. Hurricanes are the most severe climatic disturbance in this area and have been known to cause extensive damage. Although Saint Lucia has historically been spared from serious hurricane destruction, Hurricane Allen decimated the agricultural sector and claimed nine lives in 1980. More recently, in 2010, Hurricane Tomas claimed seven lives and also caused extensive agricultural damage, particularly to the island's burgeoning cocoa crop.

== General ==
Saint Lucia is in the Caribbean, an island between the Caribbean Sea and North Atlantic Ocean, north of Saint Vincent and north-west of Barbados. The capital city of Saint Lucia is Castries, where about one third of the population lives. Major towns include Gros Islet, Soufrière and Vieux Fort.

=== Measurements ===
- total area: 616 km^{2} (238 sq mi)
- length: 43.5 km (27.0 mi)
- width: 22.5 km (14.0 mi)
- comparative area: The same as Toronto or 3.5 times the size of Washington, DC
- Coastline: 158 km (98 mi)

=== Maritime claims ===
- 200 nautical miles (370.4 km; 230.2 mi)
- contiguous zone: 24 nautical miles (44.4 km; 27.6 mi)
- exclusive economic zone: 200 nautical miles (370.4 km; 230.2 mi)
- territorial sea: 12 nautical miles (22.2 km; 13.8 mi)

== Climate ==
Saint Lucia is in the tropical zone, although its climate is moderated by northeast trade winds. Since it is fairly close to the equator, and the surrounding sea surface temperature only fluctuates 3°C (25-28°C) the coastal air temperature does not fluctuate much between winter and summer. The dry season is from December to June, and the rainy season is from June to November. Average daytime temperatures are around 30 °C (86.0 °F), and average night time temperatures are around 24 °C (75.2 °F). Average annual rainfall ranges from 1,300 mm (51.2 in) on the coast to 3,810 mm (150 in) in the mountain rainforests.

Climate data for St Lucia
Month	Jan	Feb	Mar	Apr	May	Jun	Jul	Aug	Sep	Oct	Nov	Dec	Year
Mean daily maximum °C (°F)	29 (84)	29 (84)	29 (84)	30 (86)	31 (88)	31 (88)	31 (88)	31 (88)	31 (88)	31 (88)	30 (86)	29 (84)	30 (86)
Daily mean °C (°F)	26 (79)	26 (79)	26 (79)	27 (81)	28 (82)	28 (82)	28 (82)	28 (82)	28 (82)	28 (82)	27 (81)	26 (79)	27 (81)
Mean daily minimum °C (°F)	23 (73)	23 (73)	24 (75)	24 (75)	25 (77)	25 (77)	25 (77)	25 (77)	25 (77)	25 (77)	24 (75)	24 (75)	24 (76)
Average precipitation mm (inches)	125 (4.9)	95 (3.7)	75 (3.0)	90 (3.5)	125 (4.9)	200 (7.9)	245 (9.6)	205 (8.1)	225 (8.9)	260 (10.2)	215 (8.5)	160 (6.3)	2,020 (79.5)
Average precipitation days	14	9	10	10	11	15	18	16	17	20	18	16	174
Mean monthly sunshine hours	248	226	248	240	248	240	248	248	240	217	240	248	2,891
Source: climatestotravel

== Terrain ==
Volcanic and mountainous with some broad, fertile valleys.

=== Extreme points ===
- Northernmost point: Pointe du Cap, Gros Islet Quarter, 14°06′37″N 60°56′41″W
- Southernmost point: Ministre Point, Vieux Fort Quarter, 13°42′29″N 60°56′50″W
- Westernmost point: Grande Caille Point, Soufrière Quarter, 13°51′48″N 61°04′45″W
- Easternmost point: Louvet Point, Gros Islet Quarter, 13°58′29″N 60°52′25″W
- lowest point: Caribbean Sea Sea level
- highest point: Mount Gimie elevation: 950 m (3,120 ft), 13°51′48″N 61°00′40″W

=== Natural resources ===
Saint Lucia has forests, sandy beaches, minerals (pumice), mineral springs, and a geothermal potential.

=== Land use ===
About 18% of the land is used for agricultural practices. Most farms consist of less than 5 acres of land. The main agricultural products grown in Saint Lucia are bananas, coconuts, cocoa beans, mangoes, avocados, vegetables, citrus fruits, and root crops such as yams and sweet potatoes. Most of these agricultural products are grown for local consumption, but bananas and coconuts are mainly grown for export, with some vegetables. Bananas occupy about 14,826 acres of the agricultural land, while coconuts occupy 12,400 acres.

Saint Lucia Land Usage as of 2018
Type	Percent	Area
Total Agricultural Land	17.4	107.2 km^{2} (41.4 sq mi)
arable land	4.9	30.2 km^{2} (11.7 sq mi)
permanent crops	11.5	70.8 km^{2} (27.3 sq mi)
permanent pasture	1.0	6.2 km^{2} (2.4 sq mi)
irrigated land	2	30 km^{2} (12 sq mi) (2012 est.)
Forests and woodland	77.0	474.3 km^{2} (183.1 sq mi)
Other	5.6	34.5 km^{2} (13.3 sq mi)

Forest reserves and botanical gardens in Saint Lucia:

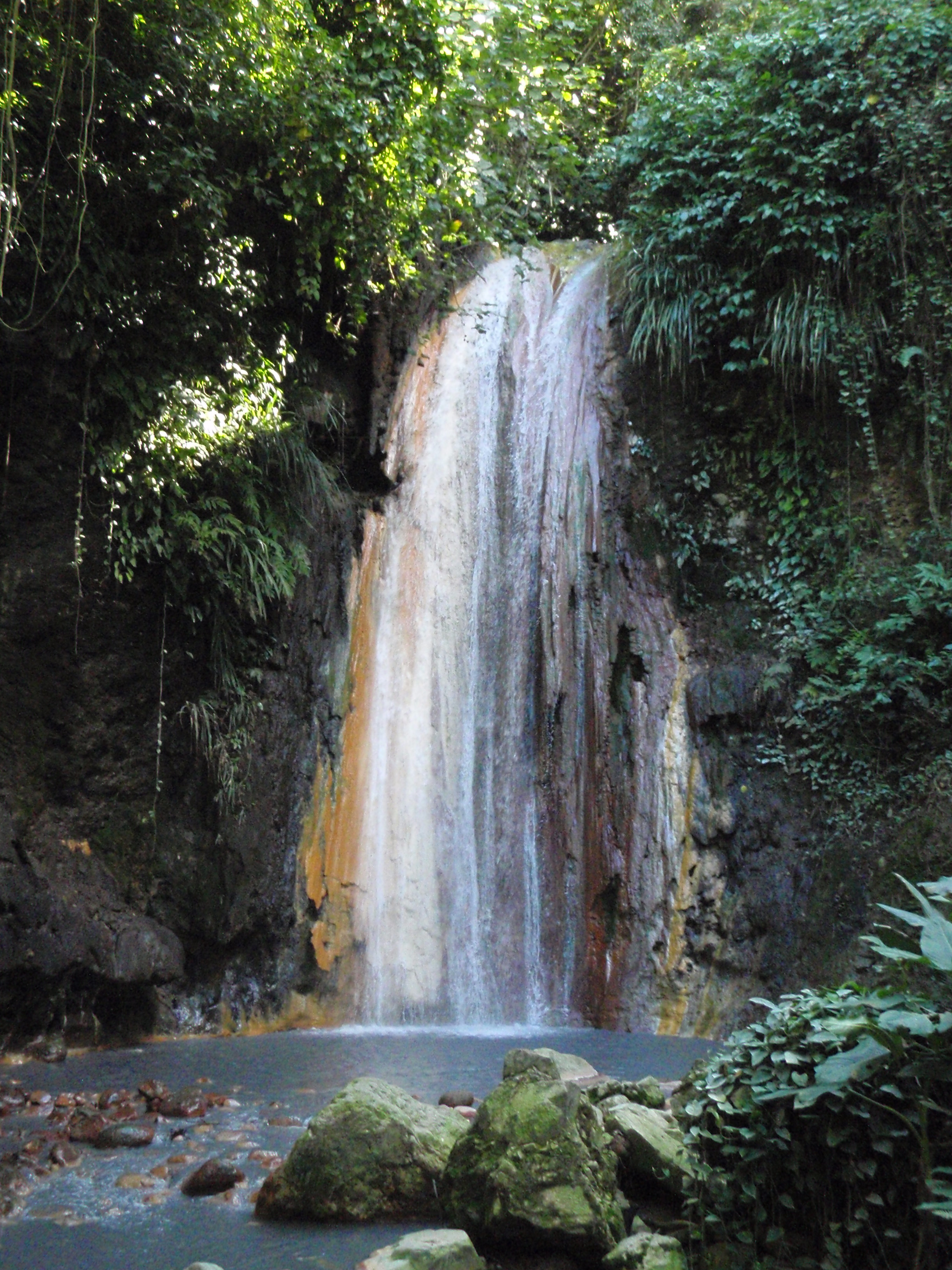
Diamond Falls at Diamond Botanical Gardens

- Castries Waterworks Forest Reserve, 13°58′38″N 60°55′16″W
- Dennery Waterworks Forest Reserve, 13°53′30″N 60°55′05″W
- Edmond Forest Nature Reserve, 13°50′23″N 60°59′58″W
- Frigate Island Nature Reserve, 13°52′46″N 60°53′01″W
- Grand Bois Forest Reserve
- Maria Island Nature Reserve, 13°43′33″N 60°55′51″W
- Quilesse Forest Reserve, 13°50′41″N 60°58′28″W
- Savannes Bay Nature Reserve, 13°45′47″N 60°55′25″W
- St. Lucia Botanical Gardens (also known as Diamond Botanical Gardens, part of the Soufrière Estate)

== Islands ==
The island of the island nation of Saint Lucia include the following:

- Burgot Rocks, 14°05′55″N 60°57′42″W
- Dennery Island, 13°54′32″N 60°53′03″W
- Des Bateaux Island, 13°55′01″N 60°52′44″W
- Fourreur Island, 14°04′16″N 60°58′42″W
- Fous Island, 14°04′55″N 60°54′23″W
- Frigate Island, 13°52′46″N 60°53′00″W
- L'Islet a Ramier, 13°57′35″N 60°52′30″W
- Laplins Island, 14°04′17″N 60°54′29″W
- Liverpool Rocks, 13°48′33″N 60°53′36″W
- Maria Islands, 13°43′33″N 60°55′52″W
- Pigeon Island, 14°05′34″N 60°57′53″W
- Praslin Island, 13°52′31″N 60°53′23″W
- Rat Island, 14°02′01″N 60°58′54″W
- Rouche Island (also called Barrel O'Beef), 13°57′12″N 60°52′28″W
- Scorpion Island, 13°45′56″N 60°55′22″W

== Districts ==
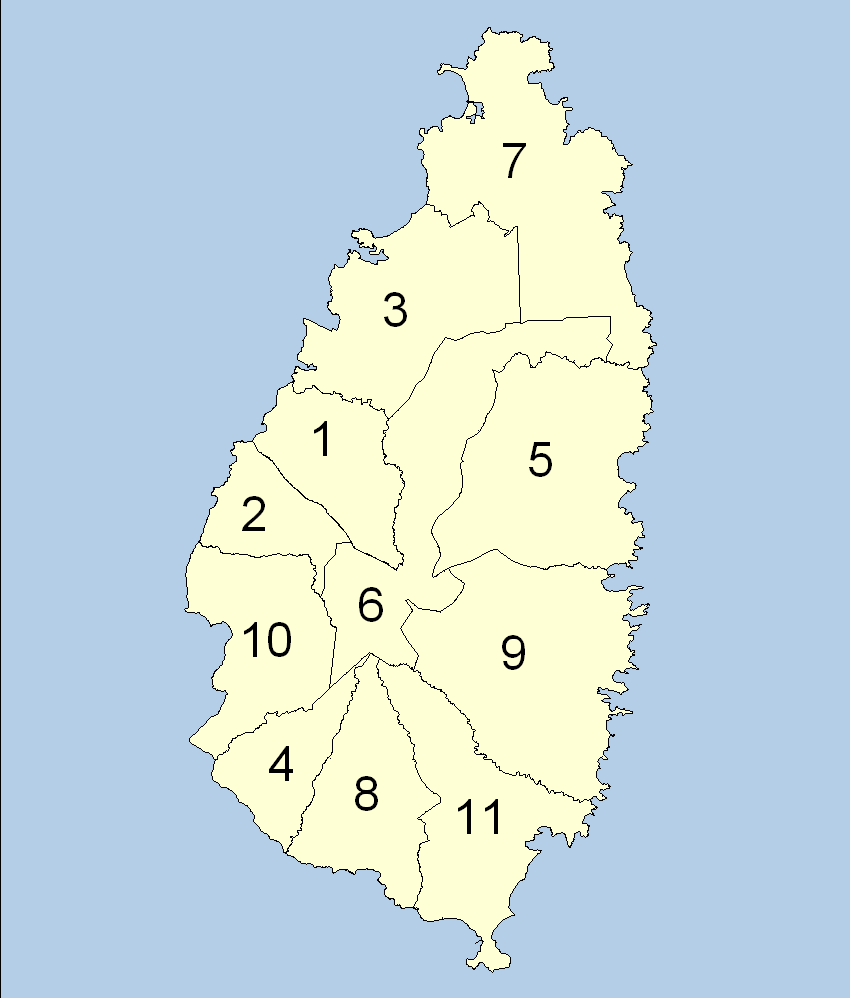
Districts of Saint Lucia and the forest reserve

The island of Saint Lucia is divided into 10 Districts and the Forest Reserve:

1. Anse la Raye, Leeward Caribbean Sea
2. Canaries, Leeward Caribbean Sea
3. Castries, Leeward Caribbean Sea
4. Choiseul, Leeward Caribbean Sea
5. Dennery, Windward Atlantic Ocean
6. Grand Bois Forest Reserve, Internal (entrance at 13°55′31″N 61°00′33″W)
7. Gros Islet, Leeward Caribbean Sea, Windward Atlantic Ocean
8. Laborie, Leeward Caribbean Sea
9. Micoud, Windward Atlantic Ocean
10. Soufrière, Leeward Caribbean Sea
11. Vieux Fort, Windward Atlantic Ocean, Leeward Caribbean Sea

== Natural hazards ==
The island country of Saint Lucia is affected by hurricanes and volcanic activity. The island was severely affected by Hurricane Allen in 1980 and Hurricane Tomas in 2010, causing agricultural damage and a drop in visitor arrivals, but Saint Lucia has generally had fewer hurricanes than many other Caribbean islands, due to its southerly location. Hurricanes and volcanoes would both damage the coral.

== Environment ==
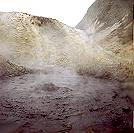
Sulphur Springs, 13°50′16″N 61°02′44″W

Current issues include deforestation and soil erosion, particularly in the northern region.

Saint Lucia is party to the following treaties and conventions:

- Ballast Water Management Convention
- Climate Change-Kyoto Protocol
- Convention on Biological Diversity
- Endangered Species
- Environmental Modification Convention
- International Convention for the Regulation of Whaling
- International Plant Protection Convention
- London Convention on the Prevention of Marine Pollution by Dumping of Wastes and Other Matter
- United Nations Convention on the Law of the Sea
- United Nations Convention to Combat Desertification
- United Nations Framework Convention on Climate Change
- Vienna Convention for the Protection of the Ozone Layer

=== REDD+ reference levels and monitoring ===
Under the UNFCCC REDD+ framework, Saint Lucia has submitted two national forest reference level (FRL) packages. On the UNFCCC REDD+ Web Platform, the country's 2021 package is listed as having an assessed reference level, while its 2023 package is listed as under technical assessment; for both packages, a national strategy, safeguards and a national forest monitoring system are listed as "not reported".

The first assessed FRL, submitted in 2021 and technically assessed in 2022, covered four REDD+ activities at national scale: reducing emissions from deforestation, reducing emissions from forest degradation, conservation of forest carbon stocks, and enhancement of forest carbon stocks. Using a 2001-2013 reference period, the original submission proposed 24,200 t CO2 eq per year, but the assessed FRL was revised to -121,333 t CO2 eq per year; the technical assessment states that it included CO2, CH_{4} and N_{2}O and covered above-ground biomass, below-ground biomass, dead organic matter and soil organic carbon.

A second national FRL/FREL submission, made in 2023 and listed on the platform as under technical assessment, again covered four of the five REDD+ activities, excluding sustainable management of forests. According to the submission, it used a 2016-2020 reference period and proposed a benchmark of -251,126 t CO2 eq per year for 2021-2025.

== See also ==
- Districts of Saint Lucia
- Demographics of Saint Lucia
- Economy of Saint Lucia
- List of rivers of Saint Lucia
