= Pic Macaya =

Mountain in Haiti

- Macaya Peak
- Location within Haiti

Highest point
- Elevation: 2,347 m (7,700 ft)
- Prominence: 2,097 m (6,880 ft)
- Listing: North America prominent peak 86th; North America isolated peaks 95th; Ribu
- Coordinates: 18°22′57″N 74°01′30″W

Geography
- Location: Haiti
- Parent range: Massif de la Hotte

Pic Macaya (Macaya Peak) is the second-highest mountain in Haiti (after Pic la Selle), rising to an elevation of 2,347 metres (7,700 feet) above sea level. It is located in the Massif de la Hotte, 36 kilometres (22 miles) northwest of Les Cayes and 195 km (121 mi) west of Port-au-Prince. The mountain is located in the Pic Macaya National Park.

Pic Macaya is a source of water generation and has rich soil that support its dense pine forests. It has a high concentration of biodiversity with numerous endemic species and is also a nesting location for the endangered Black-capped petrel.

== See also ==
- Pic Macaya National Park
- List of national parks of Haiti
- List of Ultras of the Caribbean
