= Loma Gajo en Medio =

- Location within the Dominican Republic

Highest point
- Elevation: 2,279 m (7,477 ft)
- Prominence: 1,779 m (5,837 ft)
- Isolation: 56.87 km (35.34 mi)
- Listing: Ultra; Ribu
- Coordinates: 18°38′8″N 71°31′20″W

Geography
- Parent range: Hispaniola

Loma Gajo en Medio is a mountain located in San Juan, Dominican Republic. It is an ultra-prominent peak. It has an elevation of 2,279 m (7,477 ft).

== See also ==
List of ultras of the Caribbean
