= Cerro El Copey National Park =

National park in Venezuela

Cerro El Copey National Park Parque Nacional Cerro El Copey
- IUCN category II (national park)
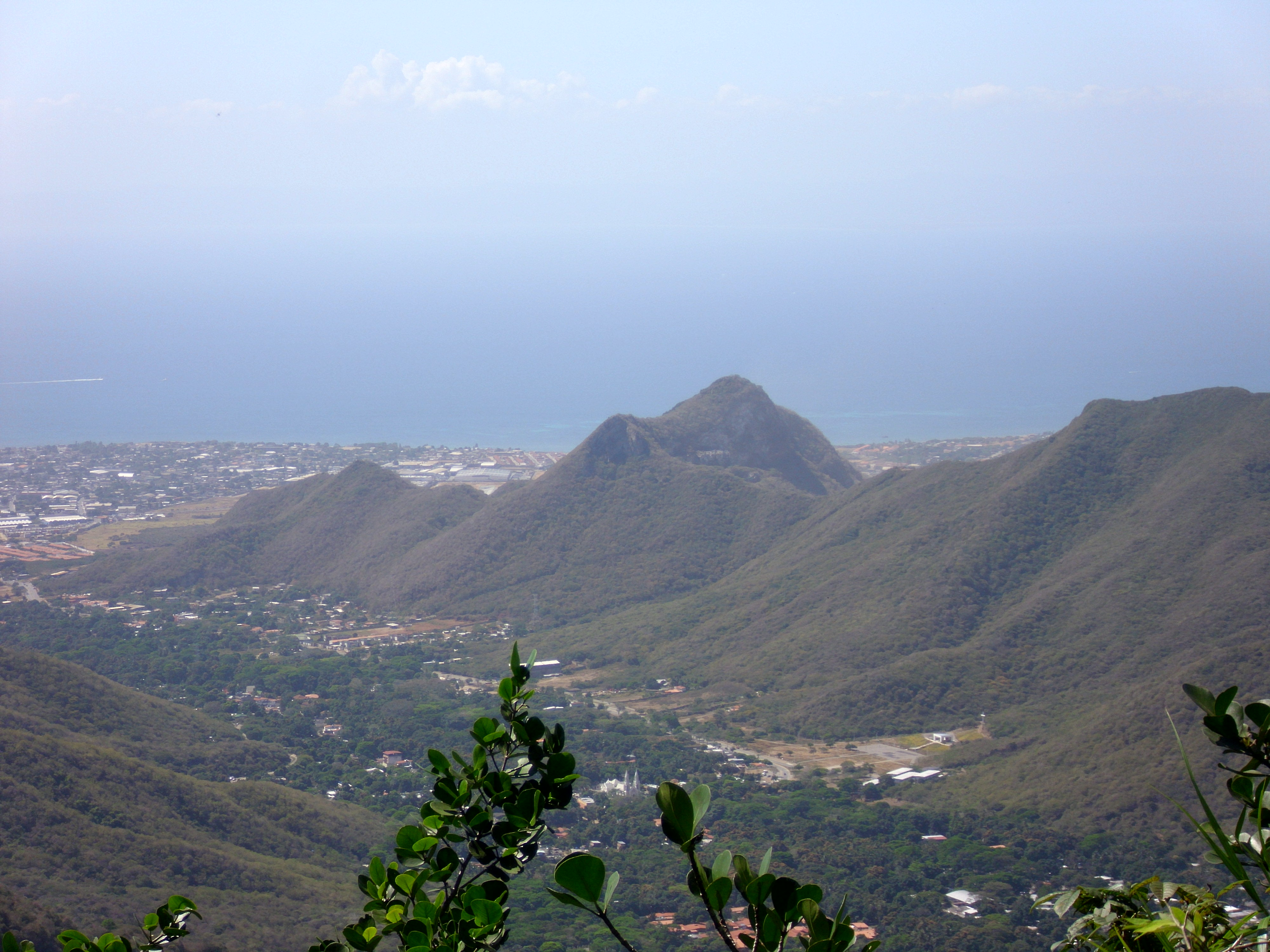

- Location within Venezuela
- Location: Venezuela
- Coordinates: 10°59′N 63°53′W
- Area: 71 km^{2} (27 sq mi)
- Established: February 27, 1974

The Cerro El Copey National Park (Spanish: Parque nacional Cerro El Copey) Also Cerro El Copey-Jóvito Villalba National Park Is a protected area with the status of a national park located to the east of the Caribbean island of Margarita, in the highest mountainous region of Nueva Esparta State in Venezuela.

The park was created in 1974 with the purpose of protecting an outstanding physiographic feature with an ecosystem that includes several plant formations, high levels of endemism and the only permanent water sources of the island. It has been designated an Important Bird Area (IBA) by BirdLife International because it supports significant populations of several bird species.

Though it is surrounded by desert plains, because of its 960 m elevation the park has green forests and montane grasslands that feed on the humidity provided by the trade winds. In the lower areas, dry and semi-deciduous forests predominate. It is surrounded by villages and plantations, some of which have recently invaded the grounds of the park.

== Gallery ==
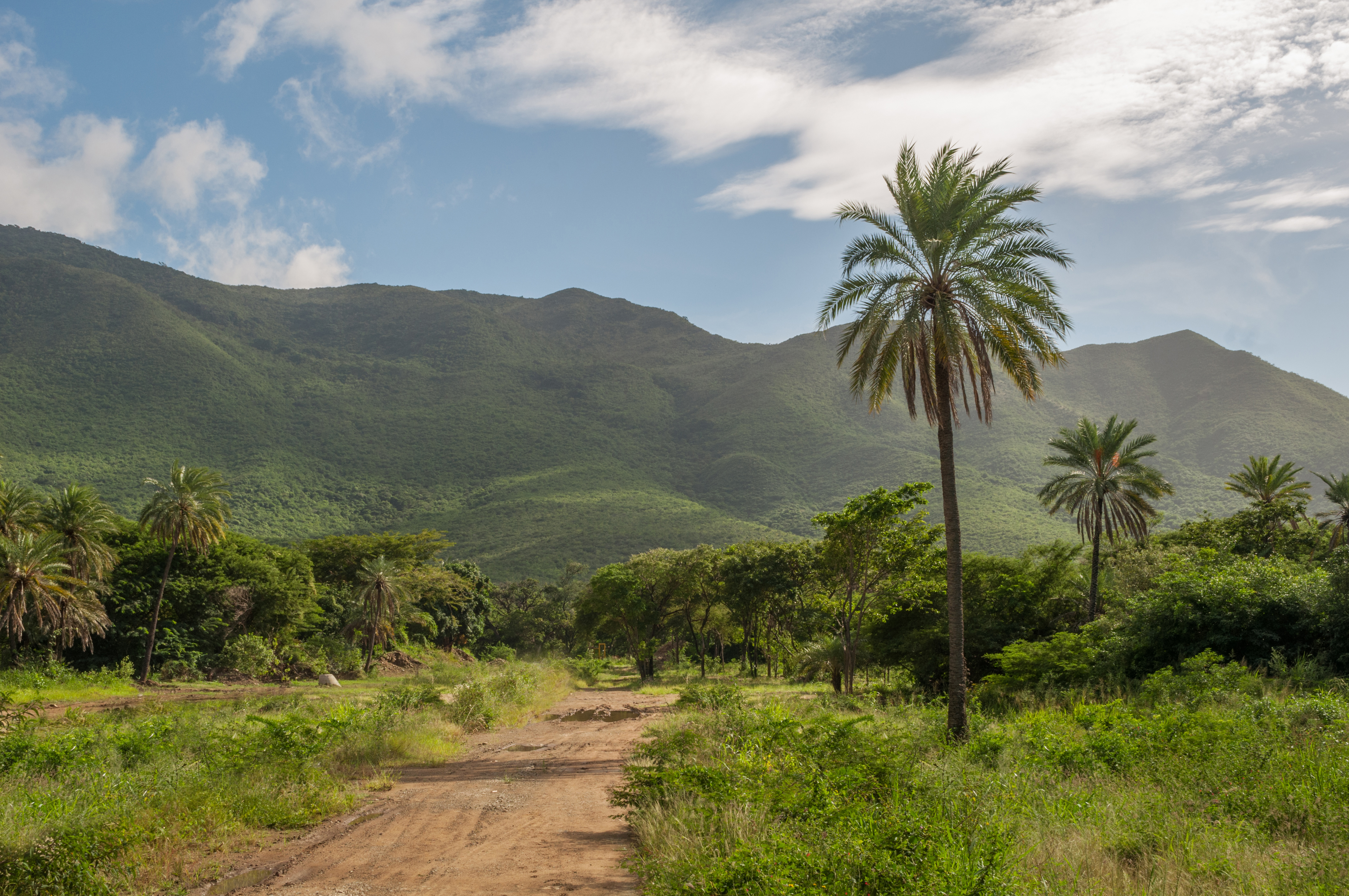

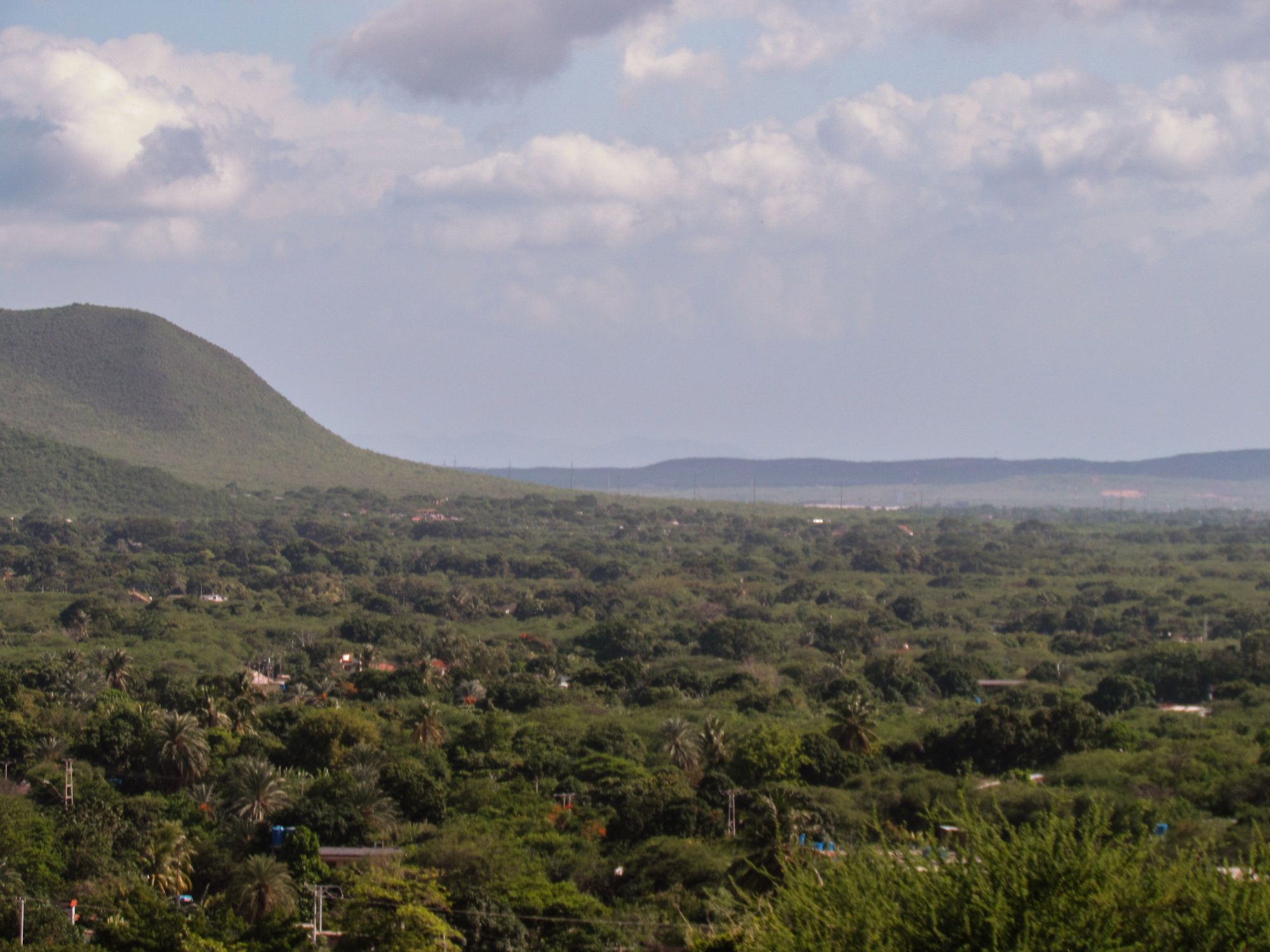

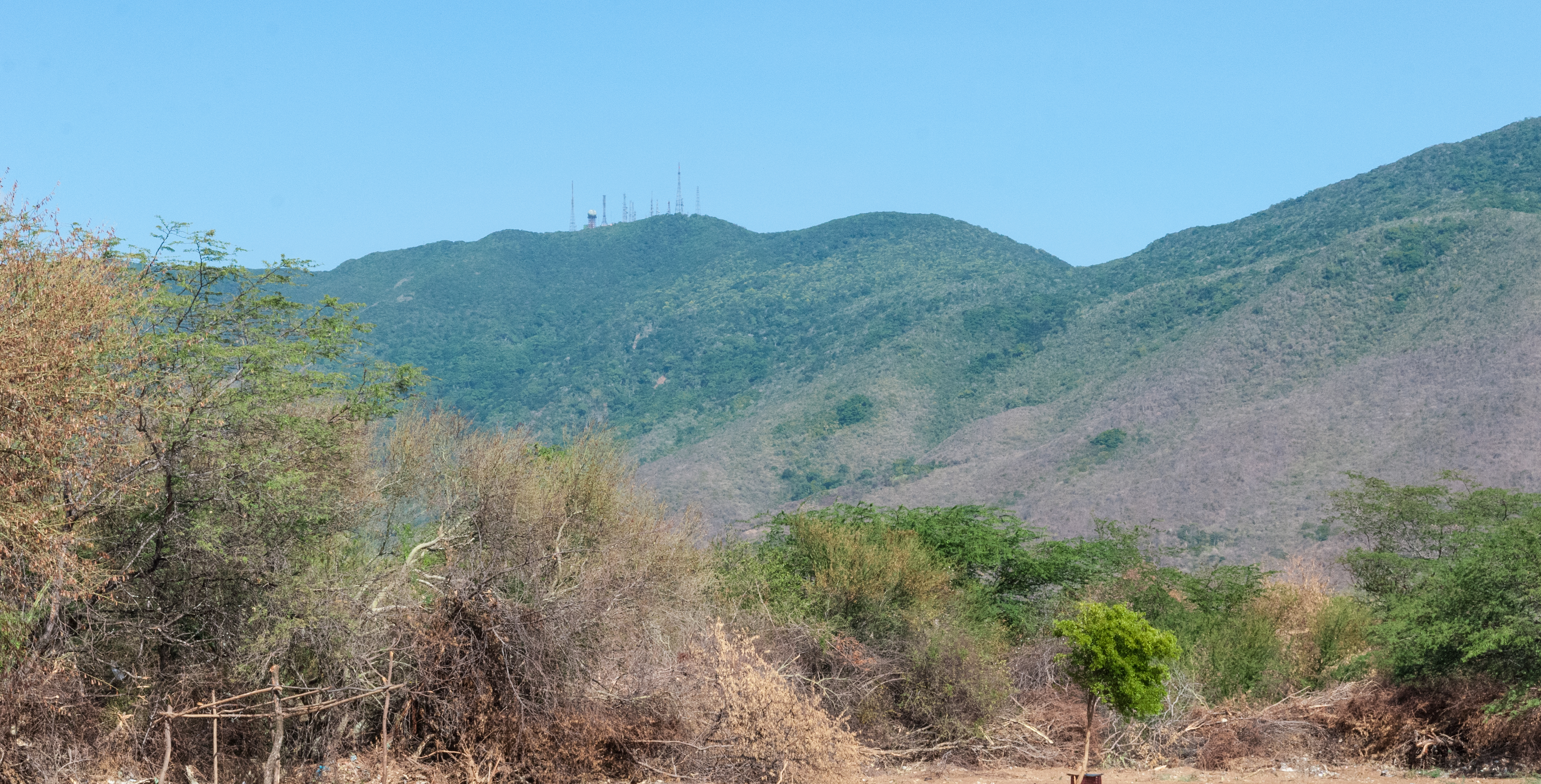

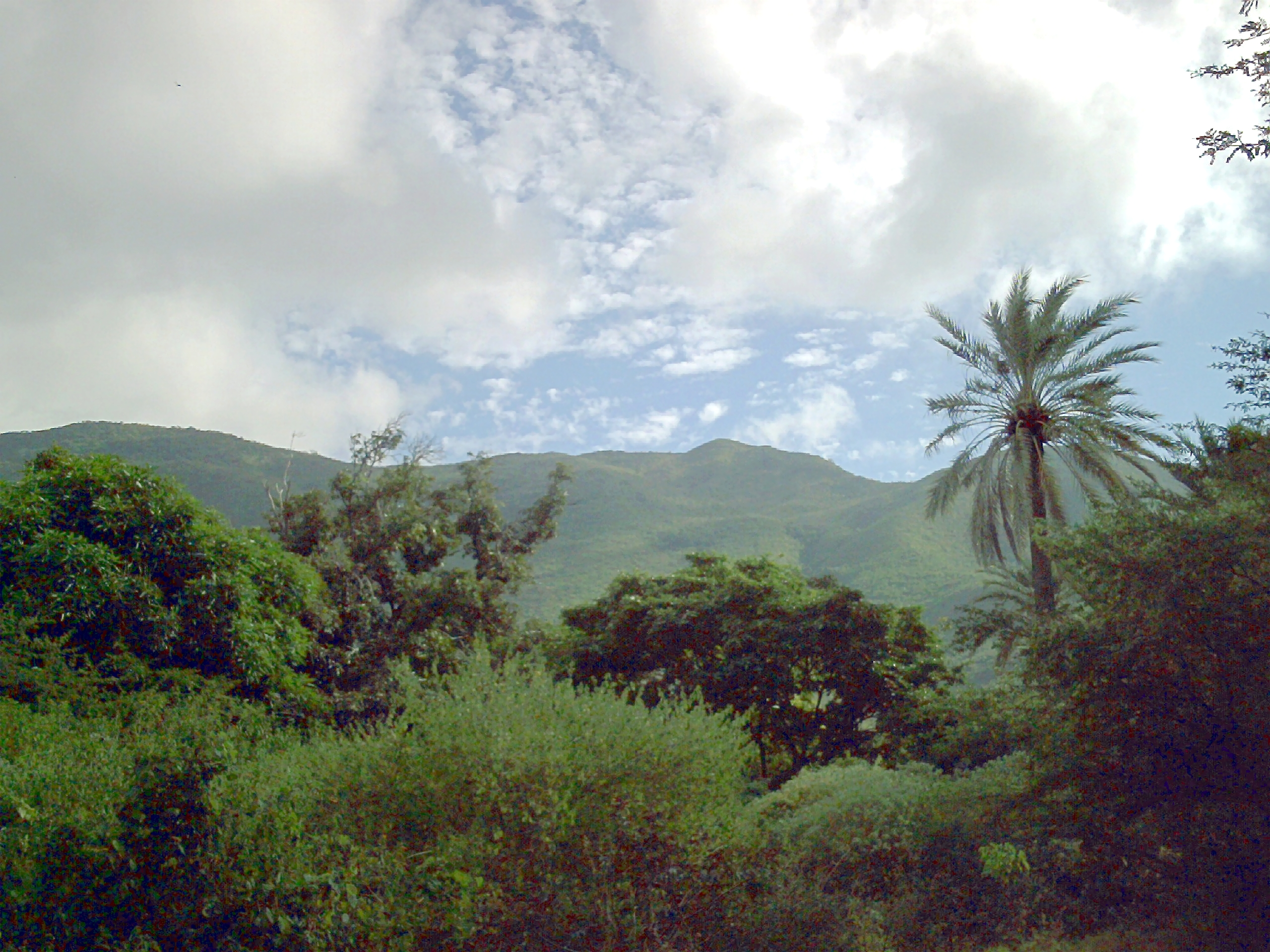

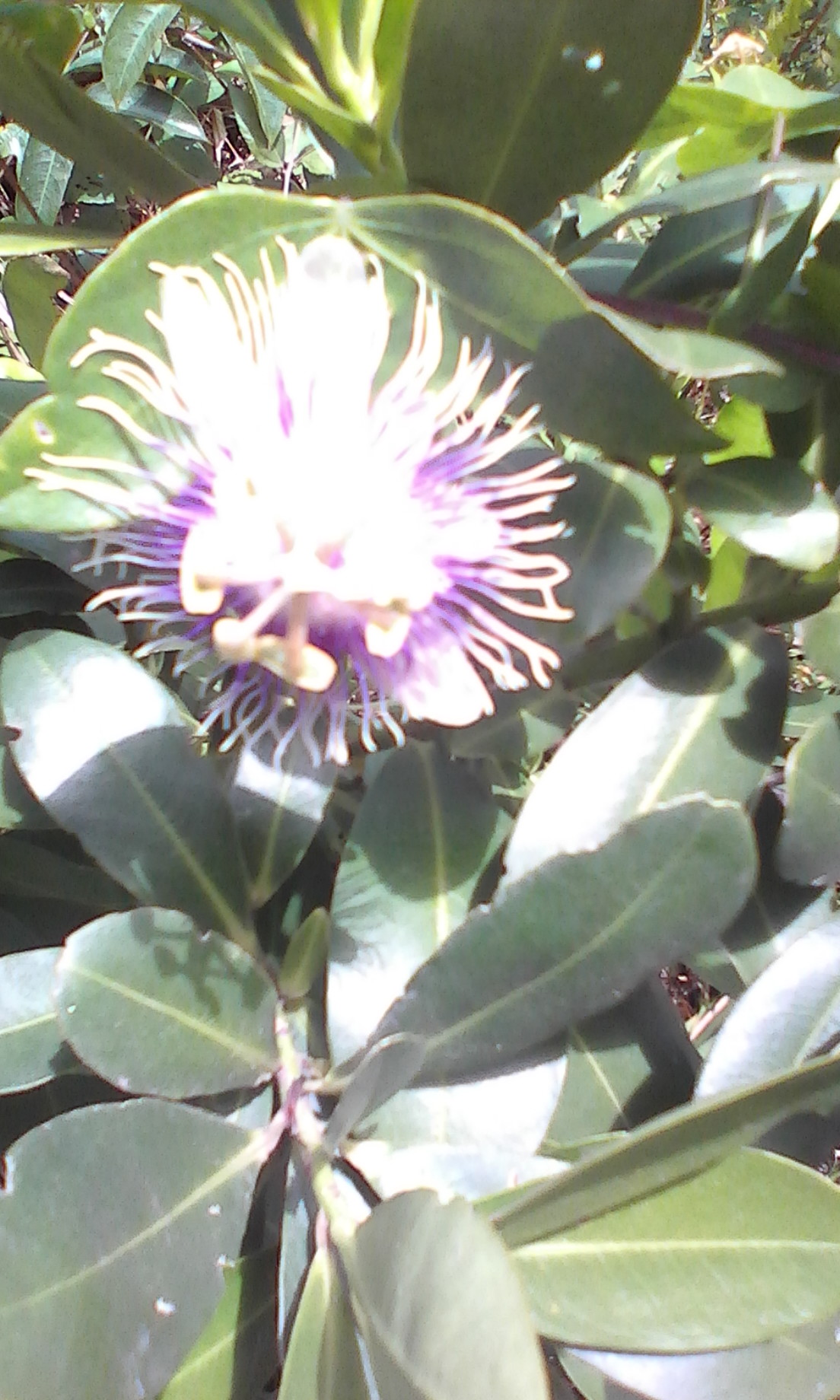

== See also ==
- List of national parks of Venezuela
- Sierra Nevada National Park (Venezuela)
