= Pico San Juan =

Mountain in Cuba

- Location within Cuba

Highest point
- Elevation: 1,140 m (3,740 ft)
- Prominence: 1,107 m (3,632 ft)
- Listing: North America isolated peaks 45th; Ribu; The 14 most isolated major summits of the Caribbean
- Coordinates: 21°59′07″N 80°07′58″W

Naming
- English translation: San Juan Peak
- Language of name: Spanish

Geography
- Location: Cuba
- Parent range: Escambray Mountains

Pico San Juan is the highest point of the central area of the island of Cuba with 1,140 meters above sea level.

== Geography ==
Pico San Juan is located in the municipality of Cumanayagua, in the Cienfuegos Province, and belongs to the Escambray Mountains or "Guamuhaya", the largest mountain range in central Cuba. The mountain rises on a 1,140 meters above sea level of rivers, forests, valleys and peaks.

Originally counting at a height of 1,142 meters above sea level, its last 2 meters were lowered to the current height in the 1980s, with the purpose of installing a meteorological radar that is still in that place. At the top, there is also a bust of the prominent Cuban caver Antonio Núñez Jiménez.

== History ==
The Sierra del Escambray, in the "Guamuhaya" Massif, was the scene of small combats between the Cuban aborigines and the Spanish conquistadors during the 16th century. Later, during the last third of the 19th century, it was a refuge for the Mambises who fought for the independence of Cuba (1868-1898).

Finally, it was also the scene of the armed struggle in the 1950s and 1960s, first of the 26th of July Movement, the Directorio Revolucionario Estudiantil and the Second National Front of Escambray against the army of General Fulgencio Batista (1957-1958), and then, during the Escambray rebellion (1960-1965).
