= Loma Alto de la Bandera =

Mountain in the Dominican Republic

Coordinates: 18.813°N 70.627°W

- Location within the Dominican Republic

Highest point
- Elevation: 2,842 m (9,324 ft)
- Prominence: 1,501 m (4,925 ft)
- Listing: Ultra; Ribu

Loma Alto de la Bandera is a mountain in the Dominican Republic located within Valle Nuevo National Park, which is in the province of La Vega Province. During the United States occupation of the Dominican Republic (1916–24), the mountain was mapped, catalogued, and measured to a height of 9324 ft. (2842 m), with a prominence of 4925 ft. (1501m). Due to the peak's relative proximity to Santo Domingo, the mountaintop is coated with telecommunications towers, including those used for air traffic control at Las Américas International Airport.
