= Pic la Selle =

Mountain in Haiti

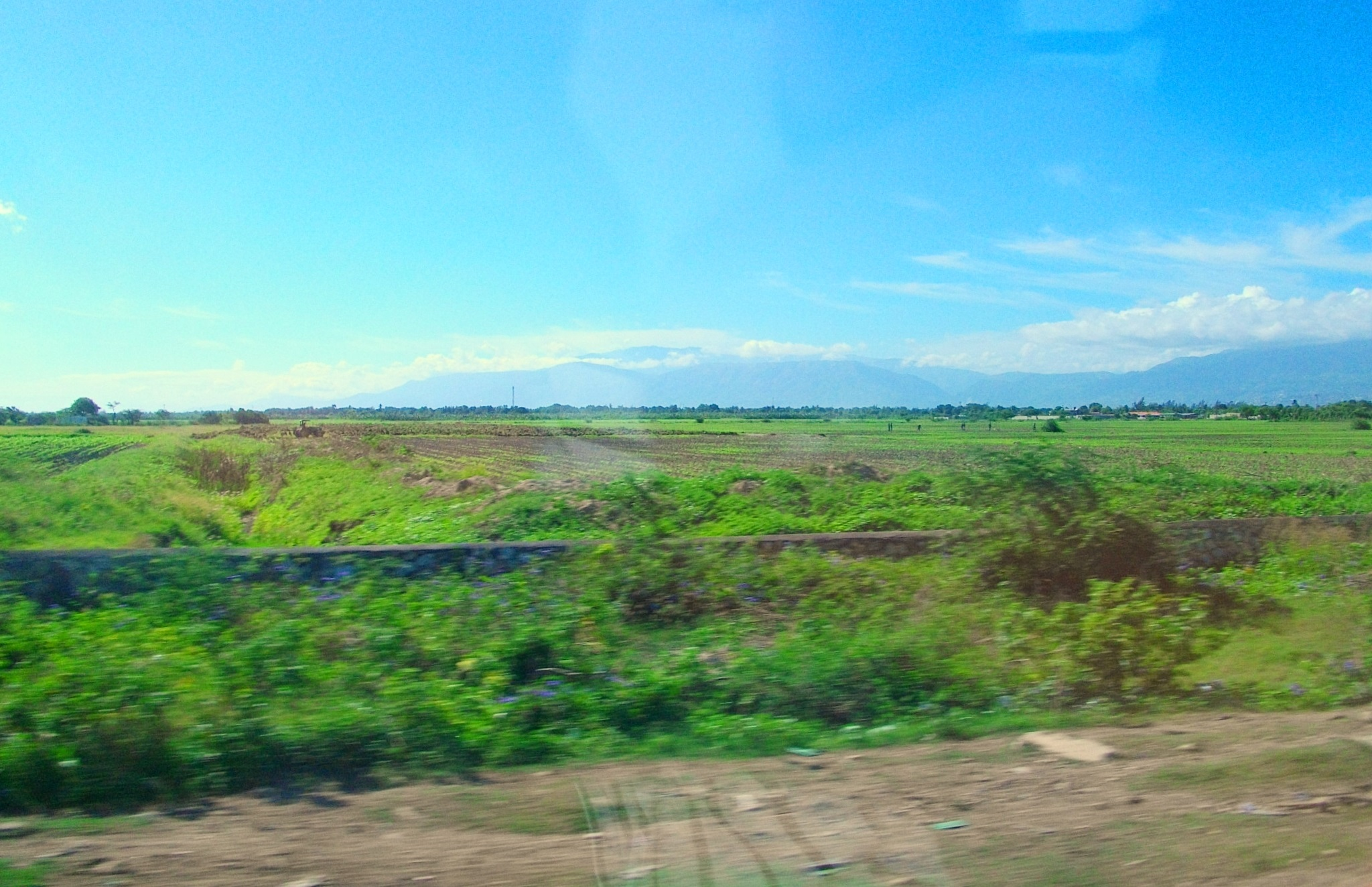
- Pic la Selle, seen from the Cul-de-Sac plain

Highest point
- Elevation: 2,574 m (8,445 ft)
- Listing: North America prominent peak 29th; Country high point; Ultra
- Coordinates: 18°22′N 71°59′W

Geography
- Location within Haiti
- Location: Haiti
- Parent range: Chaîne de la Selle

Pic la Selle (French pronunciation: [pik la sɛl]; Haitian Creole: Pik Lasel), also called Morne La Selle, is the highest peak in Haiti at 2,574 metres (8,445 ft) above sea level. The mountain is part of the Chaîne de la Selle mountain range and has a pine forest. The species black-capped petrel inhabits the mountain. There are no formal trails on the mountain.

== Name ==
The mountain is referred to as both Pic la Selle and Morne La Selle.

== History ==
The U.S. National Geodetic Survey reached the summit of Pic la Selle in 1919. Botanists Erik Leonard Ekman and Alexander Wetmore conducted an expedition to Pic la Selle in 1927.

== Geography ==
Pic la Selle is 2,574 metres (8,445 ft) to 2,679 metres (8,789 ft) in height and is part of the Chaîne de la Selle mountain range. It is the highest point in Haiti. There are 6,845 hectares of land in the mountain above 2,000 metres (6,600 ft).

There were no formal trails on the mountain as of 2019. William Krauss, writing for The New York Times in 1941, noted that most climbers ignored Pic la Selle as it was not high enough for professionals and too inaccessible for others.

== Environment ==
A forest of pine trees is present above the elevation of 1,800 metres (5,900 ft). Celestus macrotus is present on the northeastern slopes of Pic la Selle. A report in the 1930s listed white-winged warblers, and eastern chat-tanagers, and Antillean siskins as being present on the mountain. A breeding colony of black-capped petrel was present in the 1960s and the species still inhabitants the mountain as of 2011.

== Works cited ==
=== Books ===
- Latta, Steven; Rimmer, Christopher; McFarland, Kent (2022). Field Guide to the Birds of the Dominican Republic and Haiti. Princeton University Press. ISBN 9780691232393.
- Seabrook, William (1929). The Magic Island. Harcourt.
- Wetmore, Alexander; Swales, Bradshaw (1931). The Birds of Haiti and the Dominican Republic. Smithsonian Institution.

=== Journals ===
- Thomas, Richard; Hedges, S. (1989). "A New Celestus (Sauria: Anguidae) from the Chaine de la Selle of Haiti". Copeia (4). American Society of Ichthyologists and Herpetologists: 886–891. doi:10.2307/1445973. JSTOR 1445973.
- Wingate, David (1964). "Discovery of Breeding Black-Capped Petrels on Hispaniola". The Auk. 81 (2). American Ornithological Society: 147–159. doi:10.2307/4082765. JSTOR 4082765.

=== News ===
- Donahue, Bill (12 March 2019). "Last year Trump called these countries a profane name. We sent a travel writer to celebrate them". The Washington Post. Archived from the original on 14 March 2019.
- Krauss, William (6 April 1941). "Haiti Peak Challenges; Morne La Selle, With Slopes to Test Any Amateur, Is Easy to Reach, Hard to Climb". The New York Times.

=== Web ===
- "La Selle". Haiti National Trust. Archived from the original on 26 May 2026.
