= Geography of Dominica =

Dominica
Nickname: Nature Isle of the Caribbean
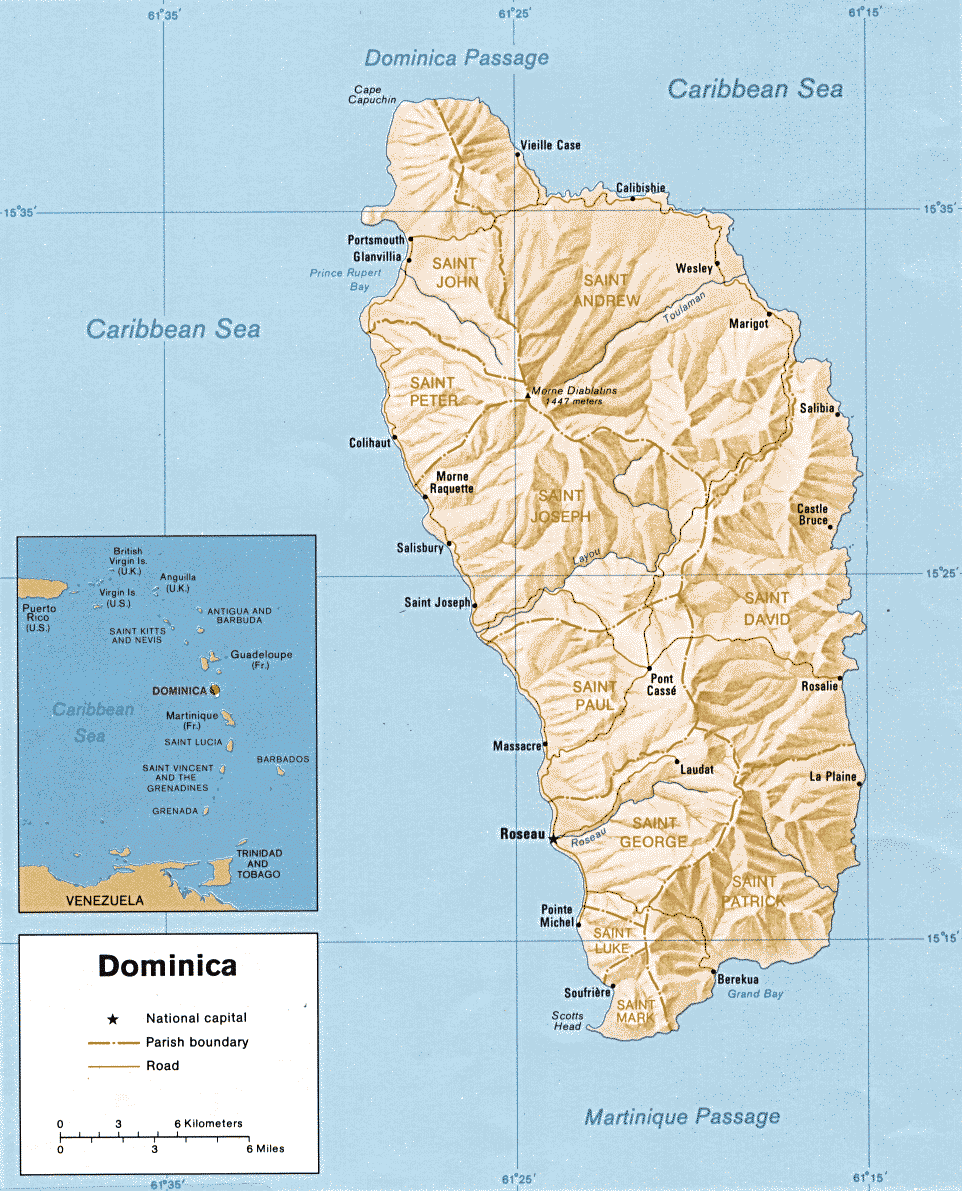
- Map of Dominica

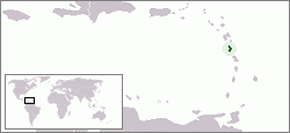

Geography
- Location: Caribbean Sea
- Coordinates: 15°25′N 61°20′W
- Archipelago: Windward Islands
- Area: 751 km^{2} (290 sq mi)
- Length: 47 km (29.2 mi)
- Width: 29 km (18 mi)
- Coastline: 148 km (92 mi)
- Highest elevation: 1,447 m (4747 ft)
- Highest point: Morne Diablotins

Administration
- Dominica
- Largest settlement: Roseau (pop. 14,847)

Demographics
- Population: 71,727 (2003)
- Pop. density: 95.51/km^{2} (247.37/sq mi)
- Ethnic groups: Black 90%, Mulatto, 8 % Carib-Amerindian 2%

Dominica is an island in the Caribbean Sea, located about halfway between the French islands of Guadeloupe (to the north) and Martinique (to the south). Its coordinates are 15 25 N, 61 20 W. It is known as "The Nature Island of the Caribbean" due to its spectacular, lush, and varied flora and fauna, which is protected by an extensive natural park system. It is the fourth largest island in the Eastern Caribbean with a population of people mainly of African descent.

The lowest point in the country is at sea level along the coast, and the highest is Morne Diablotins (1,447 m or 4,747 ft). The extreme southwestern coast of the island includes a large collapsed submarine caldera. Portions of the exposed rim of this caldera form the southwestern tip of the island at Scotts Head. Natural resources include farming, hydropower and timber.

Geographically, Dominica is distinctive in many ways. The country has one of the most rugged landscapes in the Caribbean, covered by a largely unexploited, multi-layered rain forest. It is also among the Earth's most rain-drenched lands, and the water runoff forms cascading rivers and natural pools. The island, home to rare species of wildlife, is considered by many as a beautiful, unspoiled tropical preserve. According to a popular West Indian belief, Dominica is the only New World territory that Columbus would still recognize.

Dominica is the largest and most northerly of the Windward Islands. The island faces the Atlantic Ocean to the east and the Caribbean Sea to the west. Its nearest neighbours are the French islands of Guadeloupe, some 48 kilometres (30 mi) north, and Martinique, about 40 kilometres (25 mi) south. Oblong-shaped and slightly smaller than New York City, Dominica is 750 square kilometres (290 sq mi) in area, 47 kilometres (29 mi) in length, and 29 kilometres (18 mi) in width. Roseau, the nation's capital and major port, is favourably situated on the sheltered, southwestern coast.

== Climate ==
The island's climate is tropical, moderated by northeast trade winds and heavy rainfall.

Dominica has a tropical rainforest climate and some areas bordering on a tropical monsoon climate with characteristically warm temperatures and heavy rainfall. Excessive heat and humidity are tempered somewhat by a steady flow of the northeast trade winds, which periodically develop into hurricanes during the Northern Hemisphere's summer. The steep interior slopes also alter temperatures and winds. Because of the moderating effects of the surrounding ocean, temperature ranges are slight. Average daytime temperatures generally vary from 26 °C (78.8 °F) in January to 32 °C (89.6 °F) in June. Diurnal ranges are usually no greater than 3 °C (5.4 °F) in most places, but temperatures dipping to 13 °C (55.4 °F) on the highest peaks are not uncommon.

Most of the island's ample supply of water is brought by the trade winds. Although amounts vary with the location, rain is possible throughout the year, with the greatest monthly totals recorded from June through October. Average yearly rainfall along the windward east coast frequently exceeds 5,000 mm (196.9 in), and exposed mountainsides receive up to 9,000 mm (354.3 in), among the highest accumulations in the world. Totals on the leeward west coast, however, are only about 1,800 mm (70.9 in) per year. Humidities are closely tied to rainfall patterns, with the highest values occurring on windward slopes and the lowest in sheltered areas. Relative humidity readings between 70 percent and 90 percent have been recorded in Roseau.

Hurricanes and severe winds, most likely to occur during the wettest months, occasionally are devastating. The most recent hurricane of note was the devastating Hurricane Maria in 2017. On August 17, 2007, Hurricane Dean, a Category 1 at the time, hit the island. A mother and her seven-year-old son died when a landslide caused by the heavy rains fell onto their house. In another incident two people were injured when a tree fell on their house. Prime Minister Roosevelt Skerrit estimated that 100 to 125 homes were damaged, and that the agriculture sector was extensively damaged, in particular the banana crop. Before that were David and Frederic in August 1979 and Allen in August 1980. The 1979 hurricanes caused over 40 deaths, 2,500 injuries, and extensive destruction of housing and crops. Many agricultural commodities were destroyed during the 1980 storm, and about 25 percent of the banana crop was destroyed by strong winds in 1984.

Below is the climate data for Roseau, the capital city located on the western side of Dominica partially shielded from the trade winds by the mountains.

Climate data for Roseau
Month	Jan	Feb	Mar	Apr	May	Jun	Jul	Aug	Sep	Oct	Nov	Dec	Year
Record high °C (°F)	33 (91)	34 (93)	36 (97)	36 (97)	36 (97)	36 (97)	35 (95)	35 (95)	35 (95)	37 (99)	35 (95)	34 (93)	37 (99)
Mean daily maximum °C (°F)	28.0 (82.4)	28.0 (82.4)	28.4 (83.1)	29.1 (84.4)	29.6 (85.3)	30.1 (86.2)	30.2 (86.4)	30.5 (86.9)	30.4 (86.7)	29.0 (84.2)	29.6 (85.3)	28.6 (83.5)	29.3 (84.7)
Daily mean °C (°F)	24.9 (76.8)	24.8 (76.6)	25.1 (77.2)	25.8 (78.4)	26.6 (79.9)	27.3 (81.1)	27.4 (81.3)	27.4 (81.3)	27.1 (80.8)	26.1 (79.0)	26.2 (79.2)	25.4 (77.7)	26.2 (79.2)
Mean daily minimum °C (°F)	21.8 (71.2)	21.6 (70.9)	21.8 (71.2)	22.5 (72.5)	23.7 (74.7)	24.5 (76.1)	24.6 (76.3)	24.3 (75.7)	23.8 (74.8)	23.2 (73.8)	22.8 (73.0)	22.2 (72.0)	23.1 (73.6)
Record low °C (°F)	16 (61)	16 (61)	16 (61)	17 (63)	18 (64)	20 (68)	18 (64)	19 (66)	18 (64)	18 (64)	18 (64)	17 (63)	16 (61)
Average precipitation mm (inches)	159 (6.3)	107 (4.2)	135 (5.3)	122 (4.8)	220 (8.7)	162 (6.4)	181 (7.1)	243 (9.6)	298 (11.7)	334 (13.1)	374 (14.7)	240 (9.4)	2,575 (101.4)
Average relative humidity (%)	71	68	65	64	64	67	72	73	71	73	74	72	70
Mean monthly sunshine hours	198.9	200.6	227.3	244.9	243.2	227.7	231.2	240.4	212.2	219.5	194.0	189.5	2,629.4
Source 1: NOAA
Source 2: BBC Weather

== Bays ==
Bays are as follows from the northern tip of the island in a clockwise direction:

Agoucha Bay, Sandwich Bay, Grand Baptiste Bay, Petit Baptiste Bay, La Taille Bay, Rough Bay, Marigot Bay, Walker's Rest Bay, Sophia Bay, Londonderry Bay, Mango Hole Bay, Middle Bay, Panto Hole Bay, Petite Soufriere Bay, Soufriere Bay, Woodbridge Bay, Prince Rupert Bay, Douglas Bay.

== Geology ==
Dominica was the last island to be formed in the Caribbean. The island was created by volcanic action about 26 million years ago. It lies upon two opposing tectonic plates. This explains why an island a bit bigger than Martha's Vineyard has mountains approaching 5,000 feet (1,524 m).

Geologically, Dominica is part of the rugged Lesser Antilles volcanic arc. The country's central spine, a northwest–southeast axis of steep volcanic slopes and deep gorges, generally varies in elevation from 300 to 1,400 metres (984 to 4,593 ft) above sea level. Several east-west trending mountain spurs extend to the narrow coastal plain, which is studded with sea cliffs and has level stretches no wider than 2,000 metres (6,562 ft). The highest peak is Morne Diablotins, at 1,447 metres (4,747 ft); Morne Trois Pitons, with an elevation of 1,423 metres (4,669 ft), lies farther south and is the site of the national park.

The interior features rugged mountains of volcanic origin. Volcanism is still quite evident on the island, the most popular examples being Dominica's Boiling Lake, the second largest of its kind and which rests in a dormant volcanic caldera that last erupted in 1880. The area that exploded on 4 January 1880 was reported to be "fully nine square miles".

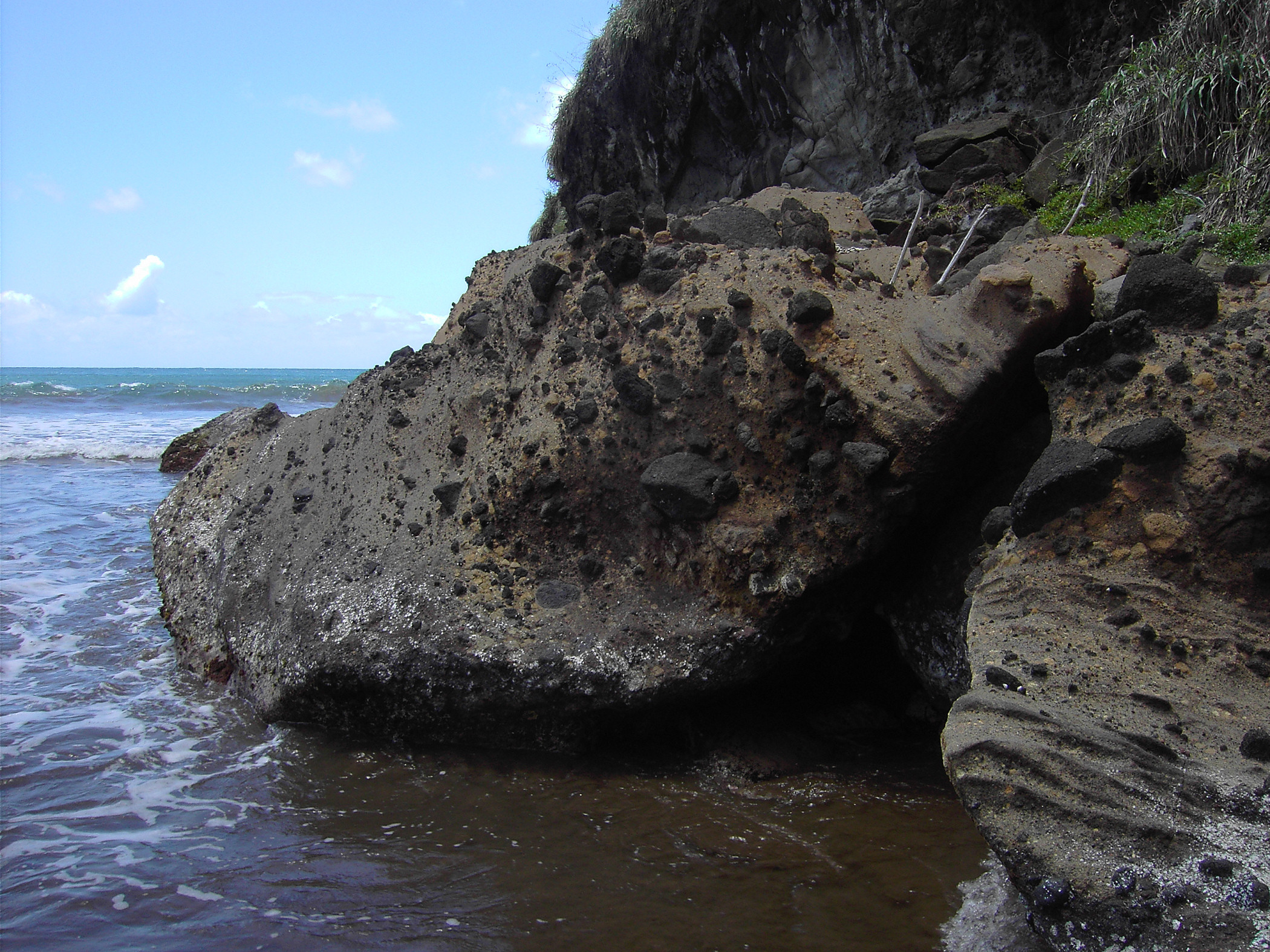
Volcanic rock at Pagua Bay, Dominica

Dominica's rugged surface is marked by its volcanic past. Rock formations are mainly volcanic andesite and rhyolite, with fallen boulders and sharp-edged protrusions peppering slope bases. The light- to dark-hued clay and sandy soils, derived from the rocks and decomposed vegetation, are generally fertile and porous. Only a few interior valleys and coastal strips are flat enough for soil accumulations of consequence, however. Although scores of mostly mild seismic shocks were recorded in 1986, volcanic eruptions ceased thousands of years ago. Sulfuric springs and steam vents, largely concentrated in the central and southern parts of the island, remain active, however.

Dominica is water-rich with swift-flowing highland streams, which cascade into deep gorges and form natural pools and crater lakes. The streams are not navigable, but many are sources of hydroelectric power. Trafalgar Falls, located near the national park, is one of the most spectacular sites on the island. The falls consists of twin waterfalls known as the mother and father or the Mama and the Papa.

== Fauna ==
There are 172 species of birds, including four species of hummingbird, broad-winged hawks, yellow-crowned night herons, and the brown trembler. Some plants and animals thought to be extinct on surrounding islands can still be found in Dominica's forests.

The sisserou parrot is Dominica's national bird and is indigenous to its mountain forests.

The Caribbean Sea offshore of the island of Dominica is home to many cetaceans. Most notably a small group of sperm whales live in this area year round. These are shy animals, but there is a good chance of seeing them if you go out on a calm day. Other cetaceans commonly seen in the area include pilot whale, Fraser's dolphin, pantropical spotted dolphin and bottlenose dolphin. Less commonly seen animals include Cuvier's beaked whale, false killer whale, pygmy sperm whale, dwarf sperm whale, Risso's dolphin, common dolphin, humpback whale and Bryde's whale. This makes Dominica a destination for tourists interested in whale-watching.

== Forests ==
=== REDD+ reference levels and monitoring ===
Under the UNFCCC REDD+ framework, Dominica has submitted national forest reference level benchmarks. On the UNFCCC REDD+ Web Platform, the country’s 2022 submission is listed as having an assessed reference level of −446,983 t CO2 eq per year, while a second submission made in 2024 is listed as under technical assessment. For both submission packages, the other Warsaw Framework elements—a national strategy, safeguards, and a national forest monitoring system—are listed as “not reported”.

The first assessed submission, technically assessed in 2024, covered the REDD+ activities “conservation of forest carbon stocks”, “sustainable management of forests” and “enhancement of forest carbon stocks” at national scale. Using a historical reference period of 2001–2017, the assessed forest reference level for 2018–2025 was defined as the annual average of expected net removals from post-disturbance forest regrowth on forest land remaining forest land, together with removals from land converted to forest land. The technical assessment reported that the benchmark was revised during the assessment process from −648,028 to −446,983 t CO2 eq per year, and that this reflected recalculations associated with forest damage from Hurricane Maria in 2017 and the expected pattern of forest recovery thereafter.

The technical assessment states that the reference level included above-ground biomass, below-ground biomass, dead organic matter and soil organic carbon, and reported CO2, methane (CH_{4}) and nitrous oxide (N_{2}O). However, because biomass burning was not observed or estimated during the historical reference period, only CO2 was effectively quantified in the benchmark.

== Statistics ==
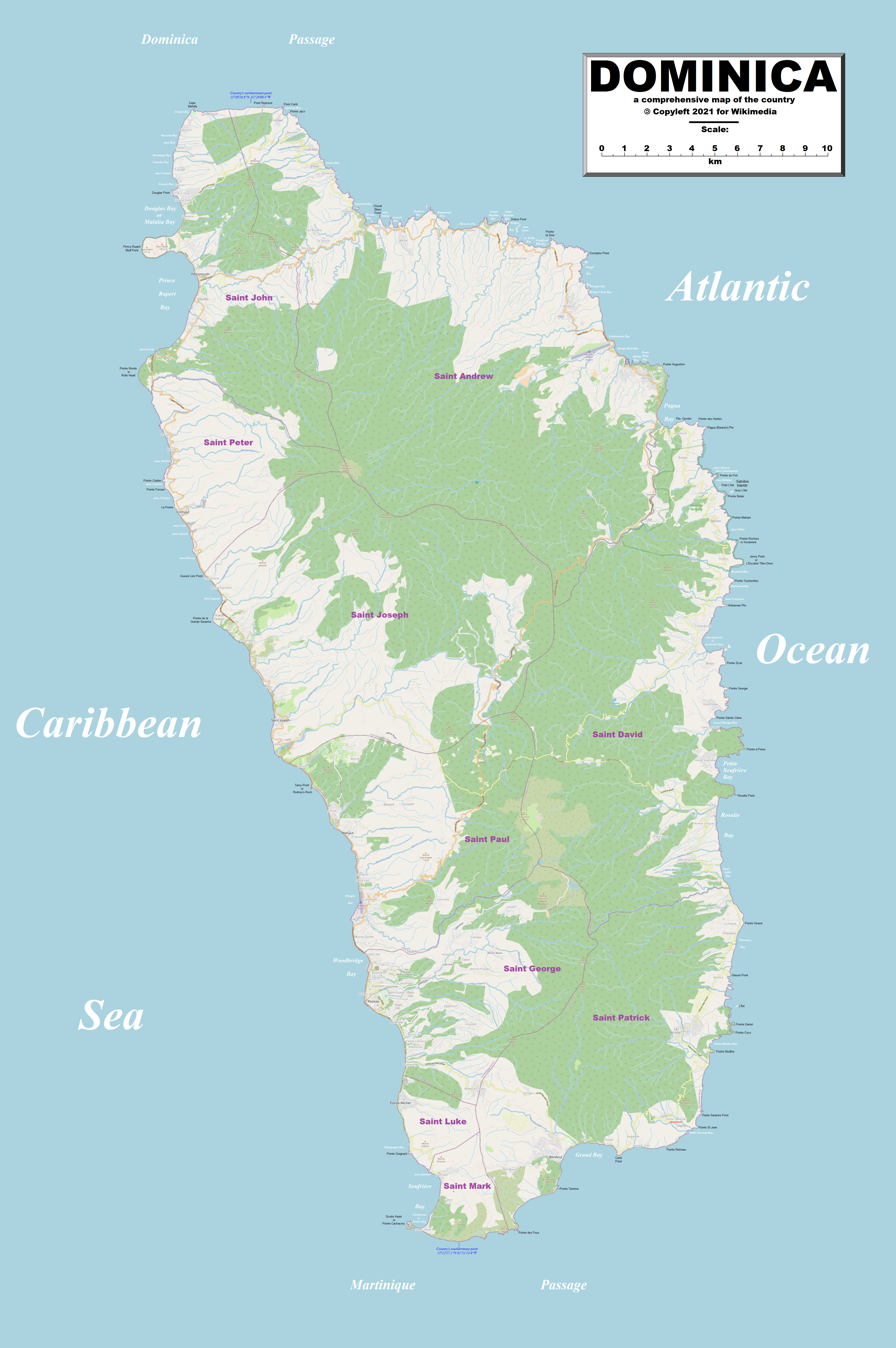
Enlargeable, detailed map of Dominica

Map references: Central America and the Caribbean

Area:
total: [[1 E8 m^{2}|751 km^{2}]]
land: 751 km^{2}

Coastline: 148 km

Maritime claims:
territorial sea: 12 nmi (22.2 km; 13.8 mi)
contiguous zone: 24 nmi (44.4 km; 27.6 mi)
exclusive economic zone: 200 nmi (370.4 km; 230.2 mi)

Land use:
arable land: 8%
permanent crops: 24%
other: 68% (2012 est.)

Irrigated land: NA km^{2}

Freshwater withdrawal (domestic/industrial/agricultural):
total: 0.02 km^{3}/a
per capita: 244.1 m^{3}/a (2004)

Natural hazards: Flash floods are a constant threat; destructive hurricanes can be expected during the late summer months

Environment - international agreements:
Party to: Biodiversity, Climate Change, Desertification, Endangered Species, Environmental Modification, Hazardous Wastes, Law of the Sea, Ozone Layer Protection, Ship Pollution, Whaling

=== Extreme points ===
- Southernmost point – Coast southeast of Scotts Head, Saint Mark Parish
- Westernmost point – Pointe Ronde, Saint John Parish
- Easternmost point – Pointe à Peine, Saint David Parish
- Highest point – Morne Diablotins: 1,447 m
- Lowest point – Caribbean Sea: 0 m
