= Mount Gimie =

Mountain in Saint Lucia

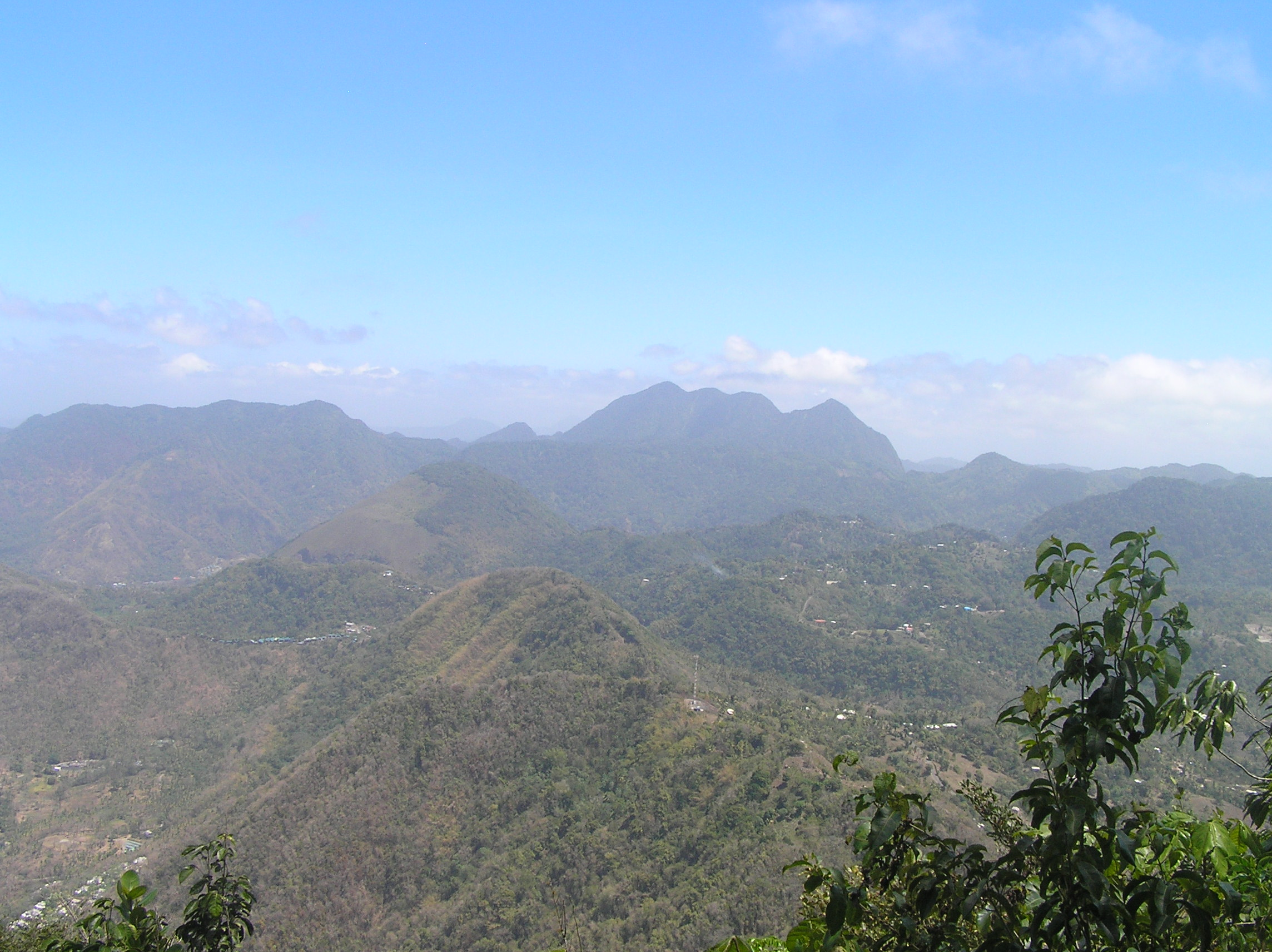
- Mount Gimie as seen from Gros Piton

Highest point
- Elevation: 950 m (3,120 ft)
- Prominence: 950 m (3,120 ft)
- Listing: Country high point
- Coordinates: 13°51′48″N 61°00′40″W

Geography
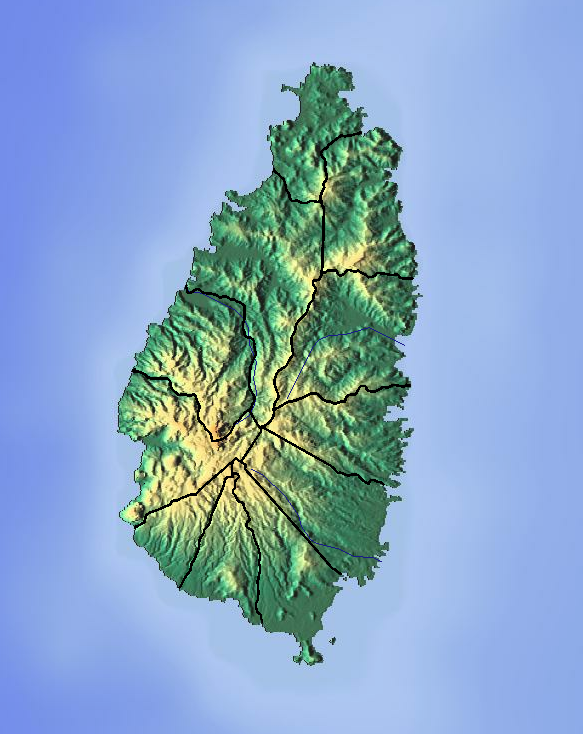
- Location within Saint Lucia
- Location: Canaries District, Saint Lucia

Mount Gimie is the tallest mountain on the island of Saint Lucia. It is located in the Canaries District on the west side of Saint Lucia. The mountain's peak reaches 950 m (3,120 ft). It is covered by lush tropical rainforest and was formed as the result of intense volcanic activity 200,000 to 300,000 years ago. Mount Gimie is still volcanic and so are many other of the Pitons (a couple of volcanic plugs in which Mount Gimie belongs).
