= Araya and Paria xeric scrub =

Ecoregion in Venezuela

Araya and Paria xeric scrub (NT1301)
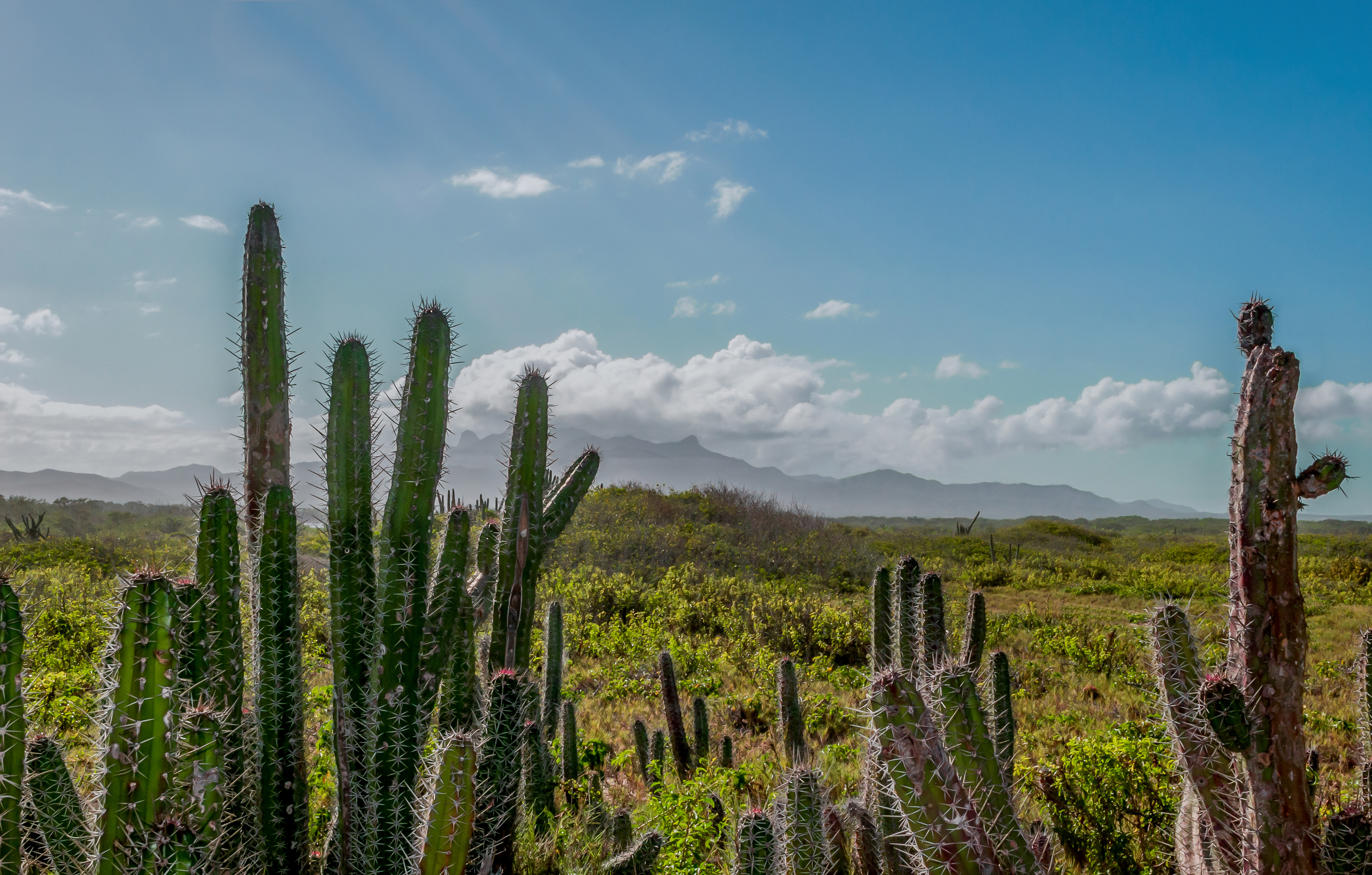
- Stenocereus heptagonus on the Macanao Peninsula of Margarita Island

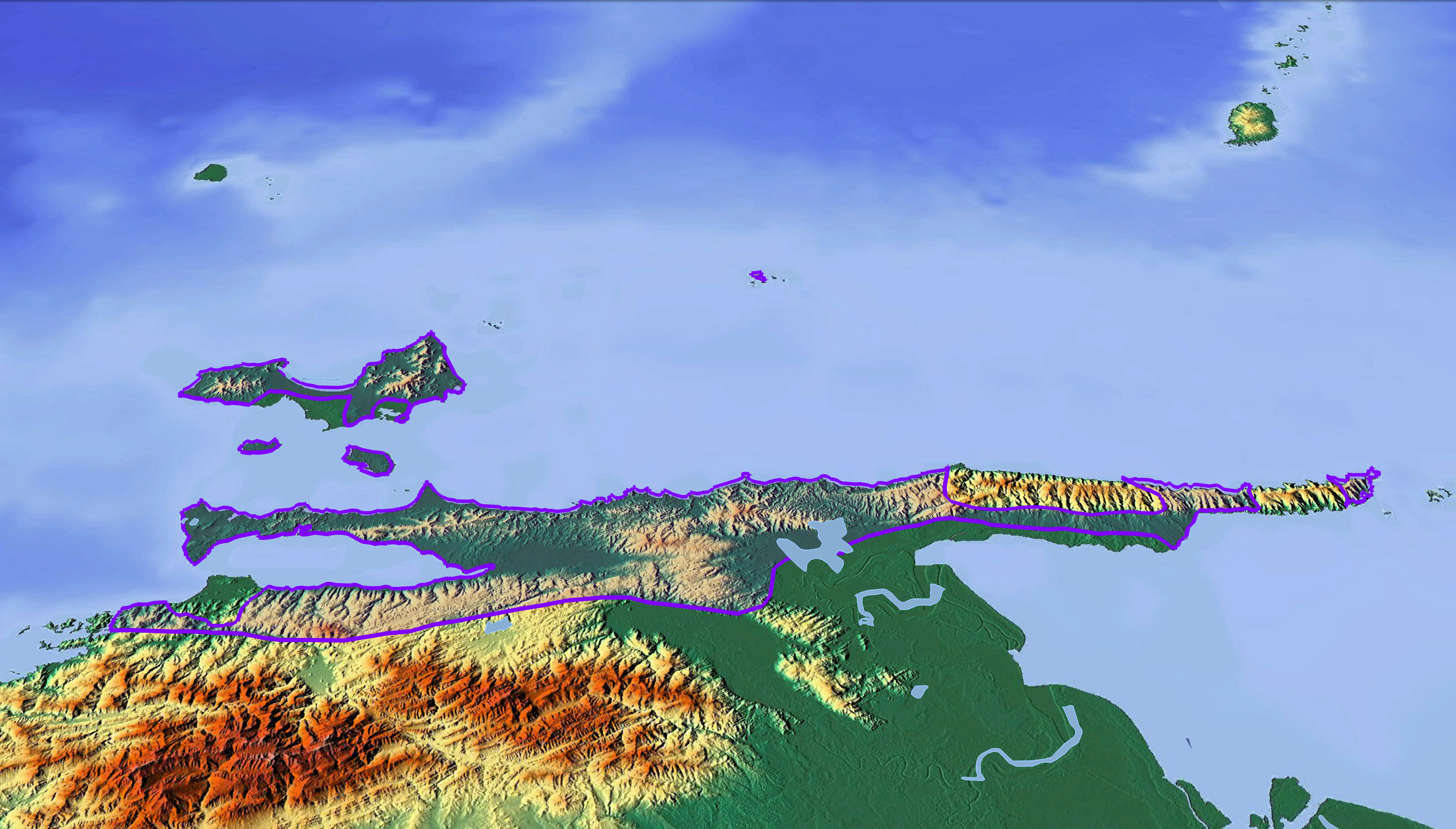
- Ecoregion territory (in magenta)

Ecology
- Realm: Neotropical
- Biome: Deserts and xeric shrublands

Geography
- Area: 5,180 km^{2} (2,000 sq mi)
- Country: Venezuela
- Coordinates: 10.544°N 63.258°W

The Araya and Paria xeric scrub (NT1301) is an ecoregion in Venezuela that stretches along the Caribbean coast to the west of Trinidad, and that includes Margarita Island and some smaller islands. The ecoregion includes dune herbs, dry thorn scrubs and deciduous forests. The mountains on Margarita Island hold montane forests similar to those in the mainland coastal range. The beaches are used for breeding by sea turtles. Some endemic bird species are threatened with extinction by illegal capture for the pet trade. Deforestation and over-grazing by goats are also problems.

== Geography ==
=== Location ===
The west of the ecoregion covers the Araya Peninsula and the coastal area around Cumaná to the south of the peninsula. The ecoregion covers the coastal area to the east of the Araya Peninsula, and extends over parts of the Paria Peninsula. It excludes two mountain areas of the Paria peninsula, which are in the Cordillera de la Costa montane forests ecoregion. To the north it includes the Margarita, Cubagua and Coche islands in the Caribbean. It has an area of 517,997 hectares (1,280,000 acres).

Parts of the coast of the mainland and Margarita Island are lined with Amazon-Orinoco-Southern Caribbean mangroves. To the south the Araya and Paria xeric scrub transitions into La Costa xeric shrublands. The most northern arm of the Orinoco Delta swamp forests reaches the ecoregion in the east.

=== Terrain ===
The region is part of the Venezuelan Coastal Range, formed during the Tertiary period. The rocks are mostly schist and gneisses, in some places underlain by granites. The soils are mostly entisols and ultisols.

The 934 square kilometres (361 sq mi) Margarita Island is 38 kilometres (24 mi) north of the Araya Peninsula. The larger, eastern part of the island is mountainous, with peaks that rise to the 910 metres (2,990 ft) Cerro El Copey. The center of the island forms a coastal plain with sandy beaches and areas of dunes. This is connected by an isthmus to the western part, the Macanao Peninsula, which contains a line of mountains of which the 740 metres (2,430 ft) Cerro Macanao is the highest.

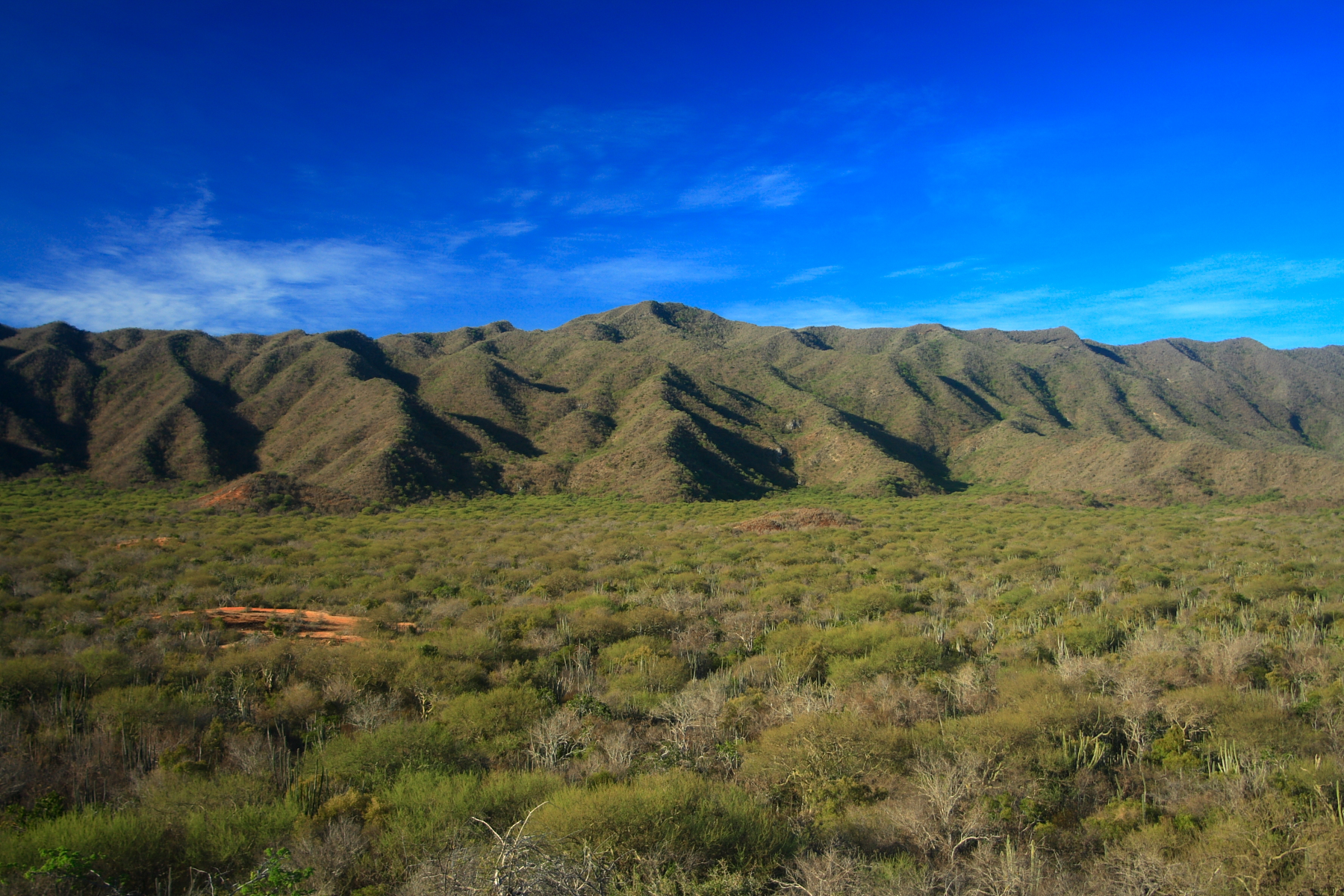
Interior of the Araya Peninsula

The rocky northern coast of the Araya-Paria Peninsula extends for 370 kilometres (230 mi) from west to east. The west of the Araya Peninsula holds the Salina de Araya, a sandy plain that is often flooded by the sea. From here a line of hills extends to the east, with their highest point formed by the 1,104 metres (3,622 ft) Cerro San José. East of the hills there is a region of low country that extends to the mountainous area of the Paria Peninsula. The Araya-Paria Peninsula is joined to the mainland by the Cariaco-Yaguaraparo isthmus. The ecoregion extends along the mainland coast over lower mountains to the Cumaná region.

=== Climate ===
The climate varies considerably in different parts of the ecoregion. The Araya Peninsula is extremely dry, with annual rainfall of 200–300 millimetres (7.9–11.8 in), with more rain towards the end of the year. On the Paria Peninsula annual rainfall is 900–2,000 millimetres (35–79 in), falling throughout the year, with less rain on the coast. In the coastal region from the center of the Araya-Paria Peninsula to Cumaná there are wet seasons from June to August, and around year end. Rainfall is from 375 millimetres (14.8 in) in the west to 900 millimetres (35 in) in the east.

At Carúpano, mid-way along the Araya-Paria Peninsula the Köppen climate classification is "Aw": equatorial, winter dry. At this location the mean monthly temperature varies from 24.2 °C (75.6 °F) in January to 26.6 °C (79.9 °F) in September. Total annual rainfall is about 880 millimetres (35 in). Monthly rainfall varies from 19.8 millimetres (0.78 in) in March to 121.3 millimetres (4.78 in) in July. Margarita Island also has wet seasons from June to August, and around year end. On Margarita Island rainfall is from 250 millimetres (9.8 in) in the plain to 1,000 millimetres (39 in) in the mountains. Temperatures average 26–27 °C (79–81 °F), but may be higher in the arid lowlands and lower in the mountains.

== Ecology ==
The ecoregion is in the neotropical realm, in the deserts and xeric shrublands biome.

=== Flora ===
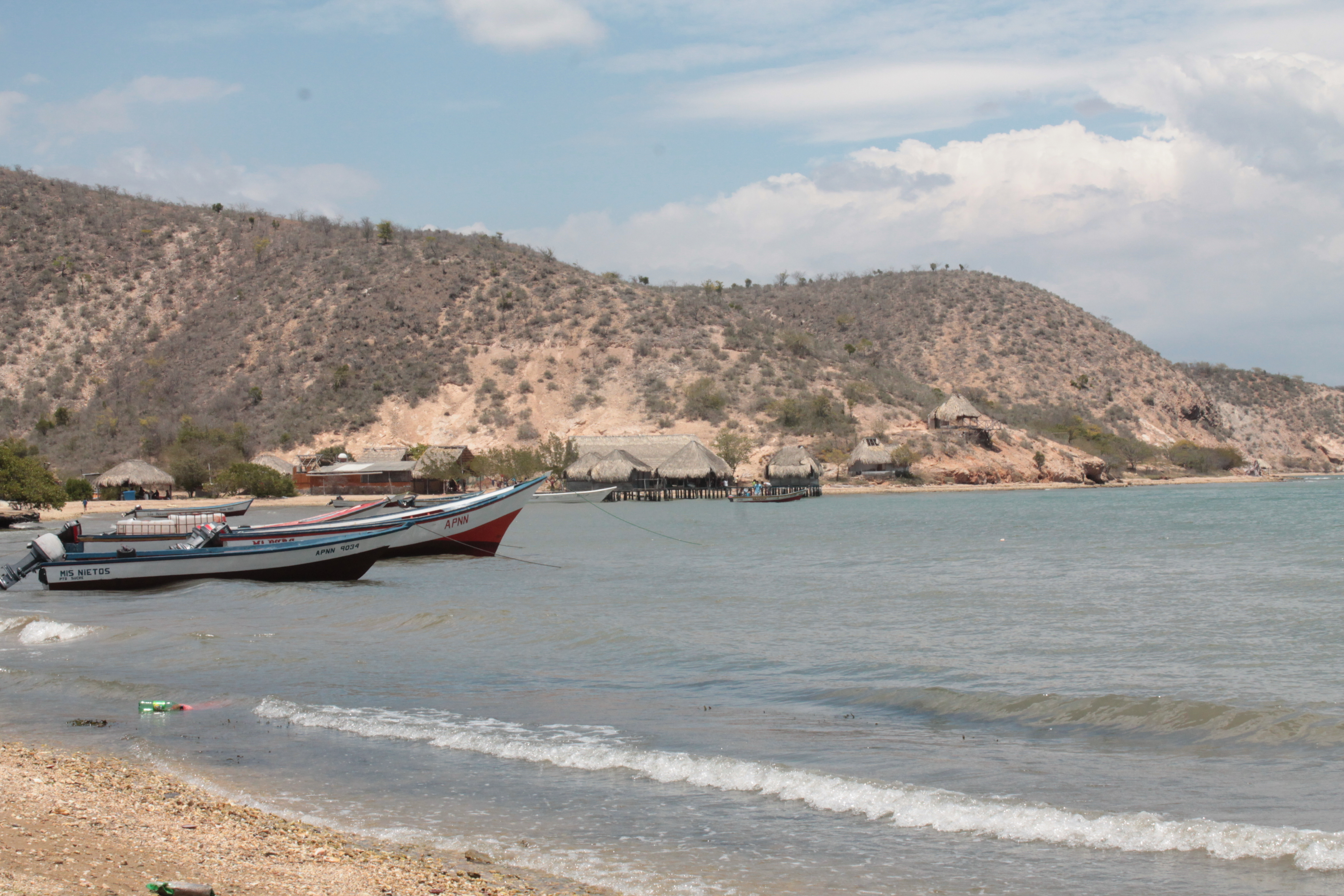
Chacopatica on the north coast of the eastern Araya Peninsula

Paria has a patchwork of bamboo forests and scrub. The coast is lined with coconut palms, mangroves, fishing villages and resorts. The interior holds scrub, deciduous thorn woods, pastures and agricultural fields. The coastal range of the ecoregion has areas of salt-tolerant coastal herbs, areas of coastal dune herbs, and areas of coastal dry thorn scrubs. Open communities of short salt-tolerant herbs are found in depressions that are often flooded by the sea, including species such as Atriplex pentandra, Batis maritima, Heterostachys ritteriana, Salicornia fruticosa and Sesuvium portulacastrum. Low open to dense communities of herb cover sandy dunes with species such as Cakile lanceolata, Cyperus planifolius, Euphorbia buxifolia, Ipomoea pes-caprae, Portulaca pilosa, Scaevola plumieri and Sporobolus virginicus.

The coastal dry thorn scrubs grow on rocky/sandy land from 50–100 metres (160–330 ft) above the beaches, and contain open to very closed communities of 0.5–5 metres (1 ft 8 in – 16 ft 5 in) plants such as columnar cacti and spiny shrubs armed with thorns, spines, and prickles. Typical plants are Prosopis and Parkinsonia species, Bourreria cumanensis, Opuntia caribaea and Stenocereus griseus. On the mainland and Paria Peninsula the low deciduous forests have middle density and well-developed understoreys. Common species around the mainland Turimiquire massif include Bauhinia aculeata, Bourreria cumanensis, Bursera simaruba, Pereskia guamacho and Tabebuia billbergii. Common species on the Paria Peninsula are Cynophalla hastata, Diospyros inconstans, Jacquinia revoluta and Maytenus sieberiana.

Plants of the Cerro Copey range on Margarita Island closely resemble those of the Cordillera de la Costa montane forest. Forests from 10–25 metres (33–82 ft) high are found between 200 metres (660 ft) and 500–600 metres (1,600–2,000 ft) above sea level. Common species include Aspidosperma vargasii, Bursera simaruba, Clusia rosea, Coccoloba coronata, Croton xanthochloros, Machaerium robiniifolium, Maytenus karstenii, Neea anisophylla, Tabebuia billbergii, and Ximenia americana. Forests from 10–20 metres (33–66 ft) grow from 500 metres (1,600 ft) to 750–800 metres (2,460–2,620 ft) with low-to-mid density, a thick understory and many palms and epiphytes. Common species include Bactris setulosa, Dendropanax arboreus, Euterpe precatoria, Guapira ofersiana, Inga macrantha, Margaritaria nobilis, Myrcianthes compressa, Nectandra coriacea and Tabebuia chrysantha. Above 750 metres (2,460 ft) there is montane evergreen shrub from 1–3 metres (3 ft 3 in – 9 ft 10 in) high with low shrubby-herbaceous vegetation such as Blakea monticola, Clusia flavia, Clidemia hirta, Glomeropitcairnia erectiflora, Macleania nitida and Myrsine guianensis. Endemic flora in the Cerro Copey range include Argythamnia erubescens, Blakea monticola, Clerodendrum margaritense, Croton margaritensis, Inga macrantha and Mikania johnstonii.

=== Fauna ===
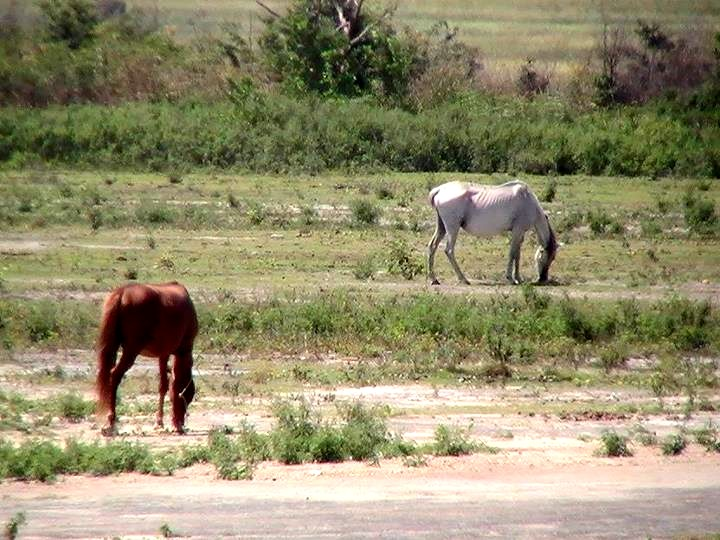
Horses near Casanay

The Macanao Peninsula and the westernmost part of the Araya Peninsula are important areas for threatened neotropical birds, particularly the yellow-shouldered amazon (Amazona barbadensis), which is in demand for the pet trade. The subspecies Margarita blue-crowned parakeet (Thectocercus acuticaudatus neoxena) found in the mangroves around the La Restinga lagoon, is also threatened by pet trade. The lagoon complex around Cumaná, the Golf of Cariaco salina and the Araya peninsula lagoons provide refuges to many species of birds. The Chacopata Lagoon has the largest pelican colony in Venezuela, and is used by large groups of flamingos. Beaches on Margarita are used for breeding by the loggerhead sea turtle (Caretta caretta) and green sea turtle (Chelonia mydas). The north coast of the Paria Peninsula is the main nesting zone for the leatherback sea turtle (Dermochelys coriacea) in Venezuela. Maragarita is home to subspecies of the eastern cottontail (Sylvilagus floridanus margaritae) and the Margaritan tufted capuchin (Sapajus apella margaritae).

== Status ==
The World Wildlife Fund gives the ecoregion the status of "Critical/Endangered". Deforestation and exploitation of sand and gravel around streams in Macanao threatens the habitat of the Yellow-shouldered Amazon. The capture for trade of Yellow-shouldered Amazon and blue-crowned Parakeet threaten these species with extinction. All the dry vegetation in Araya and Macanao is at risk from overgrazing by goats. Adventure tourists drive vehicles along the protected beaches of La Restinga National Park and destroy turtle nests. The Cumaná lagoons are threatened by urbanization, pollution and introduction of exotic species.

Protected areas include the Kronstadt Island Wildlife Sanctuary and the Mochima National Park. Protected areas in Margarita Island include the 7,130 hectares (17,600 acres) Cerro El Copey National Park, the Cerro Matasiete and the Guayamurí Natural Monument, which together cover most of the forest on the island. The 18,862 hectares (46,610 acres) Laguna de la Restinga National Park on the northern Macanao Peninsular protects mangroves and some adjoining arid areas. The Laguna de Las Marites Natural Monument also protects mangroves. Within it is Las Tetas de María Guevara Monument, which also protects some arid areas.

== Sources ==
- "Araya and Paria xeric scrub", Global Species, Myers Enterprises II
- Bonaccorso, Elisa, Northern South America: Northern Venezuela, WWF: World Wildlife Fund
- WildFinder, WWF: World Wildlife Fund
