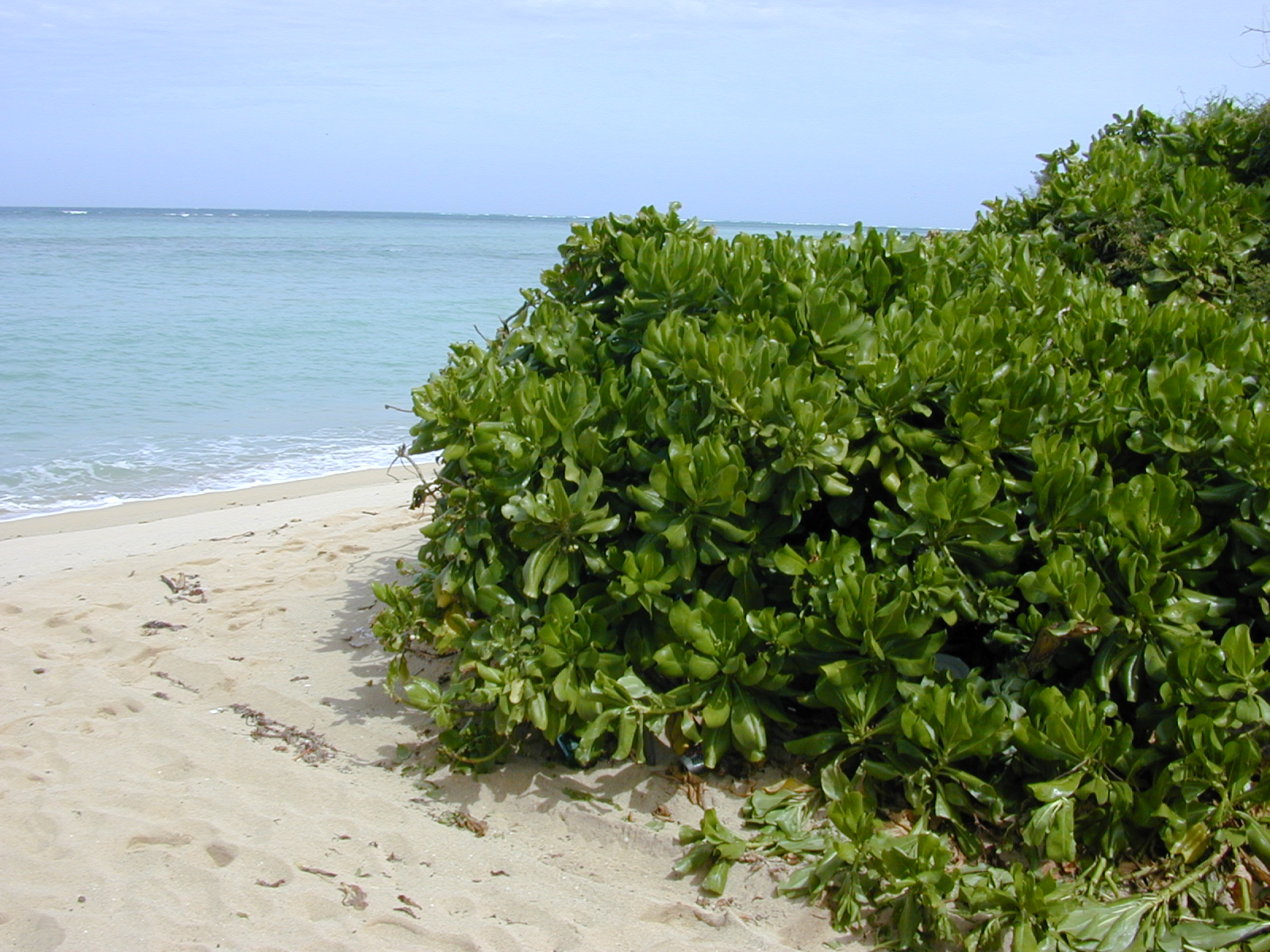
- In its typical habitat; Maui, Kanaha Beach
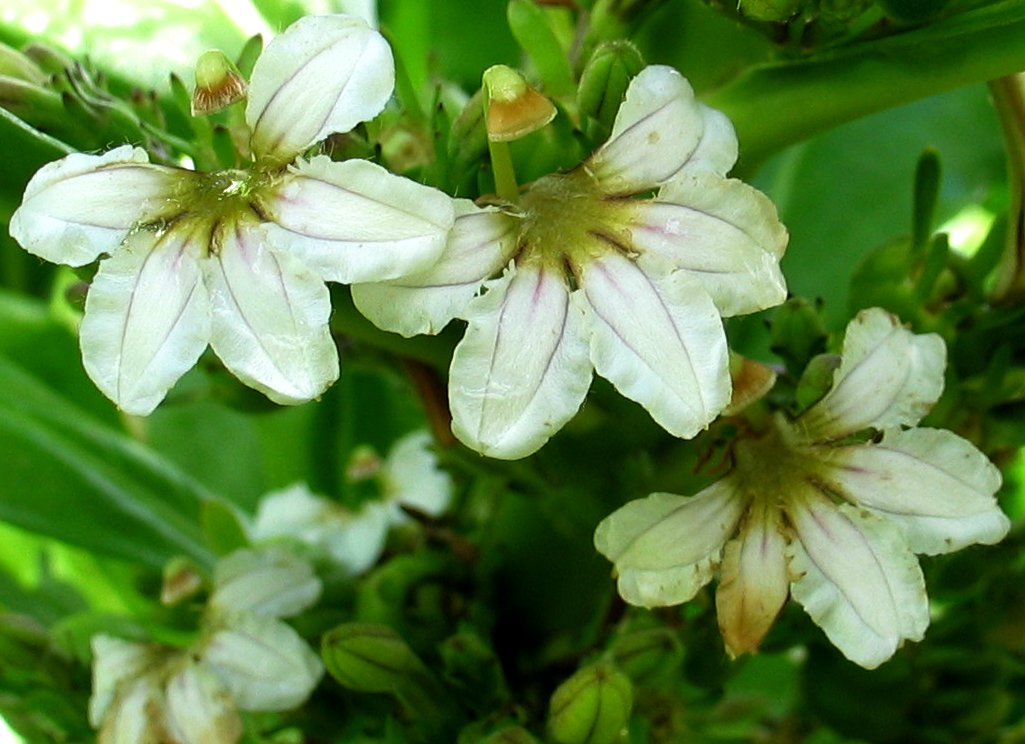
- Flower

Scientific classification
- Kingdom: Plantae
- Clade: Tracheophytes
- Clade: Angiosperms
- Clade: Eudicots
- Clade: Asterids
- Order: Asterales
- Family: Goodeniaceae
- Genus: Scaevola
- Species: S. taccada

Binomial name
- Scaevola taccada (Gaertn.) Roxb.

Synonyms
- Lobelia frutescens Mill.; Lobelia koenigii (Vahl) Saff.; Lobelia piliplena Kuntze; Lobelia sericea Kuntze; Lobelia sericea var. koenigii (M.Vahl) Kuntze; Lobelia velutina Kuntze; Scaevola bela-modagani Schult.; Scaevola billardierei D.Dietr.; Scaevola chlorantha de Vriese; Scaevola fauriei H.Lév.; Scaevola frutescens (Mill.) K.Krause; Scaevola koenigii Vahl; Scaevola lambertiana de Vriese; Scaevola lativaga Hance; Scaevola leschenaultii DC.; Scaevola macrocalyx de Vriese; Scaevola piliplena Miq.; Scaevola plumerioides Nutt.; Scaevola sericea (Gaertn.) Roxb.; Scaevola velutina C.Presl

= Scaevola taccada =

Species of flowering plant

Scaevola taccada, also known as beach cabbage, sea lettuce, or beach naupaka, is a flowering plant in the family Goodeniaceae found in mangrove swamps and rocky or sandy coastal locations in the tropical areas of the Indo-Pacific. It is a common beach shrub throughout the Arabian Sea, the tropical Indian Ocean and the tropical islands of the Pacific Ocean.

There has long been confusion over the correct scientific name for this species. It is also known by the synonym Scaevola sericea.

== Description ==
Scaevola taccada is a large bush that grows up to about 3–10 metres typical of littoral zones where it grows very close to the sea exposed to the salt spray, usually on sandy or pebbly soils. The branchlets are 1–1.5 cm thick with white tufts at the leaf axils.

Leaves are slightly succulent about 8–25 cm cm long, closely alternate or in a spiral and crowded at the stem tips. They are glabrous with a fleshy-looking yellowish green color.

=== Flowers and fruit ===
It flowers every time of the year in fan-like clusters which gives them the name fanflower or half flower. Each flower has white petals between 2–2.5 cm long, sometimes with violet stripes. Each flower has a curved style. They are pollinated by large bees or on its own.

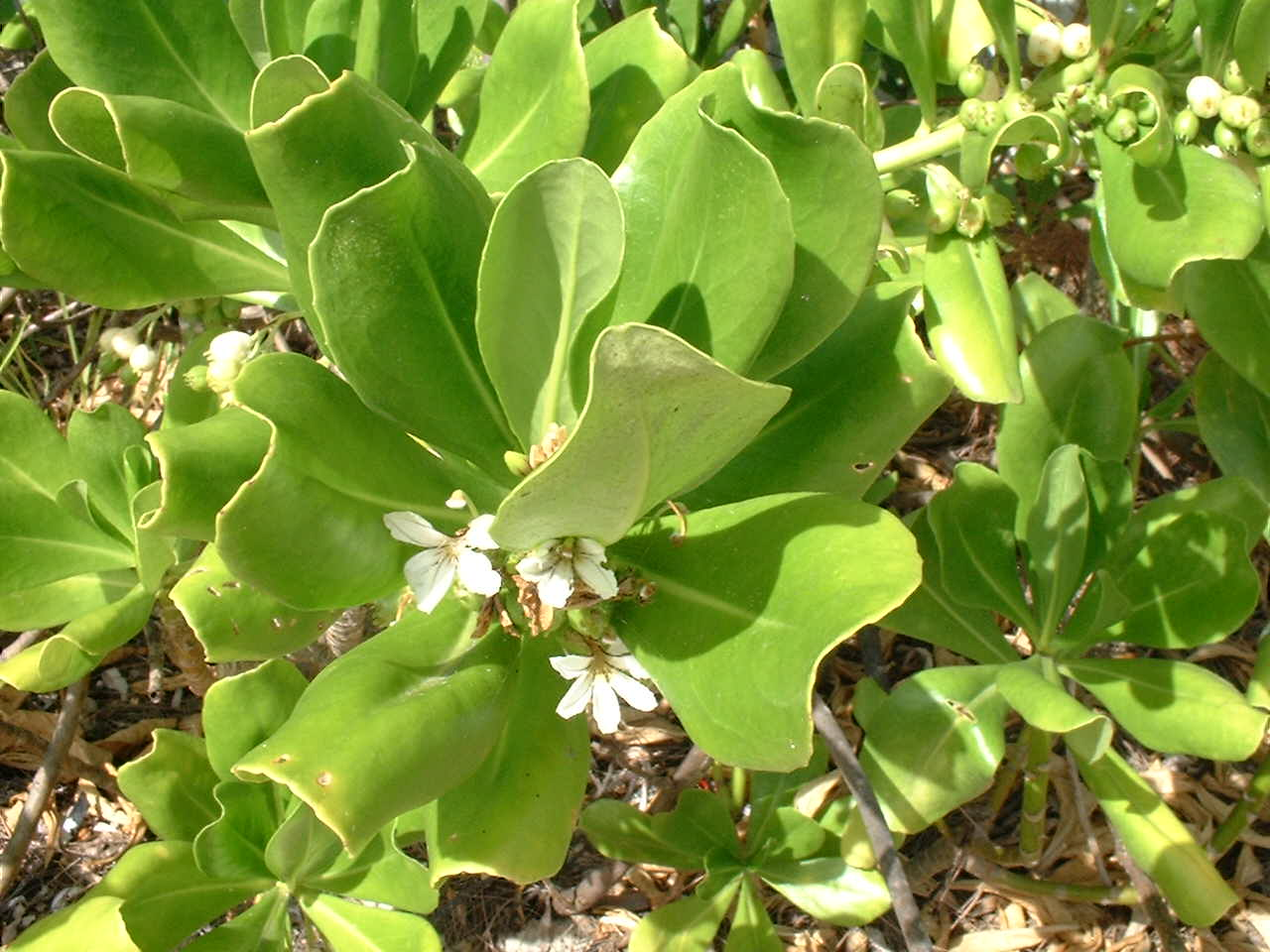
Leaves and flowers

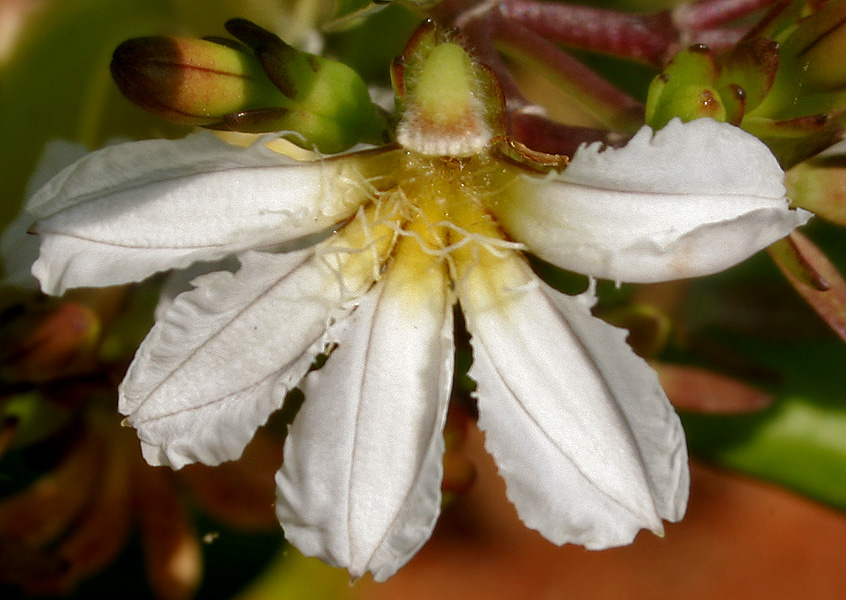
Closeup of a flower from Andhra Pradesh, India.

The fruit is a round, fleshy drupe between 1–15 mm. It is similar to the fruit of S. plumieri – both were included in the original circumscription of the species. S. taccada has evident calyx lobes and white fruit on which the calyx lobes persist. S. plumieri has short or absent lobes on its calyx and its fruit turns black fruit when ripe, but ripe S. taccada fruit turns from green to white. They can float in seawater and are propagated by ocean currents, this bush is a pioneer plant in new sandbanks in tropical areas.

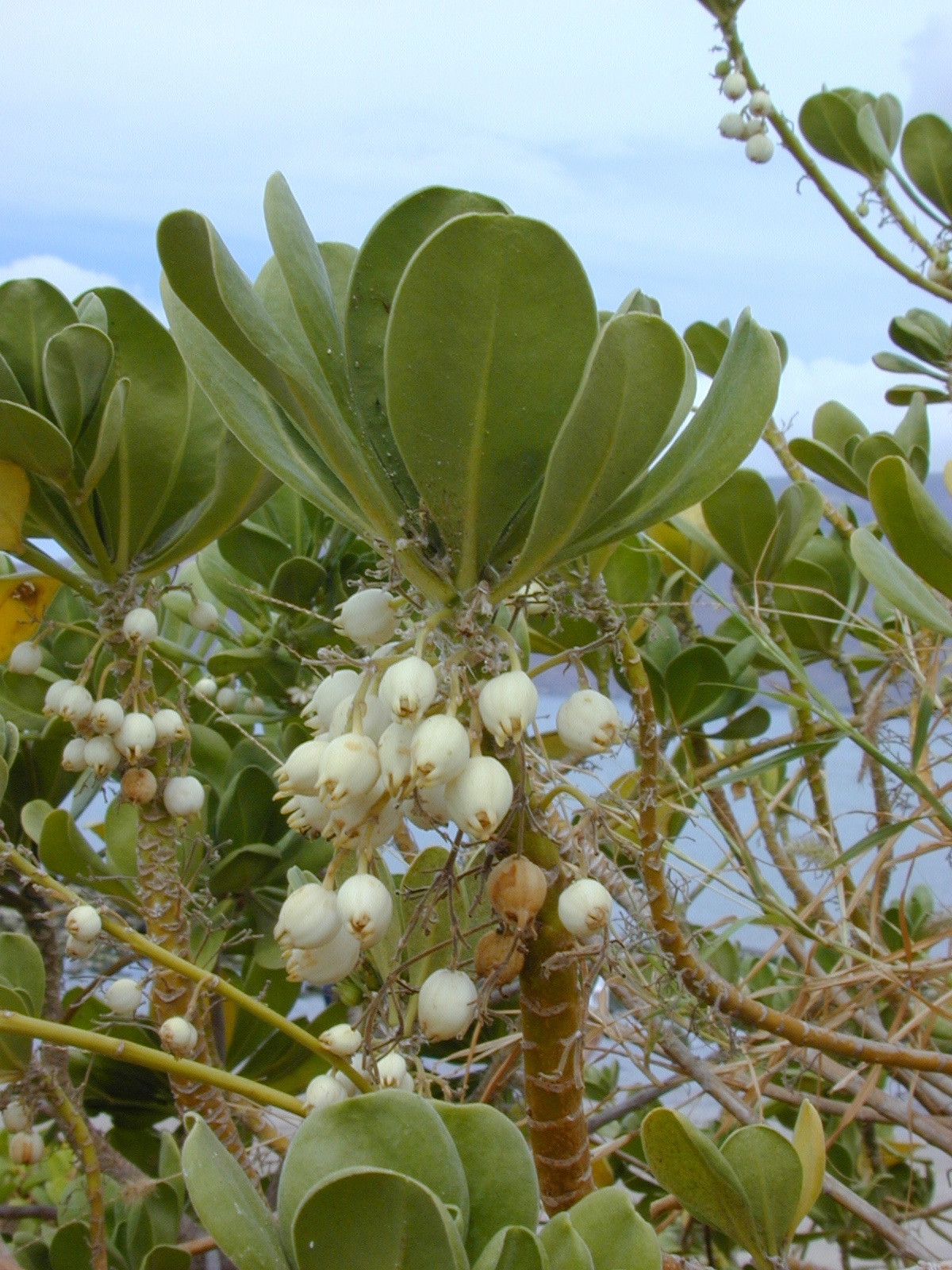
Fruits, Maui, Kihei

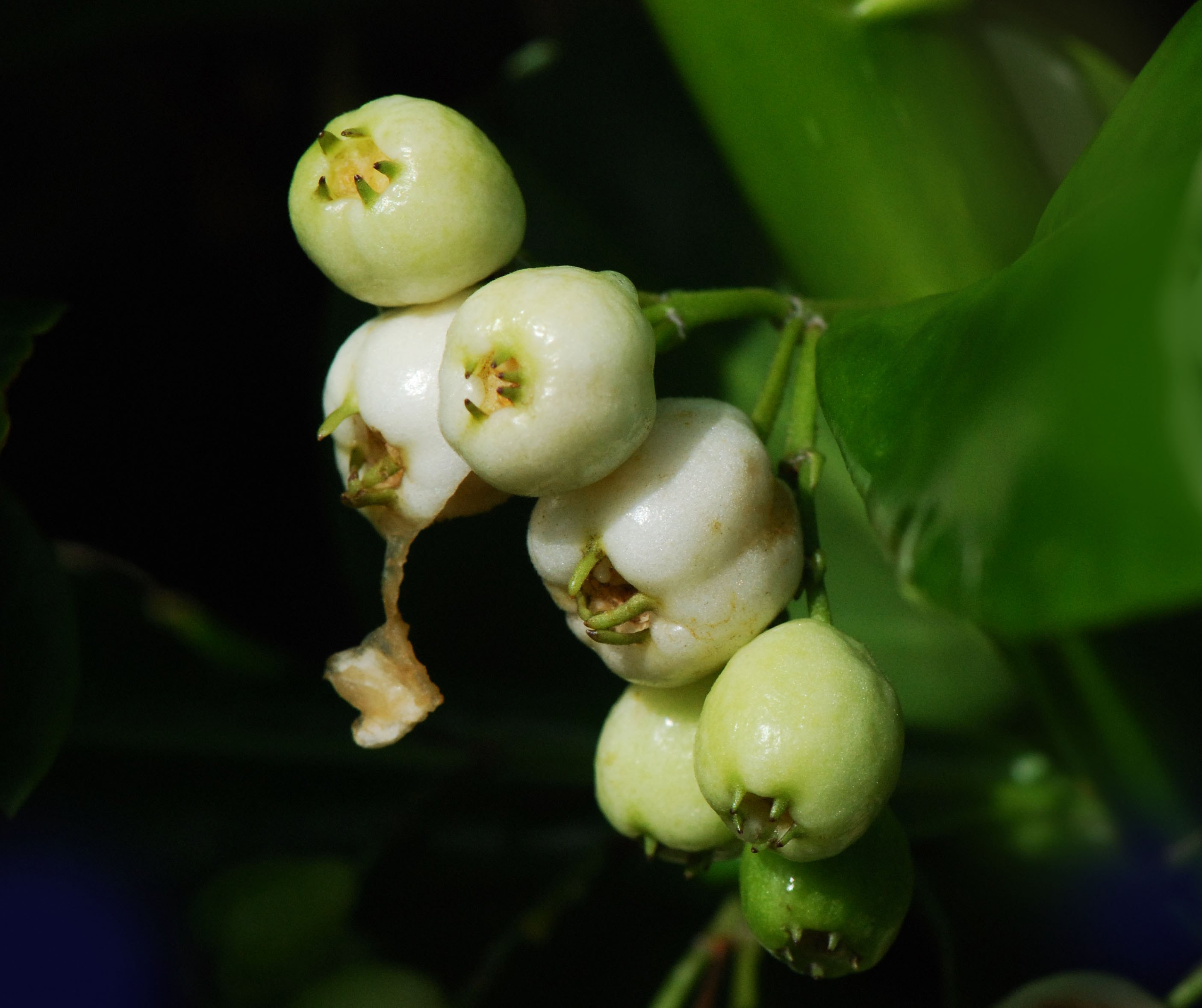
White fruit of S. taccada with persistent calyx lobes

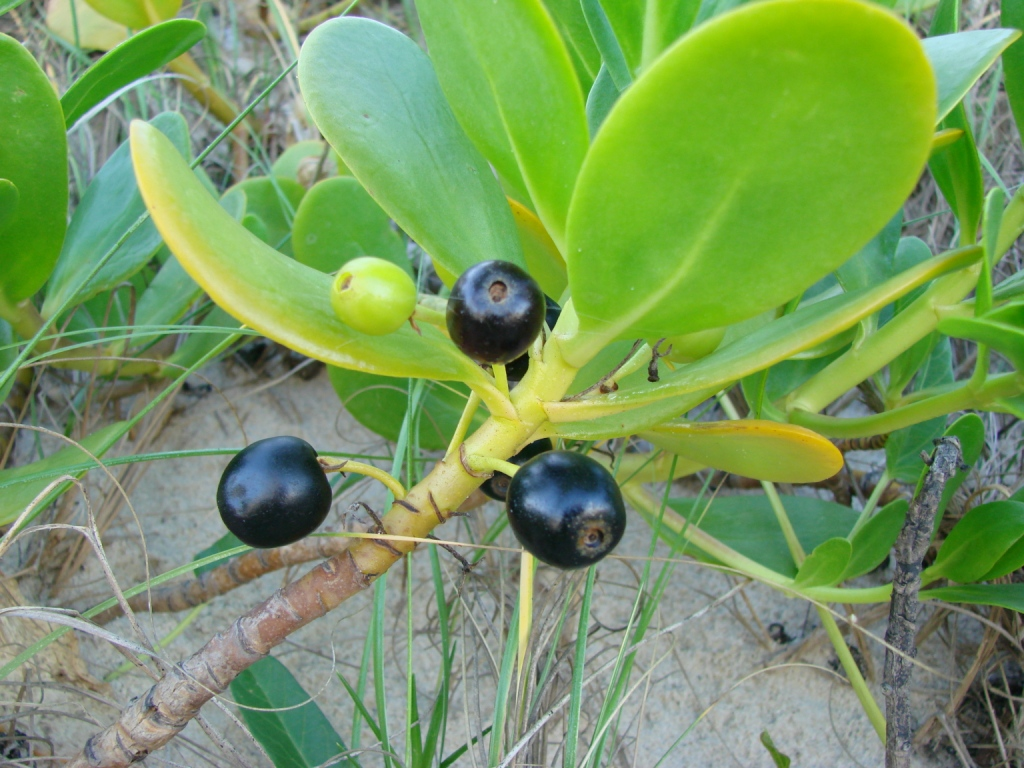
Black fruit of S. plumieri

== Taxonomy ==
Two shrubby Scaevola species occur along the coasts of tropical and subtropical regions of the world. They sometimes occur in the same region, but one is more western, reaching Atlantic coasts, and one more eastern, reaching out into the Pacific. Carl Linnaeus initially included both species in his Lobelia plumieri, which he later considered to be the sole species in his new genus Scaevola (although the combination Scaevola plumieri was first published by Martin Vahl). There has been confusion for many years over the correct name of the two species when they are recognized as distinct. Scaevola plumieri (L.) Vahl is now used as the name for the western species.

The earliest name now recognized as applying to the eastern species, Lobelia taccada, was published by Joseph Gaertner in 1788. William Roxburgh indirectly referred to this name when transferring it to the genus Scaevola in 1788. Separately, and later, Martin Vahl described Scaevola sericea in 1791, based on a specimen from Niue, a small island in the south Pacific Ocean. In 1980, Jeffrey argued that the correct name for the species was Scaevola sericea, since Roxburgh's transfer was not acceptable under the nomenclature code. However, Green in 1991 considered that Jeffrey was mistaken, the transfer being valid, so that the correct name for the eastern species was Scaevola taccada, the name used, for example, by the online Flora of China. The International Plant Names Index accepts this analysis.

== Distribution ==
The species is found in coastal areas and beaches of Okinawa, Taiwan, Southern China, Vietnam, Malaysia, Philippines, Indonesia, East Timor, Northern Australia, Polynesia, Melanesia, Micronesia, East Africa, Madagascar, Mauritius, Seychelles, Oman, Yemen, India, Maldives, Burma, Thailand, Cambodia, Chagos Islands, Comoros, and Réunion.

In the United States (Florida, Puerto Rico, US Virgin Islands) as well as many other Caribbean nations and the Bahamas, Scaevola taccada has become an invasive species, pushing away the native Caribbean Scaevola plumieri species from its native habitat.

== Habitat ==
Scaevola taccada typically grows directly on the beaches of tropical coasts with a preference for beach crests on coral sands. It grows within the salt spray area and it is amongst the first pioneer plant colonisers on tropical atolls and sandbanks. Besides seeds, it is easily propagated from cuttings.

It prefers well drained sandy soils and it is a very salt tolerant scrub. However, its roots cannot stand direct seawater that rises frequently. Scaevola taccada is sometimes found growing in loose plant communities with coconut palms, soldierbush, beach morning glory, beach gardenia, several pandanus species, beach calophyllum followed by portia tree, sea almond, beach hibiscus, Cordia subcordata and others. The plant is often featured prominently on tropical island postcards and wallpapers.

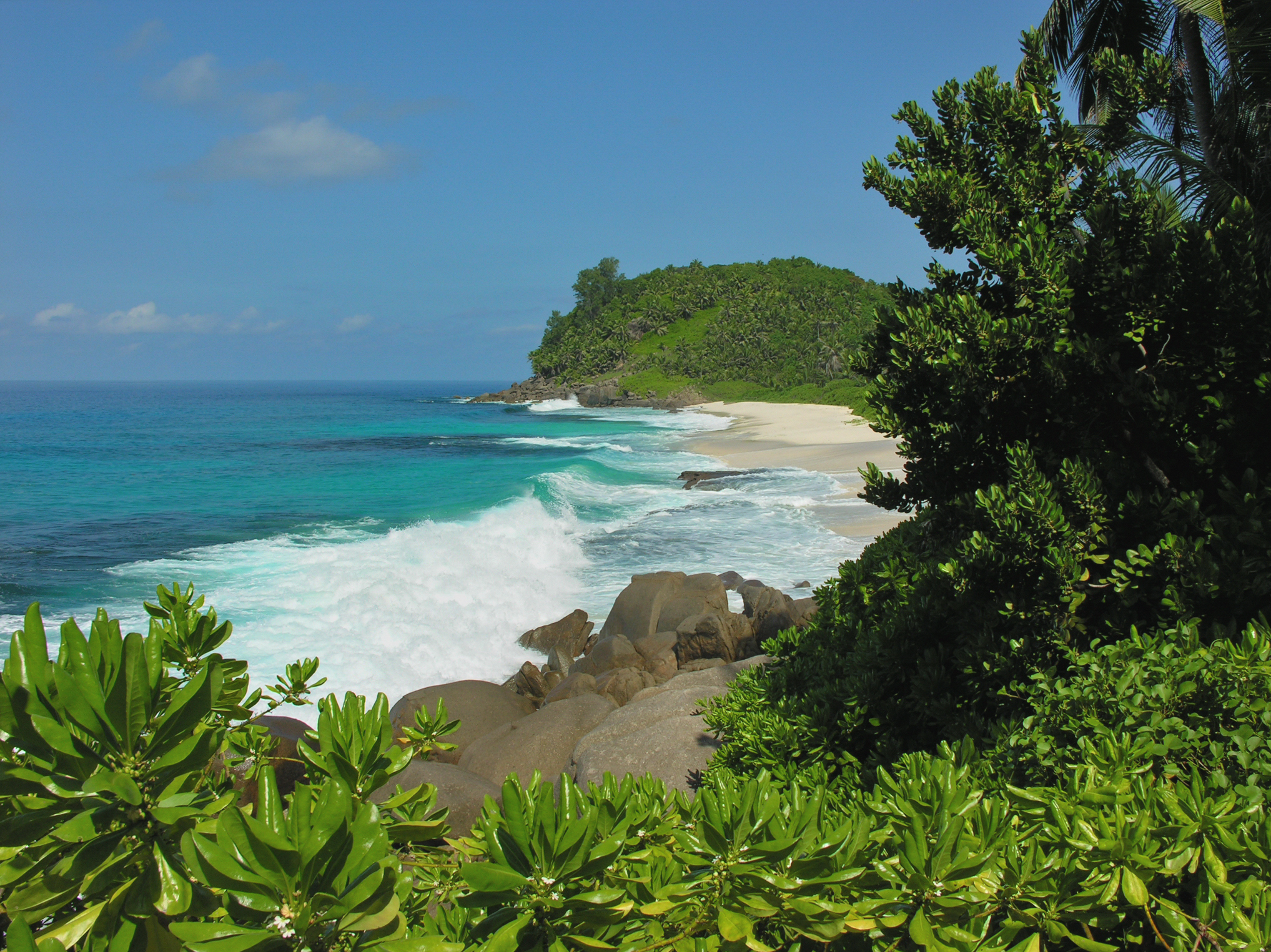
Habitat, Seychelles

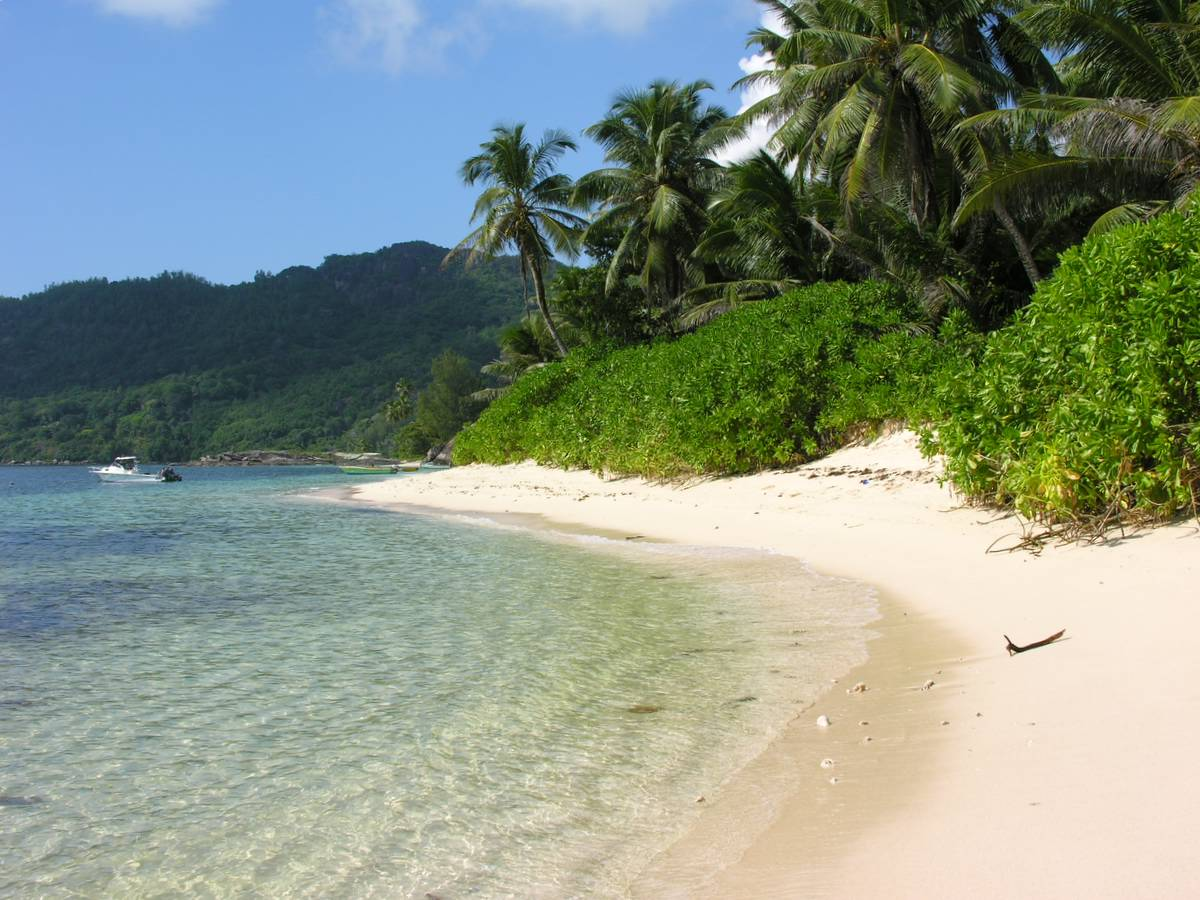
Seashore habitat on a beach in the Seychelles.

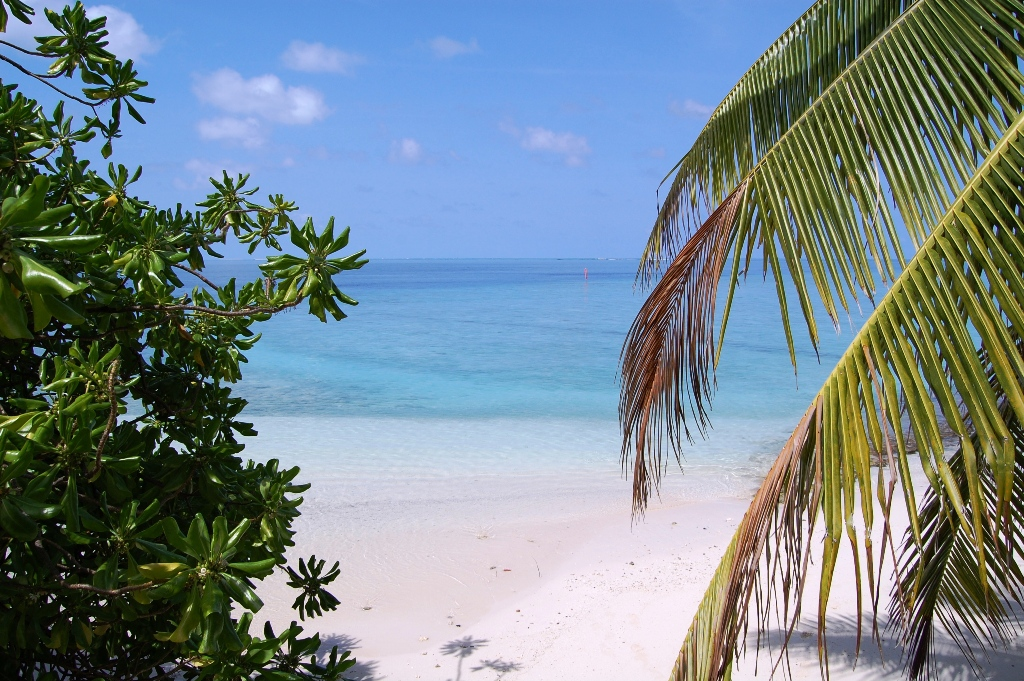
Habitat, Maldives

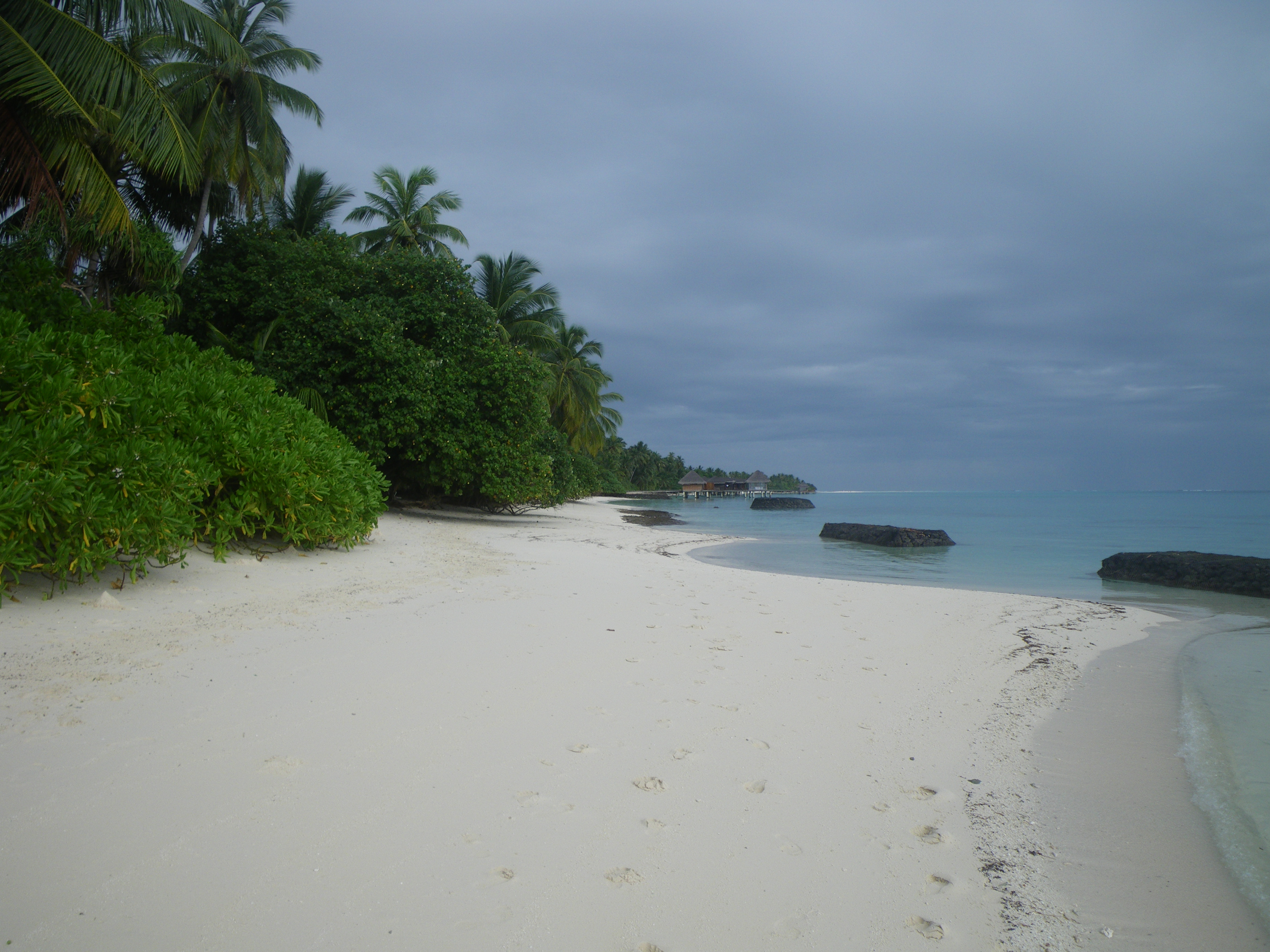
Habitat, Kuramathi, Maldives.

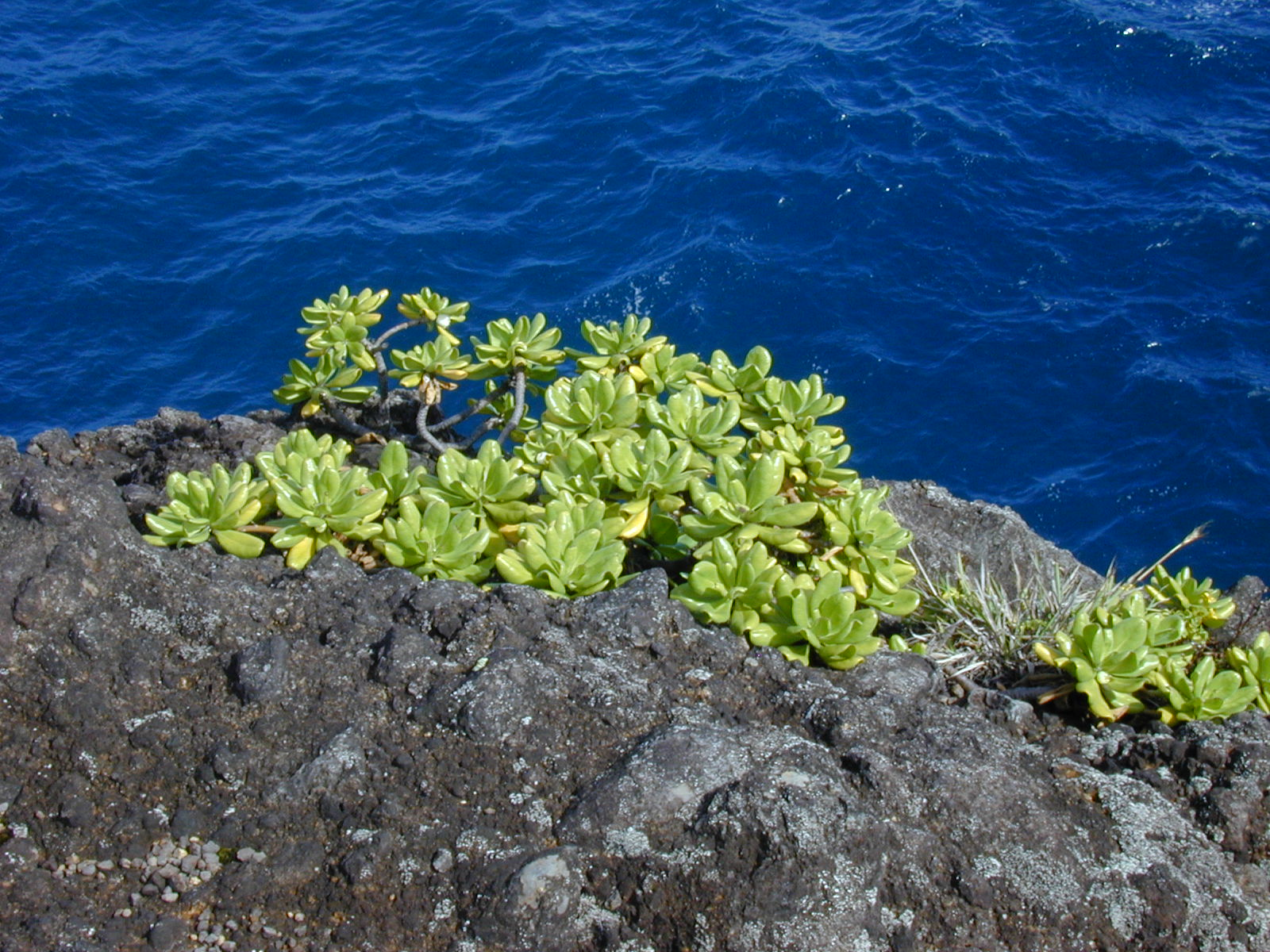
Bush growing on rocky volcanic soil

== Use ==
In some islands of the Pacific, Scaevola taccada is used to prevent coastal erosion as well as for landscaping. It is also planted on the beach crests to protect other cultivated plants from the salt spray.

S. taccada trees provide a safe and shady environment for female green turtles coming to shore to lay their eggs.

Parts of the plant are also used in Polynesian and Asian traditional medicine. Drops from the plant were used in cases of eye irritation by Chamorro breath-hold spearfishermen in the Mariana Islands. Historically in the Maldives the leaves of this plant were often used as famine food.

== Gallery ==
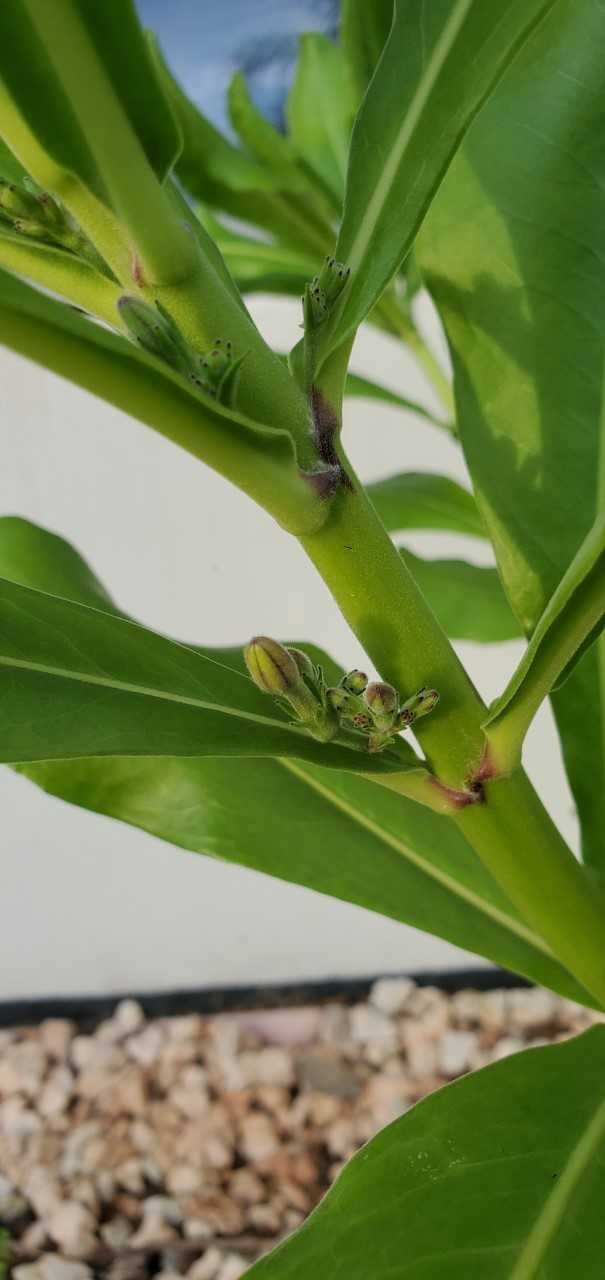
Flower buds. Dededo, Guam

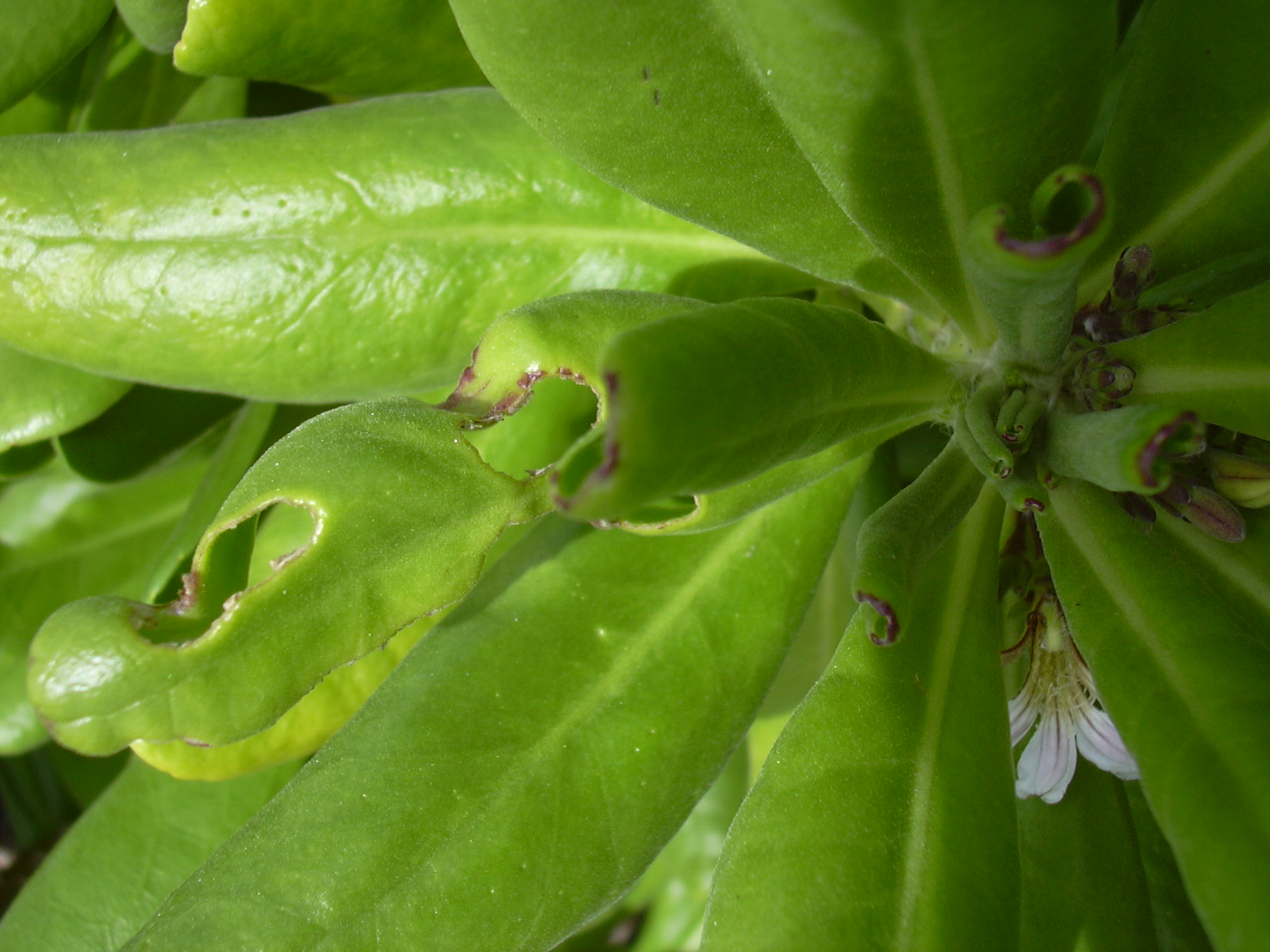
Leaves damaged by the larvae of the Udea litorea moth

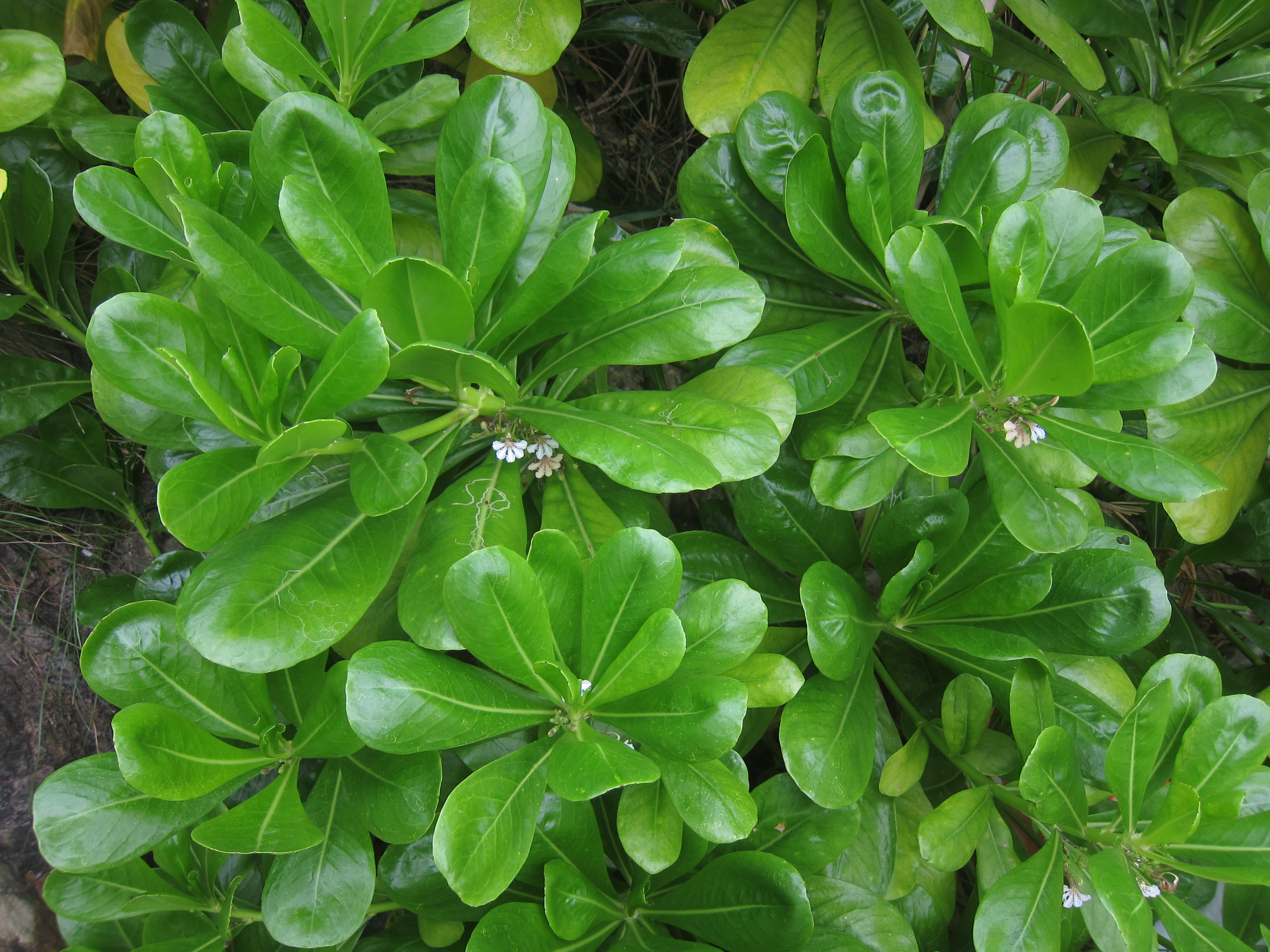
Clusters in Ap Lei Chau, Hong Kong
