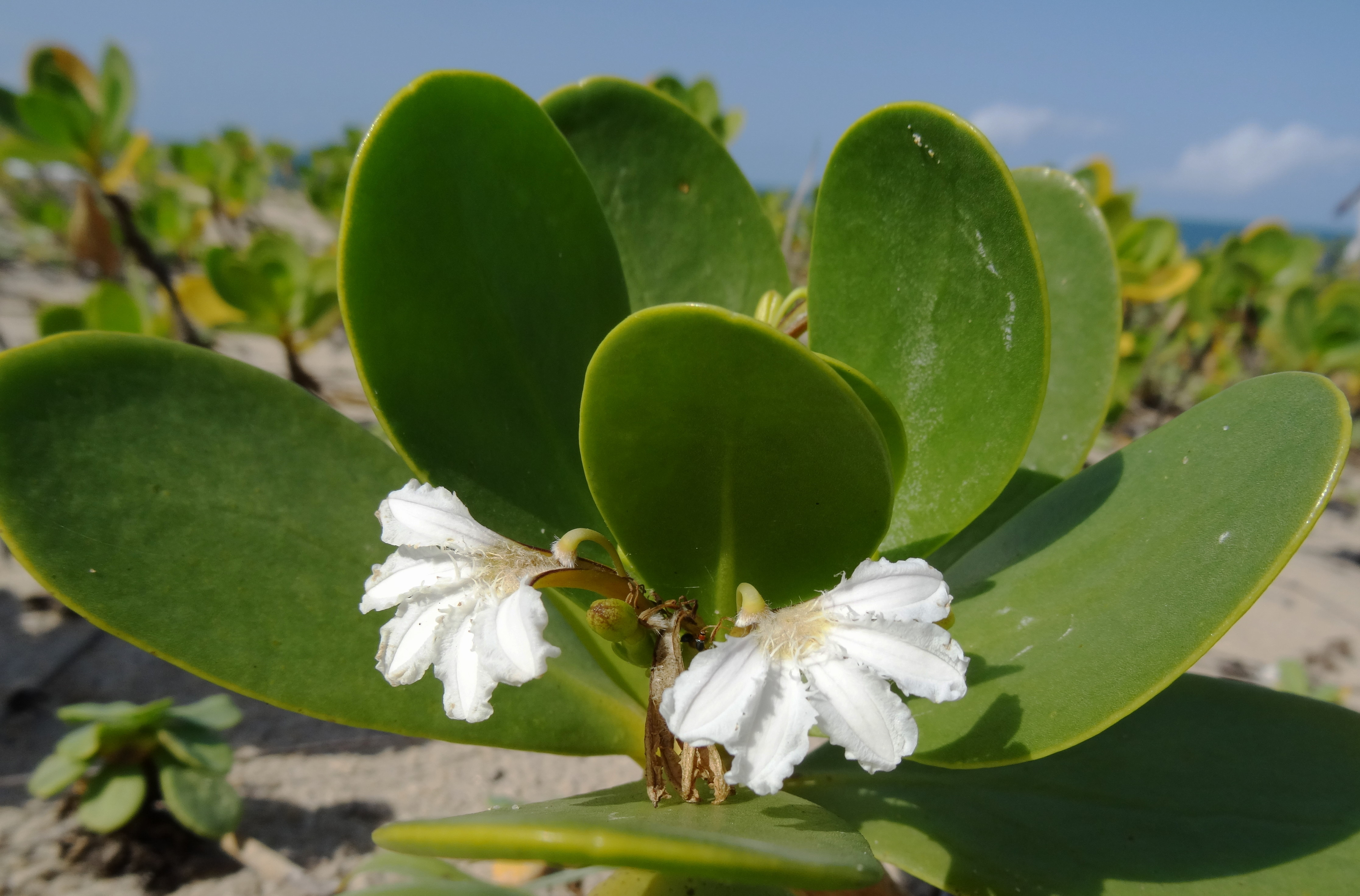
- Xai-Xai beach (Mozambique)

Conservation status
- Least Concern (IUCN 3.1)

Scientific classification
- Kingdom: Plantae
- Clade: Tracheophytes
- Clade: Angiosperms
- Clade: Eudicots
- Clade: Asterids
- Order: Asterales
- Family: Goodeniaceae
- Genus: Scaevola
- Species: S. plumieri

Binomial name
- Scaevola plumieri (L.) Vahl
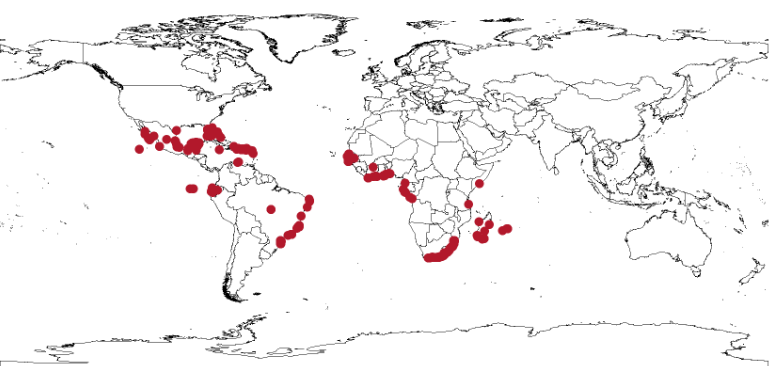
- Occurrence data from GBIF doi:10.15468/dl.zya4je

Synonyms
- Lobelia plumieri L. Scaevola ivifolia L'Hér. ex Sweet; Scaevola macraei de Vriese; Scaevola senegalensis C.Presl; Scaevola sieberi de Vriese; Scaevola thunbergii Eckl. & Zeyh. Scaevola uvifera Stocks

= Scaevola plumieri =

Species of flowering plant

Scaevola plumieri (common name gullfeed) is a species of plant in the family Goodeniaceae which grows on coastal dunes in the tropics and subtropics.

== Description ==
Scaevola plumieri is a many branched evergreen shrub, which has succulent hairless leaves at the tips of its branches, shedding its leaves below the tips to leave leaf-scars on the yellowy-green stems below. The leaf-axils can have either sparse silky hairs or none, and the leaves are either stalkless (sessile) or with a winged stalk, obovate, 5–11 cm. long, 2–7 cm. broad, and smooth-edged. There are 2-4 pairs lateral veins which are not easily seen. The inflorescence is a series cymes in the axils with one to seven stalkless flowers. The corolla is white or greenish with a tube 10–12 mm. long, 3 mm. broad, and crowded with hairs inside. The ovary is 2-locular but only one ovule develops. The fleshy fruit is blue or black and from 10 to 15 mm in diameter. The seeds do not disperse from the fruit.

Scaevola plumieri is similar to Scaevola taccada – both were included in the original circumscription of the species. S. plumieri has short or absent lobes on its calyx and black fruit when ripe. S. sericea has evident calyx lobes and white fruit on which the calyx lobes persist.

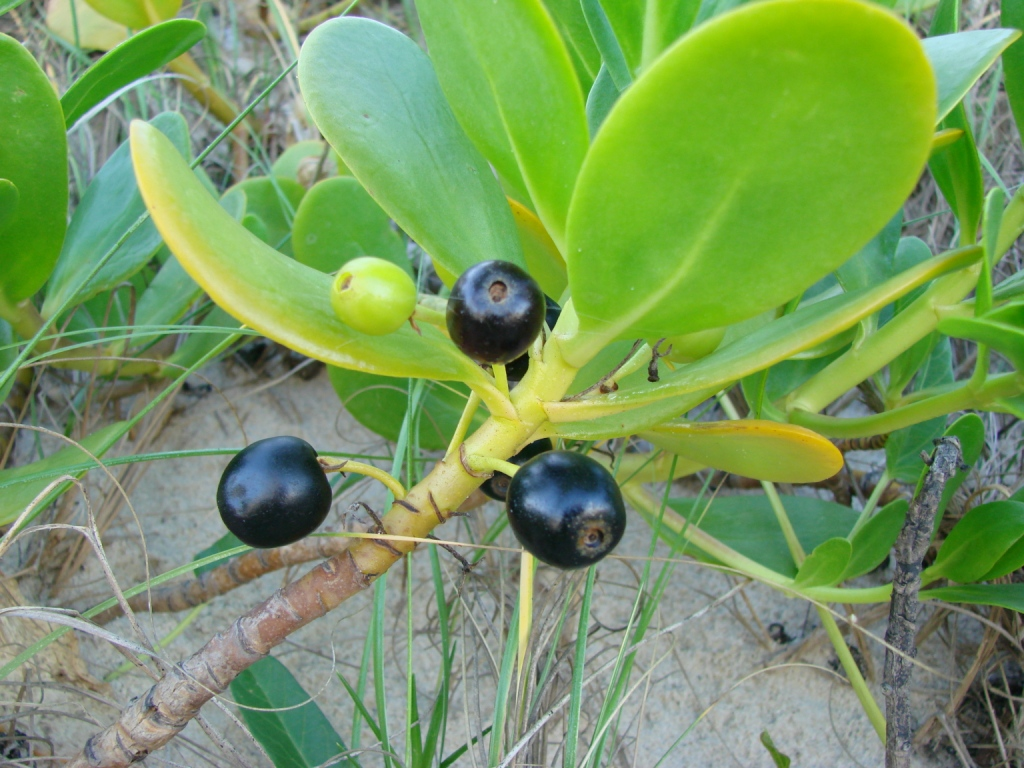
Black fruit of S. plumieri

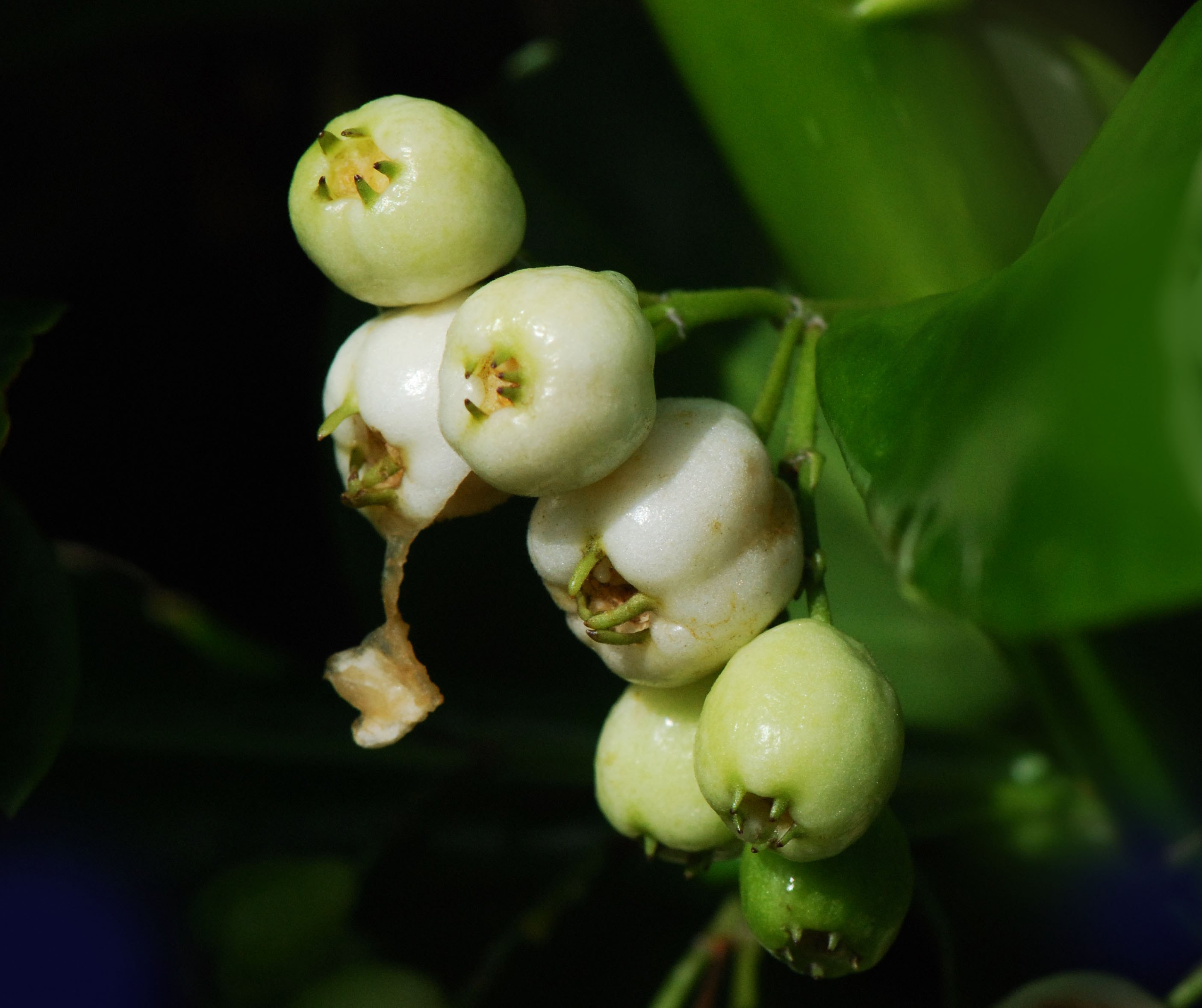
White fruit of S. taccada with persistent calyx lobes

== Taxonomy ==
Scaevola plumieri was first described by Carl Linnaeus in 1753 as Lobelia plumierii, supplemented by Linnaeus' description of Lobelia in 1747. Linnaeus later considered it to be the sole species in his new genus Scaevola, although the combination Scaevola plumieri was first published by Martin Vahl in 1791.

== Distribution and habitat ==
Scaevola plumieri is found on the coasts of east Africa from Somalia to South Africa, the coasts of west Africa from S. Tomé to Angola, Ceylon, and tropical America south of Florida. It inhabits coastal sand-dunes.

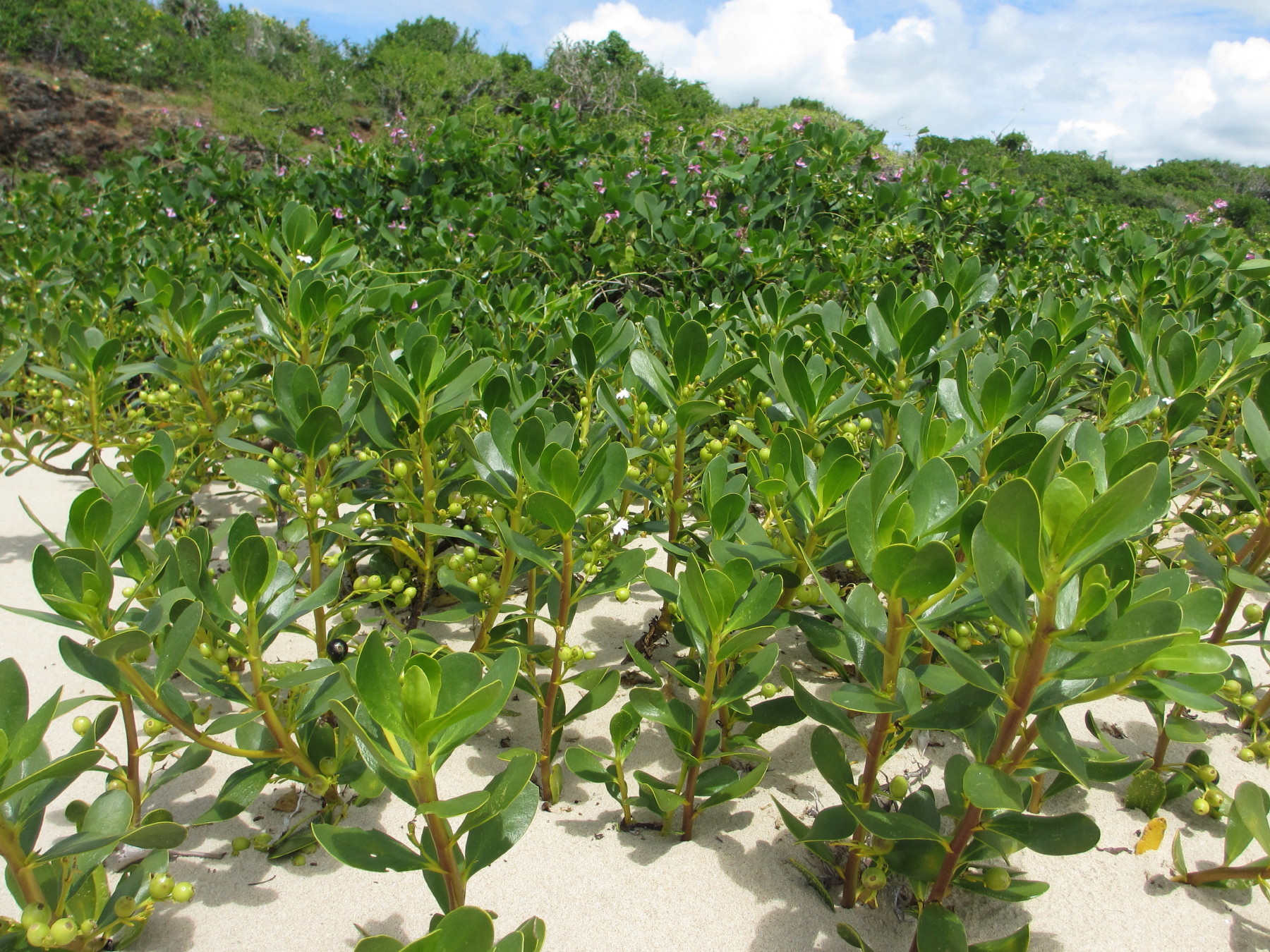
Sand-dune Mozambique

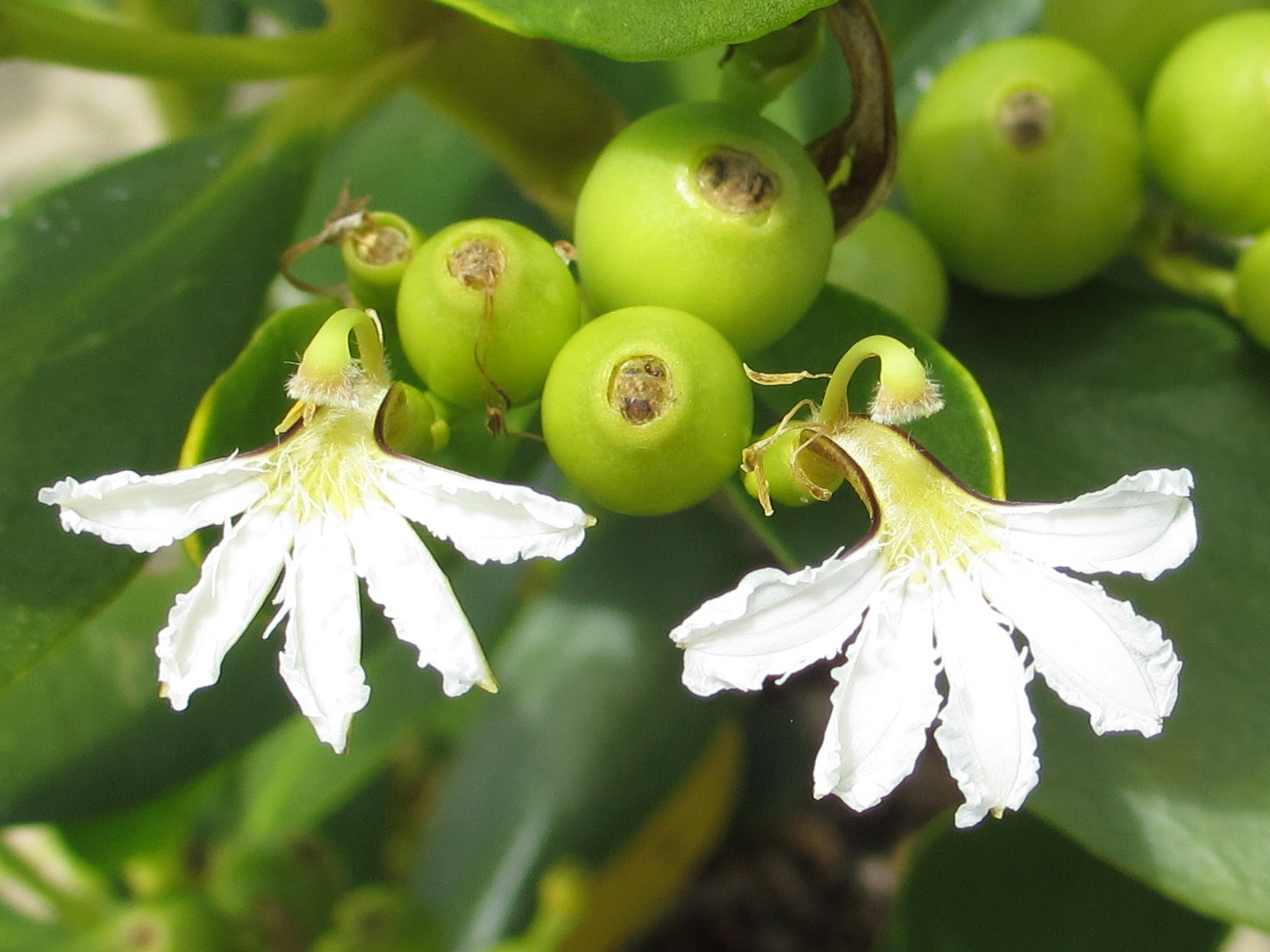
Fruit & Flowers
