= Cyperus planifolius =

Conservation status
- Least Concern (IUCN 3.1)

Scientific classification
- Kingdom: Plantae
- Clade: Tracheophytes
- Clade: Angiosperms
- Clade: Monocots
- Clade: Commelinids
- Order: Poales
- Family: Cyperaceae
- Genus: Cyperus
- Species: C. planifolius

Binomial name
- Cyperus planifolius Rich., 1792

Synonyms
- Cyperus brunneus Sw.; Mariscus planifolius (Rich.) Urb.

Species of sedge

Cyperus planifolius, commonly known as flatleaf flatsedge, is a species of sedge that is native to southern parts of North America, Central America, the Caribbean, and northern parts of South America.

== See also ==
- List of Cyperus species
