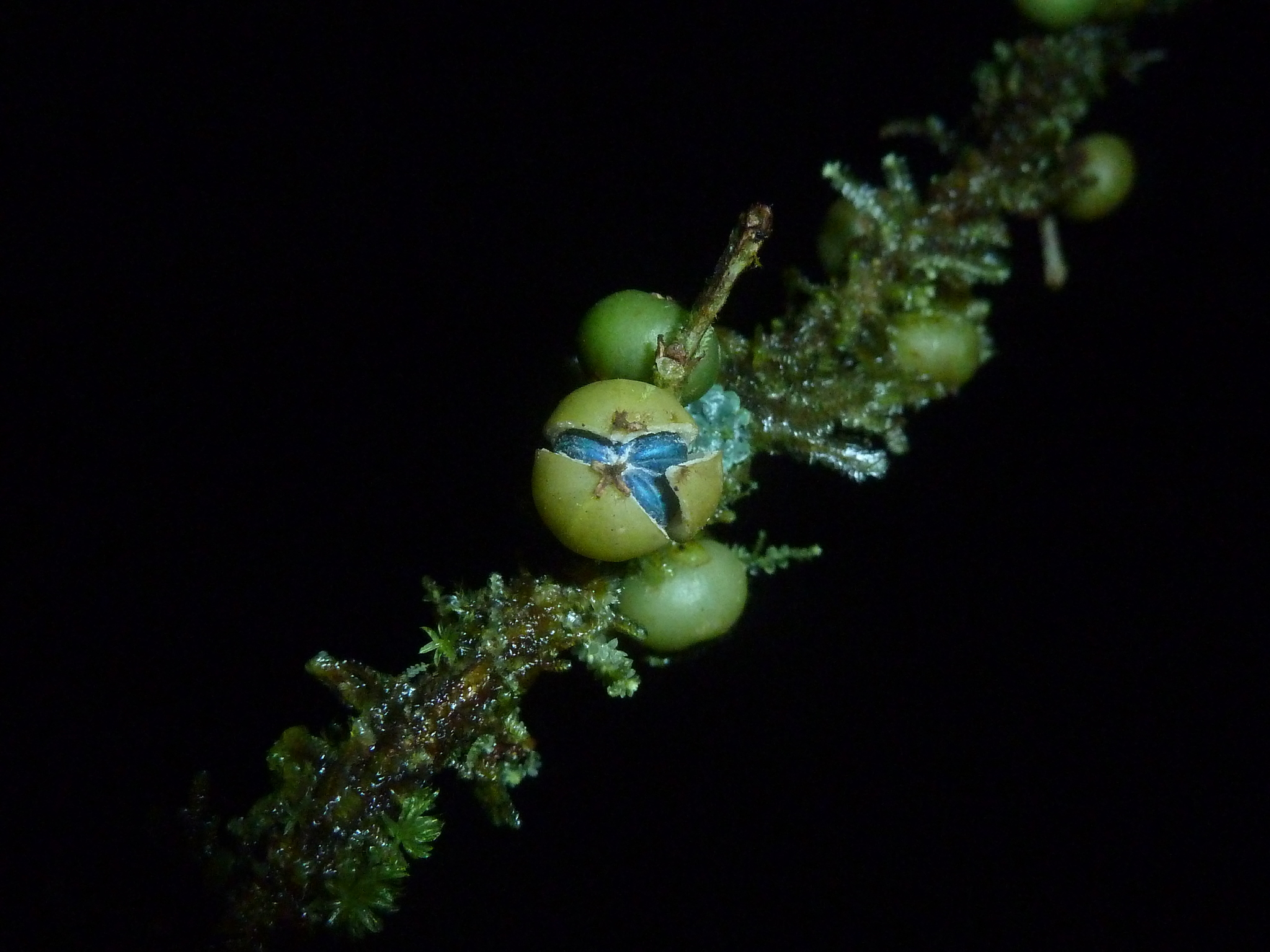

Scientific classification
- Kingdom: Plantae
- Clade: Tracheophytes
- Clade: Angiosperms
- Clade: Eudicots
- Clade: Rosids
- Order: Malpighiales
- Family: Phyllanthaceae
- Genus: Margaritaria
- Species: M. nobilis

Binomial name
- Margaritaria nobilis L.f.

= Margaritaria nobilis =

Species of tree

Margaritaria nobilis, also known as bastard hogberry, is a fruit-bearing plant found in Mexico, Central America, South America, and the West Indies.

The fruit is a bright iridescent blue color, resulting from a complex surface structure which interferes with light waves.
