= Blue Mountain Peak =

Highest mountain in Jamaica

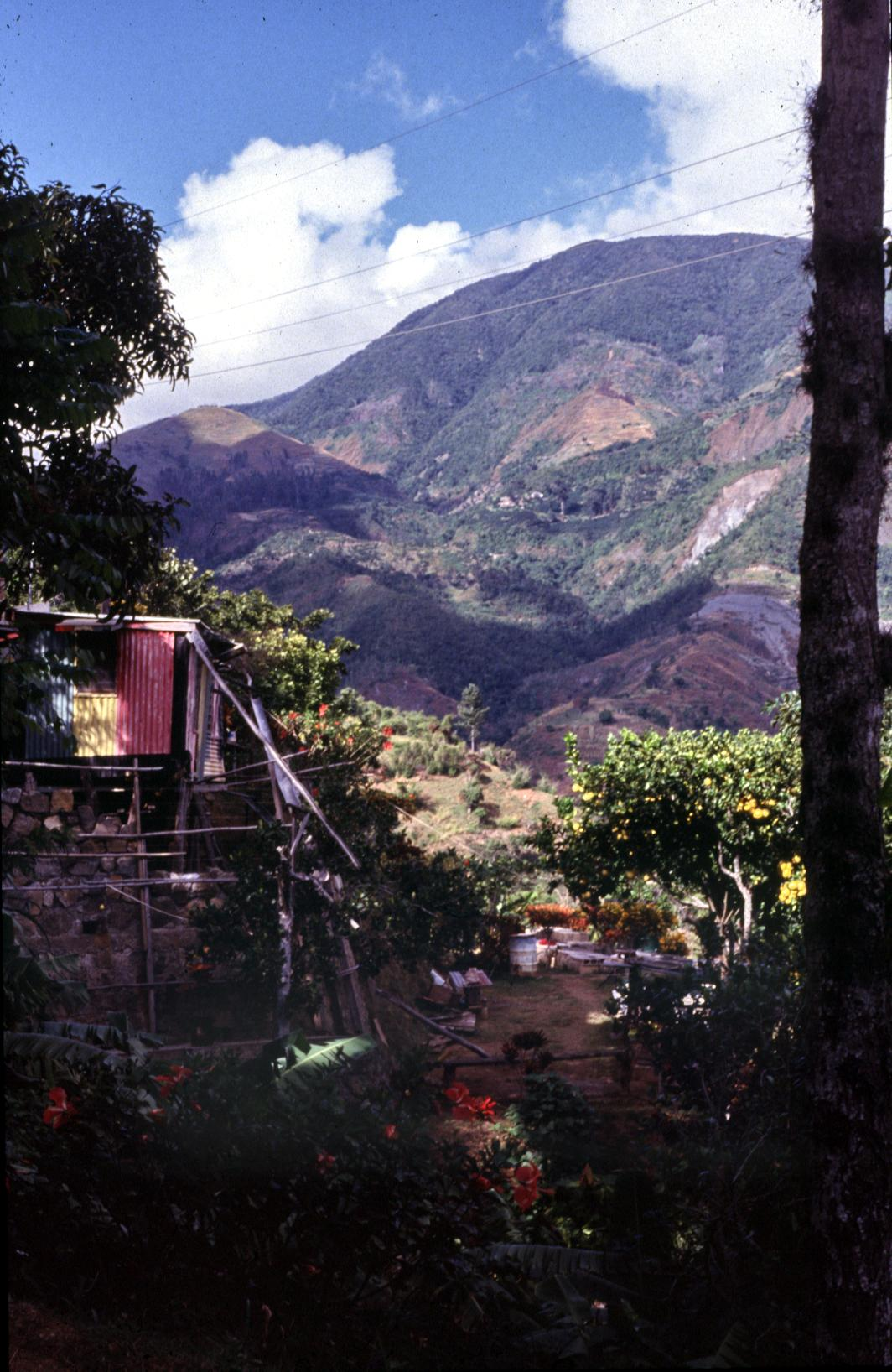

Highest point
- Elevation: 2,256 m (7,402 ft)
- Prominence: 2,256 m (7,402 ft)
- Listing: Island high point 56th; North America prominent peak 57th; North America isolated peaks 70th; Country high point; Ultra
- Coordinates: 18°02′48″N 76°34′45″W

Geography
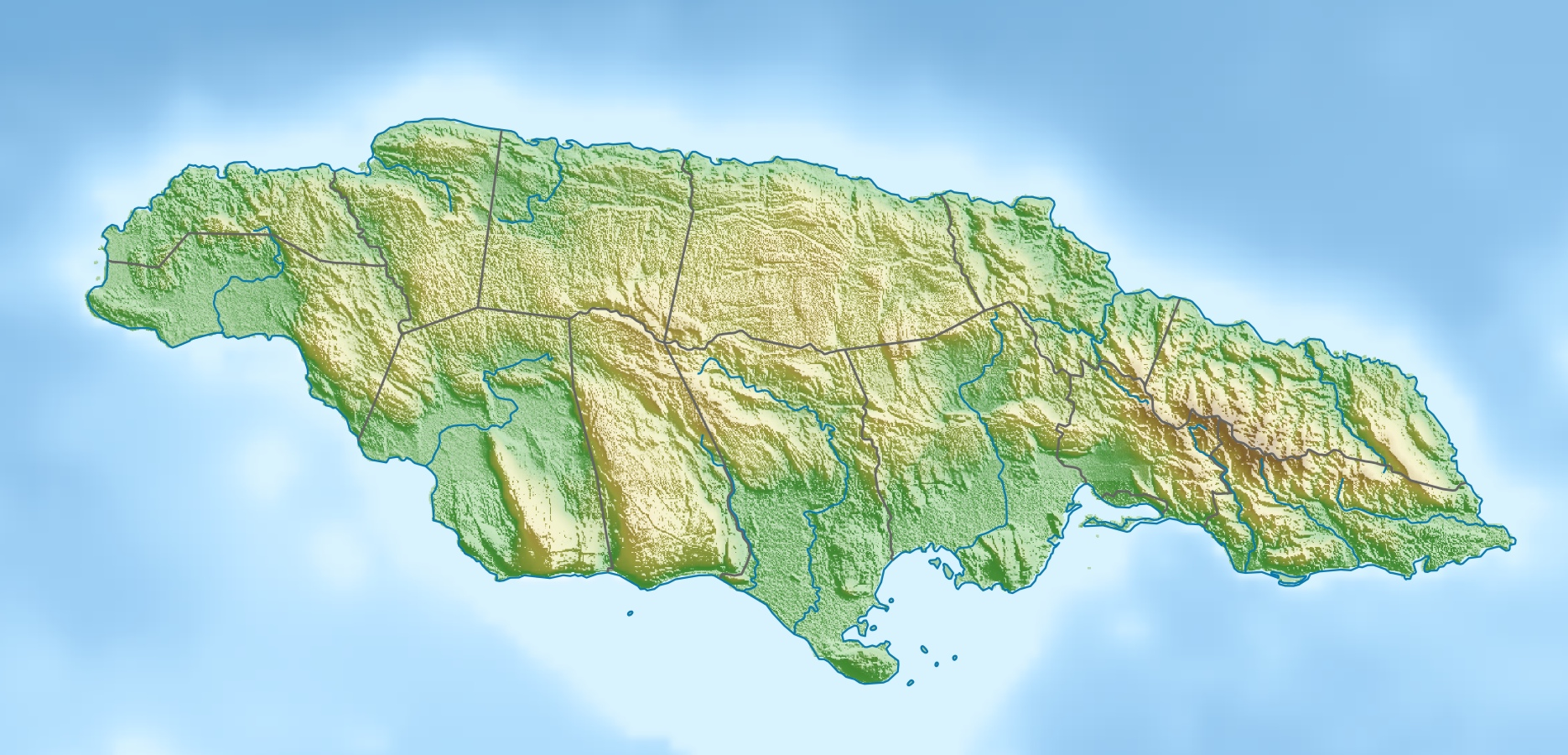
- Location within Jamaica
- Location: Portland / Saint Thomas, Jamaica
- Parent range: Blue Mountains

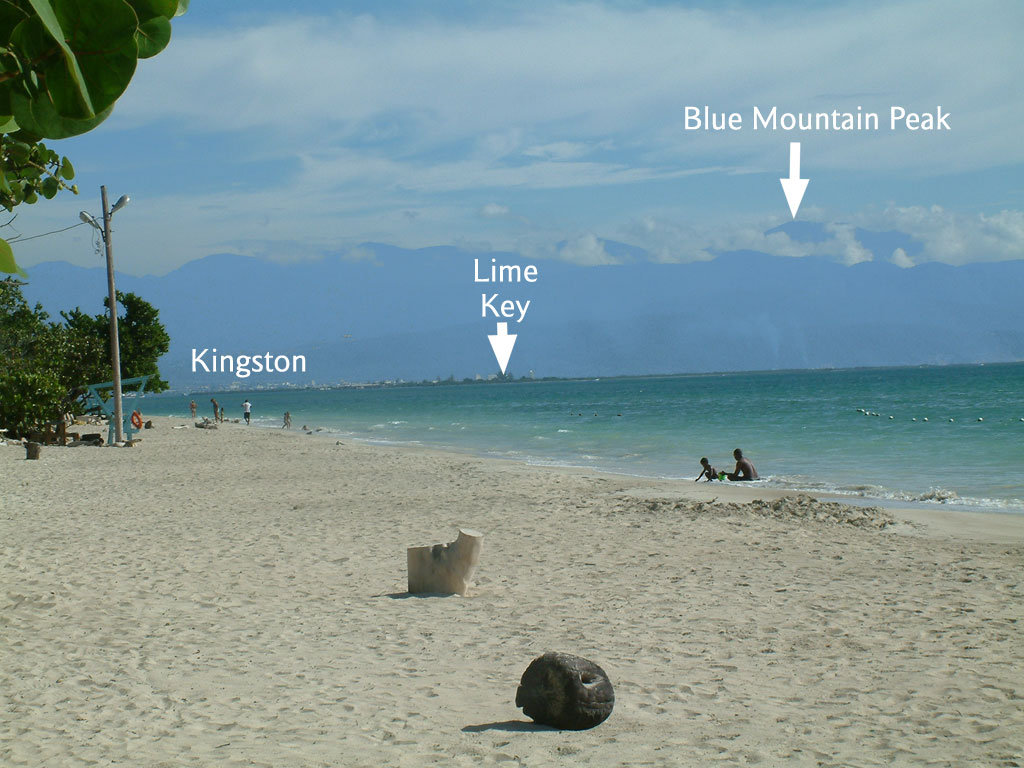
Panoramic view from Hellshire Beach with the Blue Mountain Peak in the distance

Blue Mountain Peak is Jamaica's highest mountain, rising to 2,256 metres (7,402 ft), and is the tallest peak in the Caribbean outside of Hispaniola. It is the home of Blue Mountain coffee. It is located on the border of the Portland and Saint Thomas parishes of Jamaica.

The Blue Mountain Peak is part of the Blue and John Crow Mountains National Park, which became a UNESCO World Heritage Site in 2015.

== Hiking ==
The Blue Mountains are popular for hiking and camping. The traditional Blue Mountain trek is a 7-mile (11 km) hike to the peak and consists of a 3,000-foot (910 m) increase in elevation. Jamaicans prefer to reach the peak at sunrise, thus the 3- to 4-hour hike is usually undertaken in darkness. Since the sky is usually very clear in the mornings, Cuba can be seen in the distance.

There is a park fee to pay to hike on the peak.

== Flora ==
The famous Blue Mountain coffee is grown on the mountain. The small coffee farming communities of Claverty Cottage and Hagley Gap are located near the peak.

Some of the plants found on the Blue Mountain cannot be found anywhere else in the world and they are often of a dwarfed sort. This is mainly due to the cold climate which inhibits growth.

== Birds ==
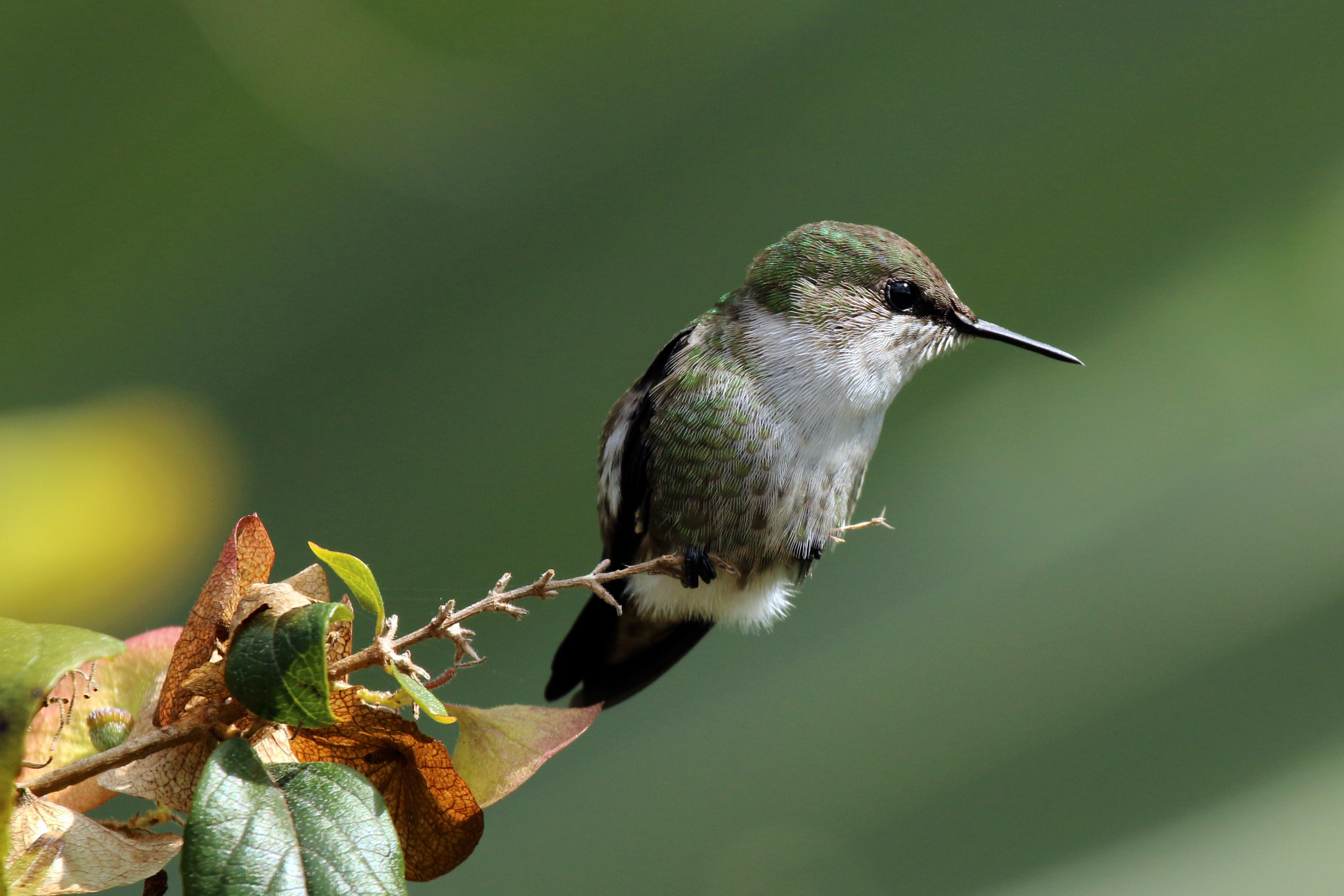
Vervain hummingbird (Mellisuga minima), Strawberry Hill, Jamaica

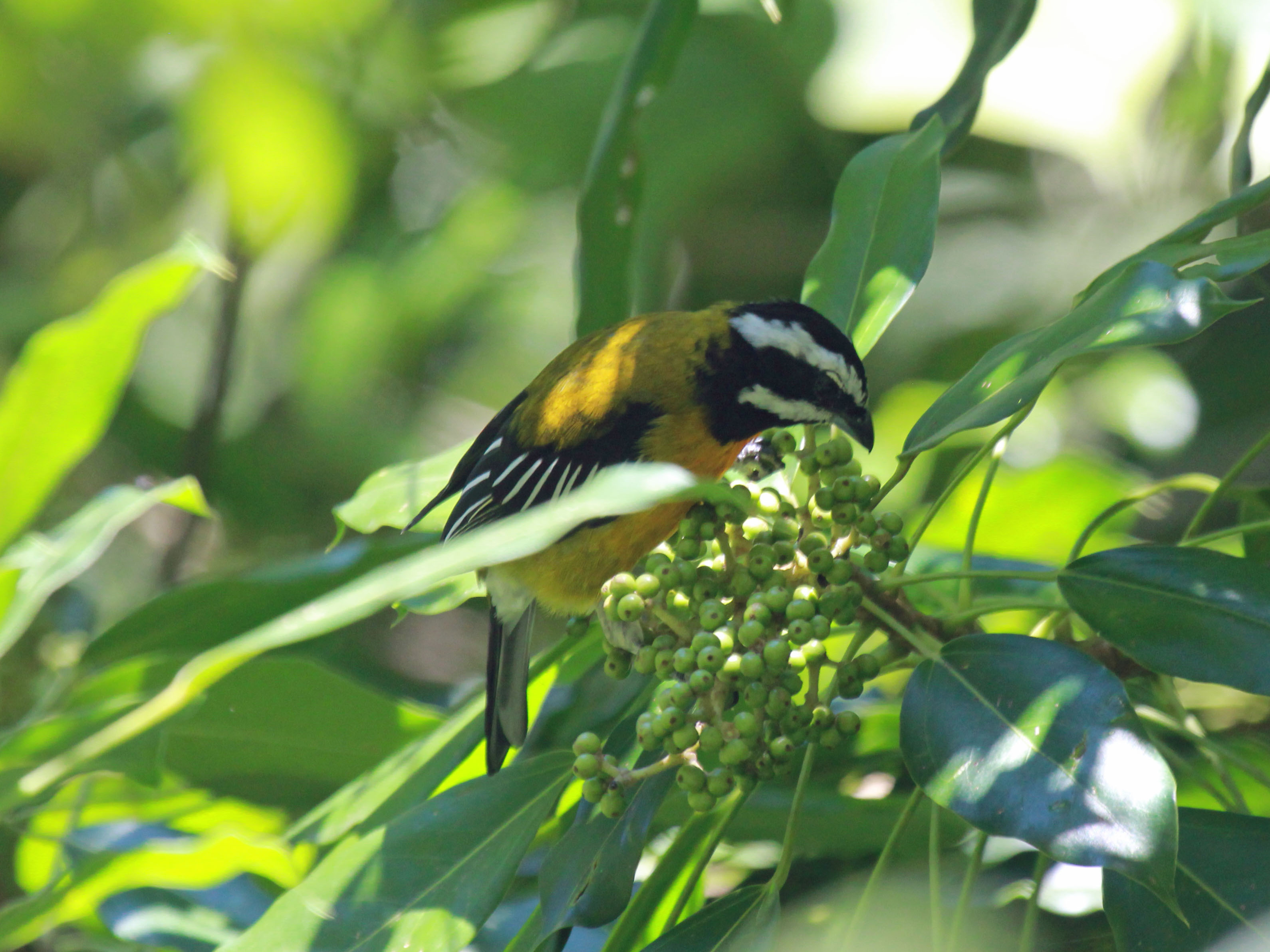
Male Jamaican spindalis (Spindalis nigricephala), Blue Mountains, Jamaica

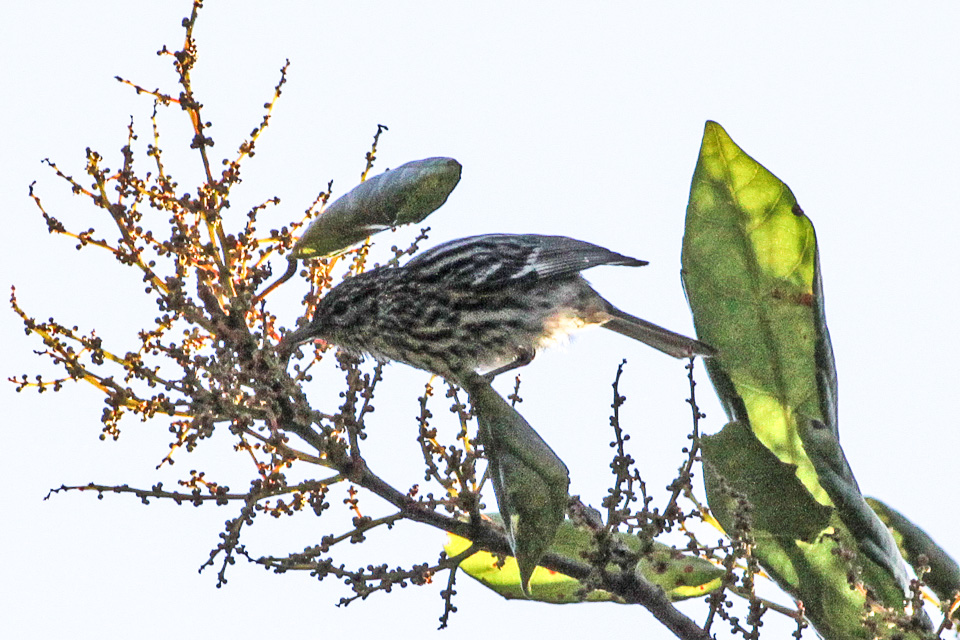
Arrowhead warbler Setophaga pharetra, Blue Mountains, Jamaica.

== See also ==
- List of Ultras of the Caribbean
- List of mountain peaks of the Caribbean
