= Hagley Gap =

Human settlement in Jamaica

Coordinates: 18°01′N 76°37′W

Location of Hagley Gap in Jamaica

Hagley Gap is a settlement in Saint Thomas parish in southeastern Jamaica. It is a farming village, located 16 kilometres (9.9 mi) from Kingston near the top of the Blue Mountains, whose primary source of revenue is Jamaican Blue Mountain Coffee.

Hagley Gap is roughly a 11 kilometres (6.8 mi) hike from the Blue Mountain Peak, which is a destination for hiking and camping enthusiasts. In order to reach the peak at sunrise after the 3 to 5 hour hike, night time hikes are common. The peak has a view of both the north and south coasts of Jamaica.

The Blue Mountain Project (BMP) is a nonprofit organization which has partnered with the community of Hagley Gap. Over the last 12 years, they have built a medical clinic, brought internet access, and improved education in the community, as well as providing job training.
