= Claverty Cottage =

- Village
- Location within Jamaica
- Coordinates: 18.1491°N 76.6382°W
- Country: Jamaica
- Parish: Portland

Claverty Cottage is a small settlement located about 5 miles/8 km from Blue Mountain Peak in the parish of Portland, Jamaica. The population of this settlement is approximately 600 inhabitants. The district is known for its production of one of the most popular coffee brands in the island (Blue Mountain coffee). Over the last several decades, this coffee has developed a reputation that has made it one of the most expensive and highly sought coffees in the world. In addition to its use for brewed coffee, the beans are the flavor base of Tia Maria coffee liqueur.

About 1 km from this district is another small settlement called Clifton Hill, although many consider them to be the same settlement, locals consider them separate districts. In the community there is a primary school, a postal agency and an Anglican church (St. Paul’s - Claverty Cottage), the other church, a church of God is located in the adjacent Clifton Hill. The nearest urban area with a police station is Buff Bay, which is 30 miles away.
