= List of ultras of the Caribbean =

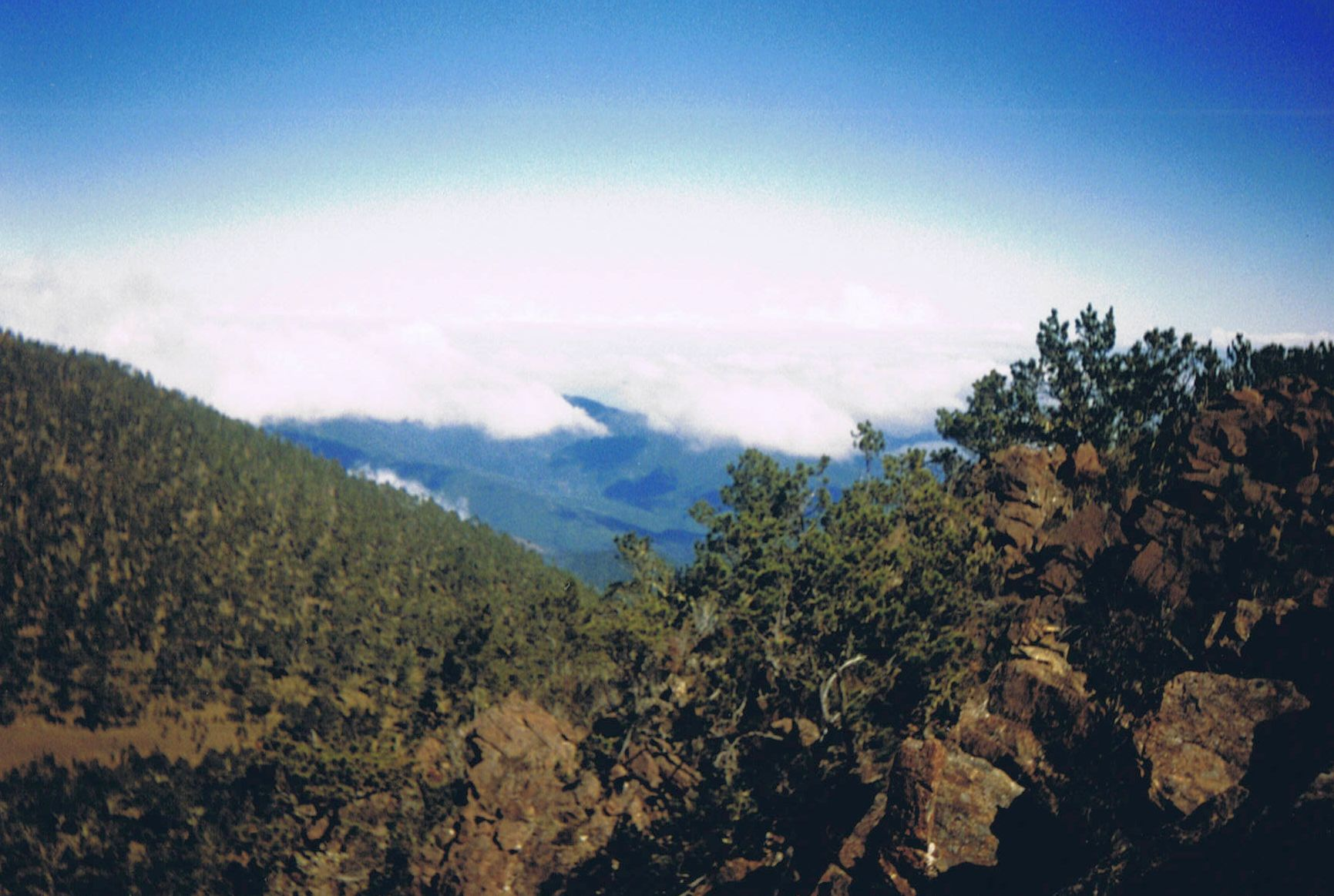
Pico Duarte is the highest summit of the Dominican Republic, the Island of Hispaniola, and the entire Caribbean.

The following sortable table comprises the seven ultra-prominent summits on the islands of the Caribbean Sea. Each of these peaks has at least 1500 meters (4921 feet) of topographic prominence. Five of these peaks rise on the island of Hispaniola (three in the Dominican Republic, and two in Haiti) and one each on Jamaica and Cuba.

Topographic elevation is the vertical distance above the reference geoid, a mathematical model of the Earth's sea level as an equipotential gravitational surface. The topographic prominence of a summit is the elevation difference between that summit and the highest or key col to a higher summit. The topographic isolation of a summit is the minimum great-circle distance to a point of equal elevation.

This article defines a significant summit as a summit with at least 100 meters (328.1 feet) of topographic prominence, and a major summit as a summit with at least 500 meters (1640 feet) of topographic prominence. An ultra-prominent summit is a summit with at least 1500 meters (4921 feet) of topographic prominence.

If an elevation or prominence is calculated as a range of values, the arithmetic mean is shown.

== Ultra-prominent summits ==
Of these seven ultra-prominent summits of the Caribbean, three are located in the Dominican Republic, two in Haiti, and one each in Jamaica and Cuba.

The seven ultra-prominent summits of the Caribbean
Rank	Mountain Peak	Country	Island	Elevation	Prominence	Isolation	Location
1	Pico Duarte (Note: The summit of Pico Duarte is the highest point of the Dominican Republic, the Island of Hispaniola, and all islands of the Caribbean Sea.)	Dominican Republic	Hispaniola	3098 m 10,164 ft	3098 m 10,164 ft	941 km 584 mi	19.0231°N 70.9977°W
2	Pic la Selle (Note: The summit of Pic la Selle is the highest point of the Republic of Haiti.) (Note: Pic la Selle is the southernmost and westernmost summit of its elevation in the Caribbean.)	Haiti	Hispaniola	2674 m 8,773 ft	2644 m 8,675 ft	126.6 km 78.7 mi	18.3602°N 71.9767°W
3	Blue Mountain Peak (Note: The summit of Blue Mountain Peak is the highest point of the island and the nation of Jamaica.) (Note: Blue Mountain Peak is the southernmost and westernmost 2000-meter (6562-foot) summit and ultra-prominent summit of the Caribbean.)	Jamaica	Jamaica	2256 m 7,402 ft	2256 m 7,402 ft	273 km 169.5 mi	18.0465°N 76.5788°W
4	Pic Macaya (Note: Pic Macaya is the westernmost summit of its elevation in the Caribbean.)	Haiti	Hispaniola	2347 m 7,700 ft	2087 m 6,847 ft	216 km 134.5 mi	18.3822°N 74.0243°W
5	Pico Turquino (Note: The summit of Pico Turquino is the highest point of the island and Republic of Cuba.) (Note: Pico Turquino is the northernmost and westernmost ultra-prominent summit of the Caribbean.)	Cuba	Cuba	1974 m 6,476 ft	1974 m 6,476 ft	217 km 134.7 mi	19.9898°N 76.8360°W
6	Loma Gajo en Medio	Dominican Republic	Hispaniola	2279 m 7,477 ft	1779 m 5,837 ft	57.5 km 35.7 mi	18.6292°N 71.5108°W
7	Loma Alto de la Bandera (Note: Loma Alto de la Bandera is the southernmost and easternmost summit of its elevation in the Caribbean.)	Dominican Republic	Hispaniola	2842 m 9,324 ft	1512 m 4,961 ft	43.4 km 27 mi	18.8126°N 70.6268°W

== Gallery ==
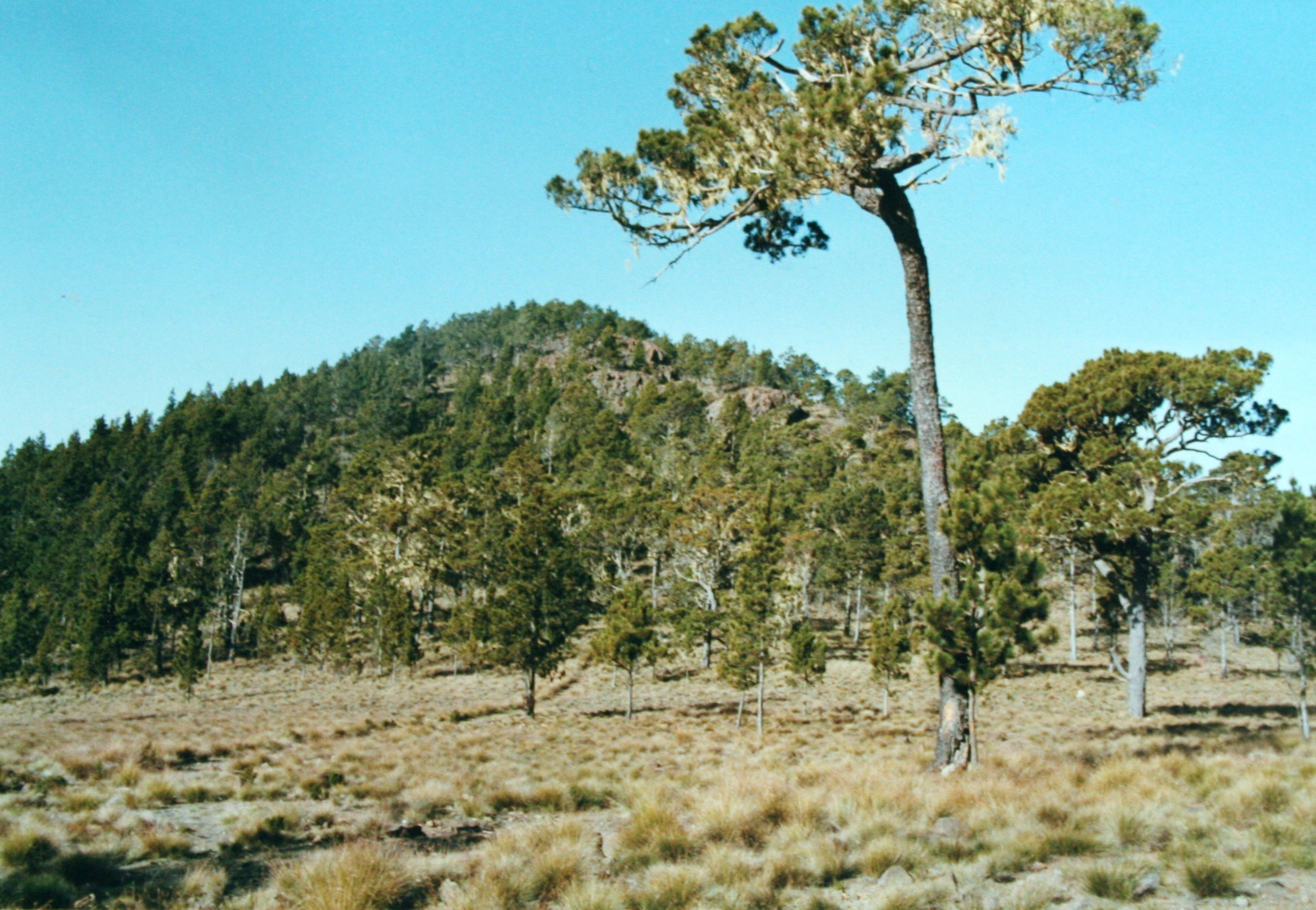
1. Pico Duarte is the highest summit of the Dominican Republic, the Island of Hispaniola, and the entire Caribbean.

== See also ==
- List of mountain peaks of North America
  - List of mountain peaks of Greenland
  - List of mountain peaks of Canada
  - List of mountain peaks of the Rocky Mountains
  - List of mountain peaks of the United States
  - List of mountain peaks of México
  - List of mountain peaks of Central America
  - List of mountain peaks of the Caribbean
    - List of the ultra-prominent summits of the Caribbean
    - List of extreme summits of the Caribbean
- Caribbean
  - Geography of the Caribbean
  - Geology of the Caribbean
    - Category:Mountains of the Caribbean
      - commons:Category:Mountains of the Caribbean
- Physical geography
  - Topography
    - Topographic elevation
    - Topographic prominence
    - Topographic isolation
