= Coffee production in Jamaica =

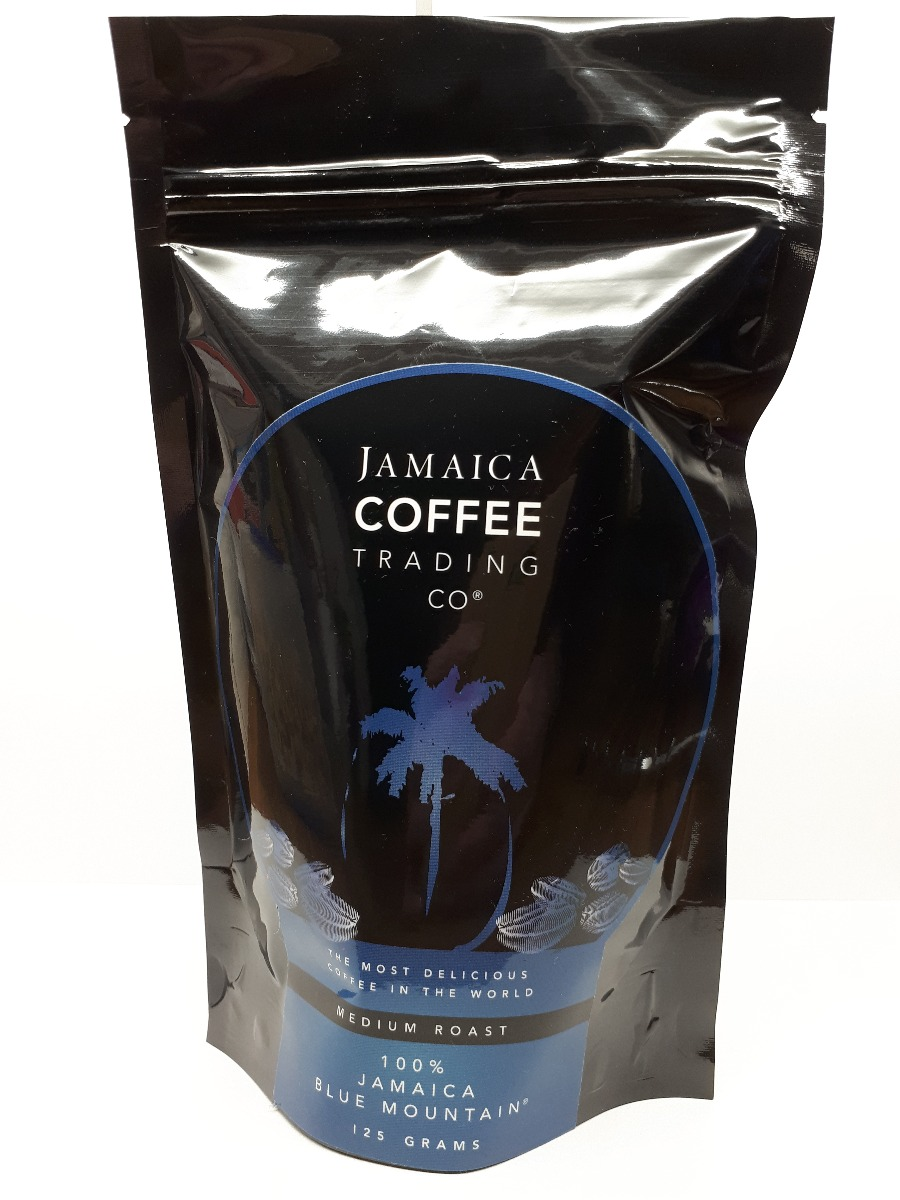
125 Grams of Jamaica Blue Mountain Coffee beans certified by Jamaica Agricultural Commodities Authority.

Coffee production in Jamaica began after 1728, when governor Sir Nicholas Lawes introduced the crop near Castleton, north of Kingston. Jamaican Blue Mountain Coffee is the special variety of coffee that is grown in the Blue Mountains region, which has the most conducive climate and topographical features; this variety is known for its scent and sweet taste. Most of Jamaica's coffee production is grown for export.

== Plantation ==
Most of the coffee grown on the island is a derivative of the Brazilian variety known as Coffea arabica Typica, constituting 70% of the yield, while other varieties grown are hybrid varieties of caturra, geisha, etc. The coffee that is grown in the Blue Mountains region, known as the Jamaican Blue Mountain Coffee, is said to be of very high quality and is mostly exported. Coffee is grown at an elevation of 15–1,603 metres (49–5,259 ft), with a rainfall incidence varying from 125 centimetres (49 in) to more than 700 centimetres (280 in). Farming methods are specifically oriented towards a high rate of production with optimum acidity.

== Regulation ==
The Ministry of Agriculture and its subordinate office, the Jamaica Agricultural Commodities Authority (previously the Coffee Industry Board), are responsible for all activities of the coffee sector. The Coffee Industry Development Company (CIDCO) (was set up by what was then the Coffee Industry Board) assumes direct responsibility for coffee production and also to render assistance to farmers owning 1 hectare (2.5 acres) or more of land dedicated to this crop.

The Coffee Industry Regulation Act specifies what coffee may use the Blue Mountain label, and also restricts the use of the Blue Mountain trademark to production authorised by the Jamaica Agricultural Commodities Authority broadly speaking, coffee harvested from the parishes of Saint Andrew, Saint Thomas, Portland, and Saint Mary may be considered Blue Mountain coffee.

== Production ==
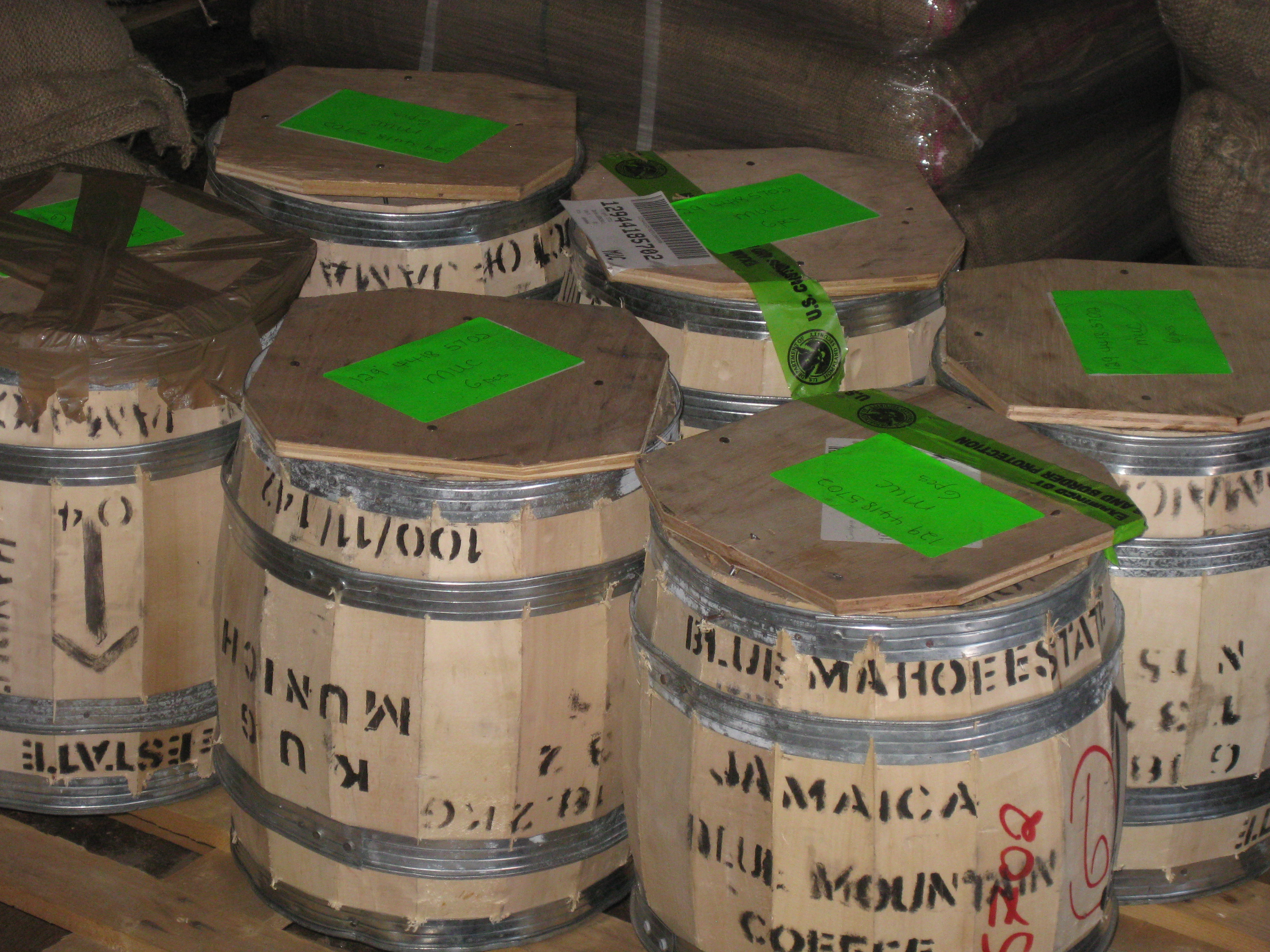
Barrels of Jamaica Blue Mountain Coffee beans

According to FAO statistics for 2013, Jamaican coffee production was 6,984 tons, representing about 0.1% of world production. The coffee was grown in an area of 8,000 hectares (20,000 acres) with a yield rate of 8,730 hectogram per ha. For the period from 1981 to 2013, the lowest production was 958 tons in 1979 and the highest was 15,117 tons in 2007.

Coffee is an export commodity. As it is labour-intensive, it provides employment to a large extent to the rural and urban people of the country right through the stages of production, processing, and sale. Export demand has exceeded production. More than 80 per cent of the production of Jamaican Blue Mountain Coffee is exported to Japan. In 2005, there was a shortfall in this export on account of destruction to the crop resulting from the Hurricane Ivan in the later part of 2004.

== See also ==
- Tia Maria
- Economy of Jamaica
- List of countries by coffee production

== Bibliography ==
- Brathwaite, Chelston W. D. (1981). Urgent Plant Pest And Disease Problems In The Caribbean - Proceedings of the First Meeting of The Society for Plant Protection in the Caribbean held in Kingston, Jamaica from Nov. 22-27, 1981. Ministry of Agriculture, Inter-American Institute for Cooperation on Agriculture.
