= Jamaican Blue Mountain Coffee =

Classification of coffee grown in the Blue Mountains of Jamaica

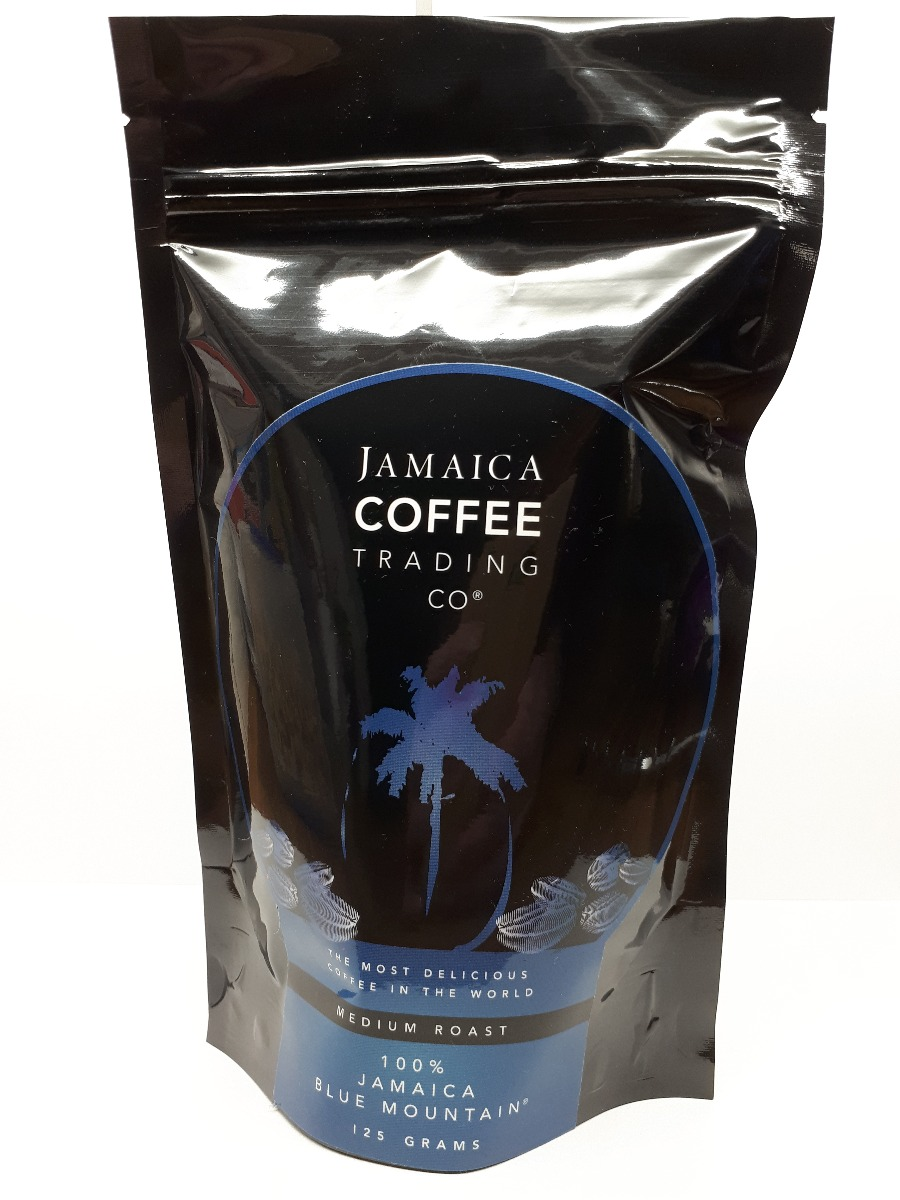
125 grams of Jamaica Blue Mountain Coffee beans certified by Jamaica Agricultural Commodities Authority

Jamaican Blue Mountain Coffee or Jamaica Blue Mountain Coffee is a classification of coffee grown in the Blue Mountains of Jamaica. The coffee was introduced to Jamaica in 1728.

Jamaican Blue Mountain Coffee is an Arabica coffee-bean variety called Typica, which originated in southwestern Ethiopia.

The best lots of Blue Mountain coffee are noted for their mild flavour and lack of bitterness. Over the past few decades, this coffee has developed a reputation that has made it one of the world's most expensive and sought-after coffees. Over 80% of all Jamaican Blue Mountain Coffee is exported to Japan. In addition to their use for brewed coffee, the beans are the flavour base of Tia Maria coffee liqueur.

Jamaican Blue Mountain Coffee is a globally protected certification mark, meaning only coffee certified by the Jamaica Commodities Regulatory Authority (previously the Coffee Industry Board of Jamaica) can be labelled as such. It comes from a recognised growing region in the Blue Mountain region of Jamaica, and the Coffee Industry Board of Jamaica monitors its cultivation.

Generally located between Kingston to the south and Port Antonio to the north, the Blue Mountains are some of the highest mountains in the Caribbean, rising to 2,256 metres (7,402 ft). The region's climate is cool and misty with high rainfall, and the soil is rich with excellent drainage, conditions considered ideal for coffee cultivation.

== The Coffee Industry Regulation Act ==
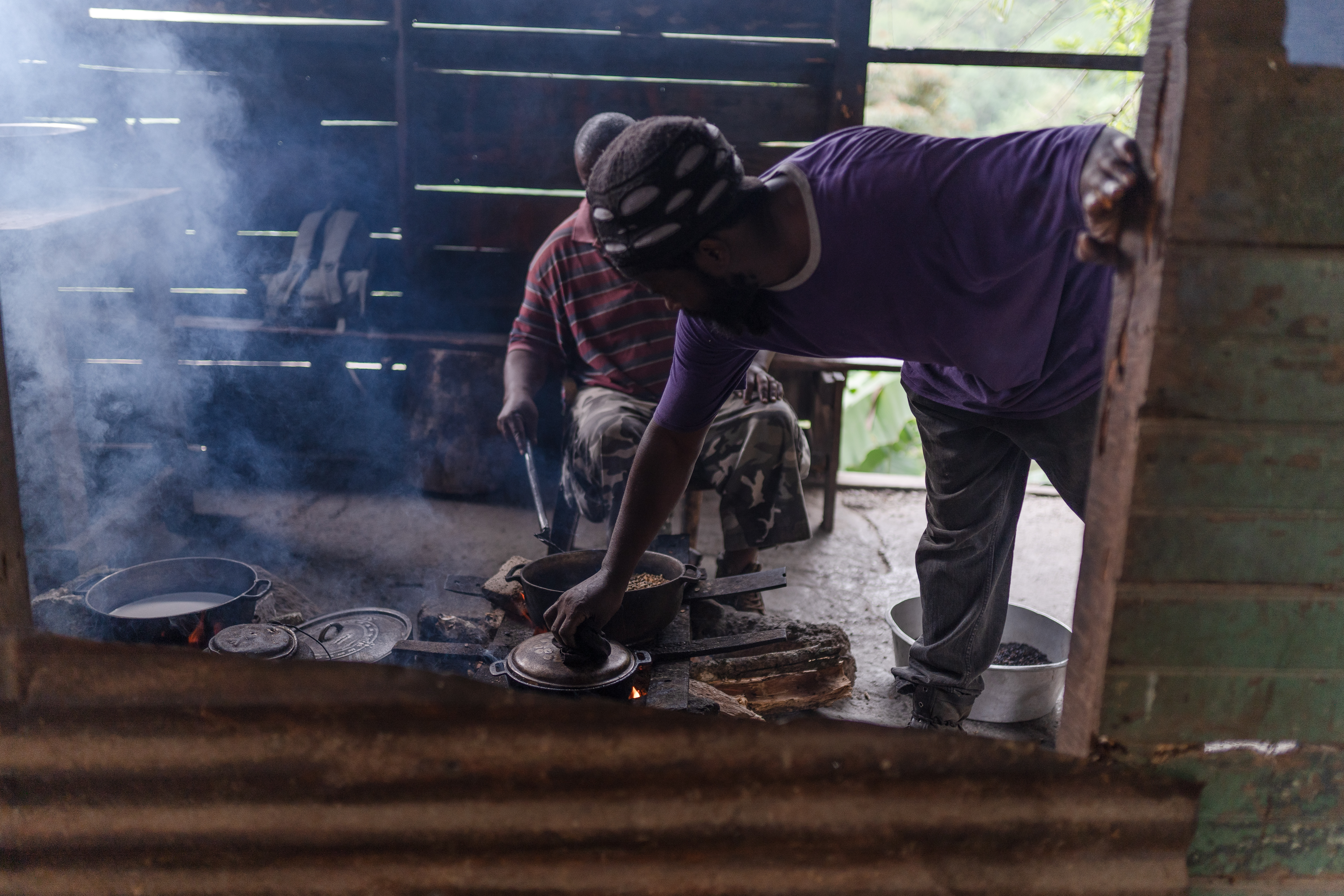
Coffee is roasted in a cast iron skillet at James Dennis' Coffee in Section, Portland Parish, Jamaica.

The Coffee Industry Regulation Act specifies what coffee may use the Blue Mountain label. Additionally, it restricts the use of the Blue Mountain trademark to those authorized by the Jamaica Agricultural Commodities Regulatory Authority (formerly the Coffee Industry Board). Broadly speaking, coffee harvested from the parishes of Saint Andrew, Saint Thomas, Portland and Saint Mary may be considered Blue Mountain coffee.

Traditionally, only coffee grown in the Blue Mountain area can be called Jamaica Blue Mountain. Coffee grown outside of the Blue Mountains at elevations between 460 metres (1,500 ft) and 910 metres (3,000 ft) is called Jamaica High Mountain, and coffee grown below 460 metres (1,500 ft) elevation is called Jamaica Supreme or Jamaica Low Mountain.

Blue Mountain Coffee is registered with the United States Patent and Trademark Office (USPTO) as a certification mark (No. 1,414,598), protected as a community trademark (No. 002093060) in the European Union and as a certification trademark (No. 1222993) with the Intellectual Property Office (IPO) of the United Kingdom. Jamaica Blue Mountain Coffee is registered with the Jamaica Intellectual Property Office as a Geographical Indication.

== Classifications of Blue Mountain Coffee ==
There are generally three types of grades of Jamaica Blue Mountain ranked by size and defects. Number 1 beans are the largest and most desired with the least defects, followed by number 2 and 3 beans. Separately, there are peaberry beans, which are smaller beans that appear shaped like a rugby ball as opposed to the usual flat beans.

As with most other varieties of coffee, there are several grades assigned to different lots based on factors such as size, appearance, and defects allowed.

== Jamaican Blue Mountain Coffee Day ==
In December 2018, the Japanese Government accepted a motion from the Association of Japanese Importers of Jamaican Coffee (AJIJC) to recognize January 9, 2019, as the first Jamaican Blue Mountain Coffee Day. This day is in recognition of January 9, 1967 when 60% of that year's harvest was shipped from the Port of Kingston, Jamaica to Japan. This very large shipment of coffee marked the beginning of a new relationship between Jamaica and Japan after the second world war. To date, Japan continues to be the largest consumer of Jamaican Blue Mountain Coffee.

The Jamaican Blue Mountain Coffee Day includes promotional activities that lead up to the day and is celebrated locally in Jamaica and Japan as well as in large cities around the world such as New York and London and several Jamaican embassies.

== Jamaican Blue Mountain Coffee Festival ==
The inaugural Jamaican Blue Mountain Coffee Festival took place over three days on March 23, 24, and 25 in 2018 at Newcastle in St. Andrew, Jamaica. The following year, it occurred on March 1, 2, 3 in 2019 in the same region. Due to the COVID-19 pandemic the event was canceled in 2020. Organizers switched to a virtual event in 2021 that was offered internationally as a live event on social media. The expanded grand festival took place in-person in 2022 on March 4 and lasted a whole month until April 2.

The festival featured Jamaican Blue Mountain coffee products, promoted vendors, and showcased performers, tours, barista competitions, and food demonstrations for local and international attendees from producers, processors, consumers, and vendors.

The festival offered the opportunity to promote products to tourists, educate current farming producers through a Trade Day, and create opportunities to form matchmaking for buyers, processors, and exporters.

During the festival, workshops, seminars, and networking sessions were offered by the Jamaica Agricultural Commodities Regulatory Authority (JACRA), the Rural Agricultural Development Authority (RADA), and the Tourism Linkages Network (TLN).

== See also ==
- Coffee production in Jamaica
