= Coquí =

Several small frog species native to Puerto Rico

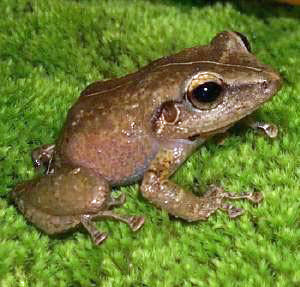
Eleutherodactylus coqui, the most well-known species

Coquí (Spanish: [koˈki]) is a common name for several species of small frogs in the genus Eleutherodactylus, native to Puerto Rico. They are onomatopoeically named for the very loud mating call which the males of two species, the common coqui and the upland coqui, make at night. The coquí is one of the most common frogs in Puerto Rico, with more than 20 different species found within its territory, including 13 in El Yunque National Forest. Fossil and genetic evidence supports coquís having inhabited Puerto Rico for more than 30 million years. Other species of this genus can be found in the rest of the Caribbean and elsewhere in the Neotropics, in Central and South America. The coquí is an unofficial national symbol of Puerto Rico; there is a Puerto Rican expression that goes, "Soy de aquí, como el coquí", which translates to "I'm from here, like the coquí."

== Characteristics ==
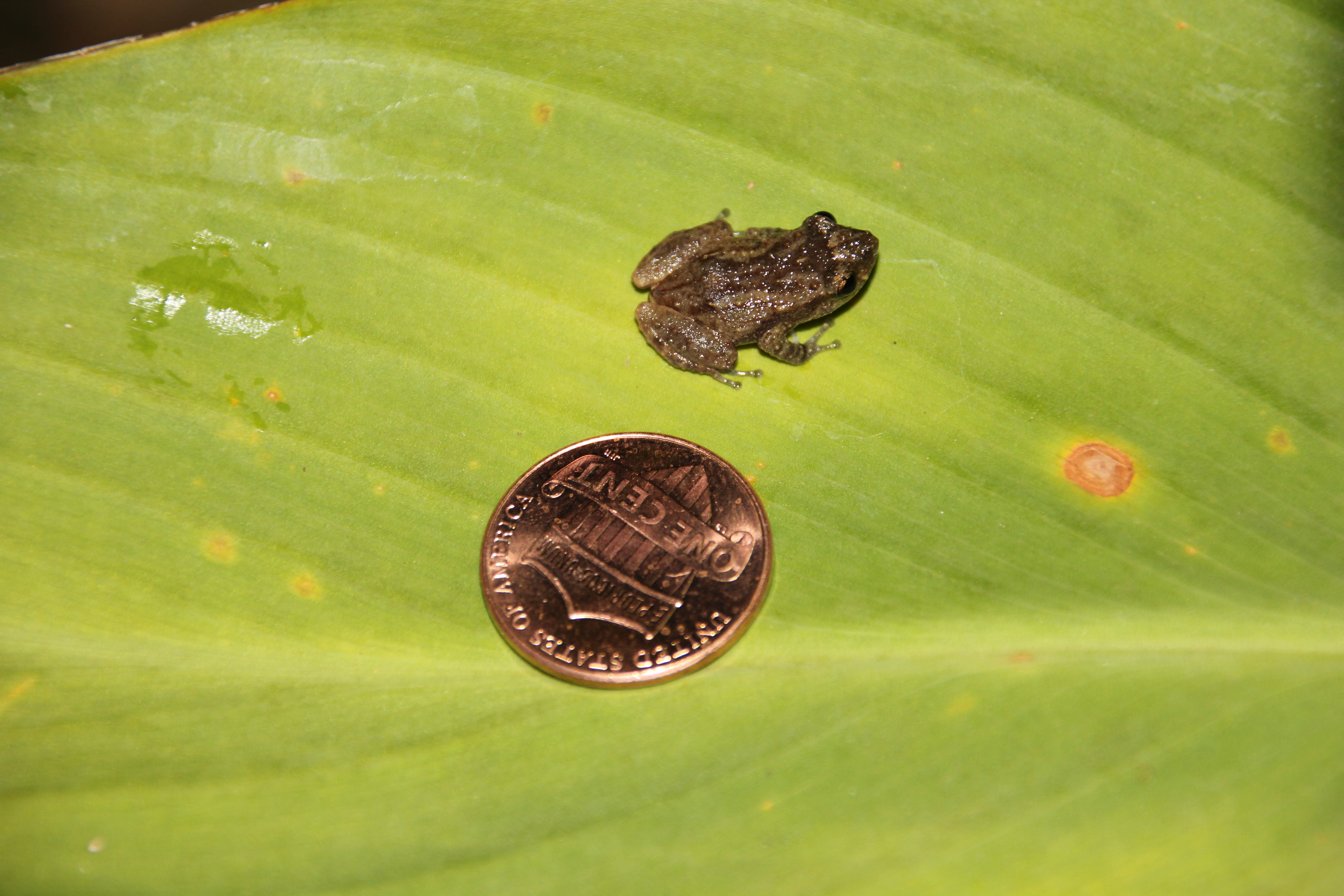
A coquí on a leaf with penny for size comparison

Eleutherodactylus spp. are small tree frogs that can vary in color. These frogs can be a mixture of brown, yellow, green; and gray on the top and either white or yellow on the bottom side of their body. The eye color is a variation of brown and gold. They can range in size from 15–80 millimetres (0.59–3.15 in). The first word of the species' scientific classification is the genus name Eleutherodactylus which is Ancient Greek and Modern Greek for "free toes", referring to the fact that this species has no webbing in between its toes. The coquí have special disks instead of webbing on their feet, differentiating them from many other types of frogs. These disks help the coquí climb and stick to trees and leaves.

== Habitat ==
Coquís live in tropical areas and have been discovered in different elevation levels. They can be found at up to 1200m in elevation, usually in humid mountain forests or in dry forests. According to the Invasive Species Compendium, the Eleutherodactylus coquí shares the nests of common native species of birds like the "bananaquit (Coereba flaveola portoricensis), the Puerto Rican bullfinch (Loxigilla portoricensis), and the Puerto Rican tody (Todus mexicanus)". Coquís tend to be in their natural habitats in the forests but it is also common for the species to appear in human territories such as houses, parks, and near bodies of water.

== Taxonomy ==
Coquís belong to the Eleutherodactylus genus which in Greek means "free toes". Eleutherodactylus contains over 200 species that naturally occur in the southern United States, Central America, South America, and the Caribbean. All coquís are classified within the E. auriculatus group, a species complex that includes numerous species from throughout the Caribbean. A fossil Eleutherodactylus bone is known from the Early Oligocene-aged San Sebastián Limestone of Puerto Rico, suggesting that coquis have been present on the island for more than 29 million years. They likely arrived to Puerto Rico earlier in the Oligocene, around 33.9 million years ago, alongside many other vertebrate taxa.

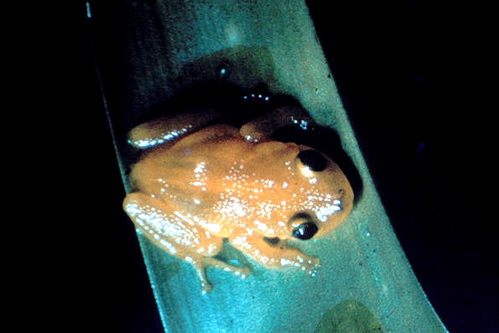
The large E. karlschmidti (top) and the viviparous E. jasperi (bottom) are both feared extinct.

Seventeen described species of frogs named "coquí" inhabit Puerto Rico and neighboring islands. The following species are known:

- Genus Eleutherodactylus Duméril and Bibron, 1841
  - Eleutherodactylus antillensis (Reinhardt and Lütken, 1863) (red-eyed coquí)
  - Eleutherodactylus brittoni Schmidt, 1920 (grass coquí)
  - Eleutherodactylus cochranae Grant, 1932 (whistling coquí)
  - Eleutherodactylus cooki Grant, 1932 (rock coquí or guajón frog)
  - Eleutherodactylus coqui Thomas, 1966 (common coquí)
  - Eleutherodactylus eneidae Rivero, 1959 (Eneida's coquí)
  - Eleutherodactylus gryllus Schmidt, 1920 (cricket coquí)
  - Eleutherodactylus hedricki Rivero, 1963 (Hedrick's coquí)
  - Eleutherodactylus jasperi Drewry & Jones, 1976 (golden coquí, likely extinct)
  - Eleutherodactylus juanariveroi Ríos-Lopez & Thomas, 2007 (coquí llanero)
  - Eleutherodactylus karlschmidti Grant, 1931 (web-footed coquí, likely extinct)
  - Eleutherodactylus locustus Schmidt, 1920 (locust coquí)
  - Eleutherodactylus monensis (Meerwarth, 1901) (Mona coquí)
  - Eleutherodactylus portoricensis Schmidt, 1927 (upland coquí)
  - Eleutherodactylus richmondi Stejneger, 1904 (bronze coquí)
  - Eleutherodactylus unicolor Stejneger, 1904 (dwarf coquí)
  - Eleutherodactylus schwartzi Thomas, 1966 (Virgin Islands coquí)
  - Eleutherodactylus wightmanae Schmidt, 1920 (Melodius coquí)

Although some members such as E. antillensis, E. brittoni, E. coqui and E. cochranae are common and widespread, the majority of coquís have small ranges, and have become highly endangered due to habitat loss, invasive species, climate change, and chytrid fungus.

== Reproduction ==
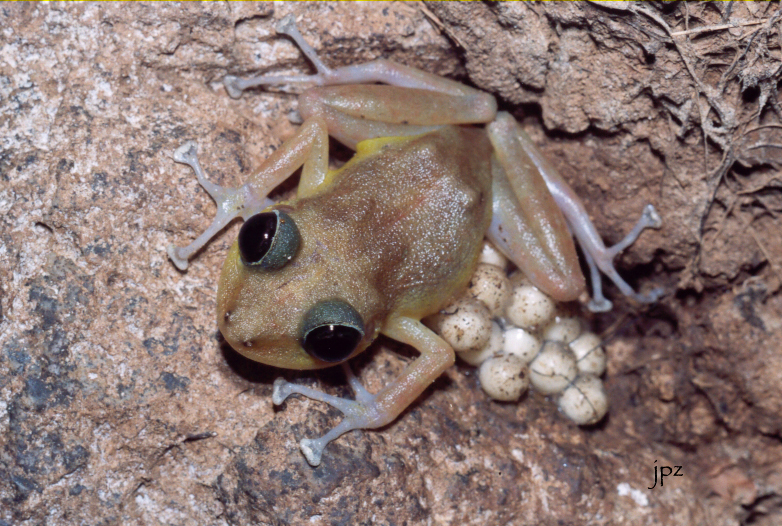
The guajón frog relies on rocky habitats to breed.

Although coquís can reproduce all year long, their breeding is at its peak during the wet season, which is around April to October. Female frogs tend to lay about 15 to 40 eggs roughly five times a year. Coquís differ from most other frog species because coquís lay their eggs in terrestrial plants, whereas other frog species usually lay their eggs in water. The males gather up the eggs and provide protection in a nest, guarding them. Because the eggs must remain moist, male coquís will periodically leave the nest to collect moisture to keep the eggs hydrated when it appears they are beginning to dry out.

=== The coquís' call ===
The coquí frog gets its name from the mating call of the male, which sounds like coquí, or "co-kee". Male coquí frogs use their call to attract female frogs and establish their territory. When multiple male coquís are found in the same area, they challenge each other's domain by song. The coquí frog that loses usually flees and tends to relocate to another area or compete for territory elsewhere. Male coquís start singing around the time the sun sets and continue throughout the night, until dawn.

== Life cycle stages ==
The coquís and their fellow members of the Eleutherodactylus genus have an unusual life cycle shared by only a few other frog genera (e.g. Myobatrachus). While most frogs begin their lives as tadpoles (complete with a small tail that aids the juvenile frog in swimming before they develop legs), the coquís are hatched as tiny frogs with short tails, thereby entirely skipping the free-living larval stage. This life cycle, in which the tadpole stage is completed within the egg itself, is referred to as direct development.

Once they reach their adult stage, most coquís do not live longer than a year, although the National Wildlife Federation states that some coquís have been found to be as old as six years.

== Hurricanes ==
The environmental degradation caused by Hurricane Hugo in 1989, Hurricane Georges in 1998, and the two-year drought from 2015 to 2017 have all had a massive impact on the 28,000-acre (110 km^{2}) El Yunque rain forest in Puerto Rico, including the resident coqui frogs. An increase in average temperature has already increased the incidence in coqui frogs of Batrachochytrium dendrobatidis, a chytrid fungus that reduces the reproductive capability and increases mortality of the Coqui frogs.

The more recent hurricanes Irma and Maria in 2017 also hit Puerto Rico. Irma did not directly strike Puerto Rico, but Maria impacted Puerto Rico directly two weeks later, and devastated the forest on a massive level. Specific conditions prevented some sites from massive destruction, but 53% of the Puerto Rican El Yunque rainforest was devastated.

== Geographic distribution / invasive species ==
By 2009, the USGS established that the species had been identified in Puerto Rico, Hawaii, St. Croix, St. John, St. Thomas, Florida, and the Dominican Republic.

Coquís have become established on the Big Island of Hawaiʻi, where they are considered an invasive species. The coquí population density in Hawaii can reach 20,000 animals per acre, affecting 50,000 acres (20,000 ha). Eradication campaigns are underway on Hawaiʻi and Maui. Regardless of these ongoing campaigns, the U.S. Environmental Protection Agency and U.S. Fish and Wildlife Service have declared and maintained that many species of Coqui are endangered/critically endangered, and any person who intentionally harms these species and/or their eggs is subject to penalties under federal law. Popular Puerto Rican singer Bad Bunny shared a cryptic post on social media in response to the efforts of local extermination of the Coqui, discouraging the harmful treatment of the frogs.

The Eleutherodactylus coqui was introduced to Hawaii around the late 1980s. This species found its way to the Hawaiian Islands by hiding in plants that were being transported to the islands. Studies have shown that the species has increased nutrient cycling rates, and actually helped some native species which previously existed in low-nutrient conditions.

Eleutherodactylus coqui attains extremely high densities in Hawaiʻi and can reproduce year-round, once every 1–2 months, and become reproductive around 8–9 months

The coquís have a very small number of predators (rats and some lizards); as a result, the coquí population has increased over time. Another factor in the population increase is that they can breed continuously throughout the year. As a result, the Eleutherodactylus coquí has had a negative impact on native species by increasing competition with native birds, and other frogs. The expansion of the Eleutherodactylus coquí has forced other creatures such as bats to seek alternatives, as they compete for food at higher elevations. Birds and bats were not greatly affected by the introduction of coquís to the island until the frogs started appearing on higher ground. The species is also feeding on native spiders and insects that are close to extinction.

Coquís have been officially listed as an invasive species of concern in Colombia. The species has also been found in California, mostly in plant nurseries, though as of 2014 had not been known to have established a stable population.

== Population control ==
Overall, attempts to limit or control the coquí population where they are invasive have been unsuccessful. In Hawaii, the intentional transportation of frogs is a class C felony, and coquís are labeled as pests.

One action that appears to be effective in decreasing the coquí population in commercial areas is a hot shower treatment on nursery plants. The hot shower works as a dis-infestation treatment for not only the Eleutherodactylus coquí eggs but also for adult coquís.

Only a few chemical treatments are legal. Citric acid can be legally used in Hawaii, though the chemical must directly contact coquís, perhaps even multiple times. However, the citric acid may adversely impact plants and cause unseemly spots. Other substances that are used to control the species are hydrated lime and caffeine. Eradication techniques include hand-capture, and spraying with a 12% solution of citric acid, along with a certification program for nurseries to prevent them from acting as centers of contagion.

== The coquí in Puerto Rico ==
=== The coquí and the Taino people ===
The Taino coquí symbol

==== The coquí symbol ====
Researchers have found petroglyphic images of coquí, including in a cave on Puerto Rico's Mona Island, filled with 13th-century petroglyphs depicting Taíno culture. With these images, archaeologists were able to understand certain aspects of their way of life, including customs, art, and beliefs. The repeated coquí symbol suggests the influence of the coquí on art, poetry, and decorative works such as pottery in Taino society.

In these carvings, the positioning of frog-like hands represented "femaleness". In addition, coquí frogs, with their rich vocals before a rain, were said to be associated with women's fertility and children.

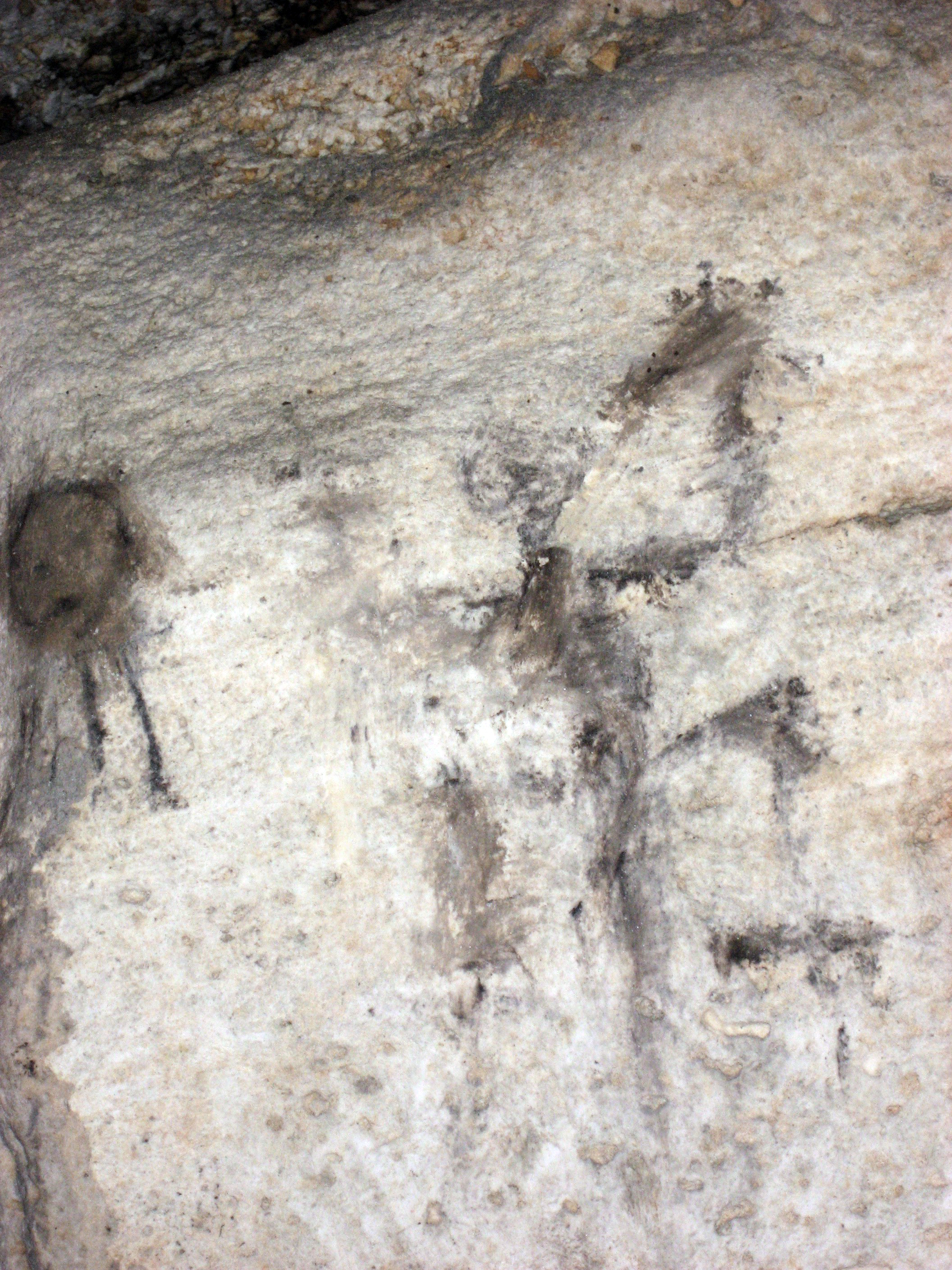
Taino coquí symbol in a Puerto Rican cave

==== The Taino frog legend ====
In one legend about the origin of the coquí, a goddess fell in love with Coquí, the chief's son. She told him that she would come one evening, but she never came. Instead, the evil Juracán, the deity of chaos and disorder, arrived. The sky blackened as the winds quickened. The goddess tried to protect her lover, but Juracán grabbed him away and they never saw each other again. In order to cope with the loss of Coquí, she created a frog that will forever call out his name: "Co-kee! Co-kee!".

Another legend states that a god named Guahoyona abducted all women from the island, leaving the men to take care of the children, who out of hunger began to cry "toa toa", or "mother-mother". When the children could not be consoled by the men, they turned into frogs.

There is another Taíno tale that reflects the importance of the Coquí to Puerto Rican culture. Throughout the tale, the small frog becomes a source of the island's first music. This continues to be relevant today, as stories are told about the “coqui, coqui” sound in the dead of night. Even in places other than Puerto Rico, the Coquí frog carries deep emotional significance, often triggering immense nostalgia and cultural identity for those who hear it in a song or video.

=== In popular culture ===
Puerto Rican boy-band Menudo have a song named "Coqui", which they sang in their movie Una Aventura Llamada Menudo, in a scene where coquis can be heard.

The sound of a coqui can be heard distinctly at the beginning and end of the songs "Acércate" and "Ángel Caído", by singer Ivy Queen.

In the first movement of The Mars Volta's song "Miranda That Ghost Just Isn't Holy Anymore", 4 minutes of coqui frogs can be heard singing (credited as "The Coqui of Puerto Rico" on the album sleeve).

Many Puerto Rican people choose the Taino Coqui symbol as a tattoo design because of the frog's cultural importance.

=== The coquí and climate change ===
A study published by the Proceedings of the Royal Society B states that long-term temperature rises from climate change have resulted in alterations to the coquí's calls: significant increases in pitch, and shortening of their duration. The increasing temperatures have also been shown to reduce their body size, while also reducing biomass population. This can lead to dire consequences because coquí frogs play an important role in the Puerto Rican ecosystem.

If temperature continues to increase, coquís as a whole are predicted to sound and look different in the next century. The survival of the coquís depends on the female coquí's ability to adapt to these changes. If their inner ears are not able to adapt, then they will not be able to pick up higher-pitched calls, leading to mating issues. In addition to coquí populations decreasing, having smaller coquís to eat or be eaten by other organisms may destabilize the whole food web of Puerto Rico's rainforest.

== See also ==
- Common coquí
- Fauna of Puerto Rico
- List of amphibians and reptiles of Puerto Rico
