= List of fauna of Toro Negro State Forest =

Fauna species present at Toro Negro State Forest in Ponce, Puerto Rico

The following are fauna species present at Toro Negro State Forest in Ponce, Puerto Rico.

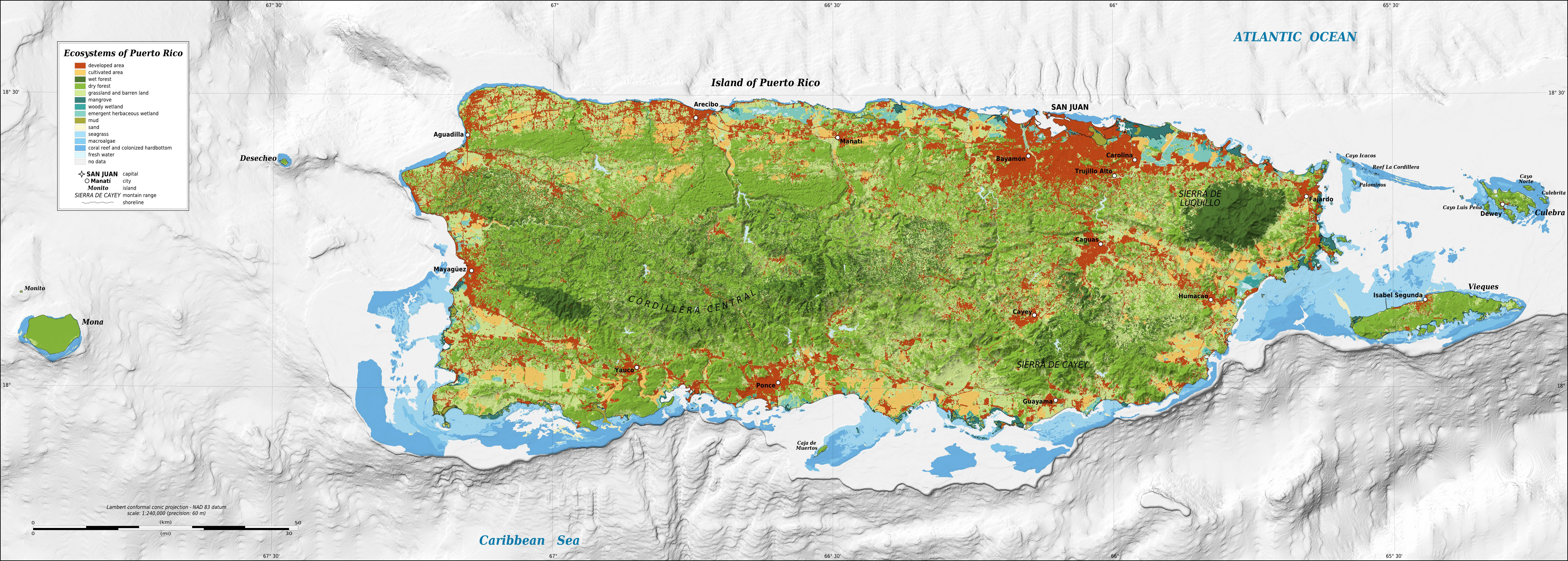
Map of the ecosystems of Puerto Rico

- Agonostomus monticola
- Ameiva exsul
- Amphisbaena caeca
- Anolis cuvieri
- Antillean ghost-faced bat
- Atya lanipes
- Puerto Rican boa
- Borikenophis portoricensis
- Cane toad
- Common coquí
- Eleutherodactylus portoricensis
- Dwarf anole
- Eleutherodactylus hedricki (Hedrick's coquí)
- Greater bulldog bat
- Puerto Rican amazon
- Puerto Rican broad-winged hawk
- Puerto Rican sharp-shinned hawk
- Sicydium plumieri
- Small Asian mongoose
- Sooty mustached bat
