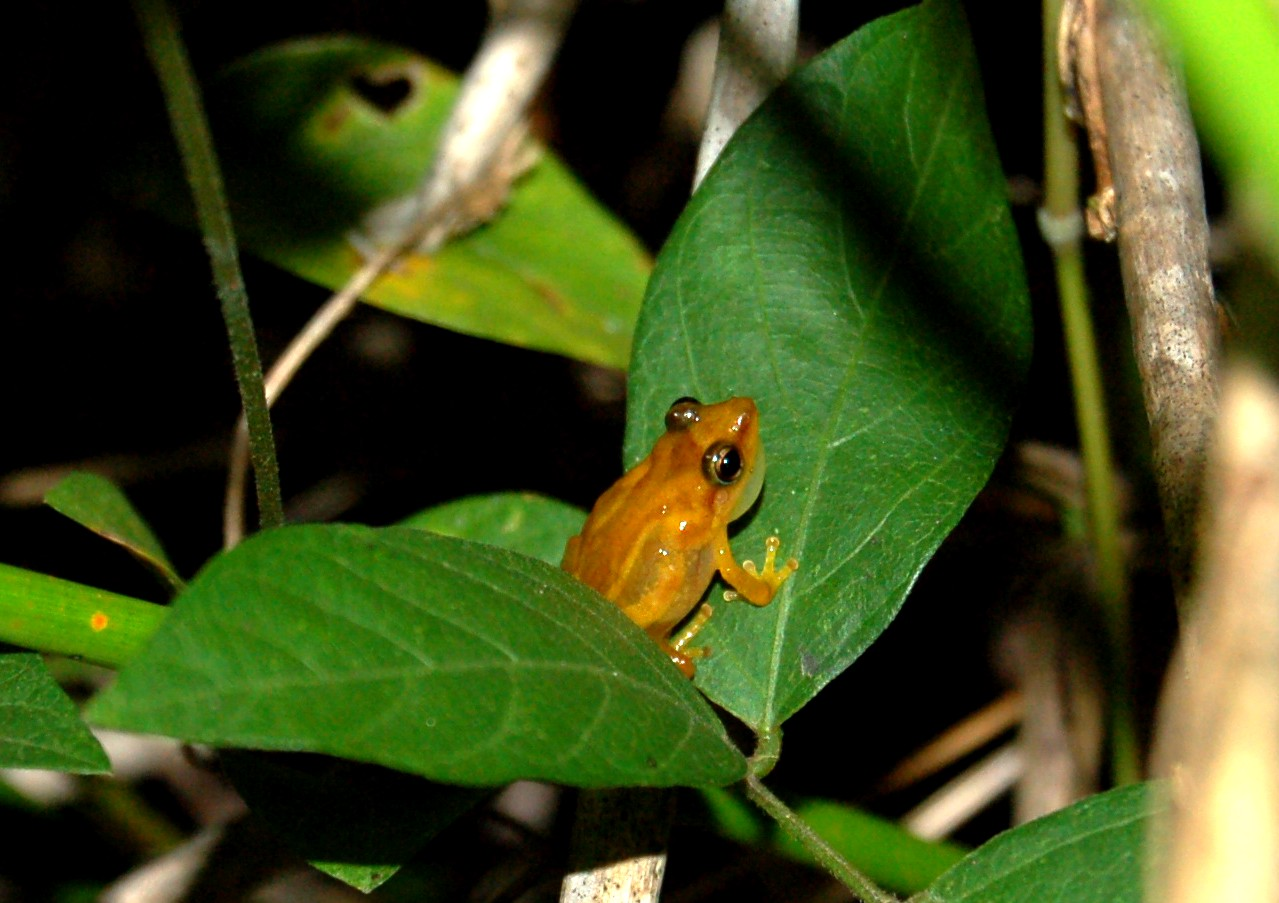

Conservation status
- Critically Endangered (IUCN 3.1)

Scientific classification
- Kingdom: Animalia
- Phylum: Chordata
- Class: Amphibia
- Order: Anura
- Family: Eleutherodactylidae
- Genus: Eleutherodactylus
- Subgenus: Eleutherodactylus
- Species: E. juanariveroi

Binomial name
- Eleutherodactylus juanariveroi Ríos-López and Thomas, 2007

= Puerto Rican wetland frog =

Species of amphibian

Eleutherodactylus juanariveroi, the Plains coquí or Puerto Rican wetland frog (Spanish: coquí llanero), is an endangered species of coquí, a frog species, endemic to Puerto Rico. It was discovered in 2005 by Neftalí Ríos-López, and was named after Puerto Rican herpetologist Juan A. Rivero, in honor of his contributions to Puerto Rican herpetology.

== Distribution and habitat ==
It is only found in the old Naval Base of Sábana Seca in Toa Baja, Puerto Rico.

It inhabits palustrine wetland that is seasonally flooded with fresh water. Males perch on ferns to call for mates, and the species exclusively uses Sagittaria lancifolia, the bulltongue arrowhead, to lay egg clutches. This reliance on one plant make the coquí llanero very specialized in its habitat requirements.

Historically, its range may have been larger, but a large majority of coastal wetlands were drained and converted to agriculture since Spanish colonization in the 1500s, and to urban development since the early 1900s. The coquí's current habitat may have been preserved because the land was occupied by the U.S. military and access to the site was restricted.

== Description ==
The frog is the smallest of its genus in Puerto Rico, with a snout-to-vent length of 14.7 millimetres (0.58 in) in males and 15.8 millimetres (0.62 in) in females. It has extensive dorsal skin glands. The prominent nares (nostrils) have a ridge that connects behind the snout tip, giving the nose a squared-off appearance. Its dorsal coloring is yellow to yellowish-brown, with a light, longitudinal comma mark on each side, and the ventral side is unpigmented or has light stippling.

Its call is a series of short, high-pitched notes.

The species resembles the cricket coquí, but has differences in size, coloration, call structure and frequency, and habitat.

== Ecology ==
Coquí llanero have greater population densities during the rainy season from May to November, compared to drier months of February to April. The species' reproduction is uniquely correlated to rainfall: it produces egg clutches most often during periods of higher rainfall.

They lay clutches of 1-5 eggs on leaf axils of S. lancifolia, and males may produce multiple clutches with different females. The eggs have a thick jelly coat, which may serve to protect them from dehydration, predators, or microbial/fungal growth. This jelly coat as well as complete lack of parental care are unique attributes of the species compared to other Puerto Rican coquí. The eggs may be preyed upon by ants, slugs, and other invertebrates. A study observed hatchlings staying close to the eggs for 3 days to absorb the remaining yolk reserve before dispersing.

== Conservation ==
The Department of Natural Resources of Puerto Rico added this species to the endangered species list, and designated its critical habitat likewise. However, the protection was removed by the Puerto Rico Supreme Court on 12 June 2012. The species is listed as endangered under the Endangered Species Act.
