= Sex differences in sensory systems =

An organism is said to be sexually dimorphic when male and female conspecifics have anatomical differences in features such as body size, coloration, or ornamentation, but disregarding differences of reproductive organs. Sexual dimorphism is usually a product of sexual selection, with female choice leading to elaborate male ornamentation (e.g., tails of male peacocks) and male-male competition leading to the development of competitive weaponry (e.g., antlers on male moose). However, evolutionary selection also acts on the sensory systems that receivers use to perceive external stimuli. If the benefits of perception to one sex or the other are different, sex differences in sensory systems can arise. For example, female production of signals used to attract mates can put selective pressure on males to improve their ability to detect those signals. As a result, only males of this species will evolve specialized mechanisms to aid in detection of the female signal. This article uses examples of sex differences in the olfactory, visual, and auditory systems of various organisms to show how sex differences in sensory systems arise when it benefits one sex and not the other to have enhanced perception of certain external stimuli. In each case, the form of the sex difference reflects the function it serves in terms of enhanced reproductive success.

== Sphinx moth olfactory system ==
Male sphinx moths, Manduca sexta, rely on female released sex-pheromones to guide typical zig-zagging flight behaviors used to locate mates. Although both males and females respond to host plant olfactory cues to locate food sources, detection of and response to sex-pheromones appears to be male specific. Males that are better at detecting female sex-pheromones are able to find signaling females faster, providing them with a reproductive advantage. Since females gain no such advantage for having olfactory systems that are more sensitive to pheromones, enhanced pheromone detection has evolved only in the olfactory system of male M. sexta. The three main sex differences are as follows:

1) Male antennae are enlarged and contain elongated sensilla (sensory organules) not present in females. The pheromone elicits a male response by stimulating male specific receptor cells on a large number of these sensilla, which are located on the antennal flagellum. The sexually dimorphic sensilla are called male specific type-1 trichoid sensilla, a type of hair-like olfactory sensilla. In contrast, the flagella of female antennae lack these trichoid sensilla projections that make the male antennae appear to be larger and more feather-like. Each trichoid sensilla is innervated by two male specific olfactory receptor cells, with each cell being tuned (most sensitive) to one of two major chemical components of the pheromone. By evolving larger, pheromone-specific receptors in the peripheral olfactory system, male M. sexta have an improved sensitivity to female pheromones that enhances mate detection.

2) There is also a sex difference in the neural basis of pheromone detection. In a number of insect species, first order olfactory processing centers in the neuropil of the antennal lobe contain a structure called the macroglomerulus in males. Such a structure, called the macroglomerular complex in this species, has been identified in the antennal lobe of M. sexta, and it has been discovered that axons from the male specific olfactory receptor cells found in trichoid sensilla project exclusively to the macroglomerular complex. Further, all the antennal lobe neurons which respond to sex pheromone also have arborizations to the macroglomerular complex, providing more evidence that it plays a key role in the processing of pheromone sensory information in males.

3) Lastly, there is evidence that the male antennal lobe contains male-specific macroglomerular complex projection neurons that relay pheromone information to higher brain structures in the protocerebrum. Since males have significantly larger populations of medial group antennal lobe neurons, it is thought that some of these extra neurons may belong to this male-specific class. Kanzaki et al. have since characterized the responses and structures of some of these projection neurons, and have found that projection neurons with dendritic arborizations in the macroglomerular complex and ordinary glomeruli were excited or inhibited by different stimuli (pheromonal vs. non-pheromonal stimuli respectively). These selective response properties indicate that a specialized role in relaying pheromone information is likely.

The male-specific features listed above, found at the levels of primary detection and neural processing in M. sexta, demonstrate how males of this species have evolved sex differences in the sensory system that improve their ability to detect and locate females.

== Visual system of flies ==
Sex differences in the visual system of flies are extremely common, with males generally possessing specialized eye features. Flies in the family Bibionidae display a particularly notable dimorphism, with males possessing large dorsal eyes that are absent in females.

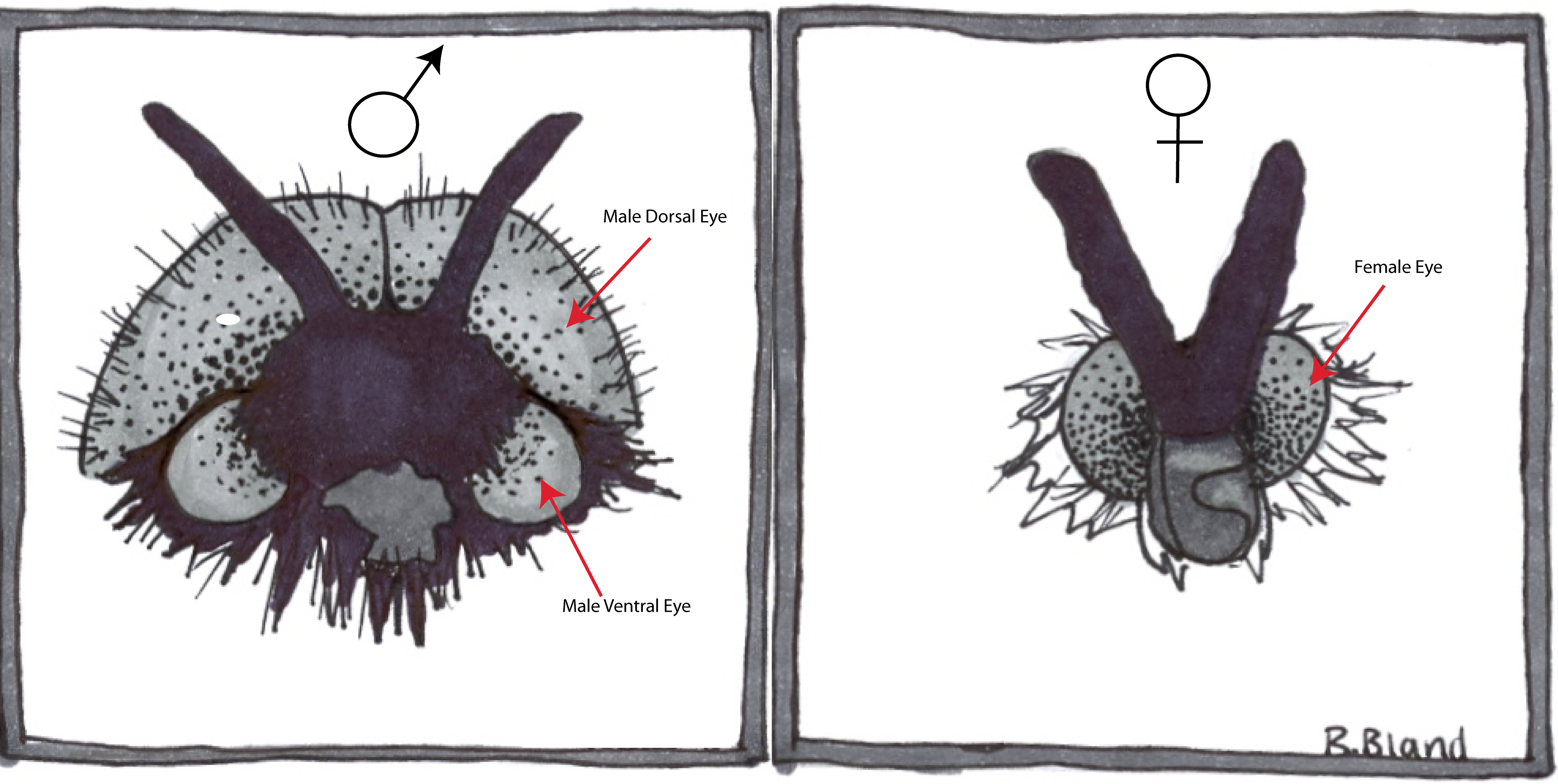
The sexual dimorphism in Bibionidae eyes is prominent, with the large dorsal eyes of the male (left) entirely absent in the female (right)

Female eyes and the ventral eyes of males are very similar, however, suggesting that the male dorsal eyes serve some extra sex specific function. Research on visually guided behavior in flies suggests that male dorsal eyes may be specialized for the detection and capture of females, for which there is a great deal of competition among males. Work by Jochen Zeil during the 1970s and 80's demonstrated that the dorsal eyes of Bibionids are functionally adapted to mate detection during high speed female chases for three main reasons.

1) Firstly, male dorsal eyes contain significantly longer rhabdomeres (basic light sensing organelles in the ommatidia of eyes – 2 to 3 times longer in males) than those found in the female eyes or ventral eyes of males.

2) Second, the enlarged retina prominent in male dorsal eyes is characterized by larger facet diameters than those found in male ventral and female eyes, meaning that there is an increase in the aperture area of each facet.

3) Thirdly, Zeil was able to measure interommatidial angles by illuminating fly heads so that light traveled antidromically up the rhabdomeres. This technique revealed that male dorsal eyes have smaller interommatidial angles and different rhabdomere arrangements than ventral or female eyes.

At a functional level, increased aperture area and longer rhabdomere length both serve to increase photon capture efficiency in the male dorsal eye. Also, the smaller ommatidial angles and different rhabdomere arrangement observed in dorsal eyes are central to the function of the dorsal eye because they are neural superposition eyes, meaning that neural pooling of information from neighboring ommatidia is used to enhance sensitivity. Using a model that takes longer rhabdomeres, larger facet diameters, smaller ommatidial angles, and neural superposition into account, Zeil shows that the dorsal eye of males is able to detect small objects against a homogeneous background at a much greater distance than ventral or female eyes. The optical properties of longer rhabdomeres, increased facet diameter, and smaller ommatidial angles also aid in detection of small objects by increasing the resolution up to six times that of ventral or female eyes when neural pooling resulting from superposition is taken into account. Greater sensitivity to small light changes due to longer rhabdomeres and increased facet diameter, in combination with the ability to detect females at farther distances with higher resolution, allows male Bibionid flies to search for females at lower light levels (greater portion of the day) and to respond quickly to the presence of a female in order to catch her and initiate the "marriage by capture" that occurs in this family of flies. Unlike other fly families, the extreme dimorphism seen in Bibionids may be particularly relevant because these species do not swarm under a landmark, causing the course of females to be relatively unpredictable. As in the olfactory example above, the functional consequences of sex differences in Bibionids are linked to sex-specific behavior for which these sex differences play a key adaptive role.

== Auditory system of frogs ==
It is well known that the auditory systems of anurans are well adapted to detect species specific vocalizations, and that the behavioral response to these vocalizations often differs between the sexes. Sex differences in auditory systems have been found to underlie these gender specific behaviors in multiple species. In one particularly well-studied example, Peter Narins and his colleagues have examined sex differences in the auditory system of the Puerto Rican rain frog, Eleutherodactylus coqui, in which males give a two-note, species specific call. In E. coqui, the call is not only species specific, but also divided into sex specific components. The two-note call, from which the “coqui” frog derives its name, consists of a 100 ms “Co” note at around 1.2 kHz, followed by a much longer duration “Qui” note at around 2 kHz. Males of this species use this call in both territory defense and mate attraction, with the “Qui” note often being dropped out in aggressive interactions between males. Using playback experiments, Narins et al. found that males and females respond to different aspects of the call, with males showing a strong vocal response to calls containing “Co” notes, and females being preferentially attracted to calls containing “Qui” notes. Since the peripheral auditory system of anurans has been implicated in the detection of temporal and spectral features of male calls, follow up experiments were performed on the two auditory organs of the inner ear, the amphibian papilla and basilar papilla. Three major differences discovered in the auditory system help explain why, at a mechanistic level, male and female E. coqui are sensitive to different notes of the male call.

1) Electrophysiological recordings from the eighth cranial nerve of males and females reveal that primary auditory neurons of the two sexes are maximally excited by different frequencies. Of the three main classes of primary auditory units (low, mid, and high frequency), the high frequency units in females are tuned (maximally sensitive) to sounds of approximately 2 kHz (the frequency of the “Qui” note), whereas the same units in males appear to be tuned to >3 kHz. The mid frequency units, on the other hand, are tuned to around 1.2 kHz (frequency of the "Co" note) in males, and to significantly lower frequencies in females. Increased sensitivity in females to the "Qui" note and in males to the "Co" note explains the difference in behavioral responsiveness of each sex to the note of the call that is biologically relevant. The low and mid frequency units are thought to derive from the amphibian papilla, whereas the high frequency units correspond to the basilar papilla. Although no difference was found for low frequency units, the sex differences in mid and high frequency unit response suggest that there may be a neural basis for male "Co" note selectivity in the amphibian papilla, and for female “Qui” note selectivity in the basilar papilla.

2) By measuring Q10 values, it has also been found that the nerve fibers innervating the basilar papilla of males are more sharply tuned than those in females. Since the "Qui" note is a wide-band signal that sweeps upward in frequency, it appears as though the fibers innervating the female basilar papilla are better suited for detection of this component of the call. Sharp tuning in males decreases male selectivity for the "Qui" note, whereas comparatively broad tuning in females is suited for the detection of "Qui" notes that target females for mate attraction.

3) Finally, there is a sex difference in call duration sensitivity, with males showing the greatest response to 100 ms duration calls, approximately the length of the shorter, “Co” note of the call. Recordings from male cells in the torus semicircularis led to the identification of cells that respond preferentially to stimuli of 100-150 ms duration at 1000 Hz (frequency of the “Co” note). Similar recordings from fibers of the eighth cranial nerve found no equivalent cells that are duration sensitive. The discovery of duration sensitive “off-cells” (they fire upon cessation of a signal) in males is evidence of a neural basis for the male preference for “Co” length notes, and is in agreement with other studies that have found cells sensitive to preferred stimulus durations in the torus semicircularis of other anurans. Although duration sensitive cells which respond preferentially to longer stimuli have not been identified in females, this discovery shows that there may be male-specific cells that help explain the enhanced male response to short, aggressive, "Co" notes in E. coqui.

Altogether, sex specific tuning differences in the primary auditory neurons of the basilar papilla and duration sensitive cells in the torus semicircularis of males suggest a mechanism to explain the sex specific response behavior observed in E. coqui. Like sex differences in the olfactory system of M. sexta, and in the visual system of Bibionids, sex differences in the auditory system of E. coqui benefit receivers at a functional level by maximizing sensitivity to aggressive or mate attraction signals based on the sex of the receiver and which signal is relevant. In all three systems, the sensory systems of males and females are differently adapted to receive signals that are biologically useful and beneficial to survival or reproduction.

== Other notable examples ==
- Olfactory - Differential expression of antennal carrier protein genes in male and female mosquitoes. Since only females of this species seek hosts to obtain blood meals, females are expected to express differences in protein molecules used in host seeking. Sex differences in steady state levels of some antennal carrier protein genes have been discovered, but female specific antennal carrier protein genes have yet to be identified.
- Sex differences in human sensory systems.
