= Eneida's coquí =

Conservation status
- Critically Endangered (IUCN 3.1)

Scientific classification
- Kingdom: Animalia
- Phylum: Chordata
- Class: Amphibia
- Order: Anura
- Clade: Brachycephaloidea
- Family: Eleutherodactylidae
- Genus: Eleutherodactylus
- Subgenus: Eleutherodactylus
- Species: E. eneidae

Binomial name
- Eleutherodactylus eneidae Rivero, 1959

Species of amphibian

Eneida's coquí (Eleutherodactylus eneidae) is a species of coquí, a small variety of frog endemic to the main island of Puerto Rico and its archipelago. Known as coquí de Eneida in Puerto Rico, this amphibian is mainly terrestrial. Its average adult size is from 1.0 to 1.2 inches. It has a number of small warts located across its back and eyelids. Its main color is a light tone of greenish or grayish brown with a yellow tint on its underbelly. They often have a pair of light colored concave lines located on their backs. Their eyes are golden or green colored, generally dark colored with black venal reticulation. Its habitat is located in mountains that are 1,000 to 3,000 feet above sea level. This species seems to have suffered a population reduction, in the process disappearing from areas formerly considered its natural habitat. The reason behind this reduction is under study, and Eneida's coquí has been designated an endangered species until the cause is discovered. This population decrease is not considered to be linked with the loss of its habitat, which has prevented the protection of its habitat.

== See also ==
- List of amphibians and reptiles of Puerto Rico
- Fauna of Puerto Rico
- List of endemic fauna of Puerto Rico
