= Locust coquí =

Conservation status
- Endangered (IUCN 3.1)

Scientific classification
- Kingdom: Animalia
- Phylum: Chordata
- Class: Amphibia
- Order: Anura
- Clade: Brachycephaloidea
- Family: Eleutherodactylidae
- Genus: Eleutherodactylus
- Species: E. locustus

Binomial name
- Eleutherodactylus locustus Schmidt, 1920

Synonyms
- Eleutherodactylus cramptoni (Schmidt, 1920)

Species of amphibian

The locust coquí or coquí martillito (Eleutherodactylus locustus) is a species of frog in the family Eleutherodactylidae endemic to Puerto Rico. Its natural habitats are subtropical or tropical moist lowland forests and subtropical or tropical moist montane forests. E. locustus has suffered a population decline of more than 80% due to introduced predators and amphibian chytrid disease. Scientists believe amphibian chytrid disease may be exacerbated by climate change – warmer temperatures in dry, moist habitats, causing stress that may lead to greater susceptibility to the disease.

== Description ==
The locust coquí is a small species, approximately 0.8 inches (20 mm) in snout-vent length. It is brown overall, minutely variegated, with lighter brown or cream colors. A pair of externally concave lines is almost always visible on the back, but a variable-width line along the vertebrae may or may not be present. The eyes are large and protuberant, and the angles at the side of the snout are rounded and indistinct.

== Habits ==
Like other Eleutherodactylidae, E. locustus does not have interdigital membranes, so is not well adapted to swimming; instead, it has pads on its toes that allow it to adhere to leaves and branches. The species uses internal fertilization – the fertilized eggs undergo direct development. The tadpole stage occurs entirely within the egg, rather than as a free-living tadpole. Thus, a tiny but fully functional froglet hatches directly from the egg. E. locustus females deposit four to six clutches of about 28 eggs each per year, mostly during the rainy season, with a development period of 26 days. Males guard the eggs to keep them moist, and remain in the nest for a few days after they emerge. The call of E. locustus is a short whistle, followed by a series of clicks.

== Habitat ==
The locust coquí is restricted to the interior uplands of eastern Puerto Rico at elevations of 895 to 3,444 ft (273 to 1,050 m) above sea level. A terrestrial species, it occurs in mesic broadleaf, subtropical, moist lowland or subtropical moist montane forests.

Because an unexplained major decline in the abundance of this species has occurred in the last two decades, even in relatively undisturbed forests (such as El Yunque), this animal is rarely seen, but an easily accessible forest location sustains an E. locustus population. On the fern-covered slope above the Big Tree Nature Trail's roadside parking lot, the calls of locust coquis can be heard beginning in the late afternoon, just before sunset.

External audio
- Frog Call
- Click here to listen to the locust coqui vocals

== See also ==
- Fauna of Puerto Rico
- List of endemic fauna of Puerto Rico
- List of amphibians and reptiles of Puerto Rico
