= Web-footed coquí =

Web-footed coqui

Conservation status
- Critically endangered, possibly extinct (IUCN 3.1)

Scientific classification
- Kingdom: Animalia
- Phylum: Chordata
- Class: Amphibia
- Order: Anura
- Family: Eleutherodactylidae
- Genus: Eleutherodactylus
- Subgenus: Euhyas
- Species: E. karlschmidti

Binomial name
- Eleutherodactylus karlschmidti Grant, 1931

Synonyms
- Euhyas karlschmidti (Grant, 1931)

Species of amphibian

The web-footed coqui, stream coqui, Puerto Rican stream frog, Karl's robber frog or coquí palmeado (Eleutherodactylus karlschmidti), is a possibly extinct Puerto Rican frog species in the family Eleutherodactylidae. It was first described by Chapman Grant in 1931, and was named after herpetologist Karl Patterson Schmidt. It is the largest Eleutherodactylus species of Puerto Rico.

== Description ==
The maximum size is 80 mm (3.1 in) in snout–vent length. The overall appearance is stocky. The head is wider than the body. The eyes are large and protruding. The tympanum is small but distinct. The limbs are strong and relatively short. The fingers and the toes bear large discs. The fingers have no webbing whereas the toes are extensively webbed (the only coquí to do so). Skin is warty dorsally and smooth ventrally. Dorsal coloration consists of green, yellow, and black marbling. A yellow line runs between the eyes. Another yellow line touches the lip and extends backward to the tympanum. A vague transverse band is located at the shoulders and another, more distinct one half-way along the dorsum. The sides and lower part are marbled gray to partly plain gray. Males have bi-lobed vocal sac.

Males advertisement call is loud and sonorous.

== Habitat and conservation ==
Eleutherodactylus karlschmidti is an aquatic species that occurs in mountain streams at elevations of 45–630 m (148–2,067 ft) above sea level. It prefers rocky torrents in closed mesic forests. Males call from boulders, banks, and waterfalls. Development is direct (i.e., there is no free-living larval stage).

This species was once abundant in eastern Puerto Rico as well as in the western mountains. Its former range included the El Yunque National Forest. However, the latest record is from 1988, possibly even earlier, despite repeated surveys. It is almost certainly extinct. The likely reason is a combination of the fungal disease chytridiomycosis and climate change. Also invasive predators might have played a role.

== See also ==
- Fauna of Puerto Rico
- List of amphibians and reptiles of Puerto Rico

External audio
- Frog Call
- Web-footed Coquí Vocals
