= Melodius coquí =

Conservation status
- Endangered (IUCN 3.1)

Scientific classification
- Kingdom: Animalia
- Phylum: Chordata
- Class: Amphibia
- Order: Anura
- Clade: Brachycephaloidea
- Family: Eleutherodactylidae
- Genus: Eleutherodactylus
- Species: E. wightmanae

Binomial name
- Eleutherodactylus wightmanae Schmidt, 1920

Species of amphibian

The melodius coquí or coquí melodioso (Eleutherodactylus wightmanae) is a frog species in the family Eleutherodactylidae endemic to Puerto Rico. Its natural habitats are subtropical or tropical moist lowland forest and subtropical or tropical moist montane forest. It is threatened by habitat loss.

== See also ==
- Fauna of Puerto Rico
- List of amphibians and reptiles of Puerto Rico
