= Mona coqui =

Conservation status
- Vulnerable (IUCN 3.1)

Scientific classification
- Kingdom: Animalia
- Phylum: Chordata
- Class: Amphibia
- Order: Anura
- Family: Eleutherodactylidae
- Genus: Eleutherodactylus
- Species: E. monensis

Binomial name
- Eleutherodactylus monensis (Meerwarth, 1901)

Species of amphibian

The Mona coqui, coquí de la Mona or coquí de Mona (Eleutherodactylus monensis), is a species of frog in the family Eleutherodactylidae endemic to Mona, Puerto Rico. Its natural habitats are subtropical or tropical dry forest and subtropical or tropical dry shrubland.

== See also ==
- List of amphibians and reptiles of Puerto Rico
- Fauna of Puerto Rico
- List of endemic fauna of Puerto Rico
