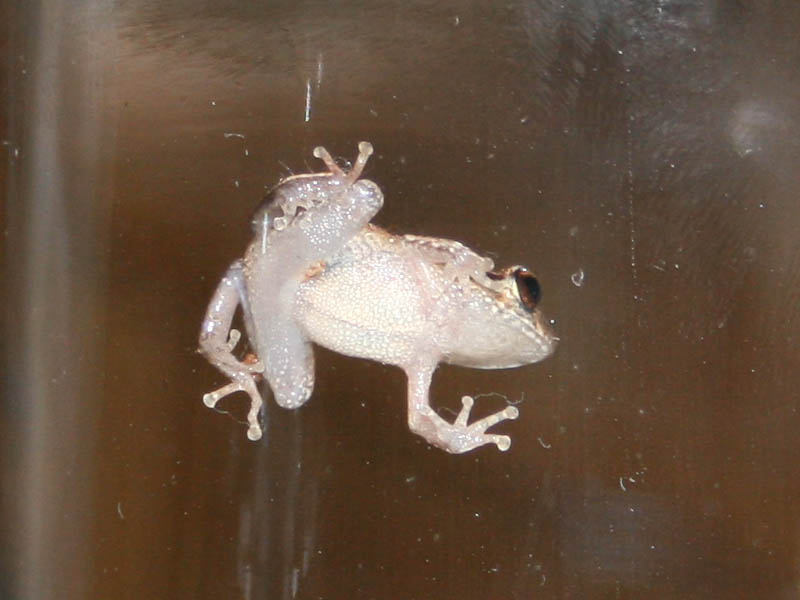

Conservation status
- Critically Endangered (IUCN 3.1)

Scientific classification
- Kingdom: Animalia
- Phylum: Chordata
- Class: Amphibia
- Order: Anura
- Family: Eleutherodactylidae
- Genus: Eleutherodactylus
- Subgenus: Eleutherodactylus
- Species: E. unicolor

Binomial name
- Eleutherodactylus unicolor Stejneger, 1904

Synonyms
- Euhyas unicolor (Stejneger, 1904)

= Dwarf coquí =

Species of amphibian

The dwarf coquí or elfin coquí (Eleutherodactylus unicolor, in Spanish coquí duende) is a species of frog endemic to Puerto Rico. It is placed in the subgenus Eleutherodactylus.

== Description ==
The dwarf coqui is a small frog with a grayish-brown back, a black-mask like face, and a series of light dots that follow through to the posterior of the frog. The females have a light line across the eyelids and usually have "white dots along the face, flanks, forelimbs, and thighs." The Eleutherodactylus species do not have webbed feet. These frogs, especially the dwarf coqui, have individual, finger-like feet, with round, disc-like toes. E. coqui is often referred to as the "coqui", which originates from its distinctive call. The "coqui" frogs are known for the unusual sounds they make. "The call of the dwarf coqui has been compared to the sound of a fingernail being dragged across the teeth of a comb or the winding of a watch."

== See also ==
- Fauna of Puerto Rico
- List of endemic fauna of Puerto Rico
- List of amphibians and reptiles of Puerto Rico
