= List of amphibians of Puerto Rico =

This is a list of the amphibians of the archipelago of Puerto Rico. The Puerto Rican archipelago consists of the main island of Puerto Rico, two island municipalities, Vieques and Culebra, one minor uninhabited island, Mona and several smaller islands and cays.

This list only includes animals with verifiable established populations in the archipelago of Puerto Rico. Many species of amphibians are introduced, both legally (mainly through the pet industry) and illegally, to the archipelago of Puerto Rico every year, with some of these species being subsequently released into the wild. However, non-viable breeding species do not constitute a breeding population and hence they lack inclusion in this list.

The following tags help provide additional information regarding the status of each species.

- ^{[e]} Endemic species.
- ^{[i]} Introduced species.
- ^{[ext]} Extinct species.
- ^{[ex]} Extirpated species

== Amphibians ==
=== Family Bufonidae ===
| Species | Common name | Puerto Rico | Culebra | Vieques | Mona | Other |
|---|---|---|---|---|---|---|
| Bufo marinus ^{[i]} | Marine toad | X | X | X | | |
| Bufo lemur ^{[e]} | Puerto Rican crested toad | X | | | | |

=== Family Hylidae ===
| Species | Common name | Puerto Rico | Culebra | Vieques | Mona | Other |
|---|---|---|---|---|---|---|
| Hyla cinerea ^{[i]} | American green tree frog | X | | | | |
| Osteopilus septentrionalis ^{[i]} | Cuban tree frog | X | | | | |
| Scinax ruber ^{[i]} | Red snouted treefrog | X | | | | |

=== Family Leptodactylidae ===
| Species | Common name | Puerto Rico | Culebra | Vieques | Mona | Other |
|---|---|---|---|---|---|---|
| Eleutherodactylus antillensis | Antillean coquí | X | X | X | | |
| Eleutherodactylus brittoni ^{[e]} | Grass coquí | X | | | | |
| Eleutherodactylus cochranae | Whistling coquí | X | | | | |
| Eleutherodactylus cooki ^{[e]} | Cook's robber frog | X | | | | |
| Eleutherodactylus coqui | Common coquí | X | X | X | | |
| Eleutherodactylus eneidae ^{[ext]} | Mottled coquí | X | | | | |
| Eleutherodactylus gryllus ^{[e]} | Cricket coquí | X | | | | |
| Eleutherodactylus hedricki ^{[e]} | Tree-hole coquí | X | | | | |
| Eleutherodactylus jasperi ^{[ext]} | Golden coquí | X | | | | |
| Eleutherodactylus juanariveroi ^{[e]} | Plains coquí | X | | | | |
| Eleutherodactylus karlschmidti ^{[ext]} | Web-footed coquí | X | | | | |
| Eleutherodactylus locustus ^{[e]} | Warty coquí | X | | | | |
| Eleutherodactylus monensis ^{[e]} | Mona coquí | | | | X | |
| Eleutherodactylus portoricensis ^{[e]} | Forest coquí | X | | | | |
| Eleutherodactylus richmondi ^{[e]} | Ground coquí | X | | | | |
| Eleutherodactylus unicolor ^{[e]} | Burrowing coquí | X | | | | |
| Eleutherodactylus wightmanae ^{[e]} | Melodious coquí | X | | | | |
| Leptodactylus albilabris | Caribbean white-lipped frog | X | X | X | | X ^{[7]} |

=== Family Ranidae ===
| Species | Common name | Puerto Rico | Culebra | Vieques | Mona | Other |
|---|---|---|---|---|---|---|
| Rana catesbeiana ^{[i]} | Bullfrog | X | | X | | |
| Rana grylio ^{[i]} | Pig frog | X | | | | |

== See also ==
- Fauna of Puerto Rico
- List of endemic fauna of Puerto Rico
- List of endemic flora of Puerto Rico
- List of mammals of Puerto Rico
- List of birds of Puerto Rico
- List of reptiles of Puerto Rico

== Footnotes ==
1. ^{endemic} This species is endemic to the archipelago of Puerto Rico.
2. ^{extinct} This species is extinct.
3. ^{extirpated} This species no longer occurs in the archipelago Puerto Rico but other populations exist elsewhere.
4. ^{introduced} This species was introduced to the archipelago of Puerto Rico.
5. ^{Caja de Muertos} This species occurs in Caja de Muertos Island.
6. ^{Cayo Batata} This species occurs in Cayo Batata.
7. ^{Cayo Santiago} This species occurs in Cayo Santiago.
8. ^{Desecheo} This species occurs in the island of Desecheo.
9. ^{Magueyes} This species occurs in Magueyes island.
10. ^{Monito} This species occurs in the island of Monito.
11. ^{Culebrita} This species occurs in the island of Culebrita.
