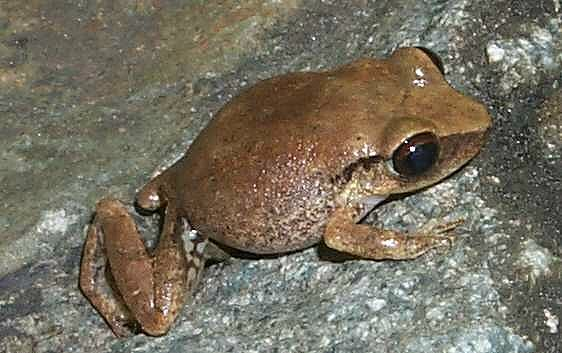

Conservation status
- Least Concern (IUCN 3.1)

Scientific classification
- Kingdom: Animalia
- Phylum: Chordata
- Class: Amphibia
- Order: Anura
- Clade: Brachycephaloidea
- Family: Eleutherodactylidae
- Genus: Eleutherodactylus
- Species: E. antillensis

Binomial name
- Eleutherodactylus antillensis (Reinhardt & Lutken, 1863)

= Red-eyed coquí =

Species of amphibian

The red-eyed coquí, churí, coqui churí, or coquí de las Antillas (Eleutherodactylus antillensis) is a species of frog in the family Eleutherodactylidae that is found in Puerto Rico, the British and U.S. Virgin Islands, and introduced to Panama. Its unique physical, habitual, and behavioral characteristics distinguish it from other members of the genus Eleutherodactylus, which contains around 185 species located in the southern United States, Central America, South America, and the Caribbean, with 16 different species endemic to Puerto Rico. The red-eyed coqui was brought into Panama City from its native habitats in the late 1960s. There it became established in urban parks before it began to colonize outside the city in the 1980s. In Puerto Rico, the largest island inhabited by the red-eyed coqui, it is found up to 1,200 meters above sea level. It is often compared to the common coqui, Puerto Rico's unofficial territorial symbol, although it has several distinctive features.

== Physical characteristics ==
The red-eyed coqui can be distinguished by its cinnamon red colored eyes and black-spotted thighs. It has an angular, broad flat head, a short body, a black streak on each side of its snout, a short black line above the tympanum (external auditory membrane), and a light colored line along the center of its back. Its upper body is a pale gray to dull brown color, and it contains individual non-webbed toes and long digits. People often confuse this species for the common coqui since their calls are similar.

== Habitat ==
The red-eyed coqui is found in lowland or intermediate elevation forests, such as dry forest, and is abundant in open, disturbed habitats. In contrast to common coquis, the red-eyed coqui is generally found in dry habitats. It can survive a long periods without rain as long as it remains hydrated in its hidden location. In Panama, however, it is found in urban areas, residential gardens, and unoccupied land. Although it is widely dispersed, it is not as abundant as other Eleutherodactylus species. In the day it hides under grass roots, loose barks of trees, rocks, logs, and trash. On the other hand, at night it hides in low bushes and tree branches which aids in its predation tactics.

== Behavior ==
Red-eyed coquis are nocturnal predators. They eat insects, spiders, other arthropods, and mollusks primarily at night. From dusk until dawn males call using a churee-churee sound with no pause between the notes, and an assumed territorial call kee-kee-kee. After midnight, however, the calls decrease greatly. In order to attract a mate, the male red-eyed coqui makes calls from prominent perches rather than low hidden locations until it finds a female. Their reproductive cycle is also unique. Members of the genus Eleutherodactylus do not require water as part of the reproduction process, because they do not pass through a tadpole stage. The female lays an egg clutch of 24 to 42 eggs under a thin layer of damp leaf litter or soil. The eggs hatch and a fully formed miniature version of an adult develops. Adults may guard the hatchlings as they develop.

== Survival ==
On the IUCN Red List the red-eyed coqui is classified as of 'least concern', meaning that in the absence of any threats it is not considered to be close to extinction. This is partly due to the wide range of suitable habitats for the red-eyed coqui's range. Puerto Rico's increasing forest habitat assists in the increase of suitable habitats for the frog. It is not clear how external factors specifically threaten the species, but its predator, the Cuban tree frog (Osteopilus septentrionalis), regulates its population.

== See also ==
- Fauna of Puerto Rico
- List of amphibians and reptiles of Puerto Rico

External audio
- Frog Call
- Click here for Red-eyed Coqui Vocals
