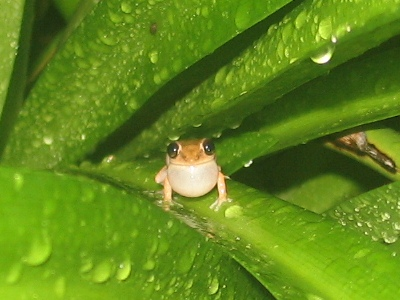

Conservation status
- Least Concern (IUCN 3.1)

Scientific classification
- Kingdom: Animalia
- Phylum: Chordata
- Class: Amphibia
- Order: Anura
- Clade: Brachycephaloidea
- Family: Eleutherodactylidae
- Genus: Eleutherodactylus
- Species: E. brittoni

Binomial name
- Eleutherodactylus brittoni Schmidt, 1920

= Grass coquí =

Species of amphibian

The grass coquí or coquí de las hierbas (Eleutherodactylus brittoni) is a species of frog in the family Eleutherodactylidae, endemic to Puerto Rico. Its natural habitats are subtropical or tropical moist lowland forest, subtropical or tropical moist montane forest, subtropical or tropical seasonally wet or flooded lowland grassland, plantations, rural gardens, and heavily degraded former forest. It is threatened by habitat loss.

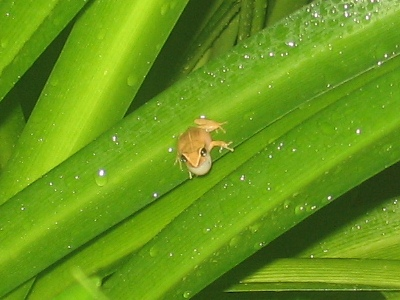
E. brittoni found in Puerto Rico

== See also ==
- Fauna of Puerto Rico
- List of amphibians and reptiles of Puerto Rico

External audio
- Frog Call
- Grass Coqui Vocal
