= Bronze coquí =

Conservation status
- Endangered (IUCN 3.1)

Scientific classification
- Kingdom: Animalia
- Phylum: Chordata
- Class: Amphibia
- Order: Anura
- Family: Eleutherodactylidae
- Genus: Eleutherodactylus
- Species: E. richmondi

Binomial name
- Eleutherodactylus richmondi Stejneger, 1904

Synonyms
- Eleutherodactylus lentus richmondi - Barbour, 1937

Species of amphibian

The bronze coquí, Richmond's coquí, coquí caoba or coquí de Richmond (Eleutherodactylus richmondi), is a species of frog in the family Eleutherodactylidae. The specific epithet, richmondi, is dedicated to Dr. Charles W. Richmond. It is endemic to Puerto Rico, and its natural habitats are subtropical or tropical moist lowland forest and subtropical or tropical moist montane forest.

== See also ==
- Fauna of Puerto Rico
- List of endemic fauna of Puerto Rico
- List of amphibians and reptiles of Puerto Rico

External audio
- Frog Call
- Click here to listen to the Bronze Coqui Vocals
