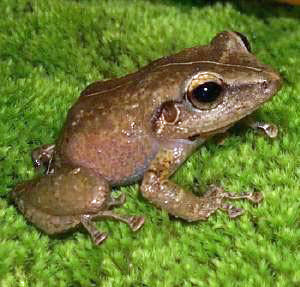

Conservation status
- Least Concern (IUCN 3.1)

Scientific classification
- Kingdom: Animalia
- Phylum: Chordata
- Class: Amphibia
- Order: Anura
- Clade: Brachycephaloidea
- Family: Eleutherodactylidae
- Genus: Eleutherodactylus
- Species: E. coqui

Binomial name
- Eleutherodactylus coqui Thomas, 1966

= Common coquí =

Species of amphibian

The common coquí, widely known as the coquí (Eleutherodactylus coqui), is a species of frog native to Puerto Rico belonging to the family Eleutherodactylidae. The species is named for the loud call the males make at night, which serves two purposes; the "co" serves to repel other males and establish territory while the "quí" serves to attract females. The auditory systems of males and females respond preferentially to different notes of the male call, displaying sex difference in a sensory system. The common coquí is a very important aspect of Puerto Rican culture, and it has become an unofficial territorial symbol of Puerto Rico.

"Sound of coqui"

== Taxonomy ==
The common coquí was described as a species new to science by Richard Thomas in 1966. It belongs to the genus Eleutherodactylus which in Greek means free toes. This family is also known as the "robber" or "thief" frogs. This genus contains 185 species, which are found in the Southern United States, Central America, South America, and the Caribbean. It is part of the order Anura, which includes all frogs and toads. The scientific name of the common coquí, Eleutherodactylus coqui, was first described by Spanish naturalist José Félix de Arroyo de la Cuesta, in 1875 (Arroyo de la Cuesta, 1875). The genus Eleutherodactylus, of which the common coquí is a member, is the largest genus of frogs in the world, with over 700 known species. The common coquí is closely related to other members of the Eleutherodactylidae family, including the Eleutherodactylus jasperi and the Eleutherodactylus portoricensis. These species are all native to Puerto Rico and are distinguished from each other by their physical characteristics and vocalizations (Joglar and López, 1997). This taxonomic classification reflects the evolutionary relationships between the common coquí and other species within the animal kingdom.

== Morphology and lifespan ==
Full-grown male coquís measure, from snout to vent, from 30 to 37 mm (1.2 to 1.5 in), with an average of 34 mm (1.3 in), while full-grown females measure from 36 to 52 mm (1.4 to 2.0 in), with an average of 41 mm (1.6 in). The elevation of the coquí's habitat affects their size. Areas with higher elevation have larger coquís. The size differences between sexes are a result of additional energy consumption related to breeding behavior by males.

Coquís are muddy-brown in mottled coloration on the top with rust-tan flanks and a light-gray belly. As tree frogs, Coquís possess sticky pads on the tips of their toes which help them adhere to moistened or slippery surfaces They do not possess webbed feet and are not adapted to swimming.

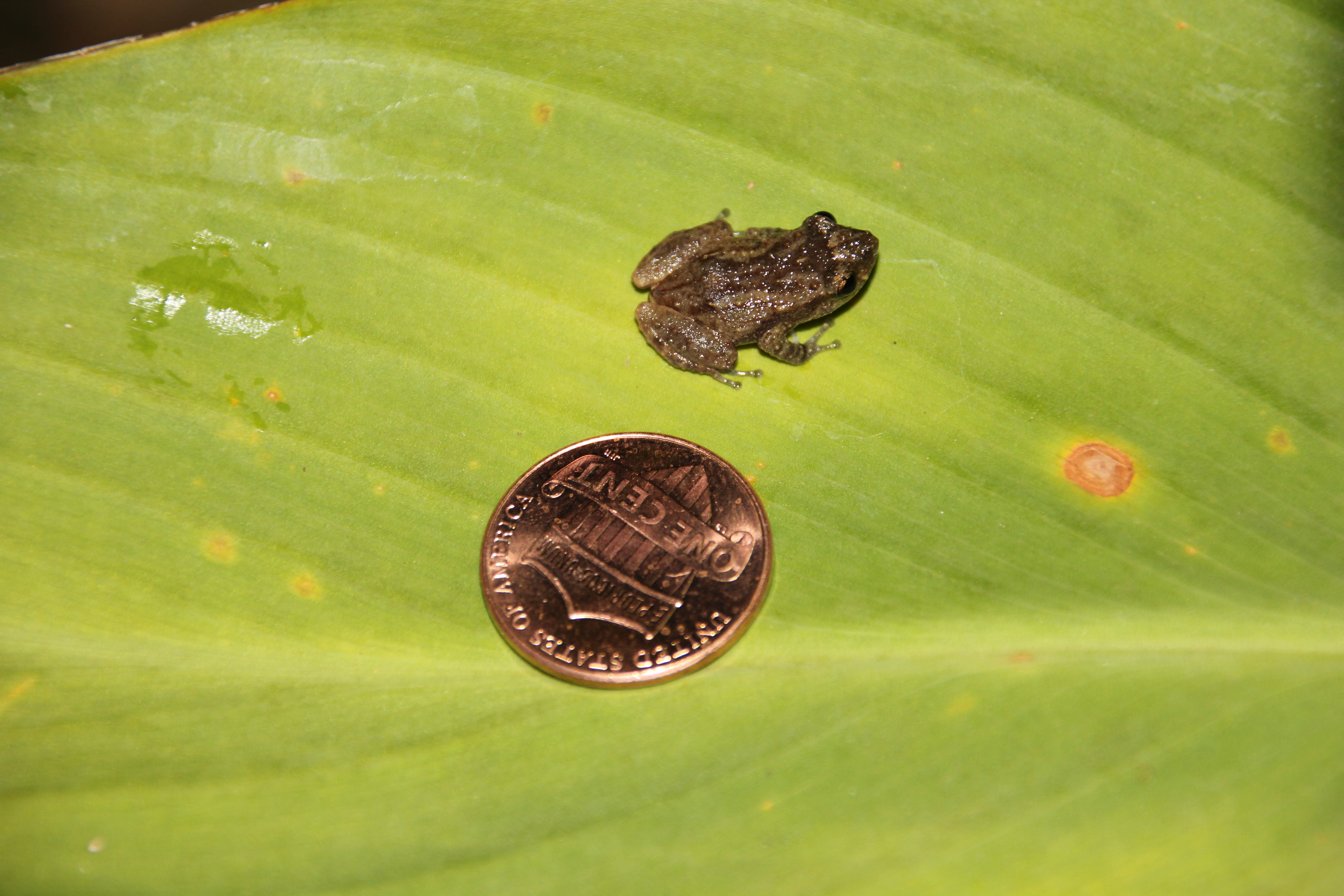
A whistling coquí next to a US penny

The known lifespan of the common coquí is up to 6 years in the wild, but the majority of adults do not live past one year. The species is generally believed to have a relatively short lifespan, with most individuals living for less than a year. In a study of the population dynamics of the common coquí, researchers found that the species has a high mortality rate, with only a small proportion of individuals surviving to reach adulthood. This high mortality is likely due to a variety of factors, including predation, disease, and competition for resources.

=== Evolutionary morphology ===
A study by Lawrence and Stewart aimed to explore the spatial and temporal variation in color pattern morphology in the Coqui frog population in northeastern Puerto Rico. The researchers recorded pattern morphs for 9,950 frogs captured at nine locations over a 25-year period. The data revealed 21 distinct pattern morphs, including stripes, bars, and spots. Significant differences in morph frequencies were observed among locations, with longitudinal stripes more common in grassland, and spot and bar morphs more common in forests. The analysis also showed temporal shifts in morph frequencies immediately following Hurricane Hugo in 1989, indicating that the pattern polymorphism is influenced by major habitat disturbances. The researchers suggested that the polymorphism is maintained, at least in part, by local habitat matching driven by selection pressure from visual predators.

The coquí is preyed upon by various vertebrate and invertebrate predators. The study explored the evolutionary adaptations in color and pattern variations that reduce the risk of predation. The concept of camouflage, cryptic coloration, and disruptive patterns were discussed in the context of predator-prey interactions. The researchers hypothesized that the pattern polymorphism observed in Coqui frogs is a result of selective pressures from visual predators, primarily birds, which develop search tactics and perceive the color patterns of their amphibian prey. The paper also discussed the potential factors influencing pattern polymorphisms, including apostatic selection and local habitat matching. The authors suggested that these factors, along with the likely heritability of pattern morphs, contribute to the maintenance of multiple patterns in the Coqui population.

== Native and invasive habitats ==
=== Native distribution ===
Common coquís are native to the islands of Puerto Rico, Vieques and Culebra, where they are widespread and abundant; the only notable exception occurs in Puerto Rican dry forests, where the species is rarer. The common coquí is the most abundant frog in Puerto Rico, with densities estimated at 20,000 individuals/ha. Densities fluctuate depending on the season and habitat. Generally, densities are higher during the latter half of the wet season and decrease during the dry season. The species is considered a habitat generalist, occurring in a wide range of habitats, including mesic broadleaf forests, mountains, and urban areas, found in bromeliads, tree holes, and under trunks, rocks or trash. Since the species does not require bodies of water to reproduce, they can be found on most altitudes, provided sufficient moisture is available. In Puerto Rico, they are found from sea level to a maximum of 1,200 m (3,900 ft). Adults generally tend to be found at higher altitudes than juveniles.

The common coquís are often found in cohabitation with humans. Because of their unrestricted habitat use, E. coquí can commonly be found in homes and parks. E. coquí are found in natural habitats including the human mountain forest at elevations less than 1,200 meters and in the dry forest. They are found specifically within the under story of forests at all elevations up to the canopy.

=== Invasive population distribution ===
The species has been introduced to Colombia, Hawaii in the United States, and the Virgin Islands. It has become a densely populated invasive species in the Hawaiian Islands, where it was accidentally introduced in the late 1980s, most likely as a stowaway on potted plants, and quickly established itself on all four major islands. It is now considered a pest species by the State of Hawaii, and in the year 2000 it was put on IUCN's list of 100 of the world's worst invasive species. As an invasive species, it can reach up to 91,000 individuals/ha, almost 5 times its maximum density in its native Puerto Rico. Higher densities in its invaded range are likely bolstered by a release from native predators, lack of interspecific competitors, and abundant food availability. In Hawaii, they have been found at a maximum of 1,170 m (3,840 ft) above sea level. They were previously introduced in the Dominican Republic and to Louisiana and Florida, but these populations have now been eradicated.

Common coquís in areas where their density exceeds 51,000/ha could consume over 300,000 invertebrates per night. Because of their large populations, Hawaii worries about both economic and ecological impacts. The common coquí currently costs this state nearly 3 million dollars a year. Its spread has been commonly through the nursery trade, and as a result many people are reluctant to buy plants from nurseries that might be infected. Those began to perform quarantines and de-infestations in order to improve their prospects. Coquis also affect real estate values in residential neighborhoods, as many refrain from buying houses where their sleep would be disturbed by the up to 73 dB call of the common coquí.

== Diet ==
The common coquí is a generalist nocturnal predator, which can consume, as a population, 114,000 invertebrates each night per hectare. Diets vary depending on age and size, but are primarily composed of arthropods. Juveniles consume smaller prey, such as ants, while adults consume more varied diets that include spiders, moths, crickets, snails, and small frogs. The frogs are opportunistic sit-and-wait predators, and will forage on any abundant prey. Males will occasionally consume eggs from their own clutch, likely to provide supplemental nourishment while guarding their nests.

Calling males eat less prey than quiet males, which consume most of their food by midnight, while calling males had eaten only 18% of their food by the same hour.

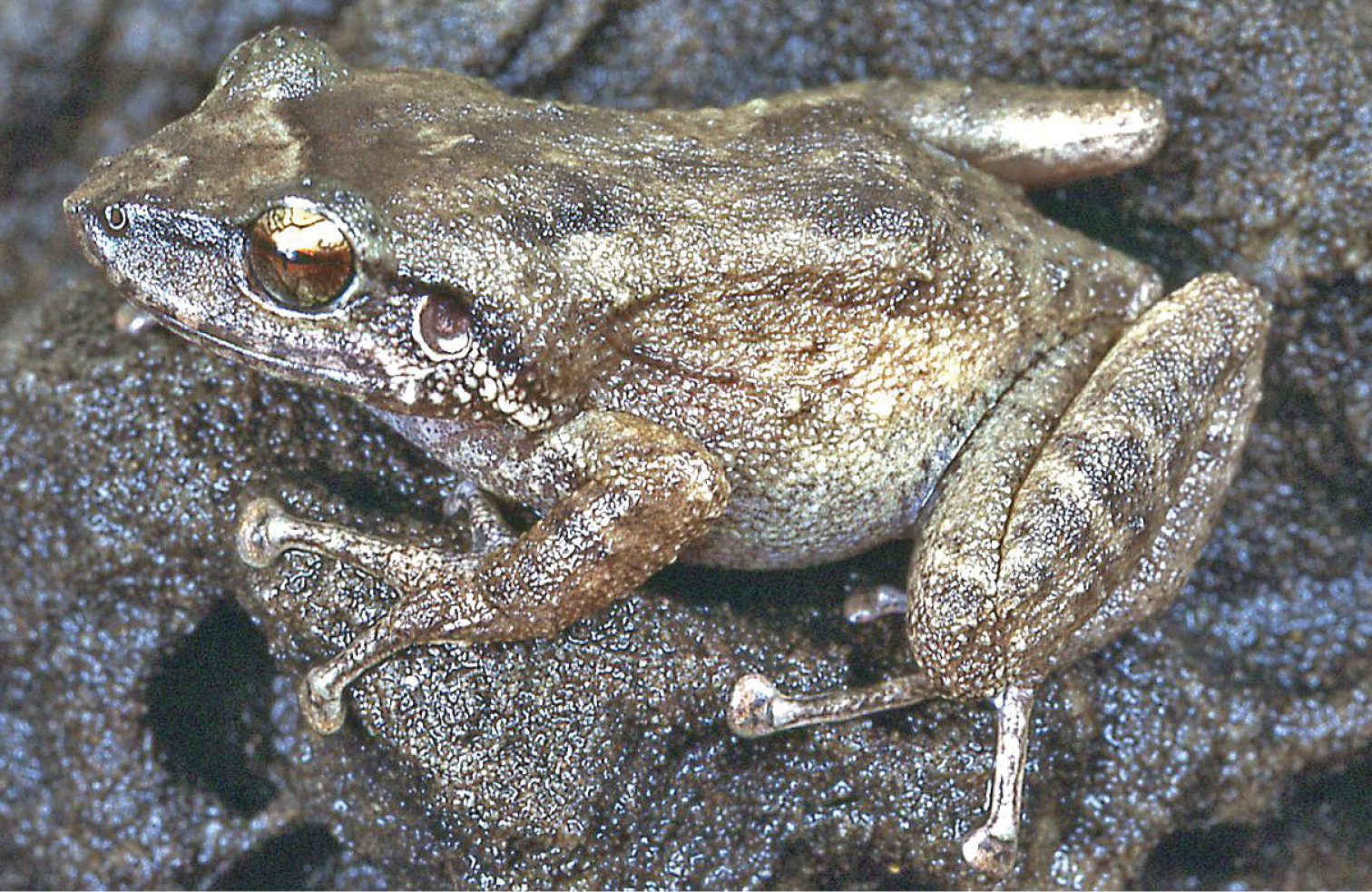
Eleutherodactylus coqui

=== Native ecological impact ===
Experiments conducted in the Bisley Watersheds of Puerto Rico explored the ecological impact of Eleutherodactylus coqui on various components of the local ecosystem. The research involved small-scale and large-scale experiments to assess the effects on invertebrate populations, herbivory, plant growth, and leaf-litter decomposition. In the small-scale experiment, enclosures were used to examine the influence of E. coqui on invertebrates, herbivory, and plant growth. Meanwhile, the large-scale experiment utilized removal plots to evaluate the broader impact of E. coqui on ecosystem processes in a natural forest setting.

Findings revealed that the presence of E. coqui led to a 28% reduction in aerial invertebrates, with significant declines in herbivory rates by approximately 80%. In addition, there was evidence of increased foliage production and enhanced leaf-litter decomposition rates in the presence of E. coqui. These consistent trends across both small and large scales emphasize the potential scale-dependent nature of species effects on ecosystem dynamics. The frog displayed ecological significance as a vertebrate predator in influencing invertebrate communities and nutrient cycling within the tropical forest ecosystem.

=== Invasive population diet impact on local ecology ===
Experiments investigated the diet and foraging behavior of the invasive Eleutherodactylus coqui species in Hawaii, and their potential impact on the local invertebrate communities. The study explored the prey preferences of different life stages (subadults, adult males, and adult females) across multiple sites and microhabitats. The researchers also aimed to determine the types and amounts of endemic invertebrates consumed by E. coqui, shedding light on the potential ecological consequences of their invasion. The experimental design involved the collection and analysis of 696 E. coqui individuals from 11 different sites in Hawaii. The specimens were categorized based on sex and life stage, and their stomach contents were examined to identify and quantify the invertebrates they consumed. Several methods were employed to collect invertebrates from different microhabitats, including flying insects captured using UV light traps, foliage invertebrates collected from understory plants, and extracted litter invertebrates. Statistical analyses, such as ANOVAs and PCAs, were utilized to assess factors like microhabitat use, prey diversity, and prey selection across sites and classes. Subadults and adults showed different microhabitat preferences, with subadults often found on leaves and adults distributed more evenly on trunks and leaves.

The diet compositions varied among life stages, with subadults consuming more prey and exhibiting greater prey diversity than adults. Certain invertebrate groups, including ants and amphipods, were overrepresented in the stomach contents compared to environmental samples, suggesting prey preference. Lastly, the study concluded on potential vulnerabilities of endemic invertebrates to E. coqui predation.

== Behavior ==
Common coqui are nocturnal and their behavior is influenced by the surrounding environment, specifically the moisture levels. When humidity levels rise at night they emerge and begin climbing to their homes in the canopy. As these humidity levels decrease they move back down to lower levels where the humidity is higher. The younger coqui populations live in the understory on leaves during the drier periods. The leaves are particularly common with this population because they provide protection from invaders. As they grow into adulthood, the coquis journey up to the canopy and begin the process stated above.

A comparative behavioral study between frog species identified possible explanation for jump and hydration level correlations. The paper, "Water loss, cutaneous resistance, and effects of dehydration on locomotion of Eleutherodactylus frogs," examines the effects of water loss and dehydration on two species of neotropical frogs, the common coquí and the cave coquí (Eleutherodactylus cooki). The researchers found that jumping performance declined with an increase in water loss and a longer duration of exposure to dehydrating conditions. The common coquí, which occupies a wider range of habitats, including dry forests, had a slightly higher rate of water loss and lower cutaneous resistance than the cave coquí. However, these differences were not significant enough to explain the different geographic distributions of the two species. The study suggests that behavioral adaptations, rather than physiological differences, may play a role in the common coquí's ability to survive in drier habitats.

=== Habitat-behavioral research ===
A study conducted by Karen H. Beard aimed to perform a quantitative analysis of adult and juvenile Eleutherodactylus coqui habitat preferences in Puerto Rico. The study focused on the Luquillo Experimental Forest, a subtropical wet forest where the coqui is the most abundant nocturnal species. The research involved two surveys: one to quantify potential habitat range and another to quantify habitat use. The researchers found that coquis used most available habitats, but adults and juveniles showed different preferences regarding plant species, habitat structural components, and heights from the forest floor. The quantitative analysis revealed that adult and juvenile coquis exhibited opposite associations with important plant species in the forest, such as Prestoea montana and Heliconia caribaea.

Adults had a negative association with leaves but a positive association with leaf litter, while juveniles showed the opposite trend. There were also differences in the distribution with respect to height, with adults being more evenly distributed and preferring heights around 1.1 m, while juveniles preferred heights closer to the forest floor. The researchers used goodness-of-fit G-statistics to assess whether coquis exhibited a random distribution with respect to plant species, habitat structural components, and height. The results indicated nonrandom spatial distributions, suggesting that coquis had specific preferences.

== Invasive behavior ==
One study aimed to investigate the population densities of Eleutherodactylus coqui in newly invaded areas of Hawaii compared to its native habitat in Puerto Rico to understand the rapid expansion and high population densities of E. coqui in Hawaii, exploring potential factors contributing to its success. The research utilized mark-recapture methods and sound pressure level measurements to estimate population sizes and investigate the acoustic presence of E. coqui. Population study plots were established in east Hawaii at Pu'ainako and Lava Tree State Monument (LTSM), and long-term study plots were maintained in Puerto Rico. Census surveys were conducted over multiple seasons, and adult frogs were marked and recaptured to estimate population sizes. Invertebrate predators were also counted during frog censuses. Sound pressure level readings were recorded at various sites in east Hawaii to assess the intensity of frog chorusing.

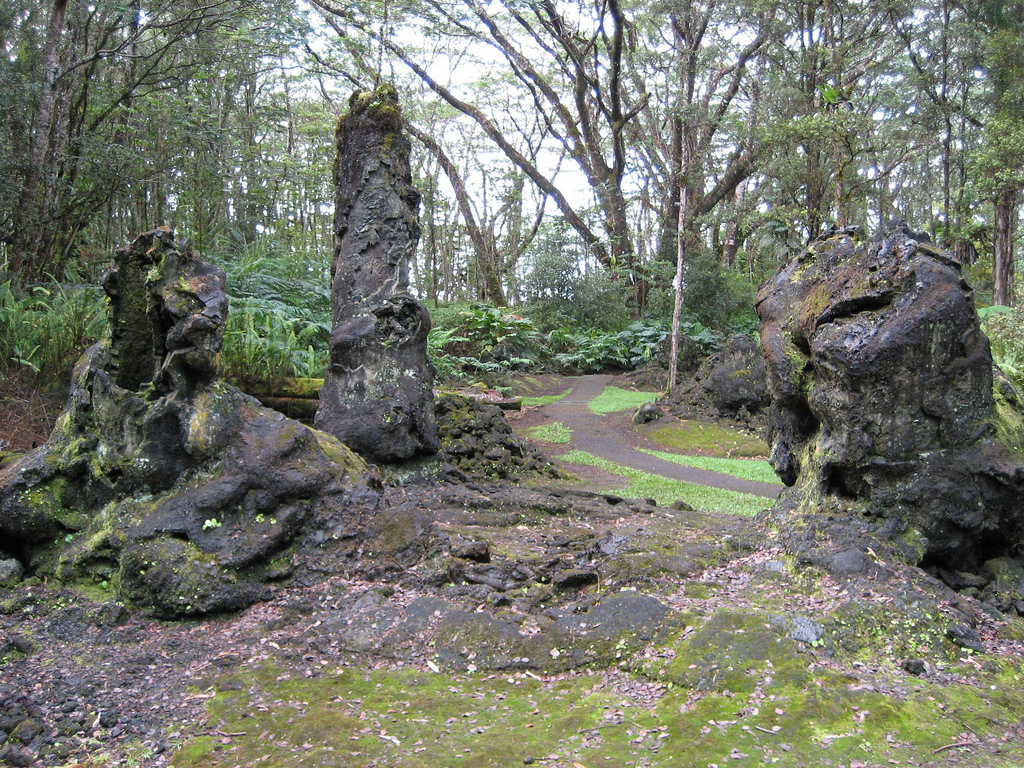
Lava Tree State Park

The study revealed that E. coqui populations in Hawaii, particularly at LTSM, exhibited significantly higher population densities than native populations in Puerto Rico. The Pu'ainako site, recently colonized by E. coqui, showed a growing population with low juvenile counts initially, suggesting a rapid establishment of reproductive populations within one to two years. The sex ratio was male-biased, and the population density in Hawaii was estimated to be three times higher than in Puerto Rico.

The study pointed to the apparent lack of effective frog predators in Hawaii, possibly contributing to the high population densities. SPL readings indicated that many sites in east Hawaii had intense frog chorusing, suggesting the potential for further expansion. The findings suggest that E. coqui is transforming the ecological dynamics in Hawaii, capitalizing on the absence of native or exotic predators and abundant retreat sites, leading to unusually high population densities compared to its native habitat in Puerto Rico. The invasion is not only altering the sonic environment but also influencing the arthropod predatory regime in Hawaiian forests.

== Reproduction ==
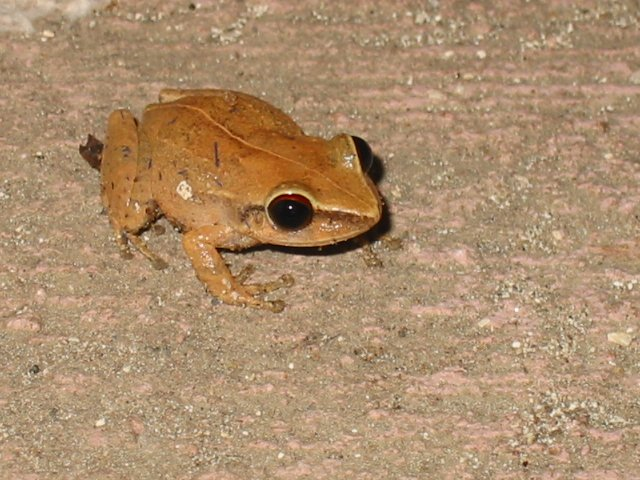
Coqui

Common coquís reproduce over the entire year, but breeding activity peaks around the wet season. Females usually lay between 16 and 40 eggs, four to six times each year, at about eight-week intervals. Eluetherodactylus coqui exhibits internal fertilization, and embryos develop within large yolk-rich eggs that provide all required nutrients until hatching as fully formed froglets. Eggs are guarded from predators—other common coquís and Subulina snails—by the males. The gestation period of coquís is from 17 to 26 days. The maturation period, the time from egg to reproductive coquí, is around eight months. Unlike most frogs, which lay their eggs in water, coquís lay their eggs on palm tree leaves or other terrestrial plants. Abandoned bird nests are also used as nests by E. coqui. The bananaquit, Puerto Rican bullfinch and Puerto Rican tody share nests with the coquí. This method of reproduction allows the coquí to live in forests, mountains and other habitats without direct dependency on water. Since eggs are laid on land, coquís bypass the tadpole stage, proceeding to develop limbs within their eggs, rather than going through a metamorphosis as a larva in water. Thus, a fully independent froglet emerges from the egg, with a small tail that is lost shortly after. This stage of direct development has allowed the coqui to become a successful terrestrial colonizer in tropical areas. Eggs hatch within eight weeks and reach reproductive maturity within one year. The common coqui releases their young from the egg using an egg tooth that the genus Eleutherodactylus forms. Both males and females fight off intruders from their nests by jumping, chasing and sometimes biting. The males are the primary caretakers of the eggs. They offer protection and moist environments through skin contact. They will leave during very dry periods in order to collect more moisture for their offspring.

Males begin their mating calls by perching above ground level.

External audio
- The coqui's distinct calls may be heard here, and here.

The coqui's call (or canto in Spanish) is used both as a way of attracting a mate and to establish a territorial boundary. A coqui may enter another's territory and challenge the incumbent by starting his call, at which point they may engage in a sort of singing duel (which can last for several minutes). The first to falter in keeping up with the cadence is considered the loser and leaves the area without resorting to physical violence. This behavior is consistent across different species (which have distinctive calls), so it is possible to hear a duel where one coqui sings "COQUI" and another "COQUIRIQUI".

=== Influences on reproductive success ===
Field experiments by the Luquillo Experimental Division of the Caribbean National investigated the reproductive phenology, ecology, and patterns of male and female reproductive success in Eleutherodactylus coqui. The researchers focused on a second-growth rainforest near the El Verde Field Station. Data was collected over two years, covering various seasons to observe potential seasonality in reproductive activities. The research aimed to understand the influences of environmental factors such as temperature and rainfall on the reproductive behaviors of E. coqui. It sought to explore the relationships between male body size, calling behavior, and mating success, as well as investigate the factors influencing female reproductive success, including clutch size and hatching rate.

The results revealed that E. coqui exhibited prolonged breeding behavior, engaging in reproductive activities every month throughout the study. However, there was distinct seasonality, with reduced calling and clutch deposition during the dry season (January–February) and increased activity during the transition to the wet season (March–April) and the peak during the wet season (May–July). Both precipitation and temperature were positively correlated with reproductive activity. In terms of male reproduction, there was variability in mating success among males, but the relative variance in male mating success was relatively low compared to other anuran breeding aggregations. The practice of male parental care contributed to this low variance, as males caring for eggs typically reduced their calling activity. The study did not find evidence supporting a large male advantage or size-assortative mating. Instead, male mating success was correlated with calling effort, emphasizing the importance of active participation in chorusing.

For females, clutch size was strongly related to body size and exhibited seasonal variation. Male parental care and nest site quality significantly impacted hatching success. The results suggested that female choice, particularly in selecting mates based on their parental care quality and nest site, could significantly impact female reproductive success.

== Invasive management strategies ==
Invasive management practices against the common coquí frog aim to control and reduce the population of this species in areas where it has been introduced, such as Hawaii. Preventative measures include banning the intentional transport of frogs, as well as the implementation of hot-water shower treatments on ornamental plants to kill coquí eggs, subadults, and adults. This can reduce the potential spread of the species through the trade of plants. Physical control methods, such as hand-capture, can be effective for small populations of common coquí frogs. Chemical control methods, such as the use of caffeine and water solutions, are also being tested for their efficacy in controlling the species on a larger scale. Citric acid has also been suggested as a potential control method, although its efficacy has not been demonstrated. An evolving variety of management practices are being explored and implemented in order to control and reduce the population of common coquí frogs in invaded areas.

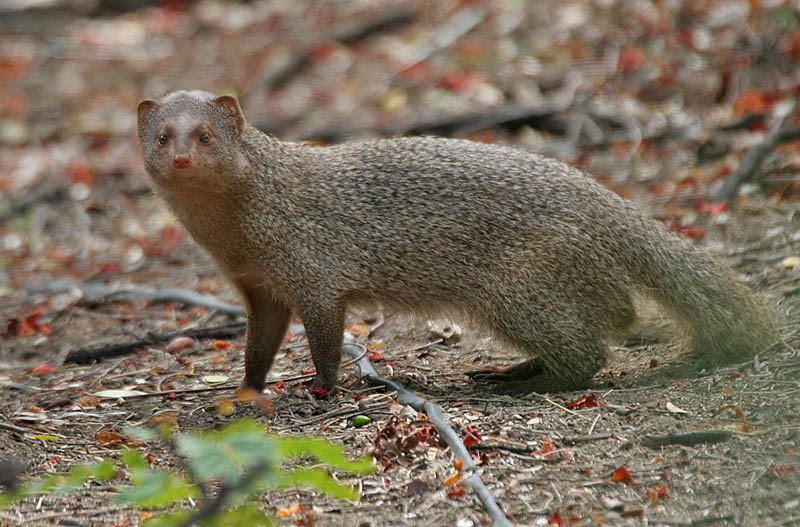
Indian mongoose

In Hawaiian forests, researchers investigated the invasive population to understand their potential predators and their impact on the ecosystem. Research conducted in Lava Tree State Park aimed to investigate whether introduced predators such as rats, the small Indian mongoose, and the cane toad were consuming E. coqui. Contrary to expectations, the research found that rats, known to be nocturnal and arboreal, did not consume the invasive frog. Instead, rats predominantly consumed plant material, indicating that E. coqui is unlikely to significantly impact rat populations. However, the study revealed that mongooses, despite being diurnal and reportedly poor climbers, opportunistically consumed E. coqui, suggesting a potential role in controlling the invasive frog population. Approximately 6.6–19.2% of mongoose prey items by weight consisted of E. coqui. The cane toad, on the other hand, did not consume E. coqui in the study.

== See also ==
- Fauna of Puerto Rico
- List of amphibians and reptiles of Puerto Rico
- List of endemic fauna of Puerto Rico
- Puerto Rican spindalis
- Flor de maga
