= Invasive Species Compendium =

Biological database

The Invasive Species Compendium Channel (ISC), part of the CABI Compendium, is an online, encyclopedic reference resource covering recognition, biology, distribution, impact, and management of invasive plants and animals produced by CAB International alongside an international consortium. It comprises peer-reviewed datasheets, images, and maps, a bibliographic database, and full text articles. New datasheets, data sets, and scientific literature are added on a weekly basis. The ISC has been resourced by a diverse international consortium of government departments, non-governmental organizations, and private companies.

== Coverage ==
The Invasive Species Compendium Channel currently covers over 1,500 species with over 7,000 basic summary datasheets and 1,500 detailed datasheets. In addition, it provides access to over 1,100 full text articles (in PDF format) and 75,000 article abstracts.
