= Eleutherodactylus portoricensis =

Conservation status
- Endangered (IUCN 3.1)

Scientific classification
- Kingdom: Animalia
- Phylum: Chordata
- Class: Amphibia
- Order: Anura
- Family: Eleutherodactylidae
- Genus: Eleutherodactylus
- Subgenus: Eleutherodactylus
- Species: E. portoricensis

Binomial name
- Eleutherodactylus portoricensis Schmidt, 1927

Species of amphibian

Eleutherodactylus portoricensis (vernacular Spanish: coquí de la montaña) is a species of frog native to Puerto Rico that belongs to the family Eleutherodactylidae. Its vernacular English names are forest coquí, upland coquí, mountain coquí, and Puerto Rican robber frog. The species' range spans the Sierra de Luquillo mountains of northeastern Puerto Rico and the Cordillera Central, which forms the highland "backbone" of Puerto Rico and includes an eastern extension beginning at the city of Cayey. However, the species is likely extirpated from the western Cordillera Central (west of Cayey).

== History and nomenclature ==
The history of this species is quite complex, as is that of the common coquí (Eleutherodactylus coqui). In 1927 Eleutherodactylus portoricensis was described as the Puerto Rican coquí and was classified as a species that lives only in Puerto Rico and is distinct from species that live on other Caribbean islands. As such, it was classified as a new species by American herpetologist Karl Patterson Schmidt in 1927. From 1927 to 1966 the nighttime "CO-QUI" sound produced by the frog was thought to correspond to a species of coquí that lived across the entire island, at high elevations and lower elevations alike (Schmidt, 1928; Thomas, 1966). However, in the winter of 1964–1965, Richard Thomas realized that the sound was produced by not one but two species. In 1966 Thomas published an article in which he established that the sample that Schmidt used to describe Eleutherodactylus portoricensis corresponded to a species that lives only in the higher elevations and which is today known as the coquí de montaña. Of the 16 species of coquí in Puerto Rico, this is the ninth species classified (Thomas & Joglar, 1996). There is no other scientific name for this species. The common name in Spanish is coquí de la montaña. However, there are other common names. In his catalogue of vertebrates in Puerto Rico, Vélez (1977) uses the common name "coquí montaño de Puerto Rico" (in English, "Puerto Rico mountain coquí"). In his book on the herpetofauna of Puerto Rico, Rivero (1978) uses the name "coquí de montaña". It is one of only two species to actually emit the "co-qui" sound, the other one being the common coquí. Above its eyes, this species has a white half-moon, and on its belly, it has dark brown spots. These characteristics make it easy to identify.

== Habitat ==
The mountain coquí's natural habitats are subtropical or tropical moist lowland forests and subtropical or tropical moist montane forests at elevations above 180 m. It has been documented in shrubs, palms, herbaceous plants, bromeliads, tree holes, and under rocks, trunks, roots, and leaf litter.

== Evolutionary history and conservation ==
The low-elevation Caguas Basin in eastern Puerto Rico has been a long-term barrier to gene flow between populations of E. portoricensis in the Luquillo and Cayey Mountains, with population divergence beginning more than 75,000 years ago. Stable population sizes over time indicate a lack of demographic response to climatic changes during the last glacial period. The results highlight the importance of topographic complexity in promoting within-island allopatric speciation in the Greater Antilles, and indicate long-term persistence and lineage diversification despite Quaternary climatic oscillations. The species has undergone considerable declines throughout its range and is listed as endangered. Captive breeding programs are being used to help conserve E. portoricensis.

== See also ==
- Fauna of Puerto Rico
- List of amphibians and reptiles of Puerto Rico
