= Hedrick's coquí =

Conservation status
- Endangered (IUCN 3.1)

Scientific classification
- Kingdom: Animalia
- Phylum: Chordata
- Class: Amphibia
- Order: Anura
- Clade: Brachycephaloidea
- Family: Eleutherodactylidae
- Genus: Eleutherodactylus
- Species: E. hedricki

Binomial name
- Eleutherodactylus hedricki Rivero, 1963

Species of amphibian

Hedrick's coquí, the treehole coquí, or coquí de Hedrick (Eleutherodactylus hedricki) is a species of frog in the family Eleutherodactylidae endemic to Puerto Rico. Its natural habitats are subtropical or tropical moist lowland forest and subtropical or tropical moist montane forest.

== History ==
E. hedricki was discovered in 1962, when finding a new species of frog seemed very improbable. It is named in honor of Hedrick J. Rivero at age 9, who declared himself assistant to his father and followed him through creeks, caves, and mountains during any time of the day or night.

== Description ==
Its distinctive features are the pronounced constriction in the back of the head (as if the waist were in the back of the head), a shallow furrow along the middle of the back from between the eyes to near the sacral hump, and the short, rounded snout. Other distinguishing but not necessarily exclusive characteristics are: the small eyes, with narrow upper eyelids, the uniformerly granular dorsum, the pair of light, externally concave lines on the back (not too distinct in very dark animals), the blackish throat of males, and the absence of dark streaks along the sides of the snout. The basic dorsal color may be brown or dark gray, almost uniform or with obscure variegation or vermiculations of lighter gray. The males average 32.8 mm in length, while females average 34.6 mm.

The treehole coqui is a mountain-dwelling, arboreal species that rests in and calls from holes and crevices in tree trunks and branches, often as high 20 or 30 ft from ground. The call of E. hedricki is a resonant "ping, ping, ping". The species may be heard during the day, but by midnight, most of the callers have become silent. The call has not been heard below about 1,000 ft.

== Distribution ==
The species is found in lower-elevation forest in the Luquillo Mountains (El Yunque), Cayey Mountain Range and Central Mountain Range.

== Sources ==
- Rivero, Juan A. 1998. The Amphibians and Reptiles of Puerto Rico. 2. ed. rev. Editorial de la Universidad de Puerto Rico
- Joglar, Rafael L. 1998. Los Coqus de Puerto Rico: Su Historia Natural y Conservaci. Editorial de la Universidad de Puerto Rico
- US Fish and wildlife service

== See also ==
- List of amphibians and reptiles of Puerto Rico
- Fauna of Puerto Rico
- List of endemic fauna of Puerto Rico

External audio
- Frog Vocal
- Hedrick's Coqui vocals
