= Cricket coquí =

Conservation status
- Critically Endangered (IUCN 3.1)

Scientific classification
- Kingdom: Animalia
- Phylum: Chordata
- Class: Amphibia
- Order: Anura
- Clade: Brachycephaloidea
- Family: Eleutherodactylidae
- Genus: Eleutherodactylus
- Species: E. gryllus

Binomial name
- Eleutherodactylus gryllus Schmidt, 1920

Species of amphibian

The cricket coquí, green coquí, or coquí grillo (Eleutherodactylus gryllus) is a species of frog in the family Eleutherodactylidae endemic to Puerto Rico. Its natural habitats are subtropical or tropical moist lowland forest and subtropical or tropical moist montane forest.

E. gryllus has not been recorded from Carite State Forest since 2016, prior to Hurricane Maria's landfall. It is also believed to be extirpated from Cordillera Central State Forest. The population in El Yunque National Forest is likely in decline. E. gryllus has disappeared from lower elevations, but was formerly found between 39 and 1,045 metres (128 and 3,428 ft) above sea level.

Threats that may be affecting this critically endangered species include deforestation, chytridiomycosis, climate change, including hurricane damage to habitat, and invasive species.

== See also ==
- Fauna of Puerto Rico
- List of amphibians and reptiles of Puerto Rico
