= Fauna of Puerto Rico =

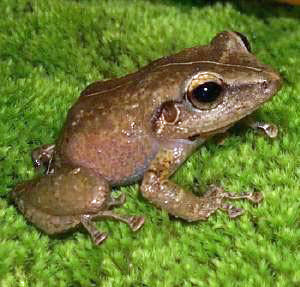
A common coquí (Eleutherodactylus coqui), arguably the most recognizable species of Puerto Rico's fauna

The fauna of Puerto Rico is similar to other island archipelago faunas, with high endemism, and low, skewed taxonomic diversity. Bats are the only extant native terrestrial mammals in Puerto Rico. All other terrestrial mammals in the area were introduced by humans, and include species such as cats, goats, sheep, the small Indian mongoose, and escaped monkeys. Marine mammals include dolphins, manatees, and whales. Of the 349 bird species, about 120 breed in the archipelago, and 47.5% are accidental or rare.

The most recognizable and famous animal of Puerto Rico is probably the common coquí, a small endemic frog, and one of the 86 species that constitute Puerto Rico's herpetofauna. Some native freshwater fish inhabit Puerto Rico, but some species, introduced by humans, have established populations in reservoirs and rivers. The low richness-high diversity pattern is also apparent among invertebrates, which constitutes most of the archipelago's fauna.

The arrival of the first people about 4,000 years ago and of Europeans more than 500 years ago, had a significant effect on Puerto Rico's fauna. Hunting, habitat destruction, and the introduction of non-native species to Puerto Rico led to extinctions and extirpations (local extinctions). Conservation efforts, the most notable being for the Puerto Rican parrot, began in the second half of the 20th century. According to IUCN, as of 2002, there were 21 threatened species in Puerto Rico: two mammals, eight breeding birds, eight reptiles, and three amphibians.

== Origin of Puerto Rican fauna ==
Geographic location of Puerto Rico

The Caribbean Plate, an oceanic tectonic plate on which Puerto Rico and the Antilles (with the exception of Cuba) lie, was formed in the late Mesozoic. According to Rosen, when South America separated from Africa, a volcanic archipelago known as "Proto-Antilles" was formed. It later divided into the present-day Greater and Lesser Antilles because of a new fault line in the "Proto-Antilles". Geologically, the archipelago of Puerto Rico is young, having formed about 135 Ma (million years) ago. The prevailing hypothesis, proposed by Howard Meyerhoff, posits that the Puerto Rican Bank, consisting of Puerto Rico, its outlying islands, and the Virgin Islands with the exception of St. Croix, was formed from volcanism in the Cretaceous Period. Rock samples from Sierra Bermeja in southwestern Puerto Rico, dated to the late Jurassic/early Cretaceous period, confirm this theory.

There is ongoing debate over when and how the ancestors of vertebrate fauna colonized the Antilles—particularly whether the Proto-Antilles were oceanic islands or whether they once formed a land connection between South and North America. The first, and prevailing, model favors overwater dispersal from continental, primarily South American, fauna; the other suggests the vicariance of proto-Antillean fauna. Hedges et al. conclude that dispersal was "the primary mechanism for the origin of West Indian biota". Vertebrate terrestrial genera such as Eleutherodactylus dispersed in a "filter" effect among the islands before any vicariant event occurred. However, other fauna such as the endemic Antillean insectivores (Nesophontes sp., Solenodon marcanoi and others) and freshwater fish appear to have colonized the West Indies earlier through other means. Woods provides evidence to support this hypothesis by analyzing the arrival of ancestors of the Antillean capromyids and echimyids, concluding that an ancient echimyid must have arrived on the Greater Antilles from South America either by island-hopping through the Lesser Antilles or by rafting either to Puerto Rico or Hispaniola.

MacPhee and Iturralde provide an alternate hypothesis that the initiators of land mammal clades arrived on the Proto-Antilles by the mid-Tertiary period, approximately at the Eocene–Oligocene boundary. A short-lived (~1 Ma) landmass named "GAARlandia" (Greater Antilles + Aves Ridge land) connected northwestern South America with three of the Greater Antilles (Cuba, Hispaniola and Puerto Rico) during this period. Afterwards, during the fragmentation of the Proto-Antilles, divergence of vicariated lines would have begun.

The last major changes in Puerto Rican fauna occurred about 10,000 years ago as a result of the post-Ice Age rise in sea level and associated environmental changes. Puerto Rico's transformation from a dry savanna environment to its present moist, forested state led to mass extinctions, especially of the vertebrate fauna. Around this time, the Puerto Rican Bank—a single landmass comprising the archipelago of Puerto Rico (except for Mona, Monito and Desecheo) and the Virgin Islands (except for St. Croix)—became separated. The Puerto Rican Bank has never been connected to its closest eastern bank, St. Maarten.

== Mammals ==
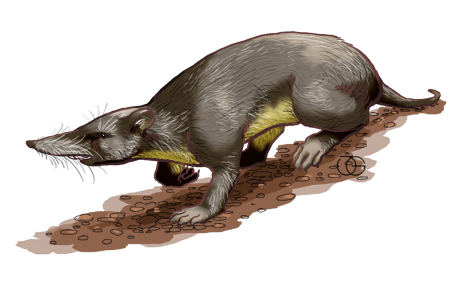
Artistic representation of the extinct Puerto Rican shrew

The richness of mammals in Puerto Rico, like many other islands, is low relative to mainland regions. The present-day native terrestrial mammal fauna of Puerto Rico is composed of only 13 species, all of which are bats. 18 marine mammals, including manatees, dolphins and whales, occur in Puerto Rican waters. Fossil records show the existence of one shrew (Puerto Rican shrew, Nesophontes edithae), one sloth (Puerto Rican sloth), three additional leaf-nosed bats (Macrotus waterhousii, Monophyllus plethodon, and Phyllonycteris major), and five rodents (one giant hutia: Elasmodontomys obliquus, one hutia: Isolobodon portoricensis and three spiny rats: Heteropsomys antillensis, Heteropsomys insulans, and Puertoricomys corozalus). Woods suggests a reason for their extinction: "Taxa evolving in isolation on oceanic islands without competition or predators may not be able to adapt to rapidly changing conditions, such as the extensive climatic fluctuations of the Ice Ages or sudden competition or predation from introduced animals".

Other terrestrial mammals have been introduced throughout the history of Puerto Rico. Indigenous settlers first introduced dogs and guinea pigs from South or Central America. Afterwards, Taínos introduced hutias as a food source from Hispaniola. When the Spanish colonized the island in the early 16th century, they introduced domesticated animals such as dogs, cats, goats, pigs, cattle, horses, and donkeys. Other species such as black rats (Rattus rattus), Norway rats (Rattus norvegicus) and house mice (Mus sp.) have been unintentionally introduced as stowaways, possibly since Christopher Columbus's arrival in 1493. More recently, species have been introduced as a means of biological pest control. For example, the small Indian mongoose (Urva auropunctata) was introduced in the 19th century to control the damage caused by rats in sugar cane plantations. The introduction was a failure: the mongoose failed to control the rat population and instead contributed to the decline of native fauna such as the yellow-shouldered blackbird and possibly the elfin-woods warbler.

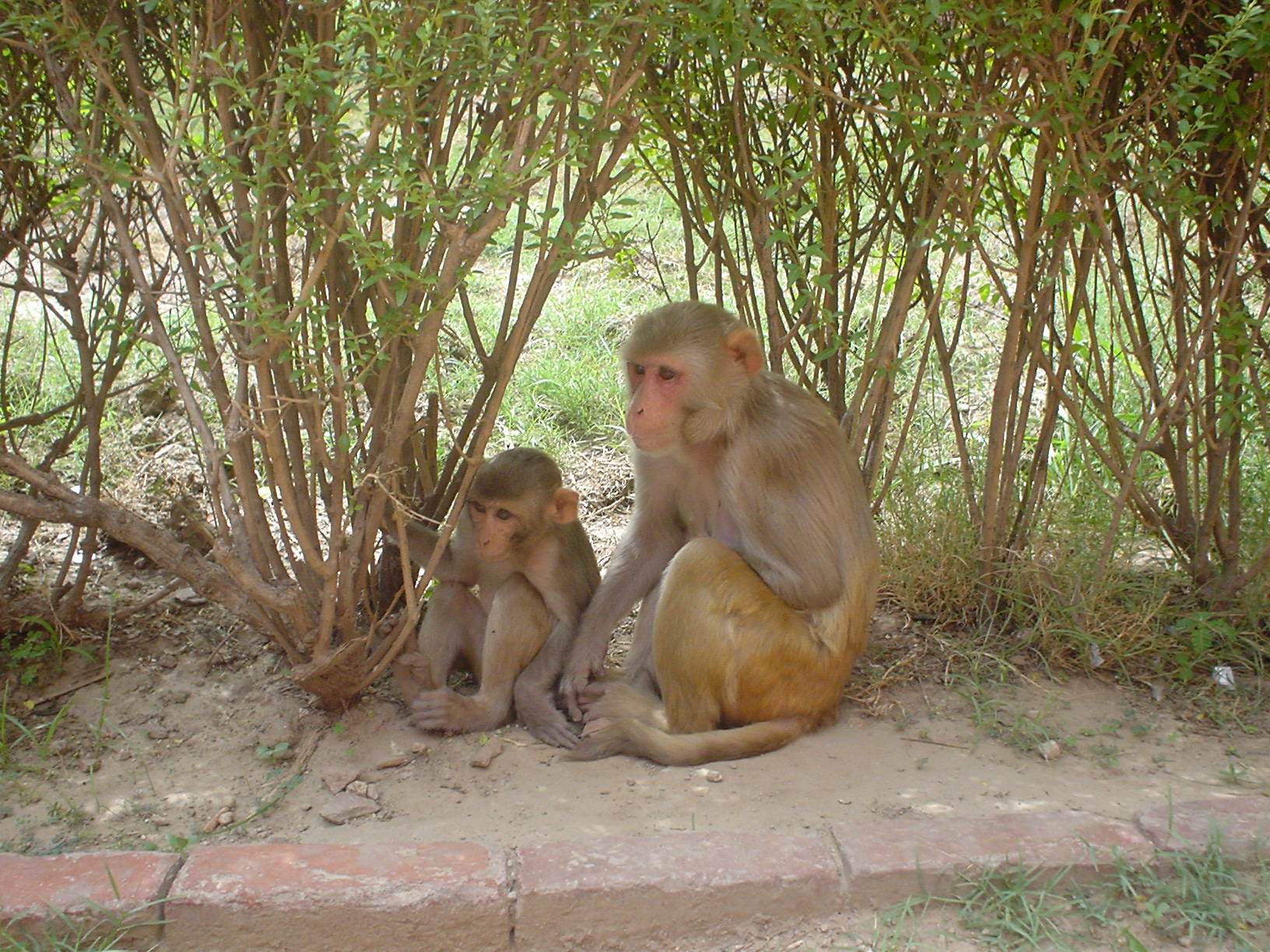
Rhesus macaques, a mammal introduced to Puerto Rico

As part of a study on adaptation, 57 rhesus macaques (Macaca mulatta) were introduced to the island of Desecheo and other southern off-shore islands and cays in 1967. Prior to the introduction, Desecheo was the largest nesting colony of the brown booby, but mainly as a result of egg predation by the introduced macaques, no bird species presently nests in the island. Efforts to trap and remove the species have been unsuccessful and it has expanded its range to southwestern Puerto Rico. Other primates also have established populations in Puerto Rico. As a result of vandalism, 107 squirrel monkeys escaped from a research station at Sabana Seca in the late 1970s. The latest estimate for this population is 35 individuals.

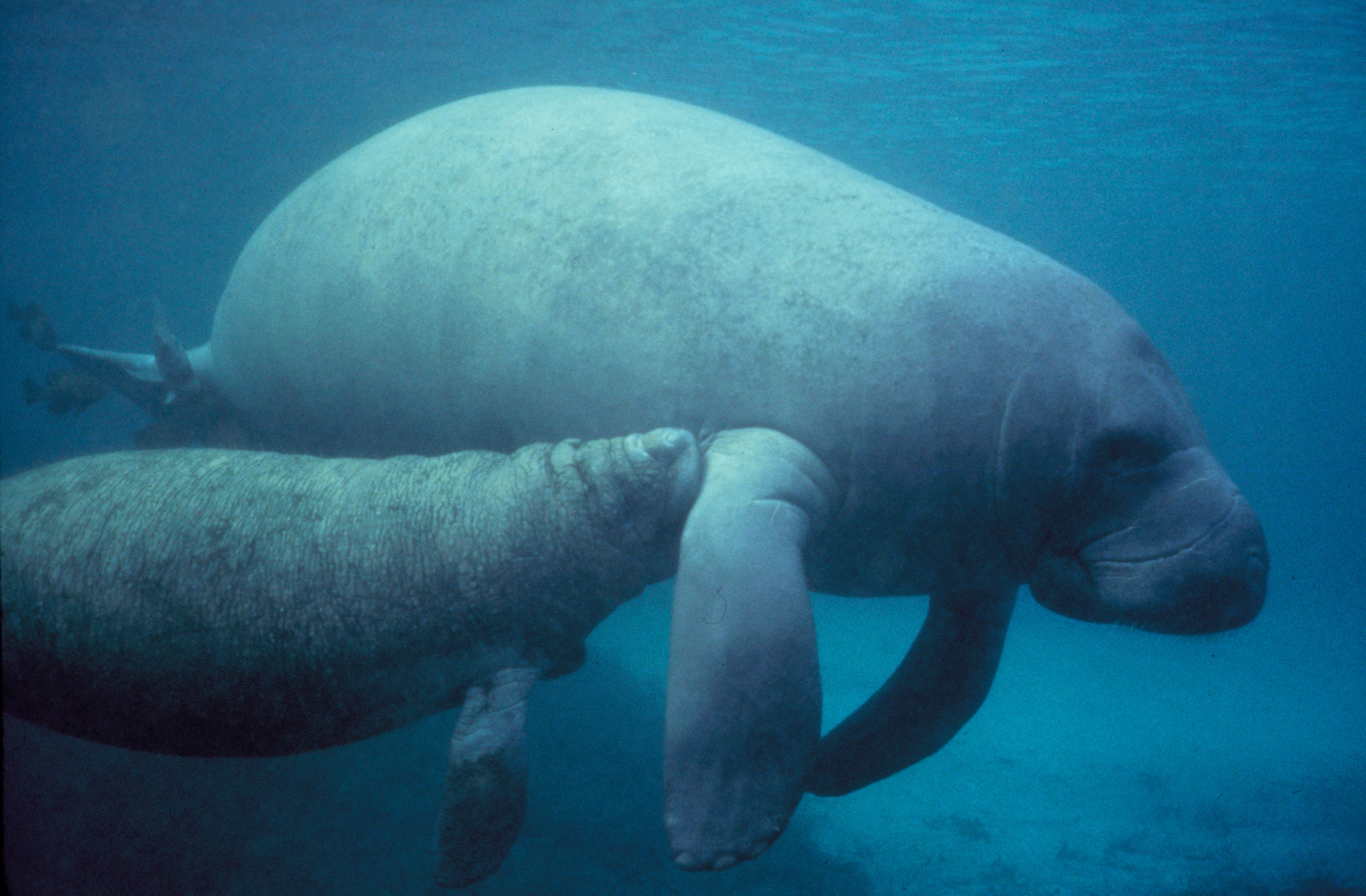
West Indian manatee, an aquatic mammal of Puerto Rico

Arguably the best known of aquatic mammals occurring in Puerto Rican waters is the Antillean manatee (Trichechus manatus manatus) which is listed as vulnerable by the IUCN. The archipelago's waters are one of the species' main breeding areas. Manatees gathered local media attention when a two-month manatee nicknamed Moisés was rescued and raised for 27 months by the Caribbean Stranding Network (CSN). Moisés was the first successful release of an orphaned, captive-raised manatee to the marine environment in the Caribbean. The animal became a Puerto Rican cultural, as well as scientific, icon when Tony Croatto wrote a song titled "Moisés". A municipality of Puerto Rico, Manatí is believed to be named after the species.

Puerto Rico's waters are also an important breeding site for the humpback whale during the Northern Hemisphere's winter. Humpback whale watching is a popular tourist attraction in the municipality of Rincón in western Puerto Rico.

=== Bats ===
Extant bats of Puerto Rico belong to five families (Noctilionidae, Mormoopidae, Phyllostomidae, Vespertilionidae, and Molossidae) and include a total of 13 species, of which six subspecies are endemic to the archipelago. Seven of the 13 species are insectivores, four can be considered frugivores, one species feeds on nectar and another on fish. The species total is a relatively low number in comparison to the other Greater Antilles. Jamaica, for example, with an area approximately 1.2 times that of Puerto Rico, has 21 species (1.6 times that of Puerto Rico). A possible explanation for this is the comparatively large distance between the archipelago and the mainland dispersion areas. Jamaica, for example, is closer to Cuba and Hispaniola which are themselves closer to the mainland dispersion areas of North and Central America.

Bats play an important role in forest and cave ecology in Puerto Rico and help control mosquito populations. Most species (10 of 13) are cave-dwellers with low reproductive rates; the area with the highest species richness is the Caribbean National Forest, where eleven species occur. The red fig-eating bat (red fruit bat), endemic to the Puerto Rican Bank, plays an important role in the ecology of tabonuco forest in the Luquillo Mountains since it is believed to be the only seed disperser of bulletwood (Manilkara bidentata). Cave ecosystems are enhanced by bat feces (guano) since many of the invertebrate cave fauna are either guano scavengers, detritivores or predators of the former two.

The bat species that occur in the archipelago of Puerto Rico are: greater bulldog bat (Noctilio leporinus), Antillean ghost-faced bat (Mormoops blainvillii), Parnell's mustached bat (Pteronotus parnellii), sooty mustached bat (Pteronotus quadridens), Jamaican fruit bat (Artibeus jamaicensis), Antillean fruit bat (Brachyphylla cavernarum), buffy flower bat (Erophylla sezekorni bombifrons), Leach's single leaf bat (Monophyllus redmani), red fruit bat (Stenoderma rufum), big brown bat (Eptesicus fuscus), eastern red bat (Lasiurus borealis), velvety free-tailed bat (Molossus molossus), and Mexican free-tailed bat (Tadarida brasiliensis).

== Birds ==
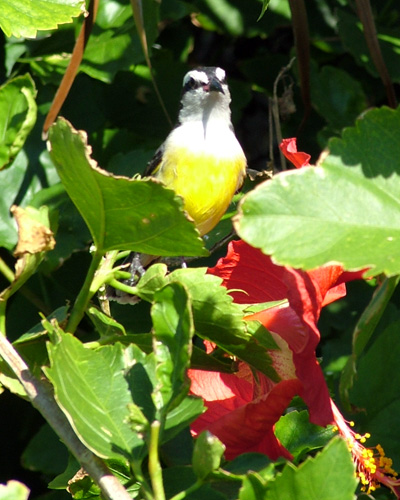
Bananaquit, the most abundant bird in Puerto Rico

The avifauna of Puerto Rico is composed of 349 species, 18 of which are endemic to the archipelago. Almost half of the species (166) are accidental, meaning that they have been sighted only once or twice, and 42 of the species have been introduced, either directly or indirectly (mainly through habitat alteration), by humans. Approximately 120 species, including both native and introduced, breed regularly in the archipelago.

The avifauna of the West Indies is predominantly of tropical North American (southern North America and Central America) origin with aggressive South American species having colonized the area only recently. The South American families occurring in the Greater Antilles are the hummingbirds (Trochilidae), tyrant flycatchers (Tyrannidae), bananaquit (Coerebidae) and tanagers (Thraupidae), all of which are represented in Puerto Rico. The prevailing theory suggests that bird fauna colonized the West Indies by transoceanic dispersal during the glacial periods of the Pleistocene. The most primitive West Indies birds are the todies which have an endemic representative in Puerto Rico, the Puerto Rican tody.

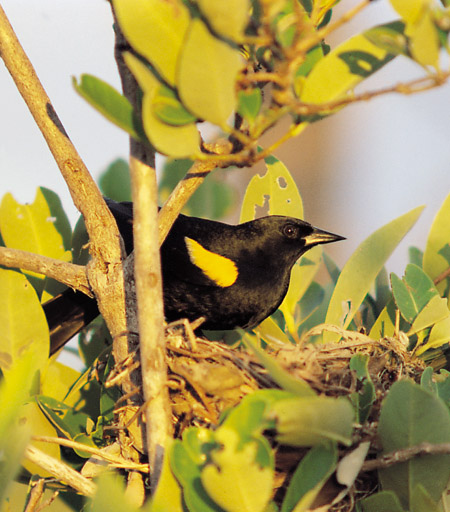
Yellow-shouldered blackbird, one of the 16 endemic birds of Puerto Rico

Puerto Rico's avifauna has diminished due to extinction and extirpation, either by natural forces or human intervention. For example, fossil evidence was discovered for a species of swift, Tachornis uranoceles, dated to the late Pleistocene (between 17,000 and 21,000 years ago). The species is believed to have become extinct as a result of habitat alteration after the Wisconsin glaciation. At least six endemic species have become extinct in the last millennia: Puerto Rican barn owl (Tyto cavatica), Puerto Rican caracara (Polyborus latebrosus), Puerto Rican conure (Aratinga chloroptera maugei), Puerto Rican woodcock (Scolopax anthonyi), Puerto Rican quail-dove (Geotrygon larva), and the Antillean cave rail (Nesotrochis debooyi). With a population of 13 individuals in 1975, the Puerto Rican parrot almost became the seventh, but conservation efforts helped save the species from extinction. However, it is still one of the ten most critically endangered birds in the world. Four Puerto Rican birds, the Hispaniolan parakeet, the white-necked crow, the Cuban crow, and the limpkin, became extirpated after Puerto Rico's population expansion in the latter half of the nineteenth century and three more species, the black-bellied whistling duck, the black rail, and the American flamingo, no longer breed in the archipelago.

== Amphibians and reptiles ==
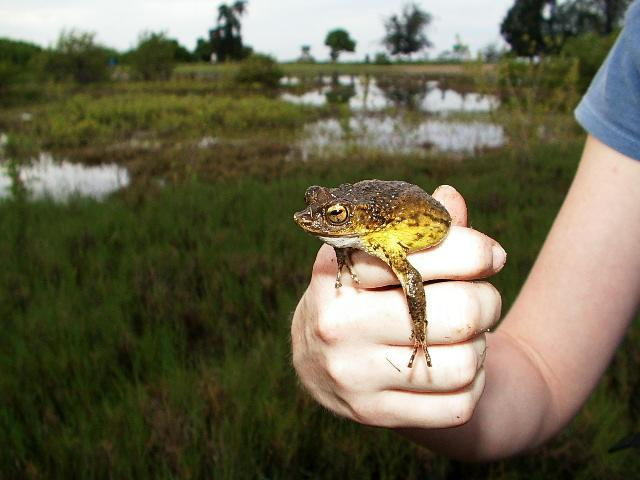
Puerto Rican crested toad, an endemic amphibian species of Puerto Rico

Puerto Rico's herpetofauna consists of 25 amphibian species and 61 reptile species. The majority of West Indian terrestrial reptile clade is believed to have arrived by flotsam dispersion from South America. Little evidence exists to support the alternative hypothesis of proto-Antillean vicariance. Other terrestrial herpetofauna are believed to have arrived to the West Indies (and Puerto Rico) by the same method and subsequently undergone vicariance by banks or islands. As a result, Puerto Rico, and the Caribbean in general, has one of the highest percentages of endemism among amphibians and reptiles in the world. Amphibian species in Puerto Rico belong to four families: Bufonidae (2 species), Hylidae (3), Leptodactylidae (18) and Ranidae (2). Reptiles include turtles (freshwater and marine), lizards, worm lizards, snakes and a caiman.

All species of Ranidae and Hylidae occurring in Puerto Rico are introduced. One species from the family Bufonidae, the cane toad, is introduced while the other, the Puerto Rican crested toad, is endemic and critically endangered. The cane toad was introduced to Puerto Rico in the 1920s to control the populations of white-grub (Phyllophaga spp.), a sugar cane pest. All species from the family Leptodactylidae are native to the region. Of the 18 Leptodactylidae species, 17 are from the genus Eleutherodactylus and are commonly known in Puerto Rico as coquís. Three of these, the web-footed coquí, the golden coqui and the mottled coqui, are likely to be extinct. The golden coqui is the only live-bearing species from the family Leptodactylidae and Cook's robber frog (E. cooki) is the only Eleutherodactylus sp. that exhibits sexual dimorphism in both size and color. The common coquí (Eleutherodactylus coqui) is an unofficial national symbol of Puerto Rico and an important aspect of Puerto Rican culture. Since 14 of the 17 coquís are endemic to the archipelago, a common phrase used by Puerto Ricans to assert their national pride is "De aquí como el coquí" (From here Puerto Rico like the coquí).

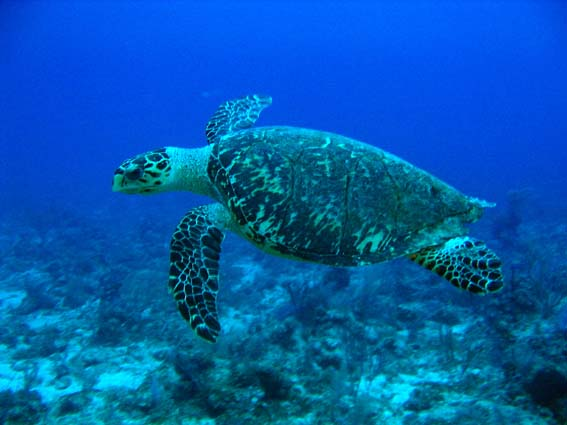
Hawksbill turtle, a critically endangered species

Puerto Rico's turtle fauna includes both freshwater (5 species, including two extinct species) and marine turtles (5). Two of these species, the hawksbill turtle and the leatherback sea turtle, are critically endangered. Threats to these species include habitat destruction and illegal capture of eggs and individuals. The spectacled caiman, an introduced species, is the only representative of the order Crocodilia in Puerto Rico.

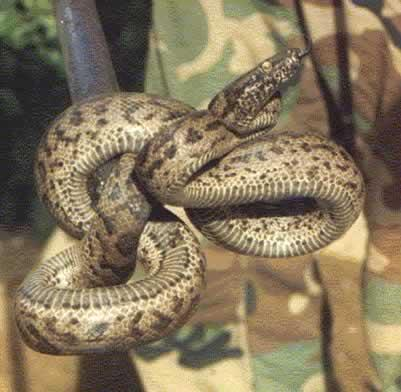
Puerto Rican boa, Puerto Rico's largest snake

The 11 snake species occurring in Puerto Rico are generally considered non-venomous, although research has concluded that at least one species, the Puerto Rican racer (Alsophis portoricensis), secretes venom. These species belong to 3 families and 4 genera: Typhlopidae (genus Typhlops), Boidae (Epicrates) and Colubridae (Alsophis and Arrhyton). The largest snake in Puerto Rico is the endemic Puerto Rican boa (Epicrates inornatus) with a maximum length of 12 ft (3.7 m). The diet of snakes in Puerto Rico consists of reptiles (Ameiva, Anolis, geckos), coquís and other frogs, and, to a lesser extent, mice, birds and bats (exclusively by the Puerto Rican Boa).

The largest terrestrial lizard of the archipelago of Puerto Rico is the Mona ground iguana (Cyclura stejnegeri). Previously considered a subspecies of the rhinoceros iguana (Cyclura cornuta), it is endemic to Mona Island, located in the Mona Passage between the main island of Puerto Rico and the Dominican Republic. Another Cyclura species of similar size, the Anegada ground iguana (Cyclura pinguis), once occurred in the archipelago but it became extirpated due to predation by dogs, cats, and humans, habitat destruction, and competition from goats and pigs, and is now restricted to Anegada. The most common lizard in Puerto Rico is the sharp-mouthed lizard (Anolis pulchellus). The anole lizards of Puerto Rico, and the Greater Antilles in general, represent an interesting case of adaptive radiation. Anole lizards in the Greater Antilles are more closely related to other species within the same island than to species of adjacent islands. Surprisingly, even though species divergence occurred independently on each island, the same set of ecomorphs (habitat specialists) have evolved on each island.

== Fish ==
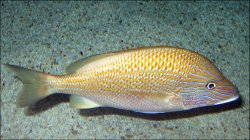
White grunt (Haemulon plumieri), one of the most common reef fish in the Caribbean

The first fish descriptions from Puerto Rico were compiled by Cuvier and Valenciennes in 1828. They reported 33 taxa for the archipelago. Puerto Rico has few native freshwater fish species; however, there are over 30 introduced species, mainly originating from Africa, South America and the southeastern United States, have established populations, and 60 marine species use Puerto Rico's freshwater bodies intermittently during the year. Introductions have been intentional and accidental. The purposes of intentional introductions have been sport fishing for recreation and food, mosquito control, and to provide baitfish for largemouth bass. Accidental introductions, such as the sailfin armored catfish (Pterygoplichthys multiradiatus), are mainly attributed to the release of aquarium fish. Since 1936, the Puerto Rican Department of Natural and Environmental Resources runs a hatchery at the municipality of Maricao. About 25,000 fish, including largemouth bass, peacock bass, and channel catfish, and some turtle species are raised annually to stock Puerto Rico's reservoirs and rivers.

Three types of habitats, mangroves, reefs and seagrasses, are found in Puerto Rico's ocean waters. A total of 677 fish species live in these habitats; 242 being reef species. Fish species found in Puerto Rican reefs are representative of the general Caribbean fauna. Common reef fishes include wrasses, damselfishes, white grunts (Haemulon plumieri), bluestriped grunts (Haemulon sciurus), queen parrotfish (Scarus vetula), and sharks (family Carcharhinidae). Sea breams (Archosargus rhomboidalis) and yellowfin mojarras (Gerres cinereus) are some of the species commonly found in mangrove habitats. Other species of interest include flatfishes, with 21 recorded species, and sharks, with more than 20 species. Oceanic whitetip sharks and silky sharks are common in the Mona Passage.

== Invertebrates ==
The invertebrate fauna of Puerto Rico is high in richness but low in diversity relative to mainland neotropical faunas of similar size and habitat diversity. Puerto Rico, in comparison to other Antillean islands, is the most extensively studied in regards to invertebrates.

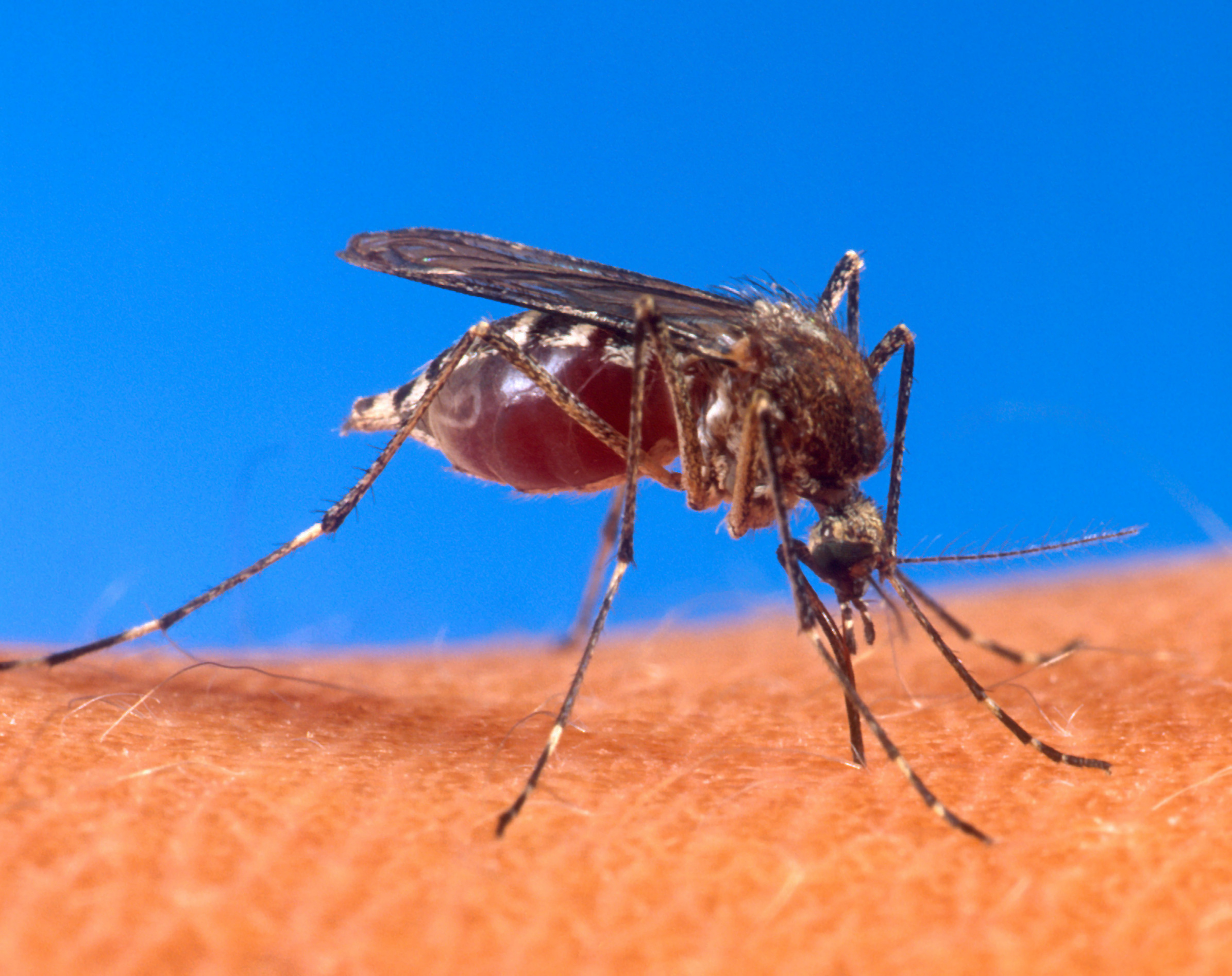
Aedes aegypti, arguably the best-known mosquito of Puerto Rico and host of the dengue and CHIKV viruses

Puerto Rico's insect fauna, similar to the majority of major invertebrate taxa in the archipelago, is considered depauperate when compared to its mainland counterparts. For example, approximately 300 species of butterfly occur in Puerto Rico, in contrast to more than 600 species in Trinidad and more than 1,500 species documented from a 7.5 km^{2} region in Brazil. As of 1998, out of the estimated 925,000 described insect species, only 5,573 were documented from Puerto Rico. In terms of diversity, of the 31 extant insect orders, 27 have representatives in Puerto Rico. The orders without reported representatives are Microcoryphia, Grylloblattaria, Plecoptera, and Mecoptera. The largest insect depository in Puerto Rico resides at the Museo de Entomología y Biodiversidad Tropical (Museum of Entomology and Tropical Biodiversity), part of the Agricultural Experimental Station of the University of Puerto Rico.

Arachnids are important to the forest ecology, as both predators and prey. In some forest types, such as tabonuco forest, they are the major arboreal invertebrate predators; spiders being the most abundant representative. The Maricao Commonwealth Forest's 27 spider species belong to five families: Uloboridae, Pholcidae, Theridiidae, Linyphiidae and Araneidae. Theotima minutissima, a small spider species found in abundance in the Caribbean National Forest, is believed to be parthenogenetic, meaning that it reproduces without fertilization by a male.

Other terrestrial invertebrates described from Puerto Rico include earthworms and cave dwelling animals. Eighteen native species of earthworm have been described, with 11 species belonging to the family Glossoscolecidae, 3 to the family Megascolecidae, and 4 to the family Exxidae. Seventy-eight invertebrate species are known to inhabit Puerto Rico's caves. Six of these species are restricted to the Antilles, 23 come from North America and 23 are endemic to Puerto Rico. Only two of the species are confirmed as troglobites, or restricted to caves. Forty-five percent of the species are predators while the remaining 55% are guano scavengers, detritivores and herbivores. It is believed that most of this fauna arrived at Puerto Rico in the Pleistocene.

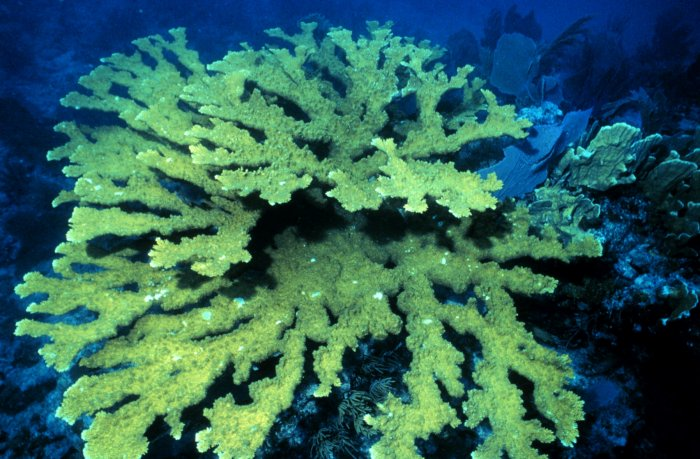
Elkhorn coral, listed as threatened under the Endangered Species Act in 2006

The marine invertebrate fauna of Puerto Rico is composed of 61 sponges, 171 cnidarians, 8 nemerteans, 1,176 mollusks, 129 annelids (polychaetes), 342 crustaceans, 165 echinoderms, 131 bryozoans, 117 hard corals, 99 soft corals and gorgonians, 13 corallimorphs, and 8 hydrocorals. Coral species found in Puerto Rican reefs are representative of the general Caribbean fauna. Commonly occurring corals include boulder star coral (Montrastaea annularis), finger coral (Porites porites), and elkhorn coral (Acropora palmata).

Invertebrate introductions have had an observable effect on Puerto Rican fauna. Native freshwater snails such as Physa cubensis have been adversely affected by introduced species. Currently, the most abundant freshwater snail in Puerto Rico is the Quilted Melania (Tarebia granifera), an introduced species. Another invertebrate introduced to Puerto Rico is the honeybee. This animal competes with the endangered Puerto Rican parrot for secondary nesting cavities at the Caribbean National Forest. Africanized bees, which pose an even greater threat for secondary cavity nesters, have recently extended their range to Puerto Rico. Other introductions include 18 species of ant, one of the most abundant taxa in leaf litter habitats.

== Human effect and conservation ==
The fauna of Puerto Rico has been subjected to human influence since the arrival of the Ortoiroid, Puerto Rico's first settlers, approximately 4,000 years ago. The native fauna was used by the island's indigenous population as a source of food, while others were used for skins and trade. Significant declines in the populations and diversity of the islands fauna are believed to have begun after the arrival of European settlers in the sixteenth century. Habitat destruction, primarily as a result of forest clearing for sugar cane plantations, had a devastating effect on Puerto Rican fauna during the latter half of the nineteenth century. Furthermore, human-introduced species such as rats, cats, the small Asian mongoose, and the cane toad have had a profound effect on the native fauna of Puerto Rico. Rats on Monito Island are believed to be a limiting factor on the abundance of the endemic Monito gecko, feral cats on Mona Island have been documented attacking common ground doves and endemic reptiles, and have been associated with the reduction of Mona ground iguana juveniles, and mongooses have been documented preying on Puerto Rican parrot fledglings.

Conservation efforts include both land and species protection. Approximately 8.95 km^{2} (equal to 3.4% of total land area) divided among 34 reserves are protected in Puerto Rico. According to the IUCN there are 21 threatened species in Puerto Rico: 2 mammals, 8 breeding birds, 8 reptiles, and 3 amphibians. The U.S. federal government lists 5 mammals, 2 amphibians, 8 birds, and 10 reptiles under the Federal Endangered Species Act. The Puerto Rican government, through the Department of Natural and Environmental Resources (DNER), produces its own threatened species list which includes 18 critically endangered species (3 amphibians, 7 birds, 3 reptiles, 2 fish and 3 invertebrates), and 14 endangered species. The DNER follows the IUCN classification scheme for species' priority assignment.

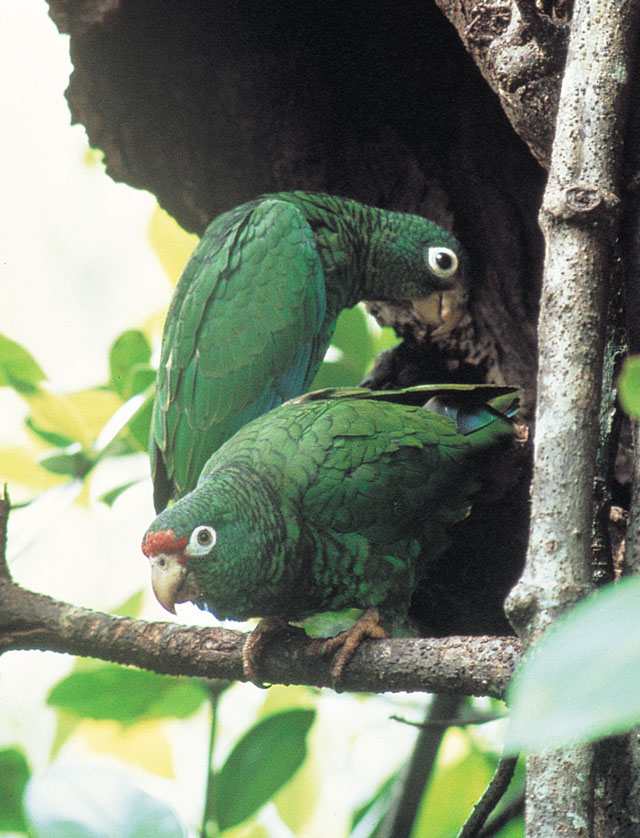
Puerto Rican parrot. Conservation efforts have saved this species from extinction.

Birds currently receive the greatest attention in regards to conservation. Arguably the most successful fauna recovery plan in Puerto Rico was the Puerto Rican Parrot Recovery Plan. Initiated in 1968, its main objective was to downlist the Puerto Rican parrot's status from critical to threatened by 2020. Other objectives include the establishment of two separate, effective, wild populations (500 or more individuals for 5 years), the protection of habitat for those populations and the control of predators, parasites and competitors of the species. Currently, the total wild parrot population is estimated at 44 individuals, and 105 birds are in captivity. This program was fundamental in raising ecological awareness in Puerto Rico.

The Puerto Rico Breeding Bird Survey (PRBBS), established in 1997, is a program with the purpose of monitoring the status and trends of Puerto Rican breeding bird populations. The information gathered by these surveys is used by the U.S. Fish and Wildlife Service (USFWS) to assess bird conservation priorities. Other conservation programs by the USFWS include the Puerto Rico and U.S. Virgin Islands Migratory Bird Conservation and the maintenance of 5 wildlife refuges at Cabo Rojo, Laguna Cartagena, Vieques, Culebra and Desecheo. Other institutions supporting bird conservation in Puerto Rico are the Puerto Rican Ornithological Society and the Puerto Rico National History Association.

Marine conservation has recently garnered support in Puerto Rico. The archipelago has an estimated 700 miles (1,126.5 km) of coastline and 1,300 mi^{2} (3,370 km^{2}) of coral reef communities. The Department of Natural Resources of Puerto Rico maintains 25 areas with marine components but only two of these (11 km^{2}) are designated as no-take zones. All turtle species occurring in Puerto Rico's waters are classified as either endangered or threatened. Earthwatch-supported turtle conservation programs and U.S. federal programs have raised local awareness and have contributed to the decline of egg-poaching and turtle meat consumption.

== See also ==
- List of endemic fauna of Puerto Rico
- List of Vieques birds

== Bibliography ==
- Douglas P. Reagan; Robert B. Waide, eds. (1996). The Food Web of a Tropical Rain Forest. University Of Chicago Press. ISBN 978-0-226-70600-9.
- Clive Wilkinson, ed. (2004). Status of coral reefs of the world. IUCN. Archived from the original on 2012-11-13.
- M.R. Gannon; M. Rogriguez-Duran; A. Kurta; M.R Willig. "The Bats of Puerto Rico". Archived from the original on April 21, 2006.
- Placer, José (Summer 1998). "The Bats of Puerto Rico – Bats have few friends on the island of Puerto Rico, but the dedicated few are working hard for their survival". Bats Magazine. 16 (2): 13–15.
- "The Geology of Puerto Rico". Archived from the original on July 21, 2006.
- Albert Schwartz (1991). Amphibians and Reptiles of the West Indies: Descriptions, Distributions, and Natural History. Univ Pr of Florida. ISBN 978-0-8130-1049-6.
- Charles L. Hogue (1993). Latin American Insects and Entomology. University of California Press. ISBN 978-0-520-07849-9.
- Juan A. Rivero (1998). Los anfibios y reptiles de Puerto Rico. San Juan, Puerto Rico: University of Puerto Rico Press. ISBN 978-0-8477-0243-5.
