= Pico del Este (Sierra de Luquillo) =

Mountain peak in Puerto Rico

Coordinates: 18°16′06″N 65°45′31″W

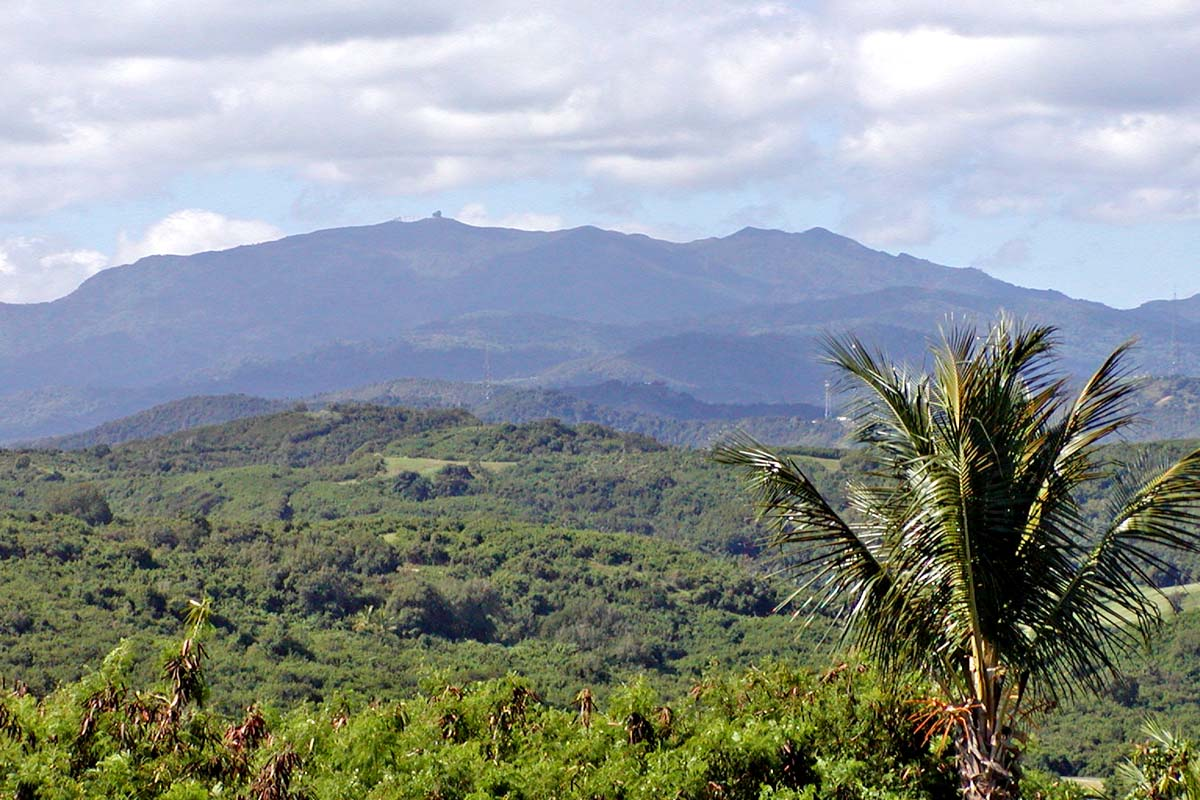
- Pico del Este as seen from the north.

Highest point
- Elevation: 3,436 ft (1,047 m)
- Prominence: 968 ft (295 m)
- Parent peak: El Toro

Naming
- Etymology: "peak of the east" in Spanish

Geography
- Location: Ceiba, Puerto Rico and Naguabo, Puerto Rico
- Parent range: Sierra de Luquillo

Pico del Este (Spanish for peak of the east) is a mountain peak in the southern portion of the Sierra de Luquillo, located on the boundary between the municipalities of Ceiba and Naguabo in eastern Puerto Rico. A radar complex built by the US Navy can be found in the summit of the mountain. Known as the Old Navy Radar, these facilities remain decommissioned and abandoned.

== Geography ==
Pico del Este and, its neighboring peak, Pico del Oeste are located within El Yunque National Forest on a mountain massif that is connected to El Yunque through a northwestward ridge known as Cuchilla el Duque.

== Gallery ==
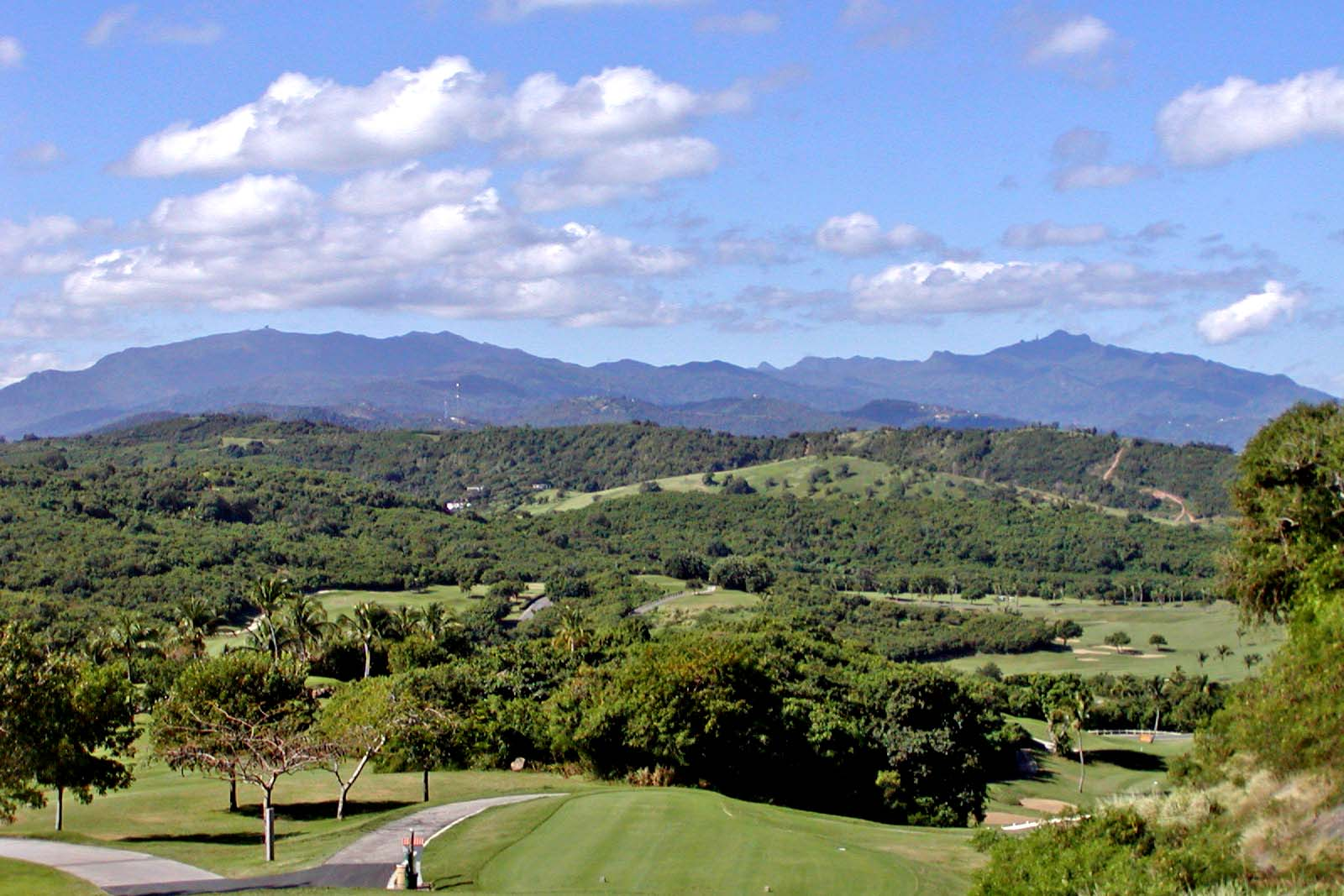
Pico del Este (left) and El Yunque (right) massifs as seen from the north.

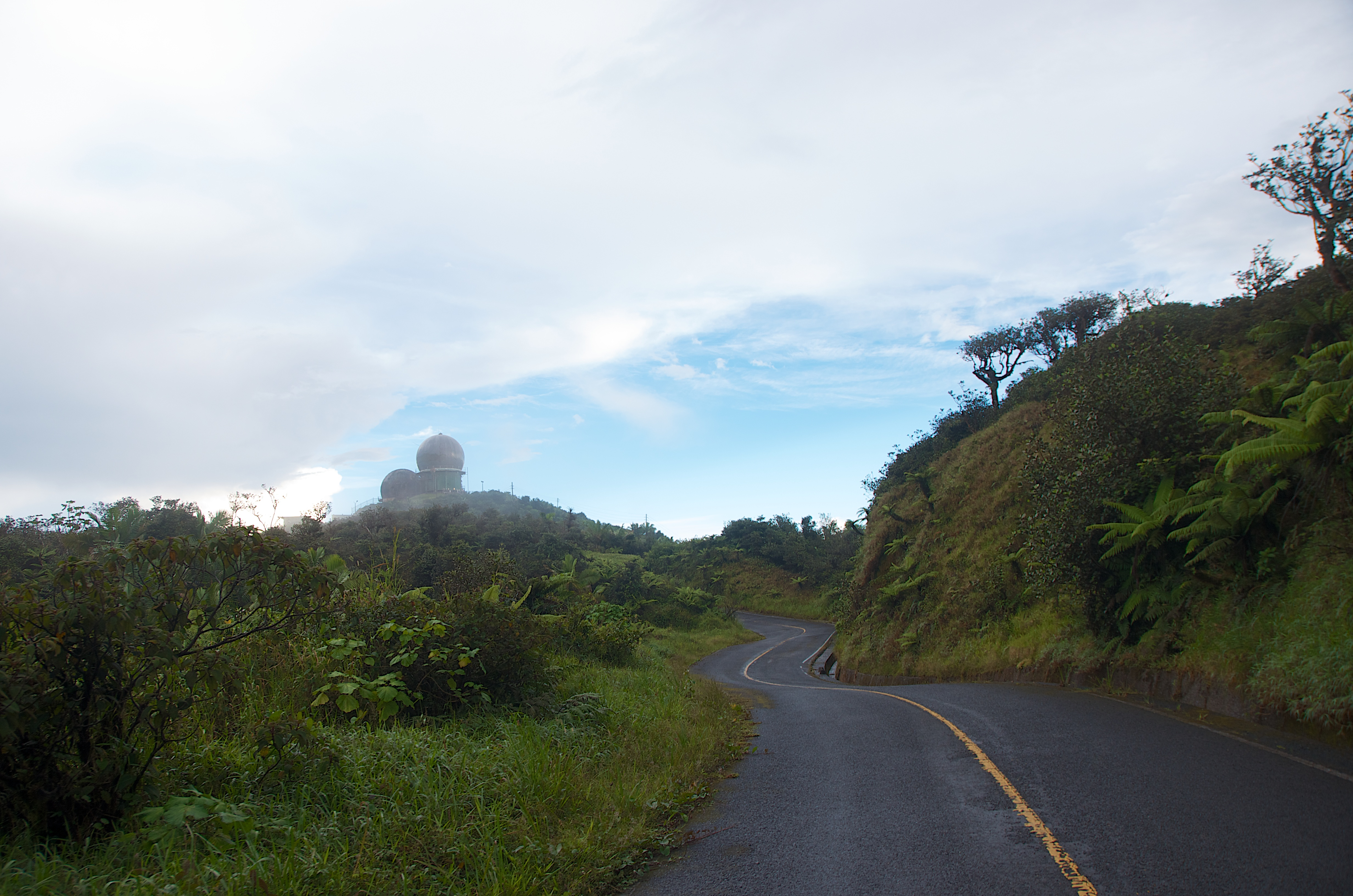
Old Navy Radars on the summit of Pico del Este.

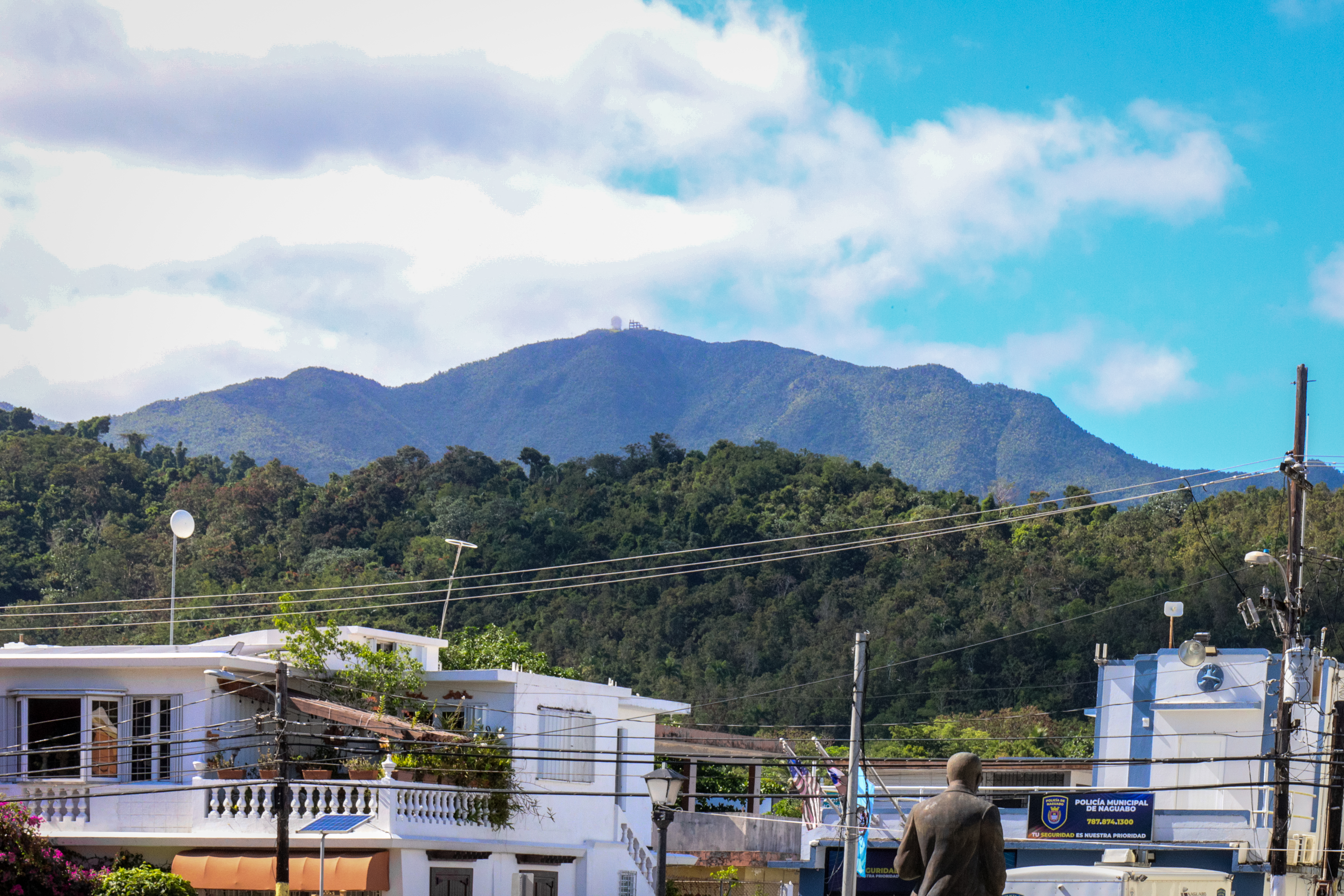
View from Naguabo Pueblo
