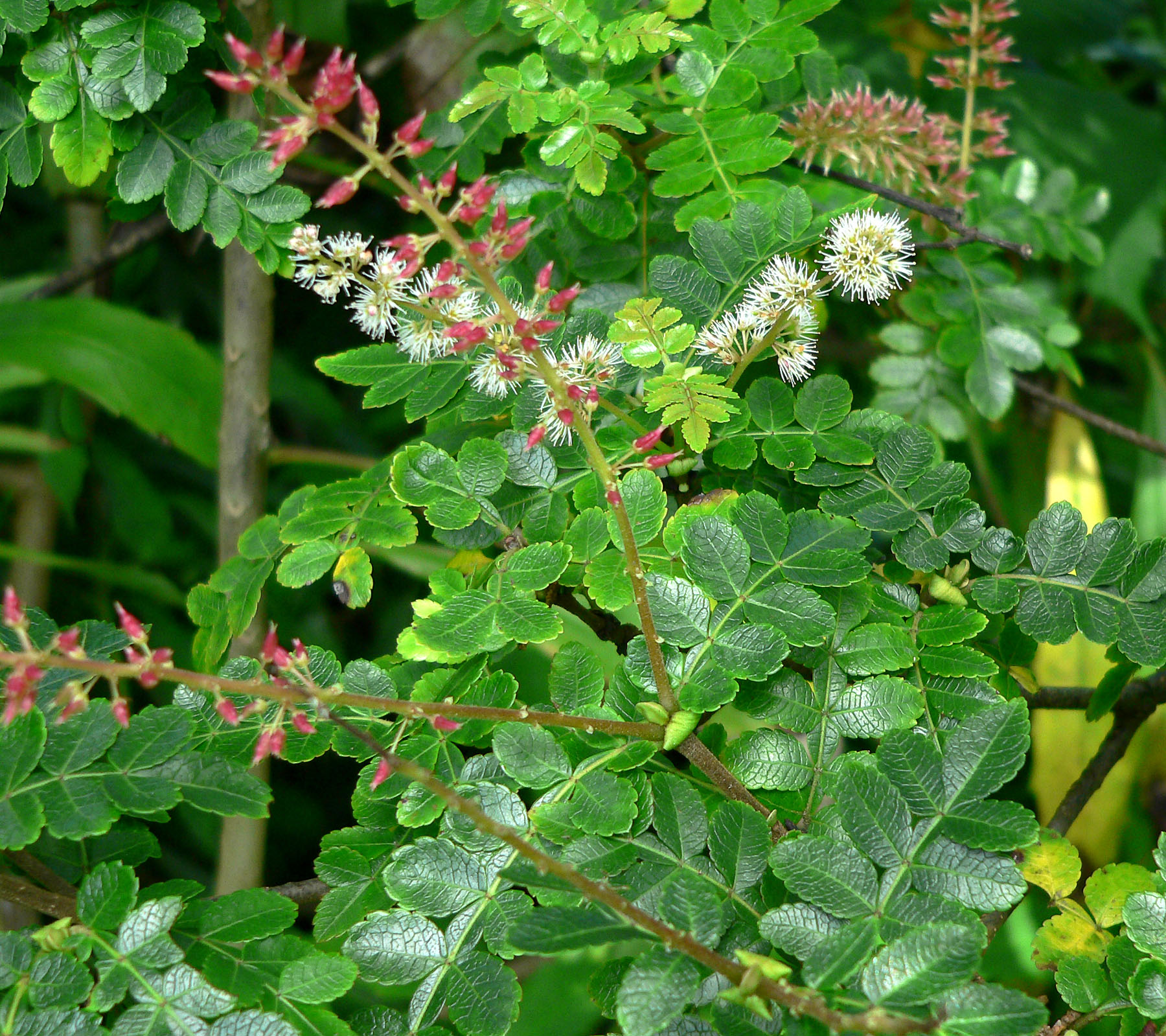
- Leaves and inflorescences

Conservation status
- Least Concern (IUCN 3.1)

Scientific classification
- Kingdom: Plantae
- Clade: Tracheophytes
- Clade: Angiosperms
- Clade: Eudicots
- Clade: Rosids
- Order: Oxalidales
- Family: Cunoniaceae
- Genus: Weinmannia
- Species: W. pinnata

Binomial name
- Weinmannia pinnata L.

Synonyms
- Synonymy: Weinmannia alpestris Macfad.; Weinmannia antioquensis Engl.; Weinmannia caripensis Kunth; Weinmannia glabra var. antioquensis (Engl.) Bernardi; Weinmannia glabra var. caripensis (Kunth) Engl.; Weinmannia glabra var. mexicana Pamp.; Weinmannia hirta Sw.; Weinmannia hirta var. antillana Pamp.; Weinmannia hirta var. brasiliensis Pamp.; Weinmannia hirta f. guadalupensis Pamp.; Weinmannia hirta f. nitida Pamp.; Weinmannia hirtella Kunth; Weinmannia intermedia var. pittieri Pamp.; Weinmannia laxiflora Pamp.; Weinmannia liebmannii Engl.; Weinmannia nervosa Killip; Weinmannia nitida D.Don; Weinmannia nitida Hieron., nom. illeg. homonym. post.; Weinmannia pinnata var. caripensis (Kunth) Cuatrec.; Weinmannia pinnata f. nitida Cuatrec.; Weinmannia stuebelii Hieron.; Weinmannia weberbaueri Diels; Windmannia hirtella (Kunth) Kuntze; Windmannia nitida Hieron.}; Windmannia pinnata (L.) Kuntze

= Weinmannia pinnata =

Species of tree

Weinmannia pinnata, commonly known as the bastard briziletto, is a species of tree in the family Cunoniaceae. It is native to Mexico, Central America, South America and the West Indies. It typically grows in wet habitats at high elevations, and is one of the species found in dwarf forests perpetually wreathed in clouds.

== Description ==
Weinmannia pinnata is a large shrub some 2 to 4 m (7 to 13 ft) tall which sometimes grows into a small tree. The trunk can reach 30 cm (12 in) in diameter and the bark exudes an astringent gum. The pinnate leaves are up to 10 cm (4 in) long and are stalkless. They are arranged in opposite pairs and have a winged midrib. The nine to twenty leaflets are oval, have serrated margins and rusty-brown hairs on the underside. The small flowers are in 10 cm (4 in) spikes similar to those of the bottlebrush; the buds are tinged pink and the flowers are white with pink centres. The fruits are dry and red, and divided in two parts. They are tipped by the remains of the long style.

== Distribution and habitat ==
In South America the species' range includes Colombia, Bolivia, Peru and Ecuador and in Central America it ranges from Panama to Guatemala. It is also native to Mexico. In the Caribbean it is present on the arc of islands from Cuba to St Lucia. It grows in wet mountain forests; in Guatemala its elevation range is 2,000 to 3,100 m (6,600 to 10,200 ft). Along with Prestoea montana, Brunellia comocladifolia and Podocarpus coriaceus, it is present in the wet cloud forests on the ridges and summits of the Sierra de Luquillo mountains in Puerto Rico.
