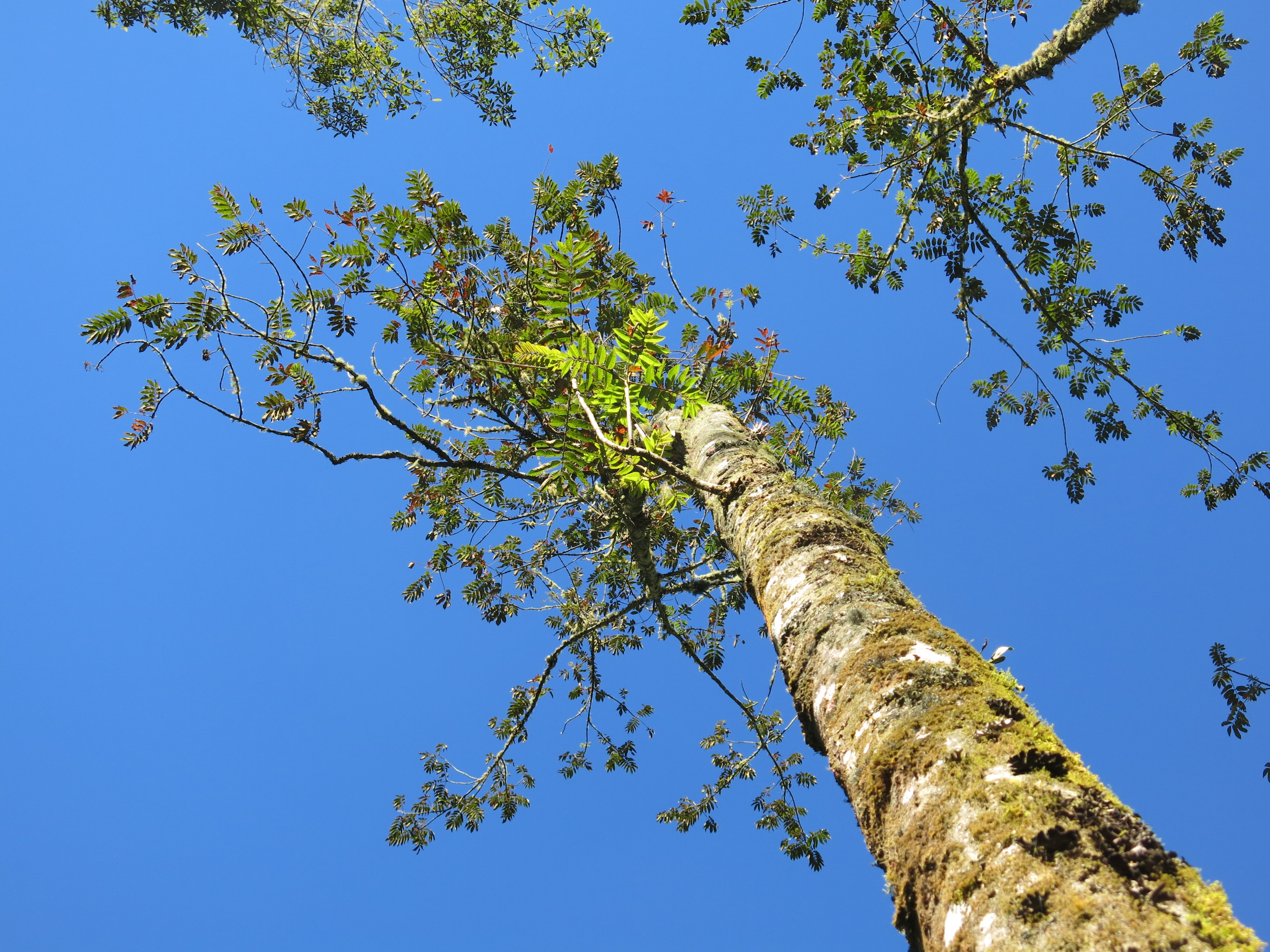
- In Sierra de Bahoruco National Park, Dominican Republic

Conservation status
- Least Concern (IUCN 3.1)

Scientific classification
- Kingdom: Plantae
- Clade: Tracheophytes
- Clade: Angiosperms
- Clade: Eudicots
- Clade: Rosids
- Order: Oxalidales
- Family: Brunelliaceae
- Genus: Brunellia
- Species: B. comocladifolia

Binomial name
- Brunellia comocladifolia Humb. & Bonpl.

= Brunellia comocladifolia =

Species of flowering plant

Brunellia comocladifolia, commonly known as the West Indian sumac, is a species of tree in the family Brunelliaceae. It is native to Central America, the West Indies, and northern South America.

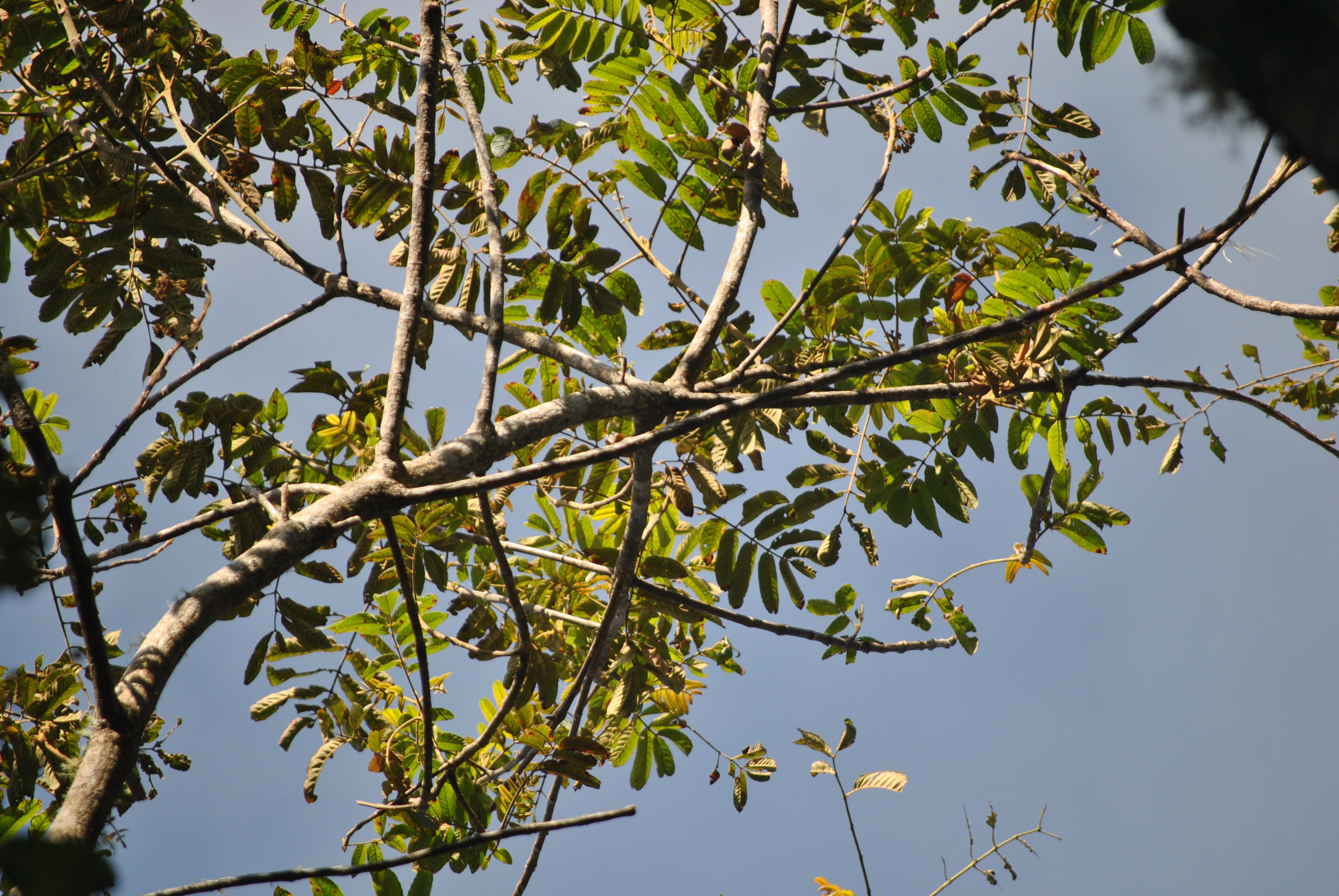
Branches and foliage

== Description ==
Brunellia comocladifolia is a small tree growing to a height of about 25 m (80 ft) with a spreading crown. The leaves and young shoots are clad in rusty coloured hairs and the foliage often has a reddish tinge. The pinnate leaves have toothed margins and are up to 40 cm (16 in) long. They are in opposite pairs, with five to eleven pairs of elliptical to oblong leaflets and a terminal leaflet. The leaflets have rounded bases and acuminate tips and are up to 15 cm (6 in) long and 6 cm (2 in) wide. The underside of the leaflets are clad in short, velvety hairs. Male and female flowers are on separate trees. They are both very small and are borne in panicles clad in short hairs. The flowering period is April to August and the fruits appear from June to October.

== Distribution and habitat ==
Brunellia comocladifolia is native to the West Indies, Central America and the extreme north of South America. Its range includes the countries of Colombia, Costa Rica, Cuba, Hispaniola (in both the Dominican Republic and Haiti), Ecuador, Guadeloupe, Jamaica, Puerto Rico and Venezuela. It is a montane species, found in clearings and on forest margins at altitudes of between 1,060 and 1,710 m (3,500 and 5,600 ft). Along with Weinmannia pinnata, Prestoea montana, and Podocarpus coriaceus, it is present in the wet cloud forest in the Sierra de Luquillo mountains in Puerto Rico. Brunellia comocladifolia also occurs in the Hispaniolan moist forests of the Dominican Republic and Haiti.
