= El Yunque (Puerto Rico) =

Mountain in Puerto Rico

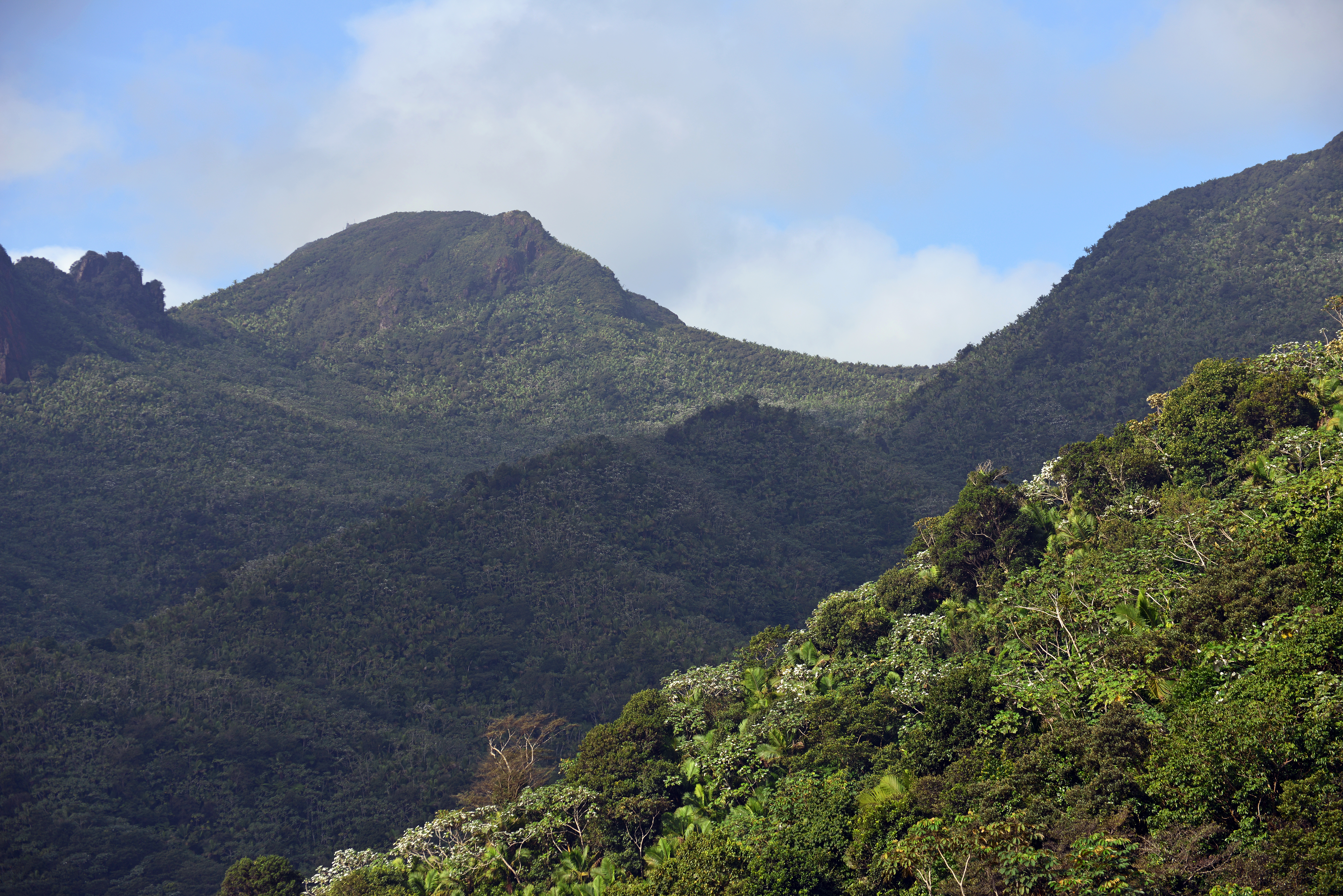
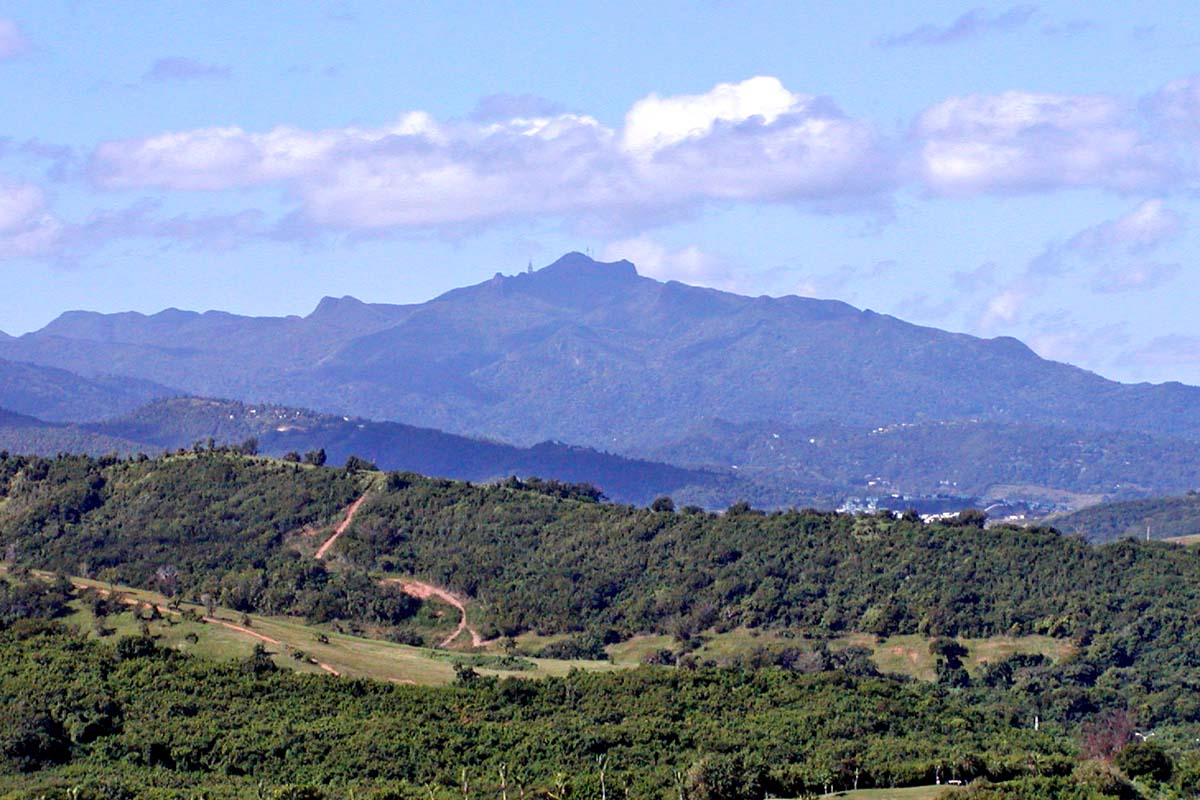
- Eastern view of El Yunque Peak from Yokahú Tower in El Yunque National Forest Eastern view of El Yunque peak from Fajardo

Highest point
- Elevation: 1,065 m (3,494 ft)
- Prominence: 305 m (1,001 ft)
- Parent peak: El Toro
- Coordinates: 18°18′38″N 65°47′29″W

Naming
- Etymology: Yúcahu phonetic Spanish transliteration of Taíno possibly meaning 'white land' and/or El Yunque meaning 'the anvil' in Spanish due to the shape of the mountain range when seen from the south.

Geography
- Location within Puerto Rico
- Location: Río Grande, Puerto Rico
- Parent range: Sierra de Luquillo

Climbing
- Easiest route: Hike

El Yunque or El Yunque Peak (Spanish: Pico El Yunque) (Taíno: Yukiyu) is a mountain located within the tropical rainforest of the El Yunque National Forest in the Sierra de Luquillo subrange of the Cordillera Central mountain range in the main island of Puerto Rico. Located in the northeastern coastal municipality of Río Grande in the center of the forest immediately next to Los Picachos peak, it reaches 1,065 m (3,494 ft), making the second-highest peak in the forest, after El Toro, which peaks at 1,074 m (3,524 ft) on the town boundary between Río Grande and Las Piedras in the southwest of the forest.

== Background ==
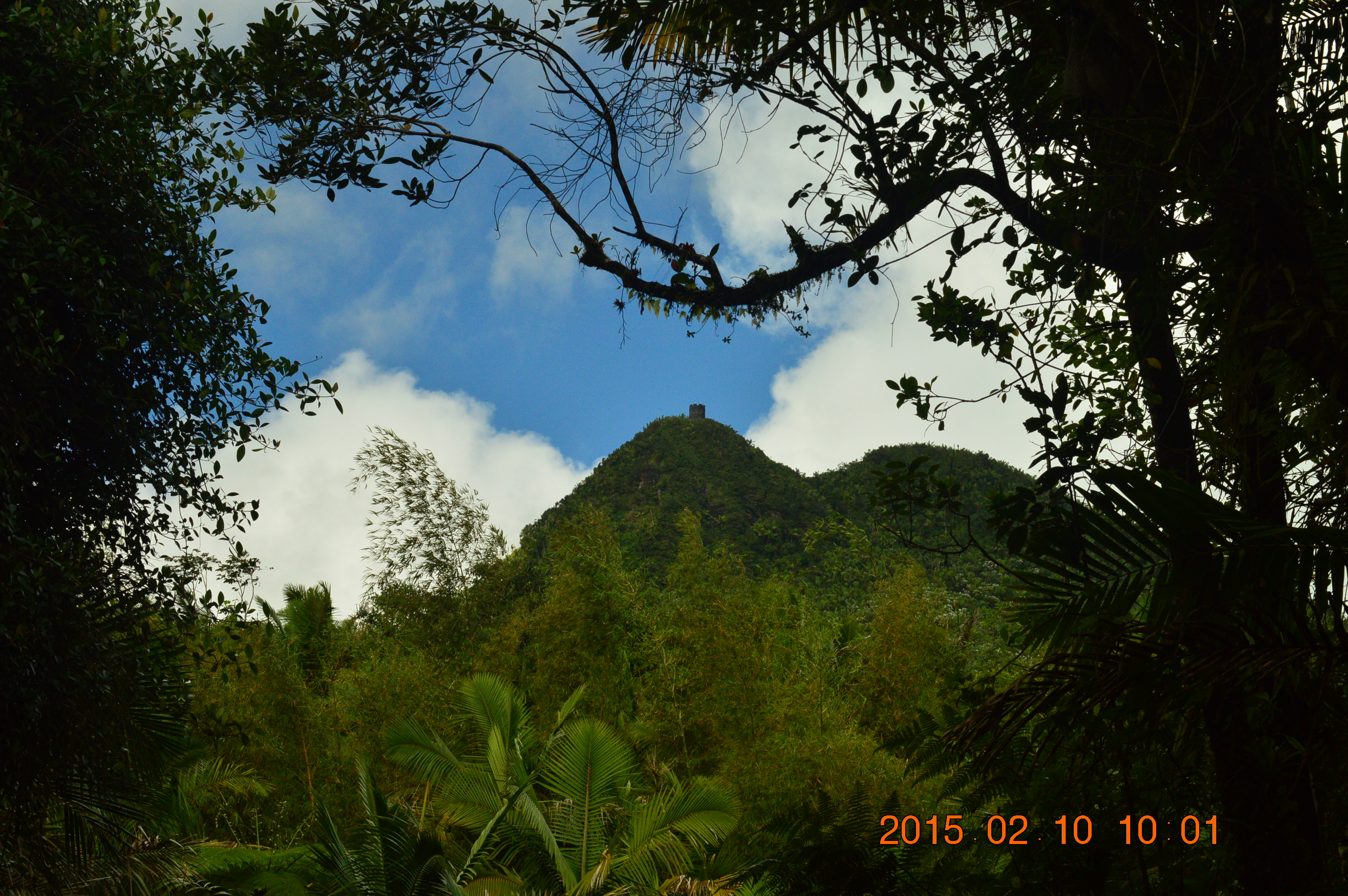
View of Mt Britton

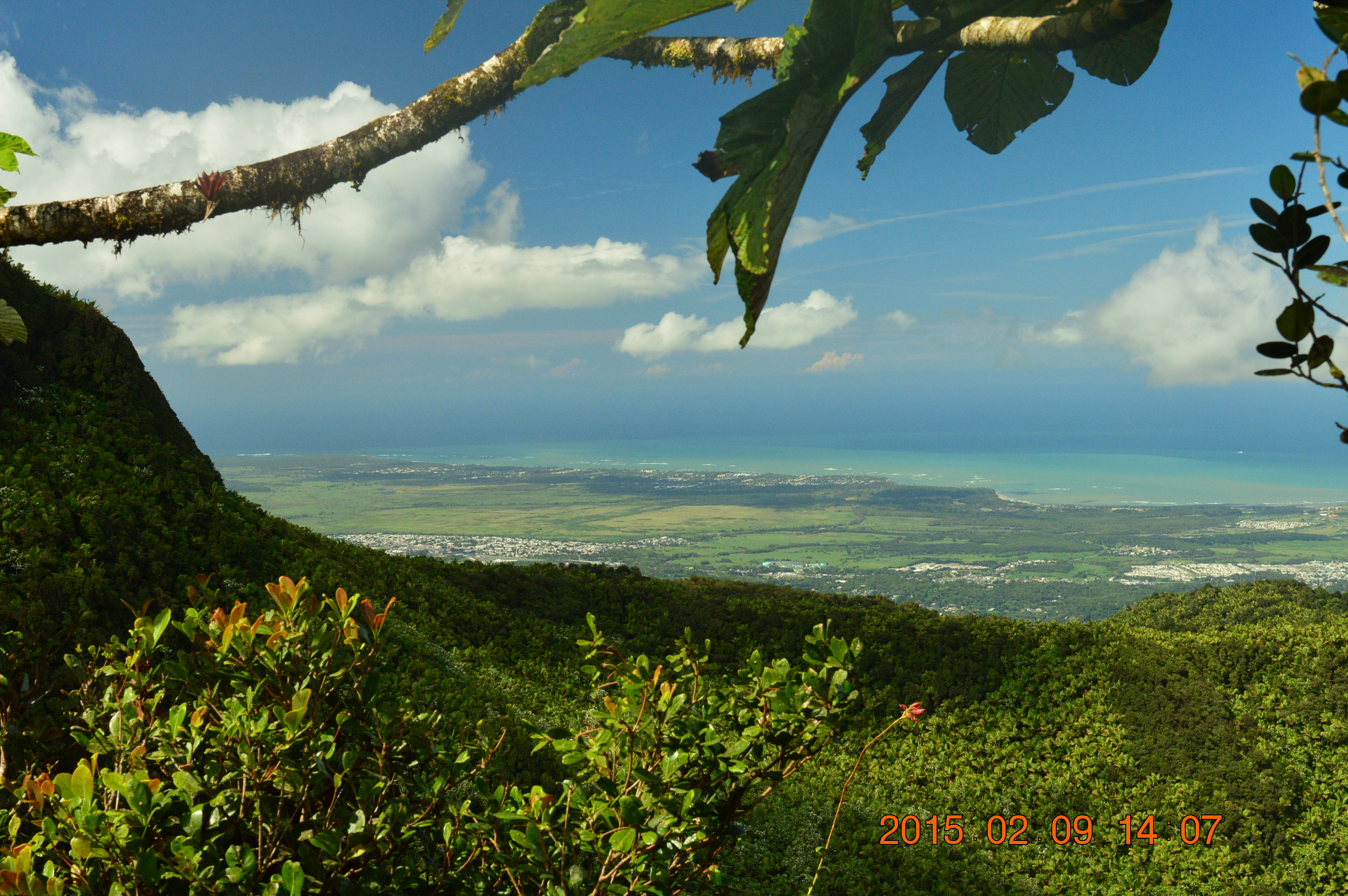
Los Tres Picachos, a smaller peak

The peak itself, standing at 1,062 meters (3,484 feet) above sea level is not the highest in Puerto Rico or even the Sierra de Luquillo range where it is located. It is however the most famous peak due to its curious shape, its natural environment and history, and for its cultural importance to the Taino people. The peak is nearly always covered in thin mist and due to its high humidity, a quick shower develops during some afternoons. The hike to the top from the Mina Falls is not challenging yet it takes almost 4 1/2 hours.

This peak is located on the El Yunque massif which also contains other smaller peaks such as Mount Britton, Juan Diego Peak and the Roca del Yunque which is a rocky peak close to the summit of El Yunque. El Yunque massif itself is part of the Sierra de Luquillo. The highest point in the Sierra de Luquillo is El Toro (Spanish for the bull) located in the municipal boundary between Río Grande and Las Piedras, which lends its name to the El Toro Wilderness.

== Climate ==
El Yunque is classified as having a tropical rainforest climate, Köppen climate type 'Af', along with surrounding areas, approximating a subtropical highland climate at the peak. The average temperature of the park is 21 °C (70 °F), and seasonal variation virtually nonexistent. The rugged area can receive over 5,080 millimeters (200 inches) of annual rainfall and is the rainiest of all US national forests.

== Access ==
It is accessible via Mt Britton trail near the end of PR 191, which starts in PR 3 in the small town of Palmer. The best access from San Juan is via PR 66 toll express in 1 hr. which exits to PR 3. At the end of PR 191 in El Yunque there is a loop that goes to the entrance of the Mt Britton trail - close to El Yunque peak. It is one of the few places close to this trail with about 15 parking spots.

This trail is mostly paved and leads to the Mt Britton tower, the Three Peaks (Tres Picachos), the spur trail, and finally El Yunque peak with communications systems (towers) and then a small tower in the peak. The main road PR 191 has a gate at the end and after this there is a maintenance road to El Yunque and then the closed section of PR 191 which is about 3 hours long - a road that is being reclaimed by the forest and is closed due to a massive landslide. There is also the entrance the Tradewinds trail - possibly the longest trail of the park, which ends in El Toro Peak.

Its summit provides views of the other peaks of El Yunque, the vast rainforest below, and the rest of the island. The river in PR 191 called Quebrada Juan Diego is just below this peak and has a trails, waterfalls and ponds.

== Gallery ==
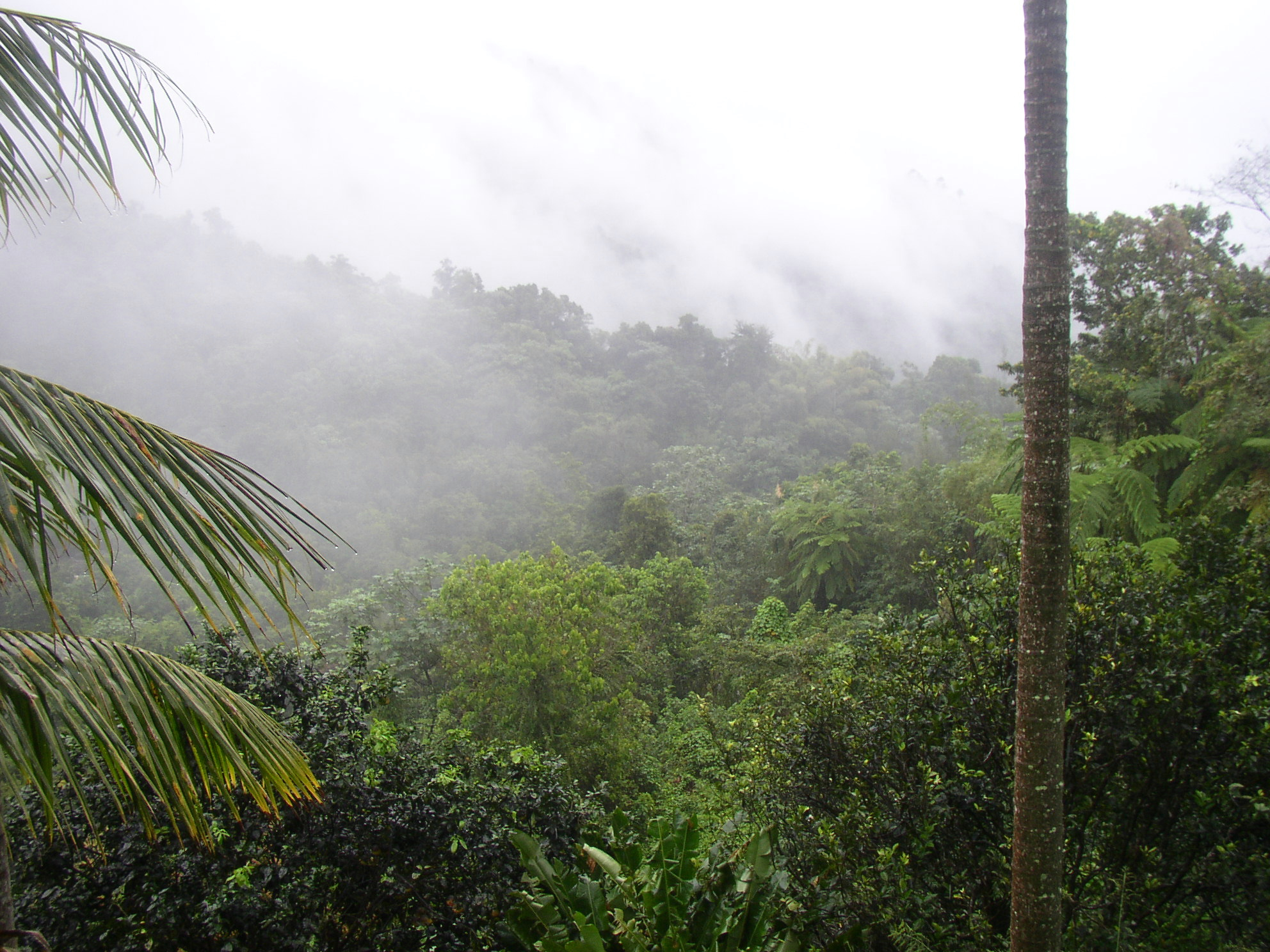
Morning mist in El Yunque rainforest by El Yunque peak.

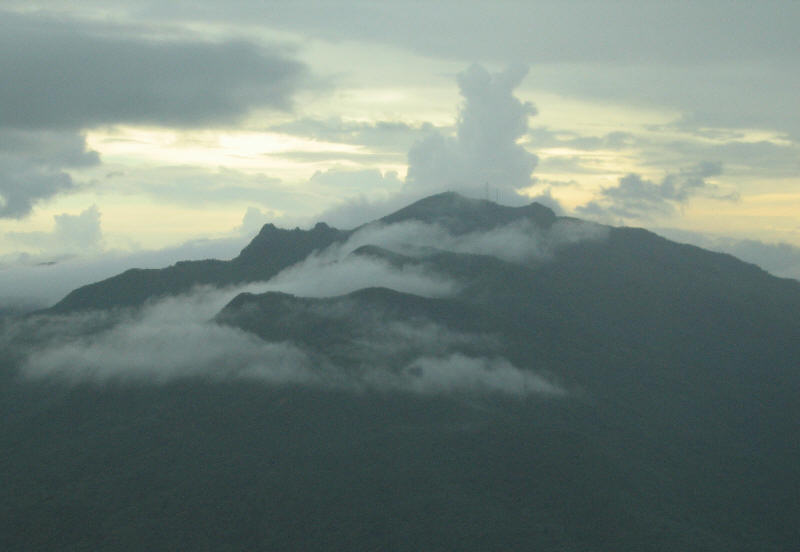
El Yunque massif with Pico El Yunque, Roca El Yunque and Mount Britton.

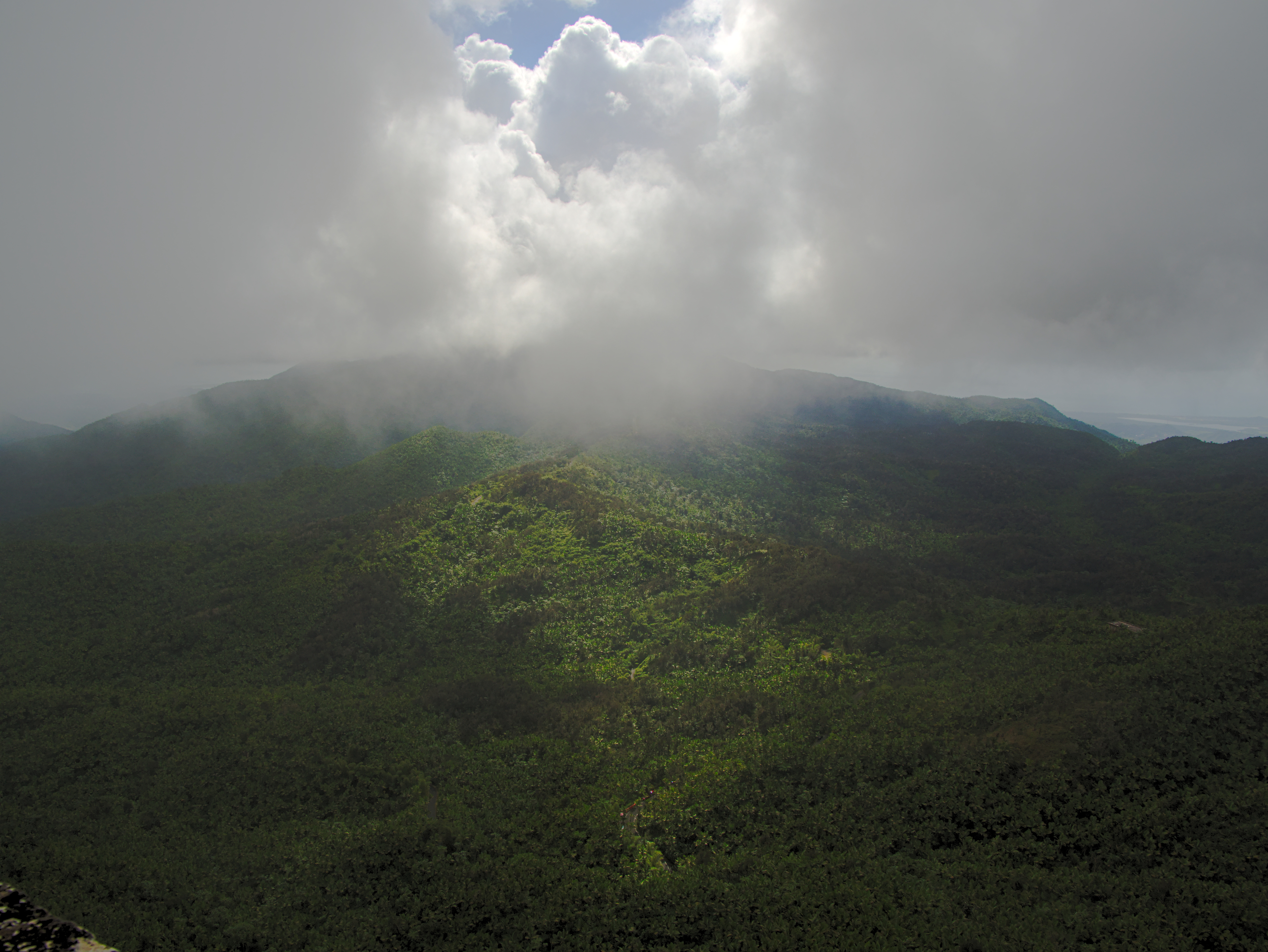
El Yunque view from Mount Britton Tower.

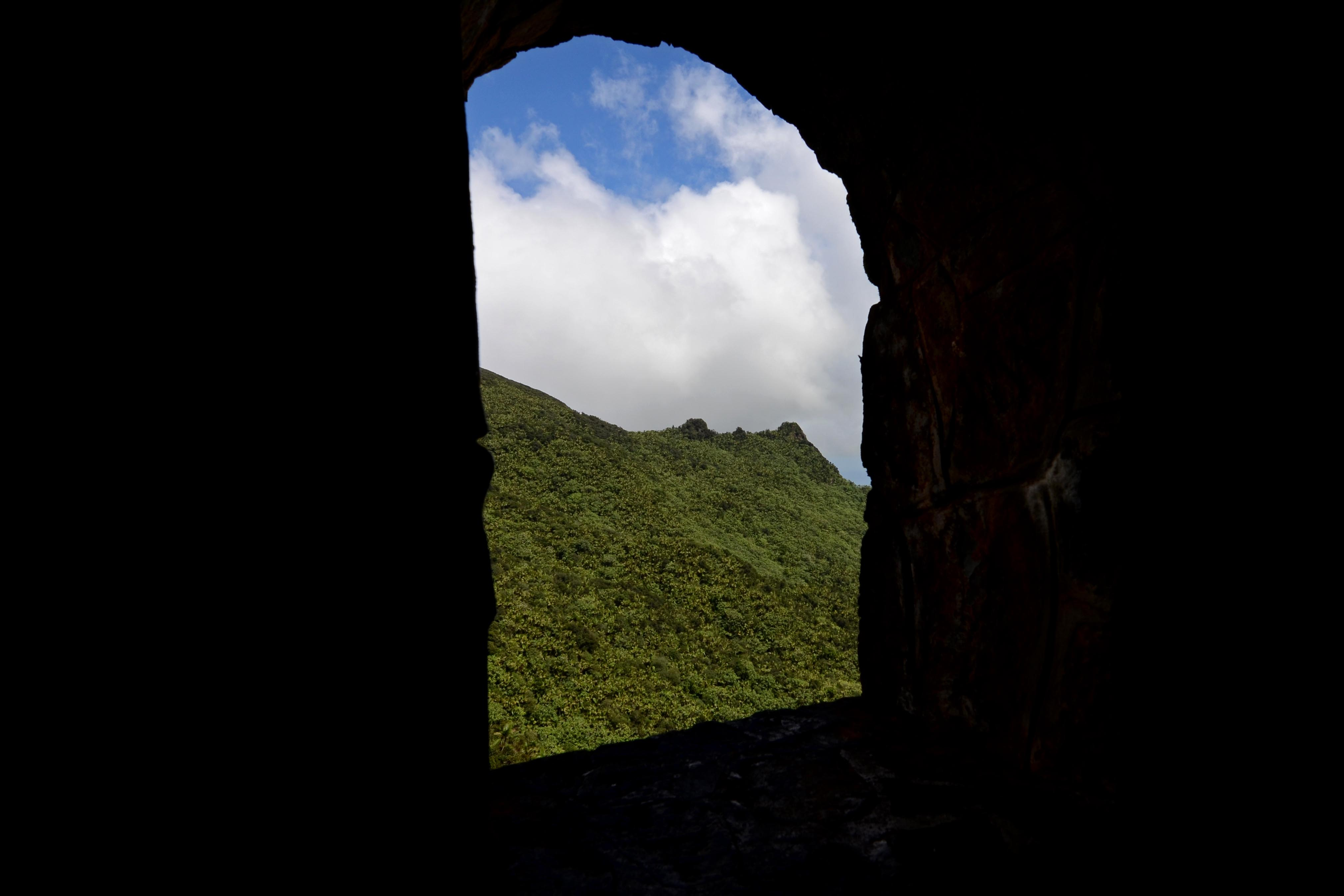
El Yunque from Yocahu Tower.

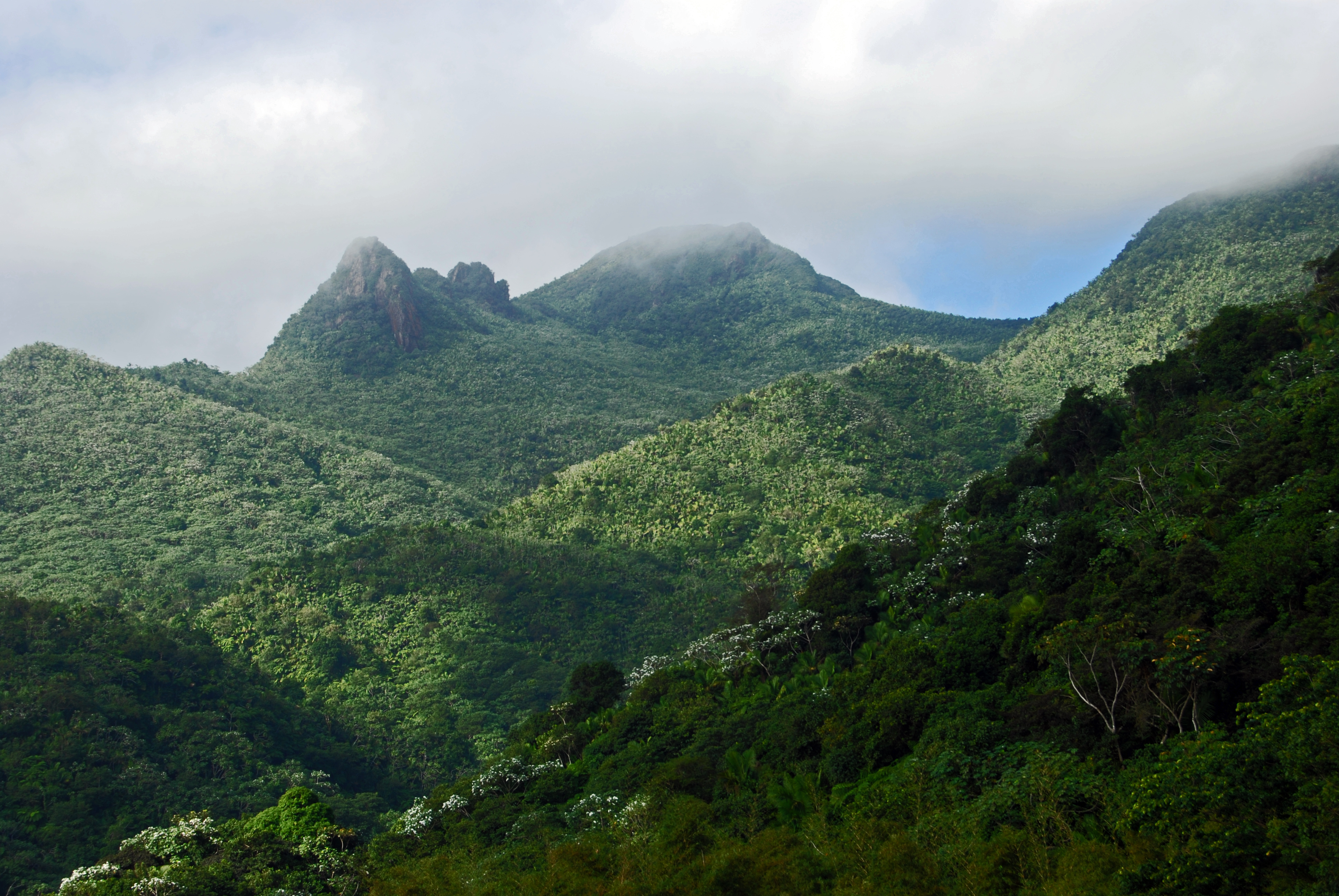
Los Picachos (left) and El Yunque (right) covered in fog.

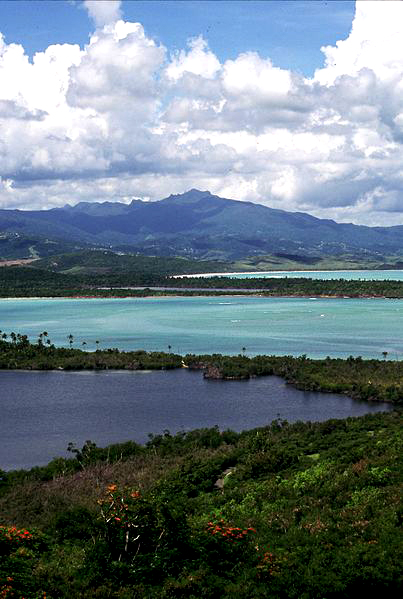
El Yunque from the Northeast Ecological Corridor.

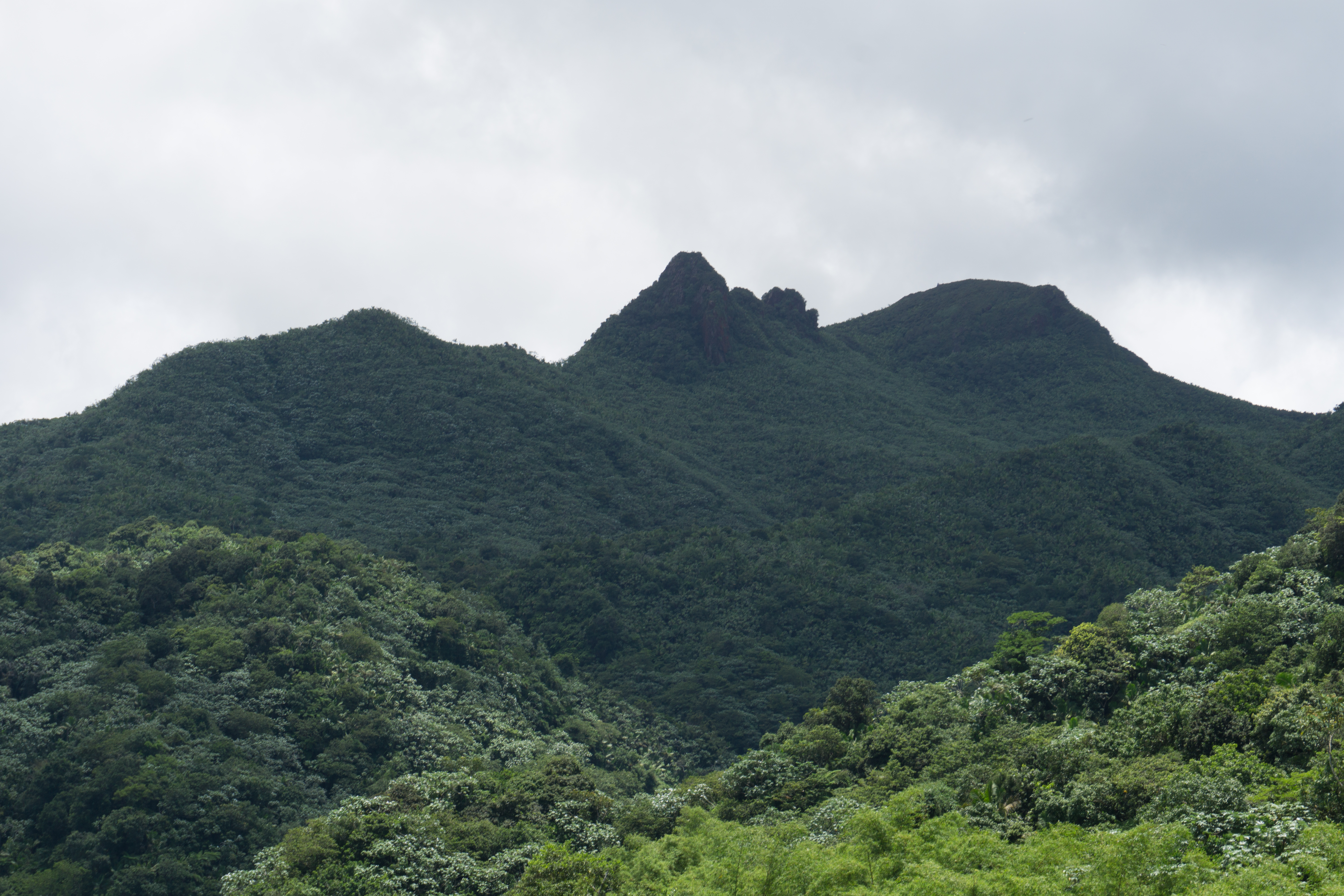

== See also ==
- El Yunque National Forest
