= El Toro Wilderness =

National Wilderness Preservation System in Puerto Rico

- IUCN category Ib (wilderness area)
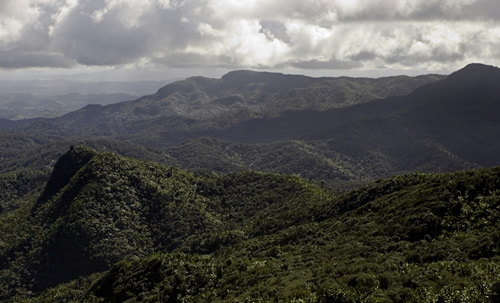
- El Toro Wilderness from Mt. Britton in El Yunque National Forest

- Location within Puerto Rico
- Location: El Yunque National Forest
- Nearest city: Canovanas, Puerto Rico
- Coordinates: 18°16′13″N 65°49′44″W
- Area: 10,254 acres (41.5 km^{2})
- Established: December 2005
- Governing body: United States Forest Service

El Toro Wilderness (Spanish: Selva El Toro) is a 10,254-acre (41.5 km^{2}) federally designated National Wilderness Preservation System unit located within El Yunque National Forest in the Sierra de Luquillo mountain subrange in the northeast of the main island of Puerto Rico. Named after El Toro, the highest peak in the forest at 3,524 feet (1,074 m), it is located within in the municipalities of Río Grande, Naguabo, Las Piedras, and Canóvanas. It is the only tropical wilderness in the United States National Forest System, created by the Caribbean National Forest Act of 2005.

El Toro Wilderness, along with the Luquillo Experimental Forest (LEF), is part of the Luquillo Biosphere Reserve, a designated UNESCO biosphere reserve, which emphasizes the importance of protection of biodiversity through conservation.

Despite being located in one of the most remote areas of El Yunque National Forest, the El Toro Wilderness can be accessed through the Trade Winds and El Toro Trails from atop the El Yunque forest or directly via the El Toro Trail on Puerto Rico Highway 186 in the Cubuy barrio of the Canóvanas municipality.

Entrance sign to El Toro Wilderness from the Trade Winds Trail atop El Yunque National Forest

== Features ==
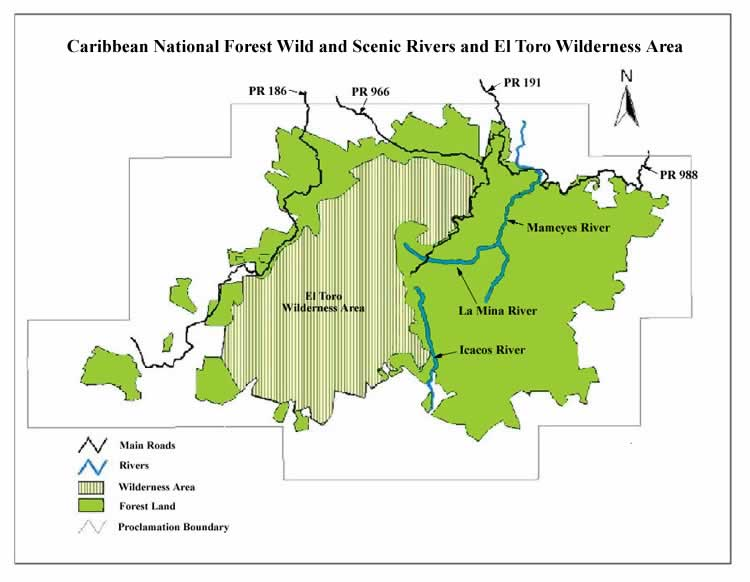
Caribbean National Forest map

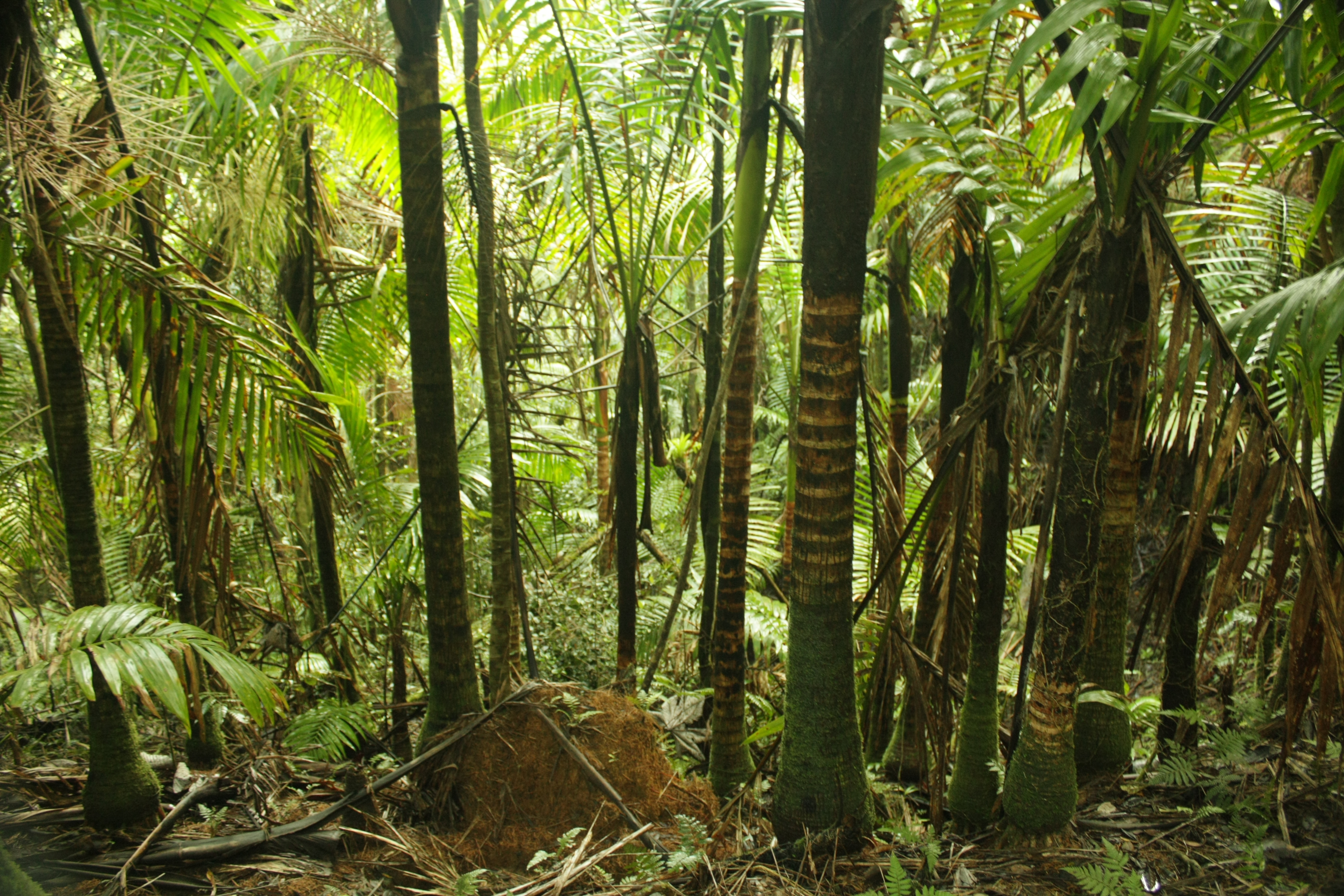

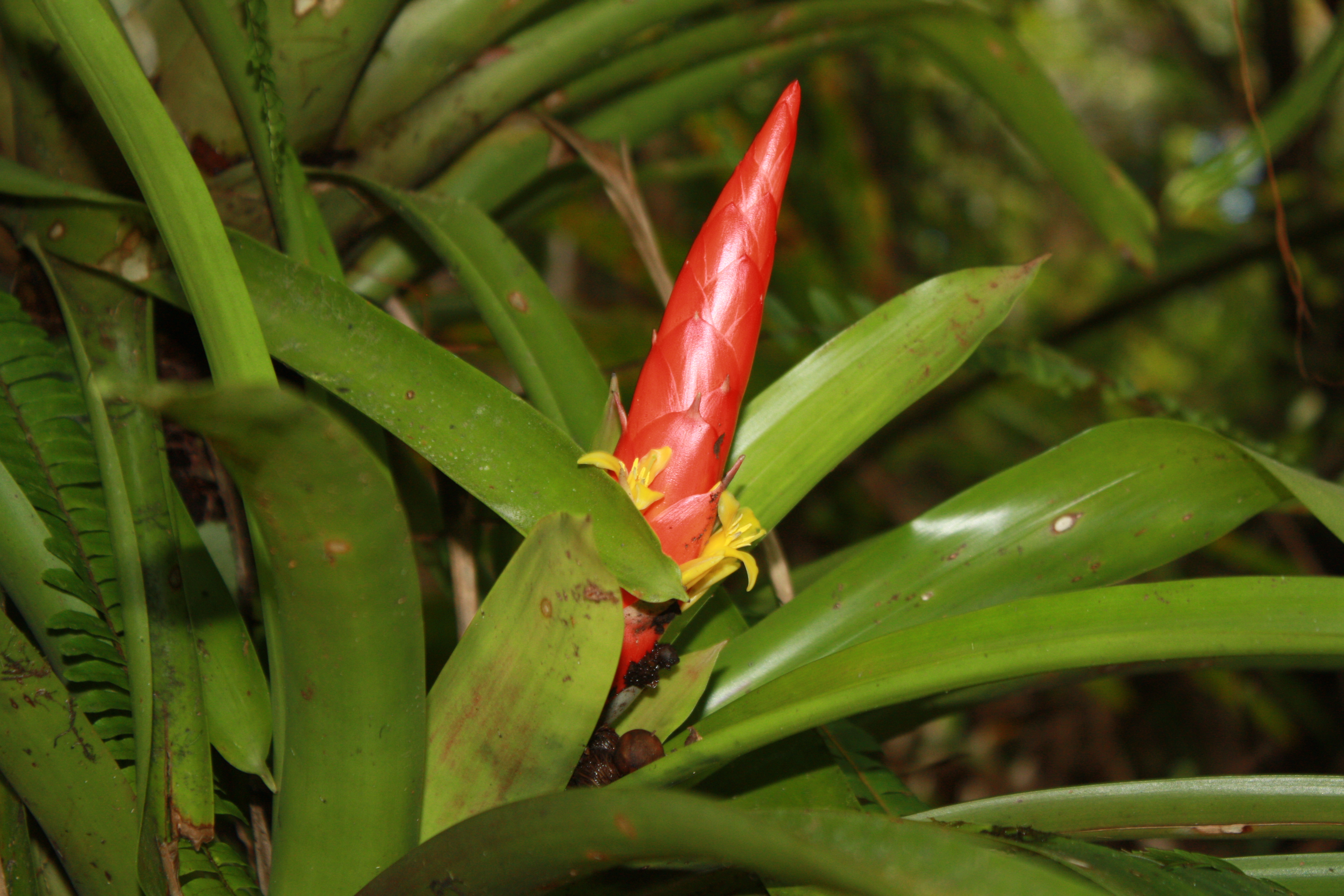

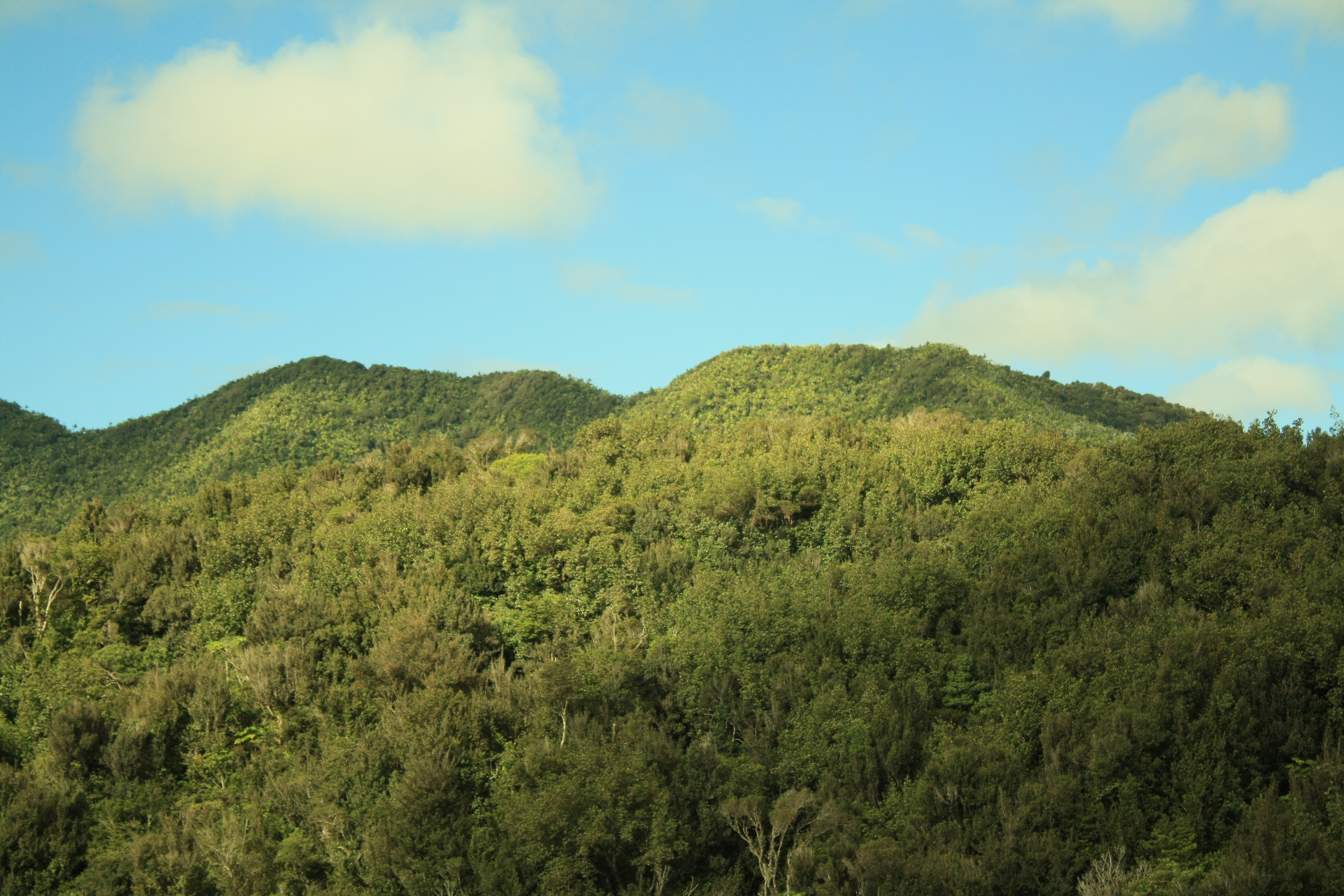

El Toro Wilderness has dense vegetation with mixed evergreen plants ranging from 3 meters to 30 meters in height at the highest and lowest mountain elevations, respectively. The forest protects all four major forest types found throughout the national forest: the tabonuco forest, the palo colorado forest, the Sierra palm tree forest and the dwarf forest (also known as the elfin forest or cloud forest).

The wilderness is home to a number of plant and animal species found nowhere else in the world, such as the endangered Puerto Rican parrot and the rare elfin woods warbler. The forest is home to 42 native and 35 migratory bird species, a number of bat species, and high numbers of amphibian and reptile species, such as the Puerto Rican boa. Some of the rare plant species found in the area include the endangered miniature orchid Lepanthes eltoroensis and the critically endangered palo de jazmín (Styrax portoricensis).

The area also contains important archaeological sites and Taino petroglyphs, such as the Icacos Petroglyph Group (also known as the Rio Blanco Petroglyphs), listed on the National Register of Historic Places since 2015.

== Recreation ==
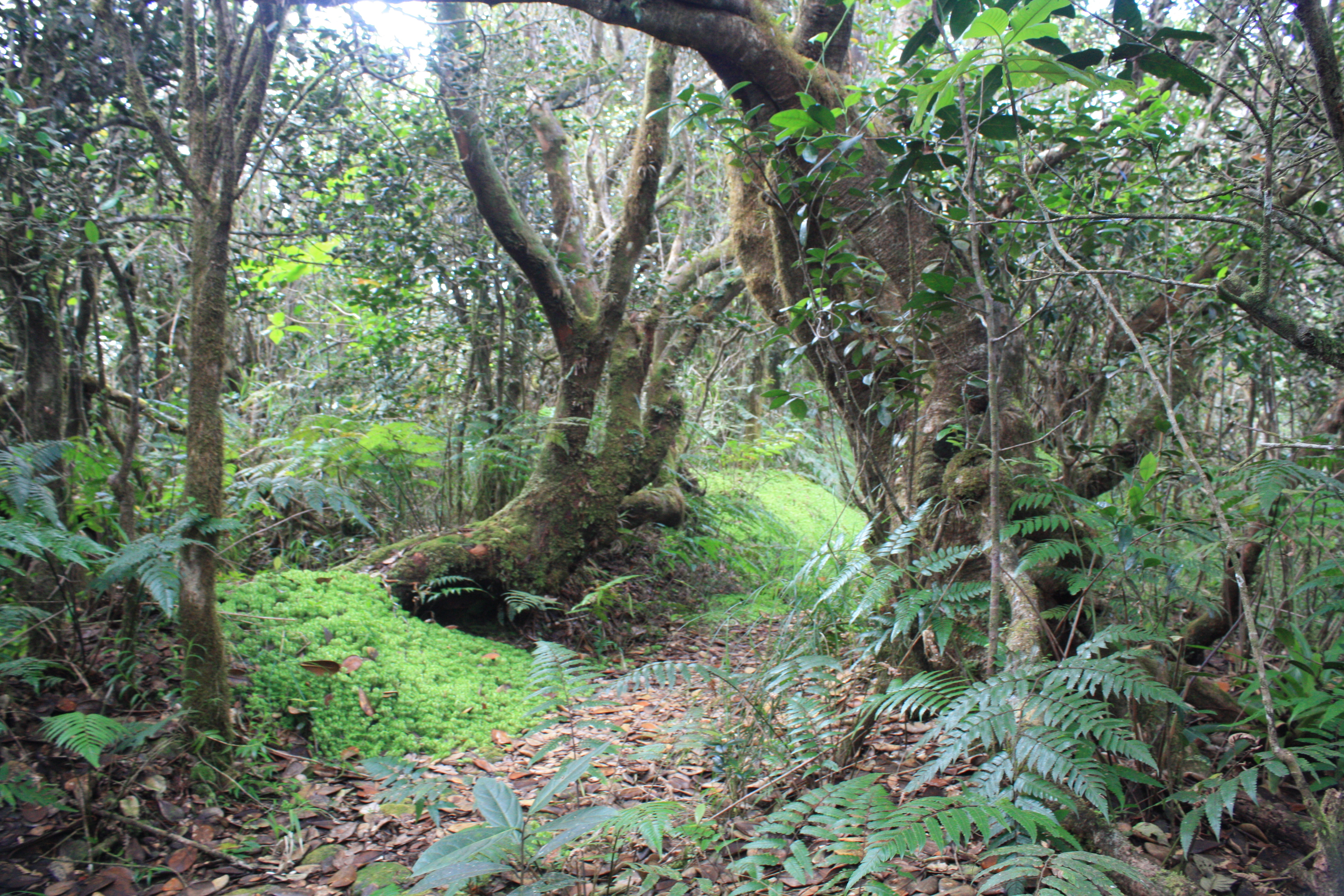
In the Tradewinds Trail - the cloud forest, before Hurricane Maria

Recreational opportunities in the wilderness include hiking, birdwatching and primitive or dispersed camping. Two hiking trails cross the wilderness area: El Toro Trail, which starts from Cubuy in Canóvanas and leads to the summit of El Toro, and the Sabana Trail which begins at the Sabana Recreation Area in Naguabo and loops through the dense jungle. Additionally, the Tradewinds Trail traverses El Toro Wilderness and connects these two trails with the rest of the national forest.

The entrance to the El Toro Trail is at PR-186, km 10.8, which is near an entrance to the park in that same road. This is a steep about 3-hour hike. First you will go by next to some private property, then see the trail signs, then a steep gravel trail for 1 hour, then a very muddy trail, then a series of boulders like a staircase for 1 hour and then a flat path to the top. From El Toro peak it connects to the Tradewinds Trail which starts in El Yunque PR-191, the main access road to El Yunque.

From El Toro peak it connects to the Tradewinds Trail which starts in El Yunque PR-191, the main access road to El Yunque. Advise to return from here since the other trail is over 4 hours long and you will end way off your parked car, unless you have someone pick up up in the end gate of PR-191.

El Toro peak is the tallest and has a panoramic view of the east coast of Puerto Rico, Naguabo and Humacao, and the ocean. This peak has less rain and fog compared to El Yunque and is undeveloped. Unlike the El Yunque Trail, very few visitors come here.

The trails are remote, and there is little if any cell phone reception.

== See also ==
- List of U.S. Wilderness Areas
- Wilderness Act
