= Los Picachos =

Mountain peak of El Yunque in Puerto Rico

Coordinates: 18°18′34″N 65°47′15″W

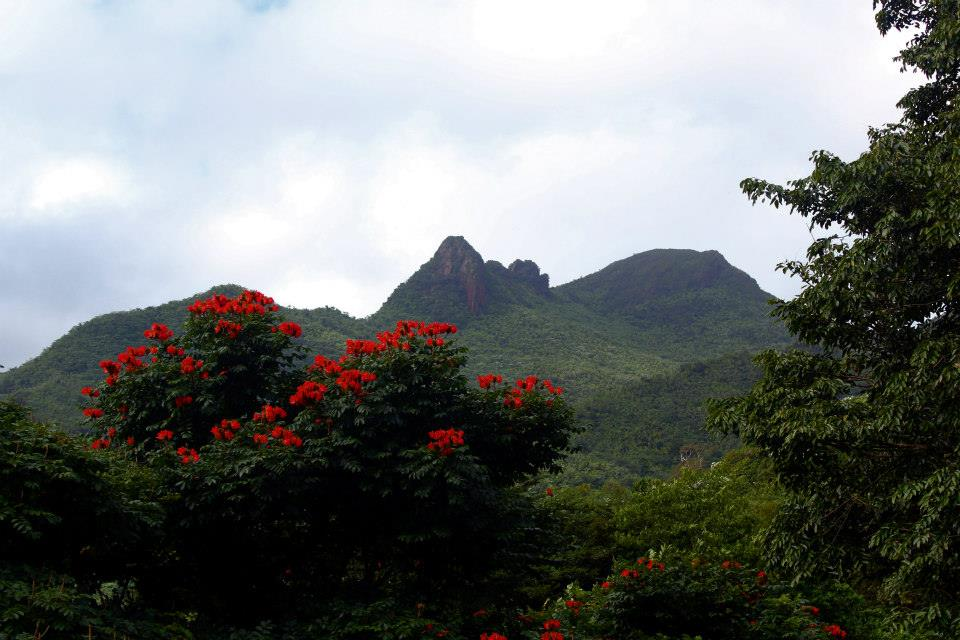
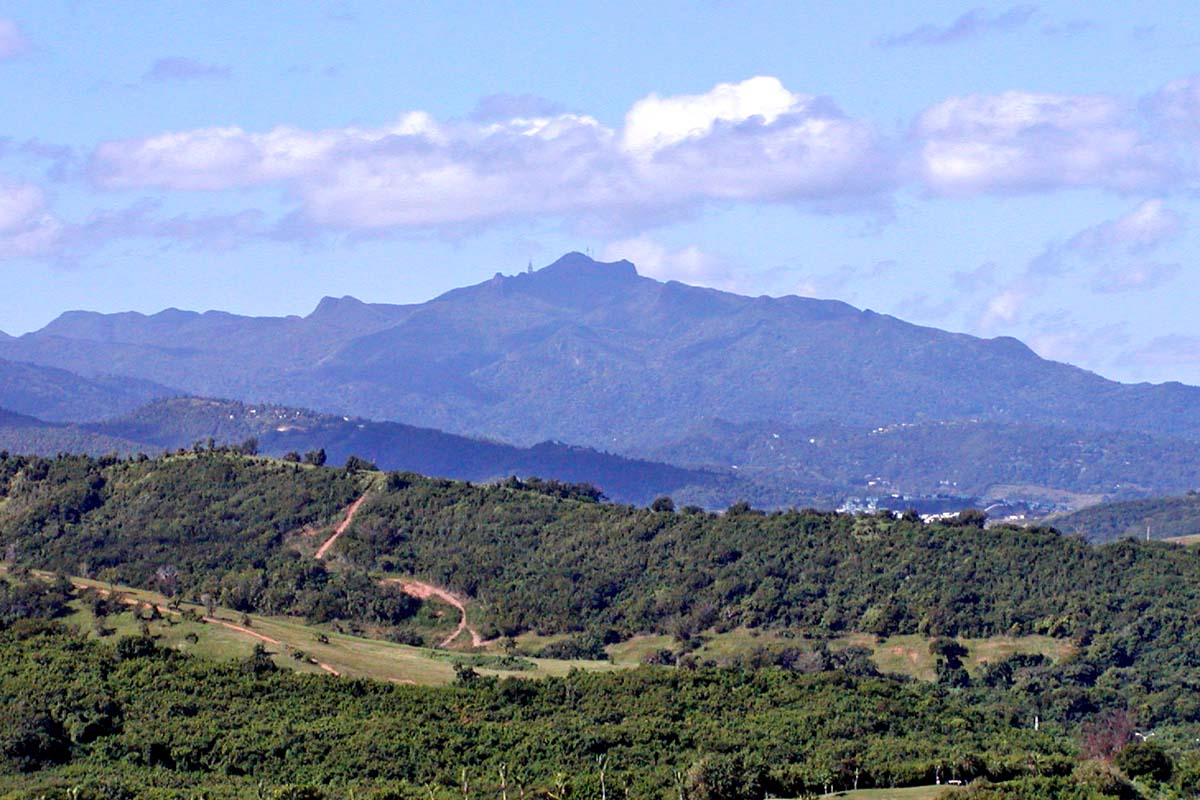
- Los Picachos (center) peak next to El Yunque (right) peak Eastern view of Los Picachos (right in center) peak from Fajardo

Highest point
- Elevation: 968 m (3,176 ft)
- Parent peak: El Yunque

Naming
- Etymology: Spanish for "the little peaks"

Geography
- Location: Río Grande, Puerto Rico
- Parent range: Sierra de Luquillo

Climbing
- Easiest route: Hike (Los Picachos Trail)

Los Picachos is a mountain peak of El Yunque massif located immediately to the southeast of El Yunque's main peak in the Sierra de Luquillo. The peak consists of a high ridge made up of several smaller peaks (which gives the mountain its name) and it is one of the highest peaks of El Yunque National Forest that can be reached by a hiking trail. It is located at 3,176 feet (968 m) above the sea level.

== Los Picachos hiking trail ==
Los Picachos can be easily reached through a hiking trail located near to the main Pico El Yunque Trail, one of the most popular hiking routes in the national forest. The very short but steep trail starts off Pico El Yunque Trail and it extends for little more than 0.2 miles to the top, where a stone masonry platform offers a 360 panoramic view of the surrounding mountains and the eastern coast of Puerto Rico. The vegetation along this trail belongs to that of the rare dwarf forest ecosystem which features "dwarf trees" such as the miniature Clusia clusioides, and equally small species of animals such as the dwarf anole (Anolis occultus) and the endangered elfin woods warbler (Setophaga angelae). Although very short, the trail difficulty is classified as moderate to difficult.

== Gallery ==
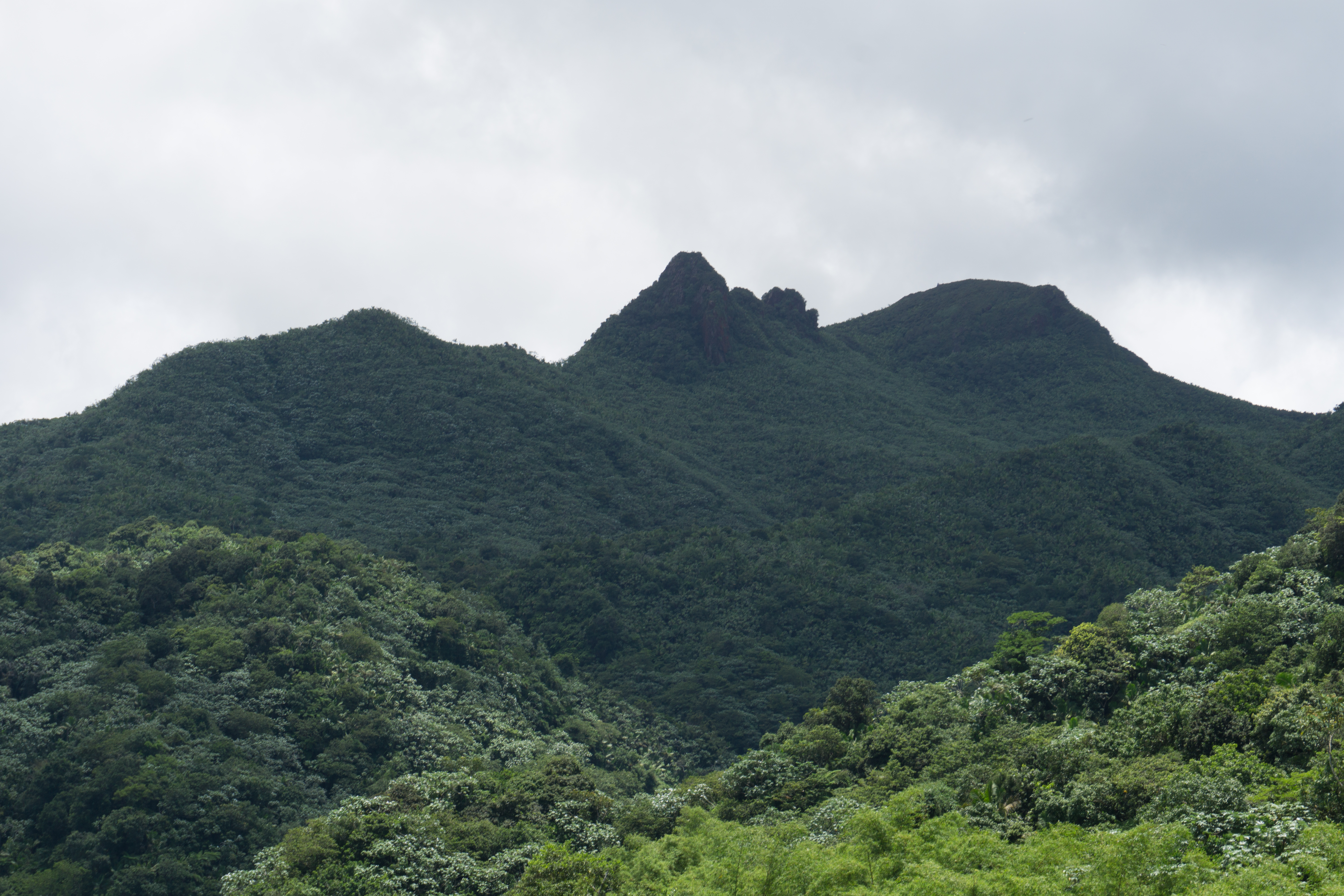
Los Picachos and El Yunque from Yokahu Tower

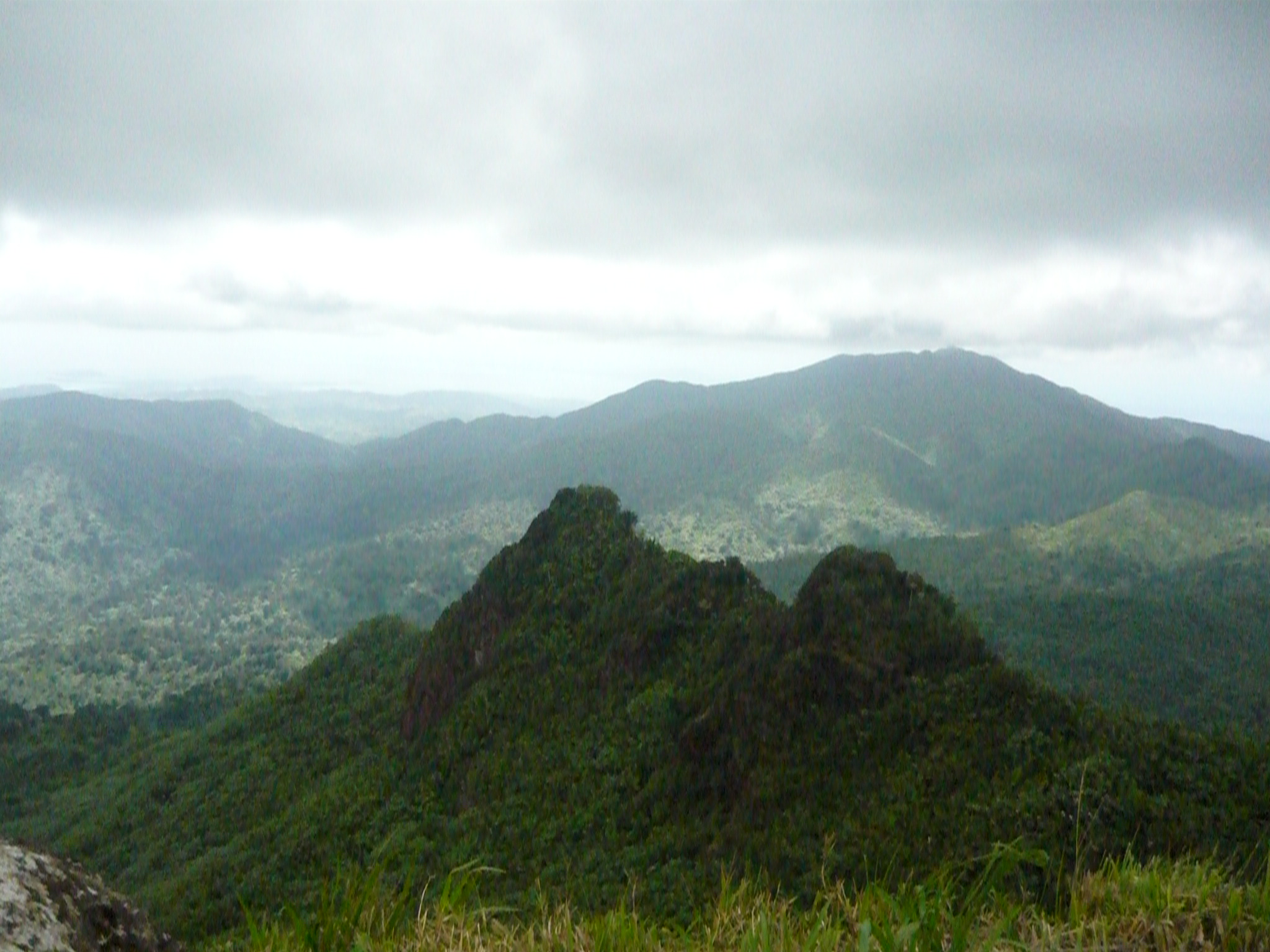
Los Picachos as seen from Mount Britton

== See also ==
- Dwarf forest
