= El Toro (Sierra de Luquillo) =

Mountain in Puerto Rico

Coordinates: 18°16′20″N 65°49′45″W

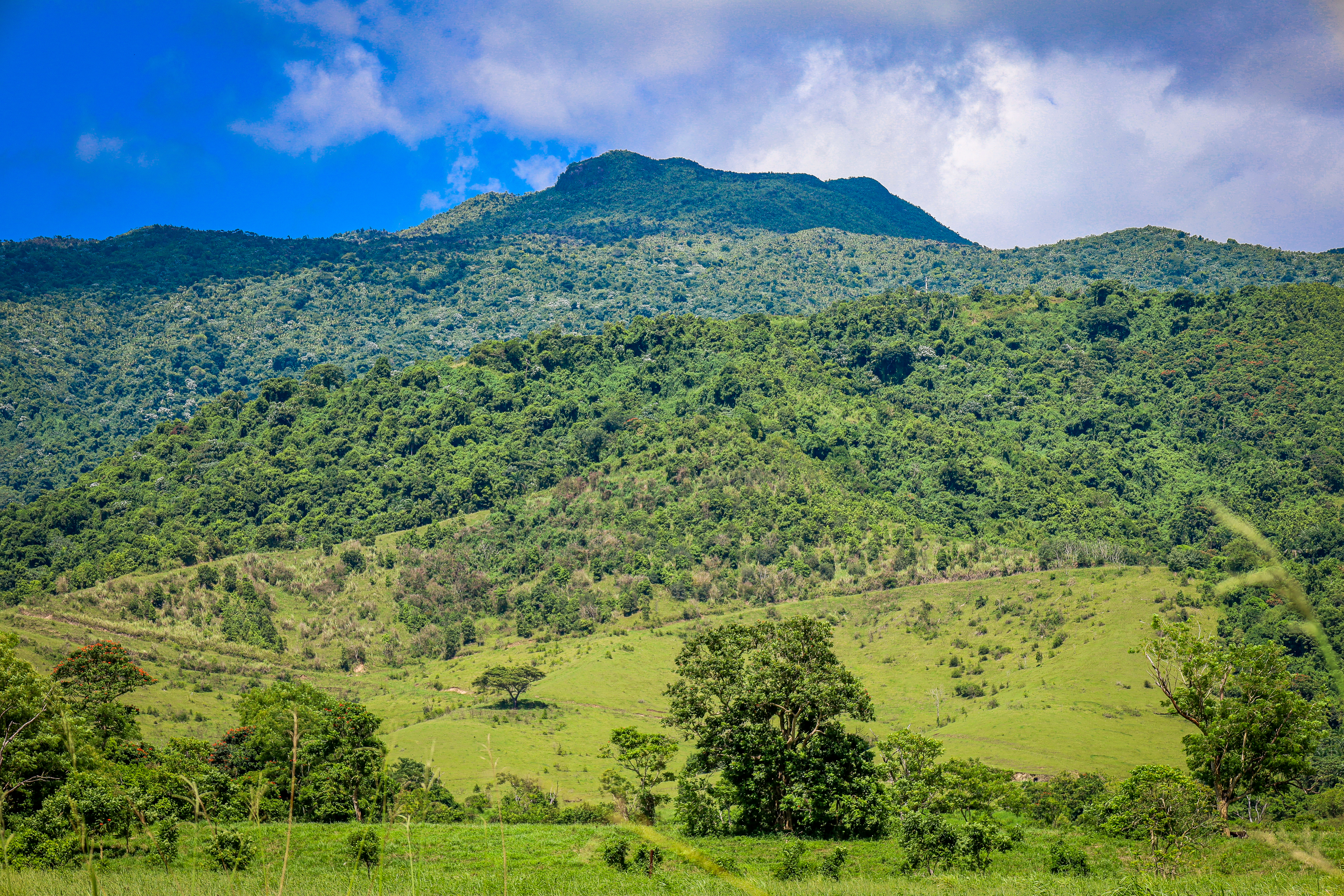
- Western view of Sierra de Luquillo from San Juan Cruise Port in Old San Juan historic quarter in San Juan Islet Southern view of El Toro peak from El Río, Las Piedras

Highest point
- Elevation: 3,524 ft (1,074 m)
- Prominence: 988 ft (301 m)
- Parent peak: Cerro de Punta

Naming
- Etymology: "the bull" in Spanish

Geography
- Location: Las Piedras, Puerto Rico and Río Grande, Puerto Rico
- Parent range: Sierra de Luquillo

Climbing
- Easiest route: hike

El Toro (Spanish for the bull) is 3,524 feet (1,074 m) high, making it the highest peak in the Sierra de Luquillo mountain subrange of the Cordillera Central range in the northeast of the main island of Puerto Rico. Within the El Yunque National Forest, it is located on the town boundary between the municipalities of Río Grande and Las Piedras, specifically within the barrios of Guzmán Arriba and El Río. It is the source of various rivers in the region, including the Cubuy and Gurabo.

El Toro gives its name to El Toro Wilderness, which was first established in the 1930s. It was officially designated as a Wilderness Area in 2005, making it the only tropical wilderness in the U.S. National Forest System (NFS). Despite being located in one of the most remote areas of El Yunque National Forest, the peak can be accessed through the Trade Winds and El Toro trails from atop the El Yunque forest or directly via the El Toro trail on Puerto Rico Highway 186 in the Cubuy barrio of the Canóvanas municipality.

== Gallery ==
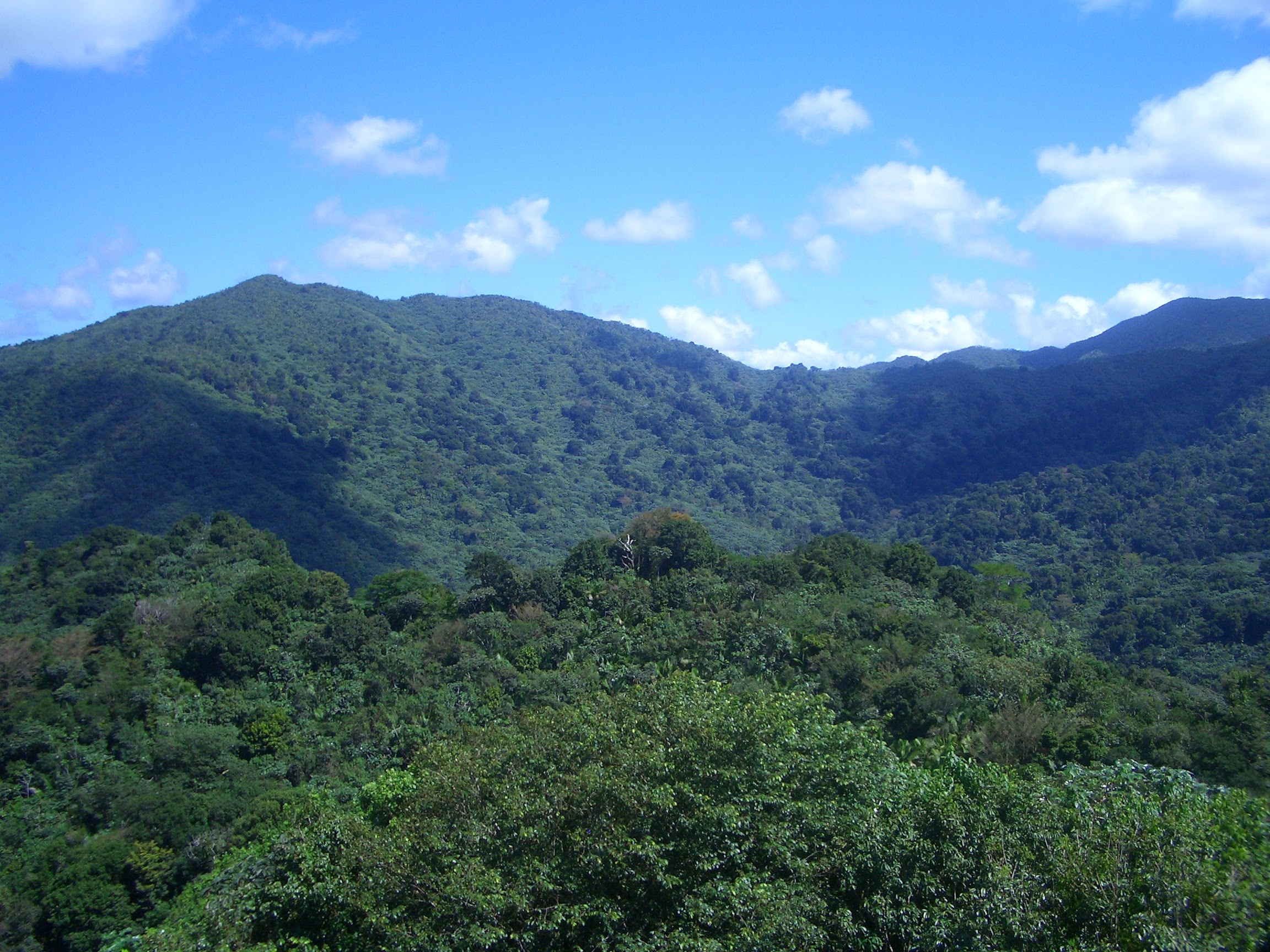
View from Yokahu Tower in El Yunque

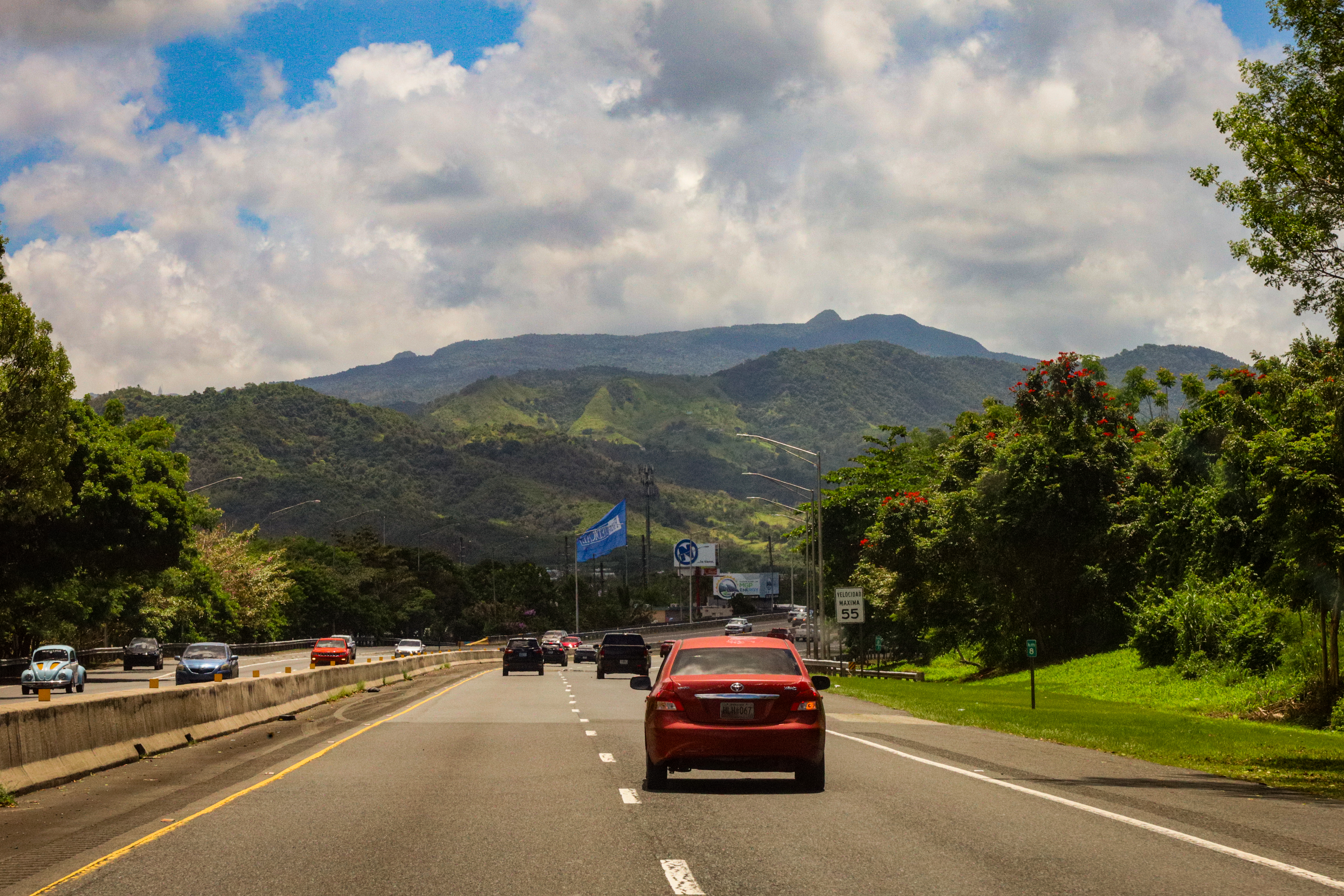
View from PR-30 in Juncos

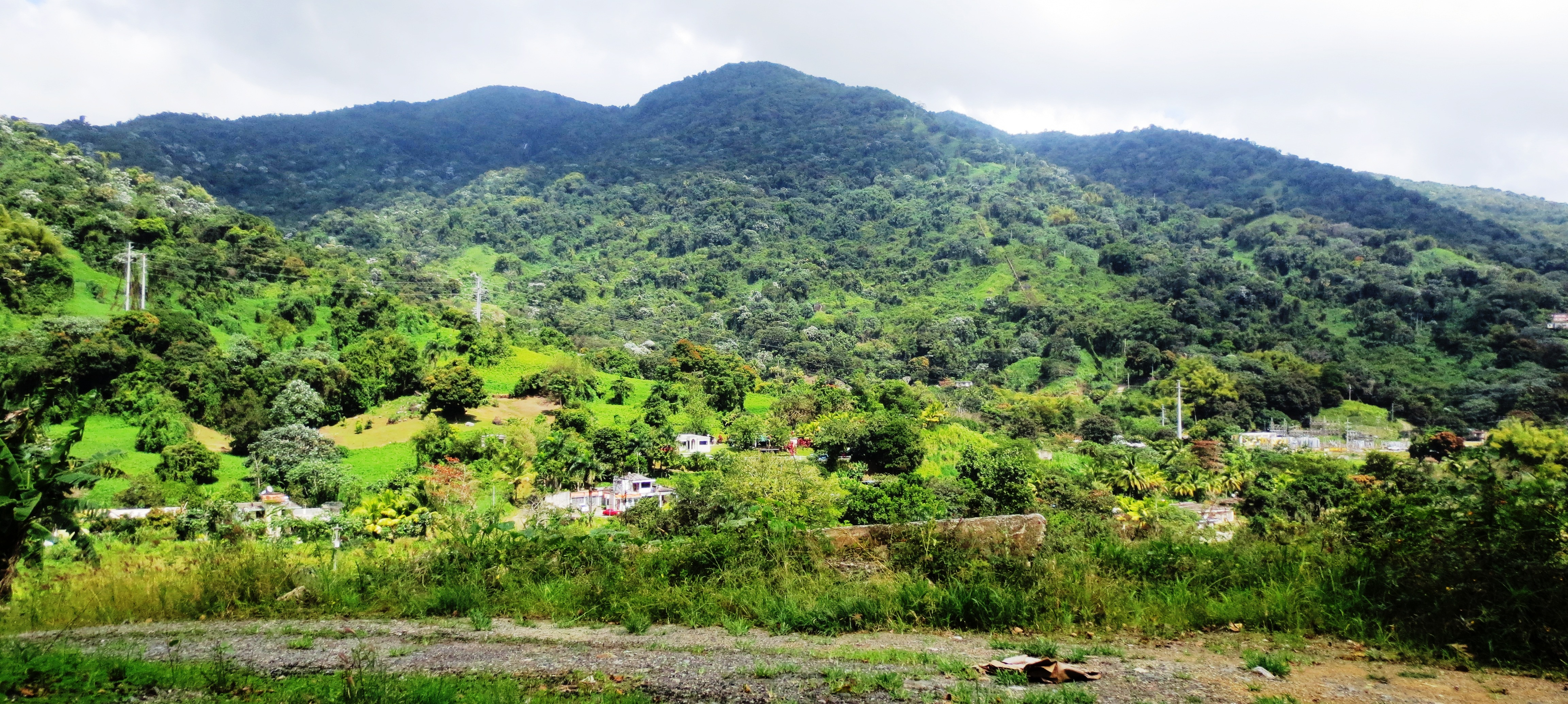
View from Peña Pobre in Naguabo

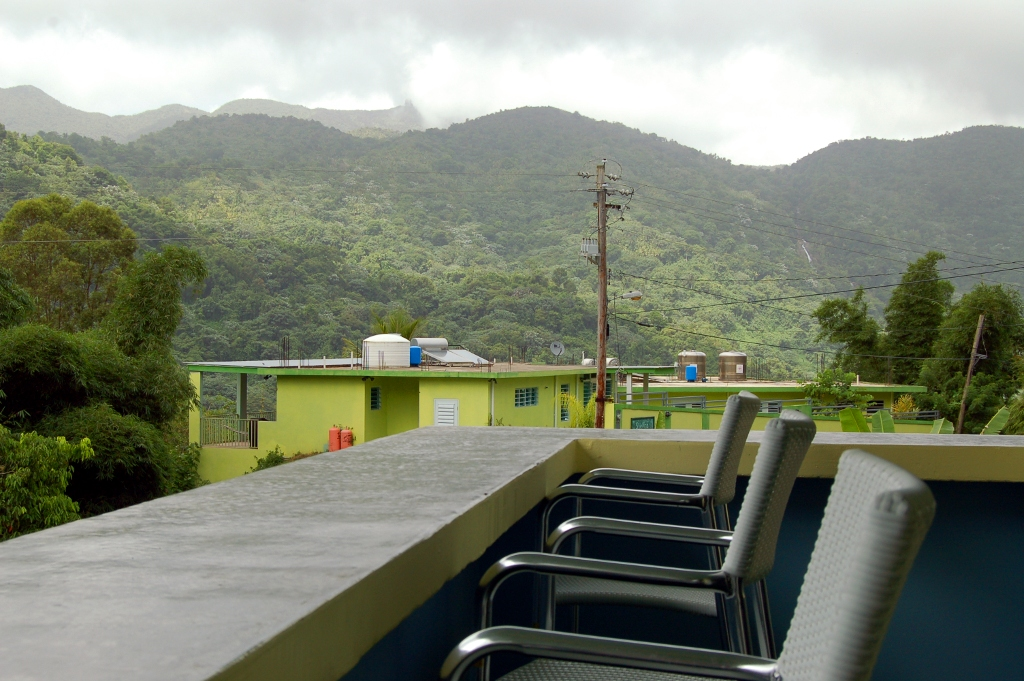
View from Río Blanco in Naguabo

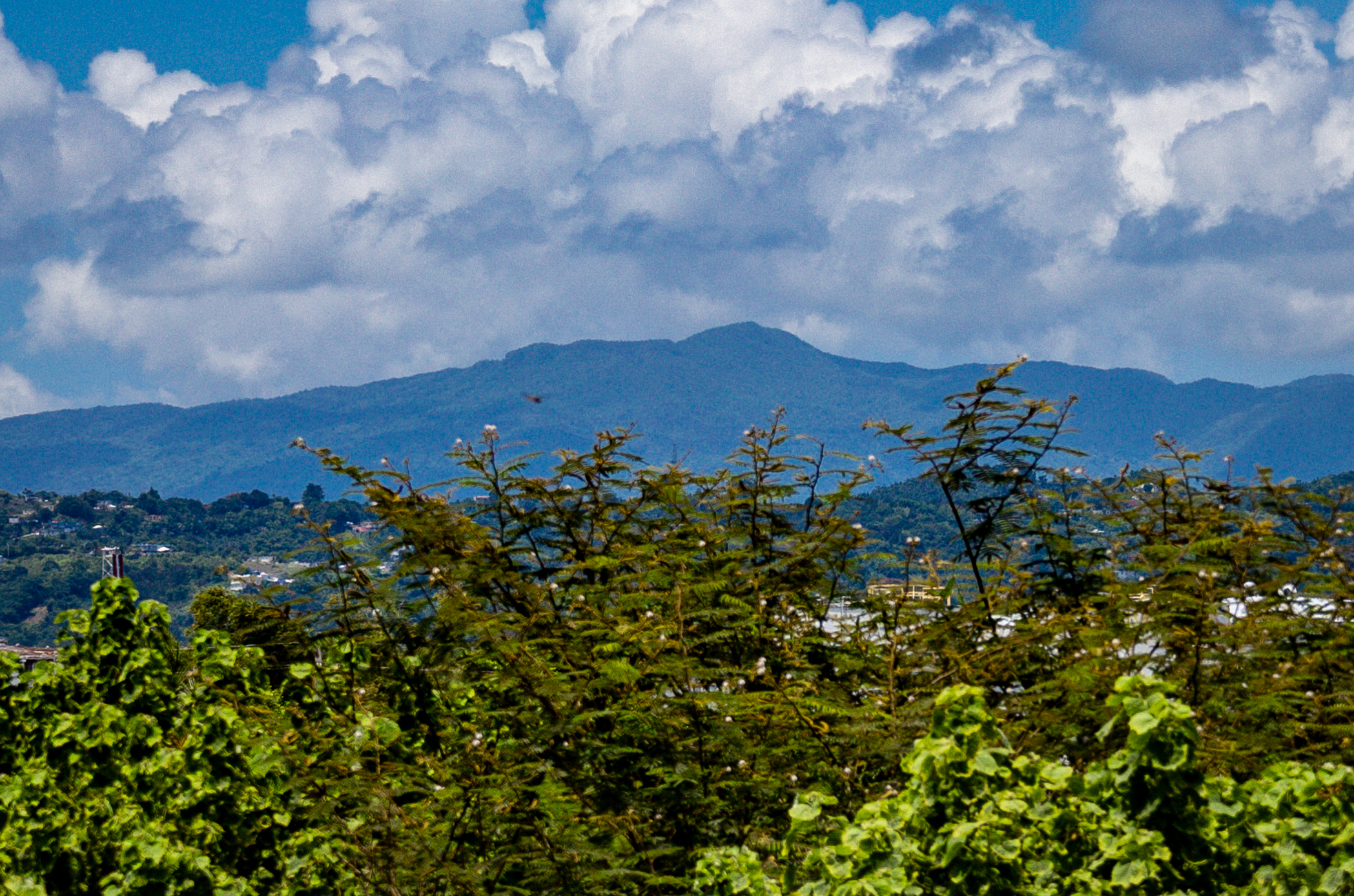
View from Camino Nuevo in Yabucoa.

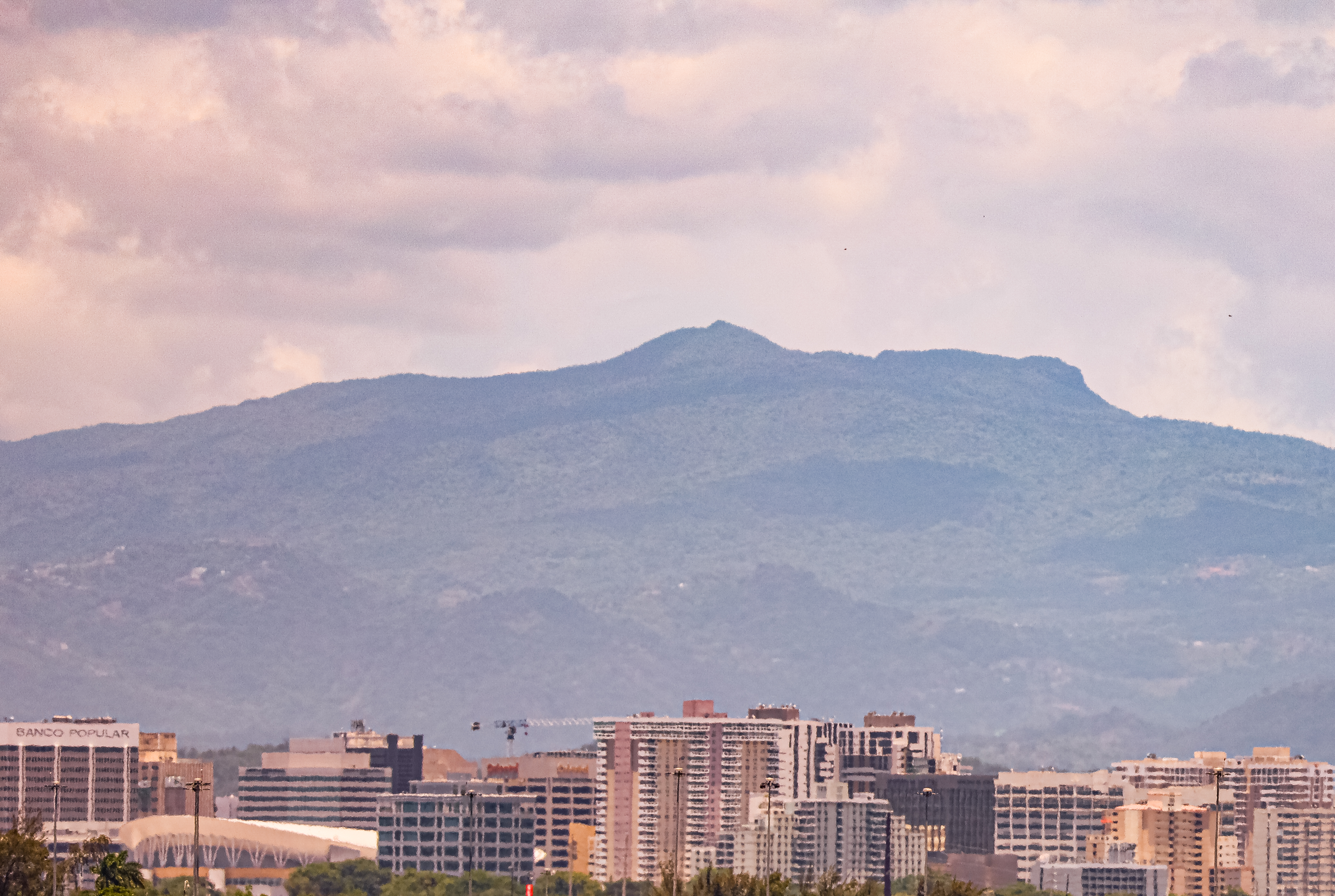
View in the background of Hato Rey from Old San Juan.
