= Sierra de Luquillo =

Mountain subrange in Puerto Rico

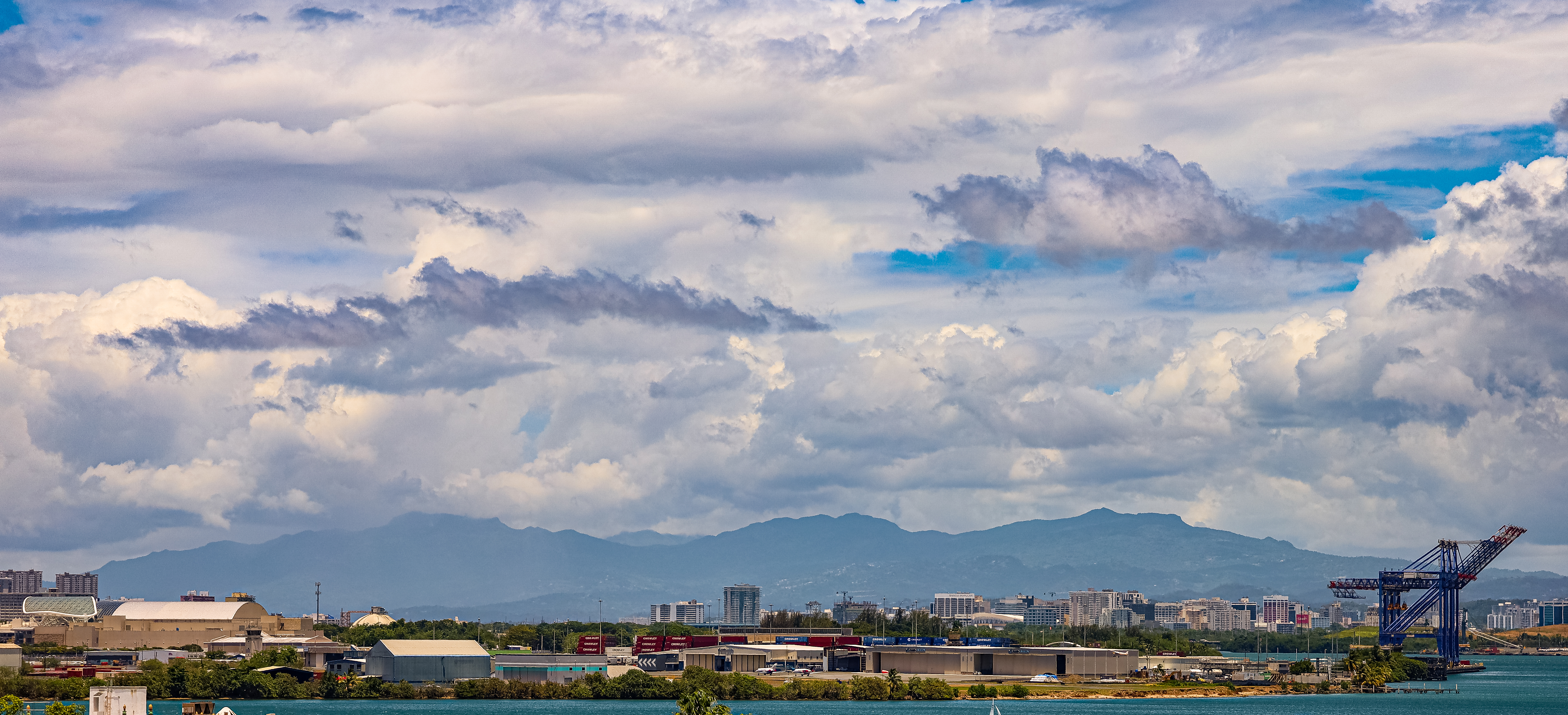
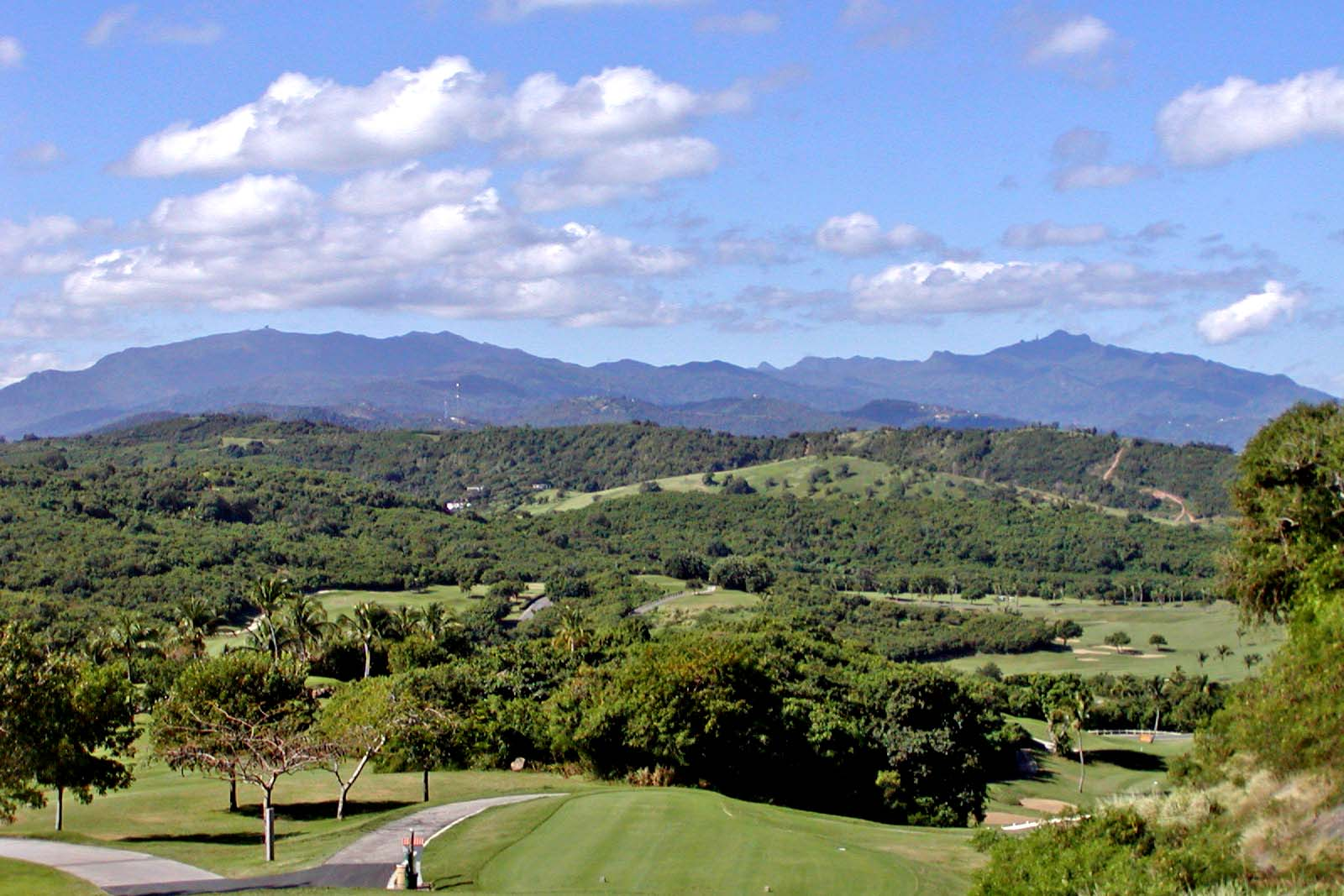
- Western view of Sierra de Luquillo from San Juan Cruise Port in Old San Juan historic quarter in San Juan Islet Eastern view of Sierra de Luquillo from Fajardo

Highest point
- Peak: El Toro
- Elevation: 3,526 ft (1,075 m)
- Coordinates: 18°16′20″N 65°49′45″W

Geography
- Location: Puerto Rico
- Range coordinates: 18°18′03″N 65°47′36″W
- Parent range: Cordillera Central

The Sierra de Luquillo (English: "Luquillo Mountains") is a steep-sided, high-precipitation, and deeply-forested subrange of the Cordillera Central mountain range in the main island of Puerto Rico. Separated from the southeastern Sierra de Cayey subrange by the Caguas Valley, it is primarily concentrated from west to east in the municipalities of Río Grande, Luquillo, and Naguabo in the northeastern region of the island. The summit of the mountain subrange is El Toro at 3,524 ft (1,074 m), and its most recognizable peak is El Yunque at 3,494 ft (1,065 m). As the location of El Yunque National Forest, the Sierra de Luquillo is a popular destination among domestic and foreign tourists.

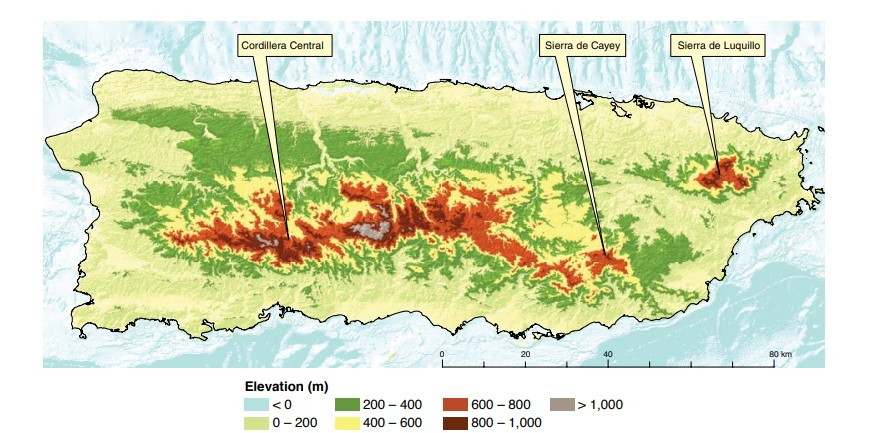
Topographical map of Puerto Rico with the Sierra de Luquillo in the northeast

Along with the eponymous main subrange of Cordillera Central and the Sierra de Cayey, the Luquillo subrange is one of three subranges of the Cordillera Central. However, although a subrange of the Cordillera Central, the Sierra de Luquillo is occasionally considered to be different from the rest of the central mountain range, as it is separated from it by the Caguas Valley and the Rio Grande de Loíza basin.

== Geography ==
Satellite images of Sierra de Luquillo

The mountains of the Sierra de Luquillo were formed by tectonic activity some 37 to 28 million years ago, the island being on the junction between the North American Plate and the Caribbean Plate. The main rock types are pyroclastic rocks, quartzdiorite and contact metamorphic hornfels, with some outcrops of alluvium, basalt and mafic rocks. Nine rivers have their sources in the mountains, flowing downward through steep, rocky and boulder-strewed channels before reach the coastal plains. Easterly winds off the Atlantic Ocean rise and cool as they pass over the mountains, and the ensuing heavy precipitation brings an annual rainfall of 5,000 mm (200 in) on the ridge. The lower slopes are less wet, but the summits are immersed in clouds most of the year.

The Sierra de Luquillo consists of a series of summits linked by a horseshoe-shaped ridge. Running from west to east, some of the peaks include El Toro, El Cacique and El Yunque, joined by a ridge known as Cuchilla el Duque to Pico del Oeste and Pico del Este.

== Mountains ==
The highest summits of the Sierra de Luquillo are the following:

1. El Toro - 3,524 ft. (1,074 m)
2. El Yunque - 3,494 ft. (1,065 m)
3. Pico del Este - 3,448 ft. (1,051 m)
4. Pico del Oeste - 3,363 ft. (1,025 m)
5. El Cacique - 3,350 ft. (1,020 m)
6. Los Picachos - 3,176 ft. (968 m)
7. Mt. Britton - 3,087 ft. (941 m)
8. Cerro La Mina - 3,054 ft. (931 m)
9. El Negro - 2,460 ft. (750 m)

== Flora and fauna ==
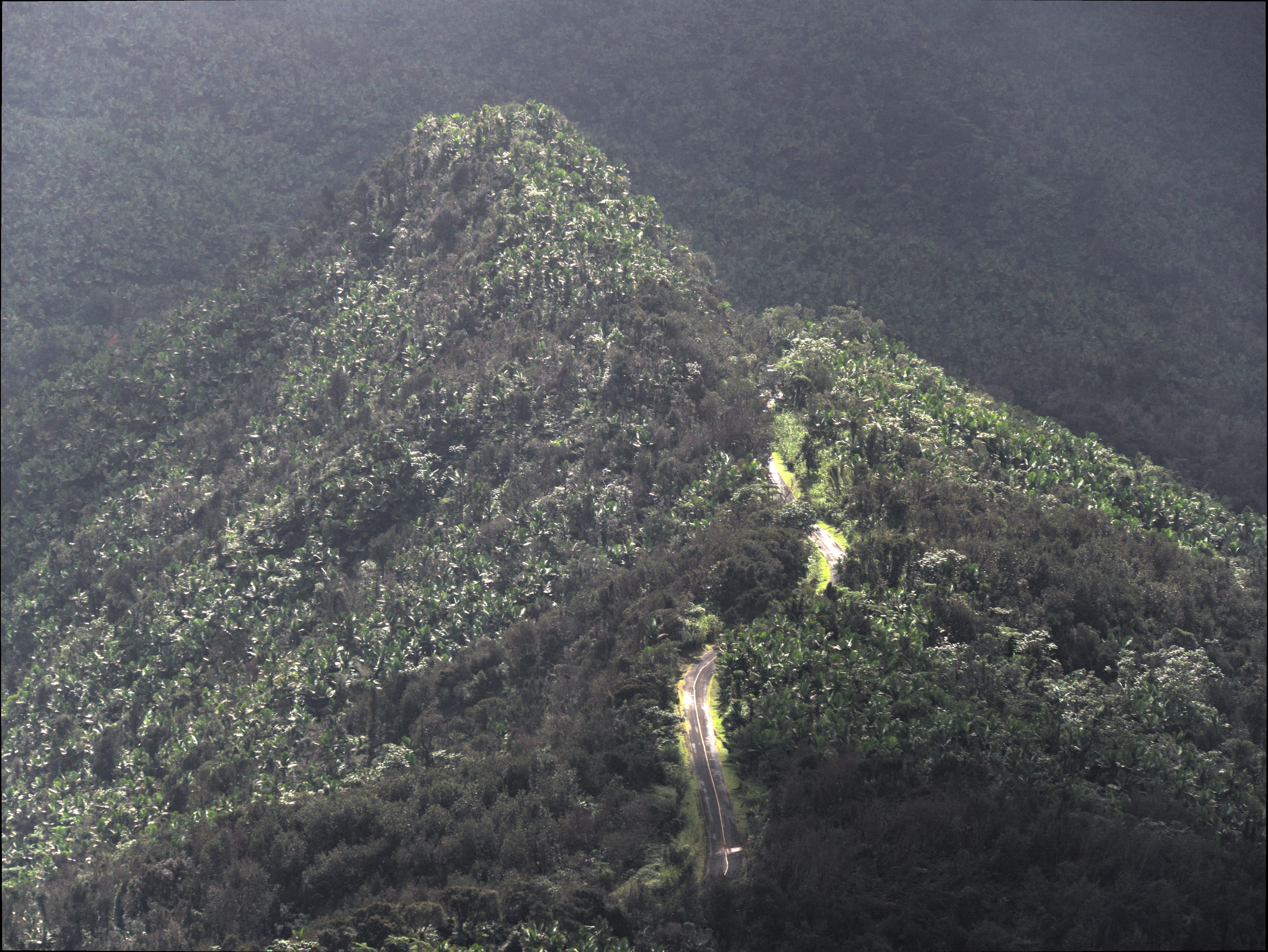
El Yunque from Torre Britton

The mountains are covered with rainforest, much of it in the El Yunque National Forest. About 240 species of native tree have been recorded in the forest, 88 species being considered rare and about 25 species being found nowhere else in the world. There are about 150 species of fern, and on the trees grow many epiphytes, including about 50 species of orchid. Common trees of the Sierra de Luquillo include Cyathea arborea, Prestoea montana, Cecropia peltata, and Ocotea species while Weinmannia pinnata, Brunellia comocladifolia, and Podocarpus coriaceus are found in the cloud forests of the highest peaks. These dwarf forests occur above the cumulus cloud bases and contain low, dense, species-poor vegetation cover known as elfin or pigmy forest. A research study found that between 1936 and 1988, there were 46 landslides associated with heavy rain in the upper regions of the mountains, and these created gaps that allowed the seeds of pioneering tree species to germinate and ferns such as Dicranopteris pectitnata to proliferate. The forest recovers more quickly after a natural disaster, such as a tropical cyclone, than it does after human activities such as logging, charcoal burning, coffee production or agriculture.

Some 127 species of terrestrial vertebrate have been recorded in the forest, including some rarities and some species endemic to Puerto Rico. The Puerto Rican amazon is critically endangered with fewer than 100 left in the wild. The Puerto Rican broad-winged hawk and Puerto Rican sharp-shinned hawk are both very rare. Many birds visit the island during their annual migrations. The Puerto Rican boa inhabits the lower slopes of the mountains, about 14 species of lizard are found in the forest and 13 species of small tree frogs known as coquí live in the canopy and are endemic to the island.
