= Podocarpus coriaceus =

Conservation status
- Least Concern (IUCN 3.1)

Scientific classification
- Kingdom: Plantae
- Clade: Tracheophytes
- Clade: Gymnosperms
- Division: Pinophyta
- Class: Pinopsida
- Order: Araucariales
- Family: Podocarpaceae
- Genus: Podocarpus
- Species: P. coriaceus

Binomial name
- Podocarpus coriaceus Rich.

Synonyms
- Nageia coriacea (Rich.) F.Muell.; Podocarpus antillarum R.Br. ex Mirb., not validly publ.; Podocarpus coriaceus var. sulcatus Pilg.; Podocarpus yacca G.Don, not validly publ.; Taxus lancifolia Wikstr.

Species of conifer

Podocarpus coriaceus, the yucca plum pine, is a species of conifer in the family Podocarpaceae. It is a tree native to the Puerto Rico, the Leeward Islands and Windward Islands, and Trinidad and Tobago.

== Description ==
Podocarpus coriaceus is a small tree rarely exceeding 10 m (33 ft) in height. The bark is thick and smooth when young, growing fissured and flaky with age. The branches are spreading, and often contorted. The leathery leaves grow in opposite pairs and are up to 120 mm (5 in) long and 14 mm (0.6 in) wide. They have parallel sides and straight margins, the upper surface being dark green and the underside dull green. The pollen cones and seed cones grow in the axils of the leaves, the seed cones having short stalks and developing into succulent red fruits about 8 by 6 mm (0.3 by 0.2 in), each containing a single seed.

== Distribution and habitat ==
This tree is endemic to the West Indies where it has a unique distribution. It is found in the arc of islands from Trinidad to Hispaniola but is completely absent from some islands that would appear to have suitable mountains with ideal growing conditions. It occurs on Trinidad, Tobago, St Lucia, Martinique, Dominica, Guadeloupe, Montserrat, Saint Kitts and Nevis, Hispaniola, and Puerto Rico. It mostly occurs above 500 m (1,640 ft) but also grows lower than this on Nevis, Trinidad and Tobago. In Puerto Rico, it occurs in the mountains in the west and in the Sierra de Luquillo in the east, but not the main Cordillera Central range in the centre of the island where the highest mountains are. The reasons for this patchy distribution are unclear. On some islands it grows on poor sandy soil and in Puerto Rico grows in the "elfin forest" on exposed mountain ridges and summits where the vegetation is scrubby and less than 10 m (30 ft) in height.

== Status ==
As a common species in the islands on which it grows, facing no particular threats, the conservation status of P. coriaceus is assessed by the International Union for Conservation of Nature as being of Least Concern.
