= El Yunque National Forest =

Rainforest near Río Grande, Puerto Rico

- Los Picachos and El Yunque peaks El Portal center El Portal exhibit room Mt. Britton Trail Baño de Oro Trail La Coca Falls Mameyes River El Yunque Tower Mt. Britton Tower Yakahú Foggy view of San Juan from Mt. Britton Tower Clear view of Luquillo from Yokahú Tower

- Satellite image of El Yunque (center left)
- Interactive map of El Yunque
- Location: Puerto Rico
- Nearest city: Río Grande
- Area: 28,516 acres (115.40 km^{2})
- Max. elevation: El Toro (1,074 m; 3,524 ft); El Yunque (1,065 m; 3,494 ft)
- Established: January 17, 1903; 123 years ago
- Visitors: 1.2 million (in 2023)
- Governing body: U.S. Forest Service
- Website: www.fs.usda.gov/r08/elyunque

El Yunque National Forest (Spanish: Bosque Nacional El Yunque), most commonly known as El Yunque, is a tropical rainforest with cultural, historical, ecological, scientific, and recreational features in the Sierra de Luquillo mountain subrange in the northeast of the main island of Puerto Rico, managed by the U.S. Forest Service since 1903. Situated immediately outside the urban core of the San Juan metro area, within 40 km (25 mi) east of the Old San Juan historic quarter, Condado and Isla Verde resort areas, Hato Rey business center, and SJU airport, the forest is mostly concentrated in the municipalities of Río Grande, Luquillo, and Naguabo. In addition to being the only tropical rainforest in the U.S. National Forest System, it is the easternmost, southernmost, wettest, and most biodiverse national forest in the U.S.

Covering 28,516 acres (44.556 mi^{2}) of the Sierra de Luquillo mountain subrange, El Yunque is geologically composed primarily of volcaniclastic rocks, mostly basalt and andesite fragments, with significant igneous intrusions of quartz diorite on its the south-central part, all formed underwater during the Early to Late Cretaceous epochs. It has 8 peaks reaching more than 900 m (2,953 ft), of which 5 exceed more than 1,000 m (3,280 ft), including the El Toro, El Yunque, and Los Picachos peaks. It is the source of 10 rivers and 7 watersheds fed by 3,860 mm (152 in) of yearly average rainfall, mostly drained by the Blanco, Espíritu Santo, Loíza, and Mameyes rivers. It has six distinct forest types, namely the gallery forests along waterways, the secondary and tabonuco lowland forests, the palo colorado and palma de sierra mid-elevation forests, and the roblecillo and guayabota cloud forests. These are habitat to 164 vertebrate species and more than 1,000 tree and plant species.

Entrance sign to El Yunque on its main access point, Forest Highway 191 in Río Grande

With about 1.2 million visitors annually, El Yunque is equipped with the El Portal de El Yunque visitor and exhibition center, and the Caimitillo, Palma de Sierra, Puente Roto, Quebrada Grande, and Río Sabana picnic and recreational areas. It has 13 hiking trails of varying difficulty covering about 31 km (19 mi), including the La Coca, Big Tree, La Mina, El Yunque, Mt. Britton, and Trade Winds trails. These not only lead to open-access ponds, streams, and/or waterfalls, some of which feature boulders with pre-Columbian petroglyphs made by the Taíno, who revered the forest as a spiritual site, but they also end at observation towers and platforms on summits, which, depending on cloud cover, offer panoramic views of not only the forest and the mountain subrange, but also of nearby municipalities from Bayamón and San Juan in the west to Vieques and Culebra in the east. The highest visitor parking areas in the forest are near Mt. Britton trail at an elevation of about 760 m (2,493 ft).

El Yunque is a UNESCO Biosphere Reserve, an area protected to demonstrate the values of conservation, operating as an experimental forest under the Luquillo Experimental Forest, which provides scientific research on climate, geology, soils, water resources, flora, fauna, and ecology. Among its investigation stations is the Iguaca Aviary, dedicated to the preservation of the Puerto Rican parrot, a critically endangered species. Additionally, specific areas within the forest are further protected for their scientific, ecological, recreational, and/or scenic value, including the El Toro Wilderness, Baño de Oro Research Natural Area, and Icacos Wild and Scenic River.

== Etymology ==
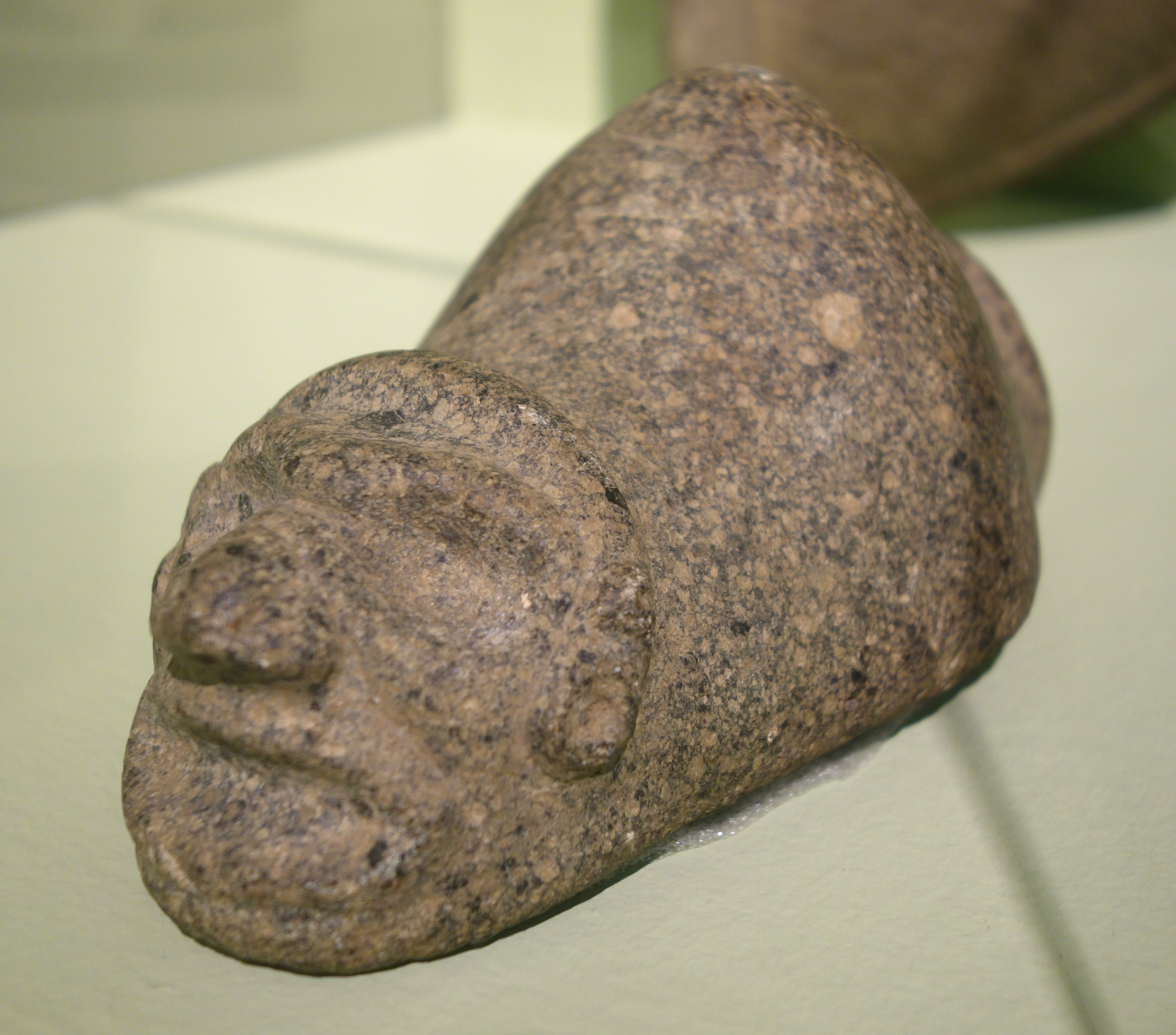
The three-pointed zemi is often said to represent Yokahu.

El Yunque is the name of the mountain peak, Pico El Yunque, the name of the forest, and, colloquially on some occasions, the name for the entire Sierra de Luquillo range. El Yunque most likely comes from or relates to the Spanish word yunque, meaning anvil. This name references the relatively high and flat shape of the Sierra de Luquillo range when observed from the north (El Yunque Peak) or the south (El Toro). It is also said that the Spanish name might have been influenced by the native names for the mountain: Yukén or Yuke possibly meaning "white land", and Luquillo or Yukiyu, another name for the spirit or deity Yokahu and also the name of a legendary cacique, Loquillo. It is not known whether the mountain gives its name to the range or vice versa.

In Puerto Rico, the name of El Yunque is often used in an exchangeable manner between the mountain, the mountain range, and the federally protected forest. While the massif is located within the municipality of Río Grande, El Yunque National Forest today extends over 11,000 hectares (28,000 acres) through the municipalities of Río Grande, Luquillo, Naguabo, Ceiba, Fajardo, Canóvanas, Las Piedras and Juncos, in order of total cover.

== History ==
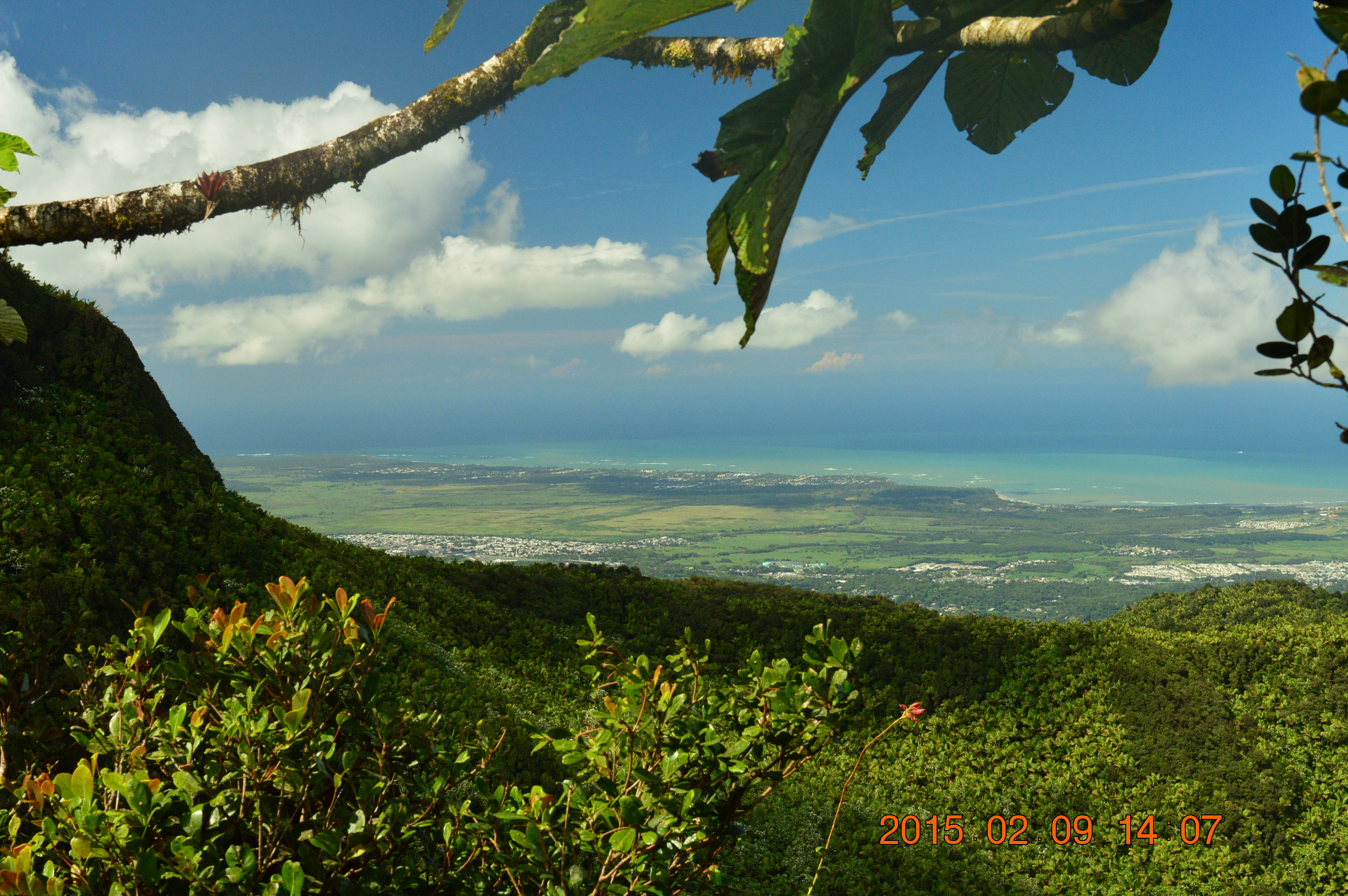
View from the Los Picachos peak in El Yunque

The area of the El Yunque National Forest has been notable since the pre-Columbian era. The forest today is home to several archaeological sites related to the indigenous Taínos, such as the Río Blanco petroglyphs, although no evidence of permanent settlement has been found in the area, which suggests that it was possibly avoided and most likely considered sacred. El Yunque forest is renowned for its unique Taíno petroglyphs.

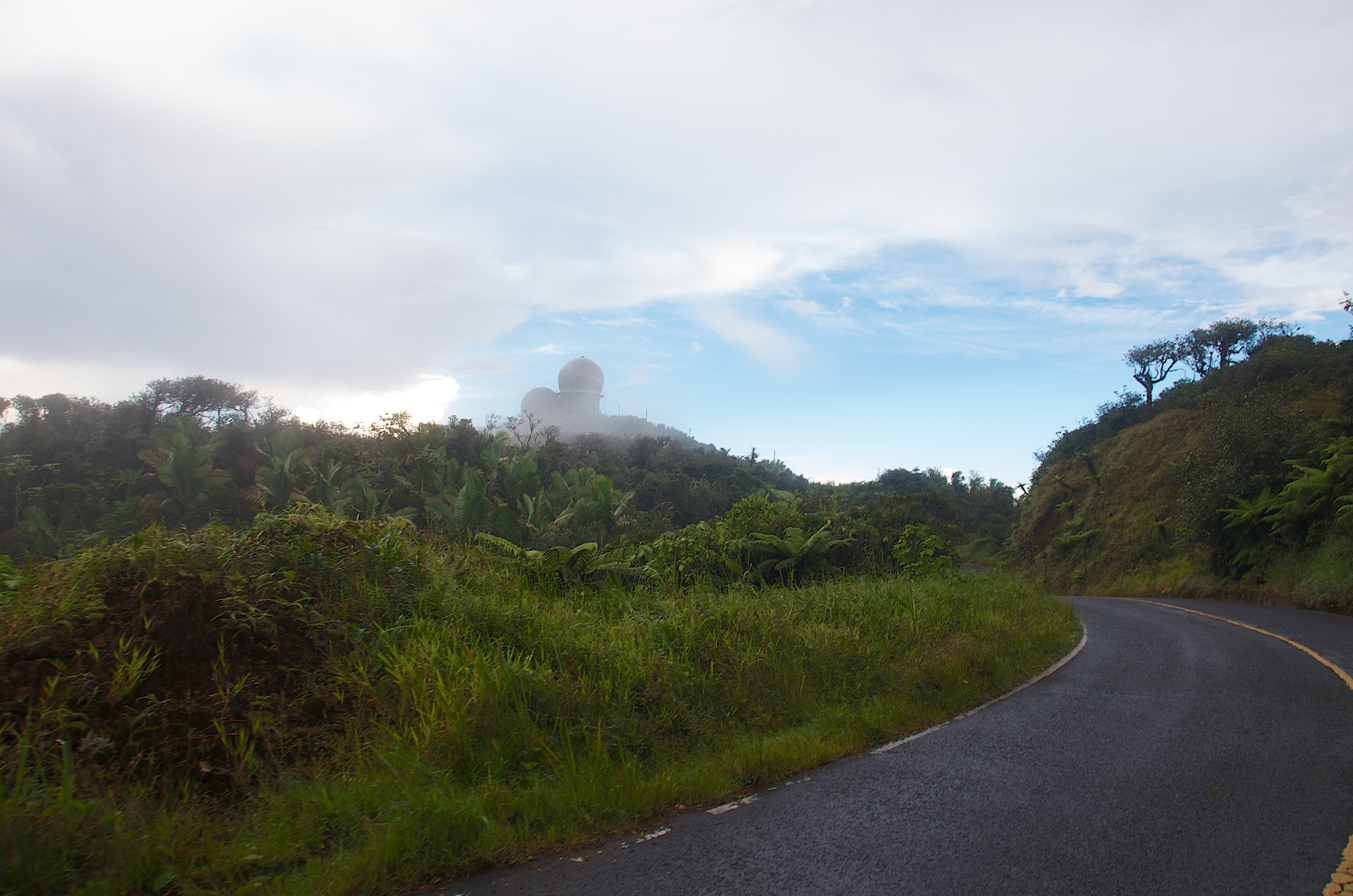
Radar towers, such as this one in Pico del Este, installed by the US Navy during the Second World War.

The Spanish began the conquest the island of Borinquen in 1493, and gold was soon found in the Fajardo and Blanco Rivers in 1509, which sparked interest in gold mining in the area. By 1513 there were gold mines in both river areas and gold was soon found in other rivers of the mountain range such as the Sabana, Prieto, La Mina, Mameyes, Espíritu Santo and Canóvanas rivers. The period of gold mining in the area, however, ended in 1530 when miners and settlers started being attacked by rebelling Taínos, and the area would not be settled again until the 17th century. The area where the El Portal Rainforest Visitor Center is located used to be the site of a coffee plantation named Hacienda Catalina. Coffee was introduced and cultivated in the slopes of El Yunque in the 1730s but the area remained relatively untouched until the 19th century when the lowland forests were exploited for timber and cut down for the development of agriculture, which attracted the attention of the Spanish Crown. The forest during this time was part of the Crown lands of Puerto Rico, and in 1853, the Spanish government sent foresters from the Inspección de Montes (the Spanish Forest Service) to survey the land. Due to the rapid population growth in the island and the poor farming practices of the impoverished European immigrants of the time, the forest region was formally set aside in 1876 by King Alfonso XII of Spain to preserve the soil and water resources and regulate the timber industry in the region. This makes El Yunque one of the oldest reserves in the Western Hemisphere, only four years younger than Yellowstone National Park.

The Spanish Crown ceded Puerto Rico to the United States in 1898. At the time, most of the original forests in Puerto Rico had been either cut down or burned down, and the highlands of the Sierra de Luquillo contained the last remaining tracts of untouched forest in the island. President Theodore Roosevelt set aside the previous Crown Lands of the El Yunque area, and the Luquillo Forest Reserve was established on January 17, 1903, by the United States General Land Office with 266.9 square kilometers (65,950 acres). It became a National Forest in 1906 and was renamed the Caribbean National Forest on June 4, 1935. The forest was still used for timber during the First and Second World Wars and several military installations such as radars and communications infrastructure were installed in the forest, particularly on the highest peaks, such as the early-warning radar site installed in Pico El Yunque to observe and protect against possible incursions by German aircraft and submarines.

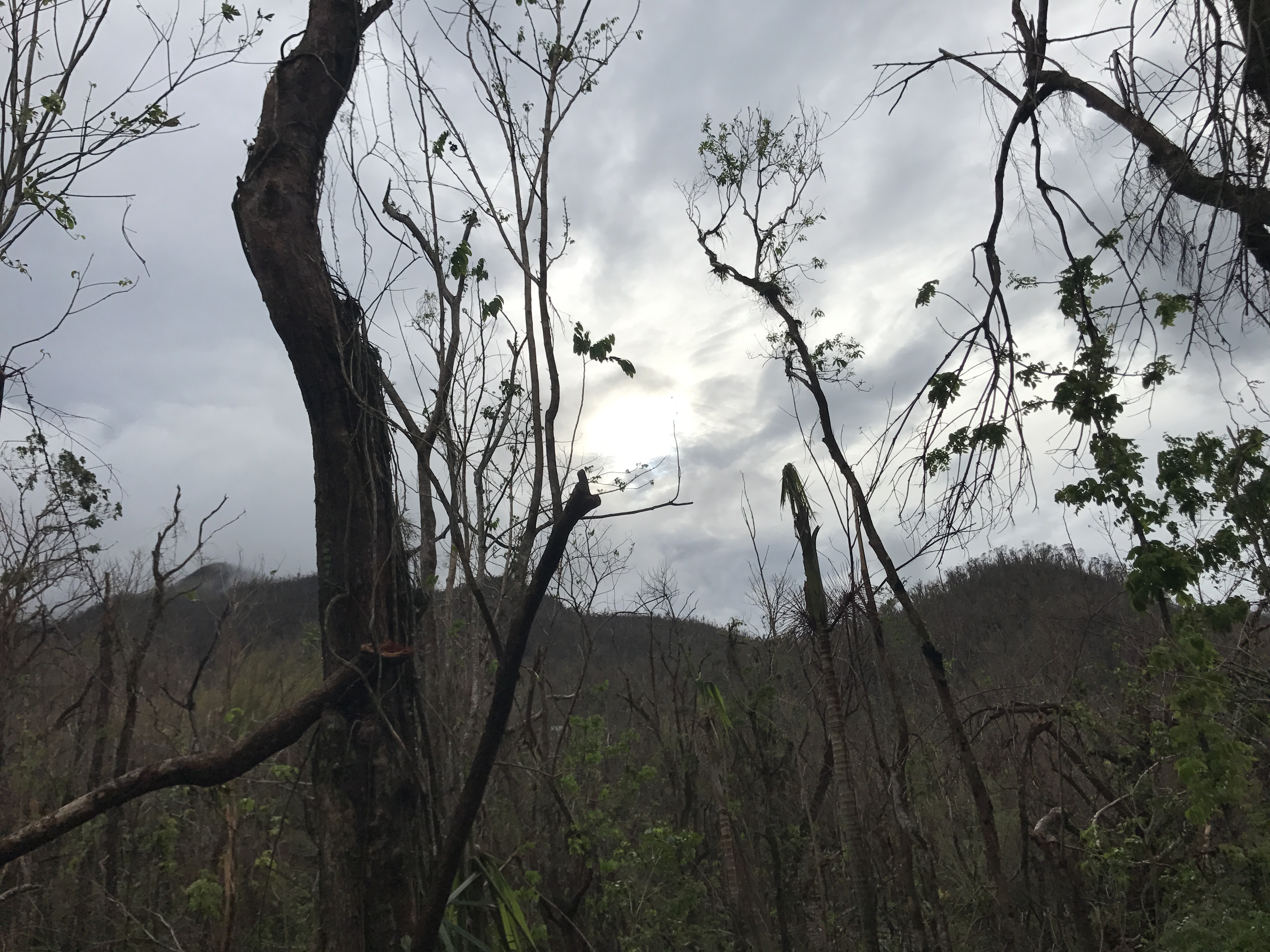
A view of the forest after Hurricane Maria, which hit on September 20, 2017 – the trees were left leafless.

The Caribbean National Forest was designated an Insular Wildlife Refuge by the US Department of Agriculture in 1946, and reforestation efforts were also established between 1934 and 1948 to revitalize the parts of the forest that had been formerly lost due to human activity. The Luquillo Experimental Forest was established in 1956 to promote scientific research and expand conservation efforts for the critically endangered Puerto Rican parrot and the recently discovered yet endangered elfin woods warbler. Most of the recreational infrastructure was developed in the 1980s, and the field offices were moved to their current location in 1981. The National Science Foundation established El Verde Field Station in 1988 under an agreement with the US Forest Service as a primary site for the Luquillo Long-Term ecological Research (Luquillo-LTER, now managed by the University of Puerto Rico, Rio Piedras) to support scientific research of tropical ecosystems due to the occurrence of five out of six of Holdridge's life zones and forest types. The forest was heavily damaged by Hurricane Hugo in 1989 and Hurricane Georges in 1998, and it is estimated that only 23 individual parrots remained in the wild afterward. Between 2000 and 2002, 35 captive parrots were released into the wild as part of a program to save the critically endangered bird. An executive order signed by President George W. Bush on April 2, 2007, changed the name of the Caribbean National Forest to El Yunque National Forest, better reflecting the cultural and historical feelings of the Puerto Rican people. Hurricanes Irma and Maria caused deforestation, landslides and heavy damage to the forest and its infrastructure in 2017, drastically reducing the Puerto Rican parrot population once again. By 2021, the population had begun to recover, and the captive population's reproduction rates also doubled under the supervision of the Fish and Wildlife Service.

The Portal Rainforest Visitor Center reopened at the end of 2021, after being reconstructed following Hurricane Maria. Additionally, the Conservation Trust of Puerto Rico (Fideicomiso de Conservación de Puerto Rico) also maintains a visitor center and contact station managed by its nonprofit unit, Para la Naturaleza. As of 2026, visitor numbers have sharply increased in recent years after Hurricane Maria and the COVID-19 pandemic, prompting proposals to charge admission fees to El Portal and La Mina Recreation Area, the most visited sections of the national forest.

== Climate ==
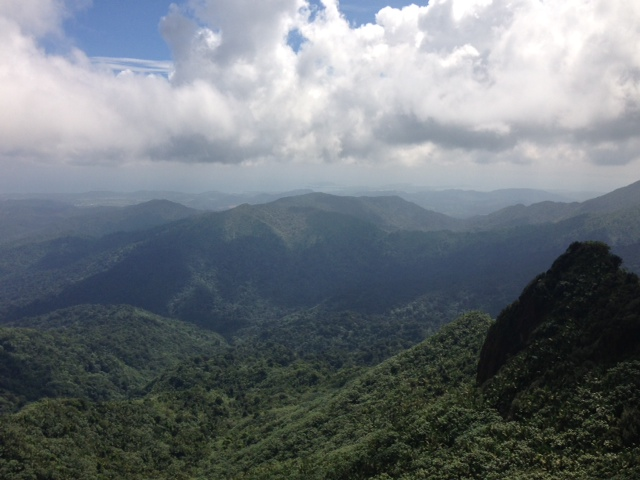
View from the top of Pico El Yunque with exceptional visibility

Puerto Rico has a tropical climate, specifically a tropical rainforest climate, while higher elevations over 910 meters (3,000 ft) border on a subtropical highland climate. There is no distinct wet or dry season in El Yunque; it rains year-round. The temperature and length of daylight remain fairly constant throughout the year. The average temperature in the summer is 27 °C (80 °F) high and 20 °C (68 °F) low and in the winter 22 °C (72 °F) high and 14 °C (58 °F) low, Temperatures can drop below 10 °C (50 °F) on clear nights during the winter, but never below freezing. All of these factors provide a year-round growing season.

== Ecology and conservation ==
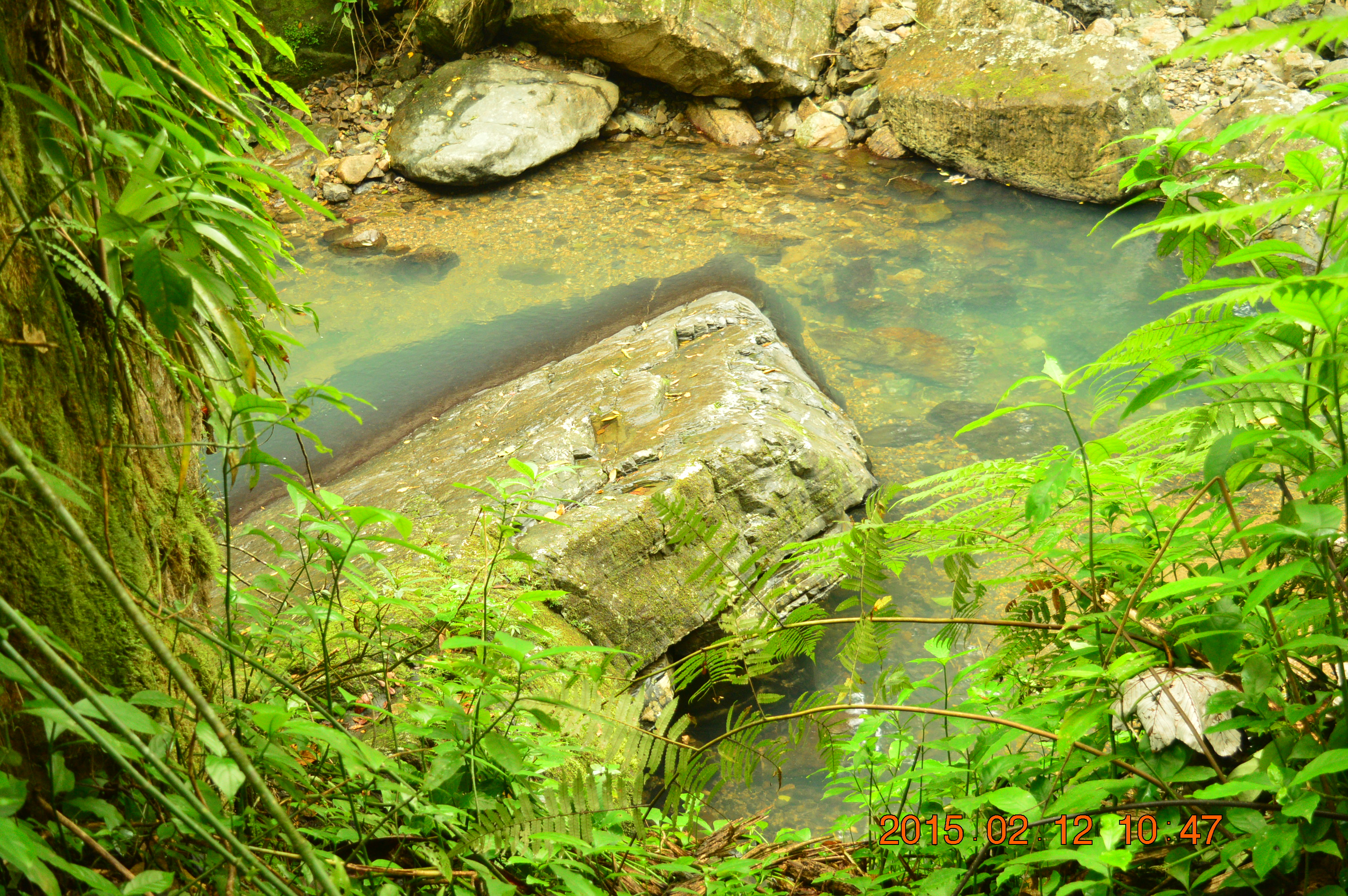
La Mina River and trail in El Yunque – leads to La Mina roaring waterfall and connects to the Big Trees Trail.

Its ecosystem is specifically surveyed by the Management Team of Ecosystems (Equipo de Manejos de Ecosistemas), which is led by Pedro Rios. Due to its location in the northeastern part of Puerto Rico, the incoming trade winds from the Atlantic Ocean bash into the mountains, leading to an excess of rainfall registered at about 240 inches (6.1 m) per year. This process is called orographic lift and accounts for the intense rainfall and constant cloud presence in this mountainous region. This constant cloud cover and persistent winds produced by the adiabatic process of air particles rushing up through the mountainside have affected the morphology of El Yunque, but the most effect has been on the bosque enano or dwarf forest.

The forest is home to over 200 species of trees and plants, 16 of which are endemic to the forest. The critically endangered Puerto Rican amazon (Amazona vittata), with an estimated wild population of 58–80 individuals in the wild, occurred exclusively in this forest until November 19, 2006, when another wild population was released by the Department of Natural Resources in the municipality of Utuado's Río Abajo State Forest.

El Yunque National Forest contains one designated wilderness area, El Toro Wilderness, which is the only tropical rainforest in the United States National Wilderness Preservation System.

=== Baño de Oro Natural Area ===
Baño de Oro Natural Area
- IUCN category Ia (strict nature reserve)
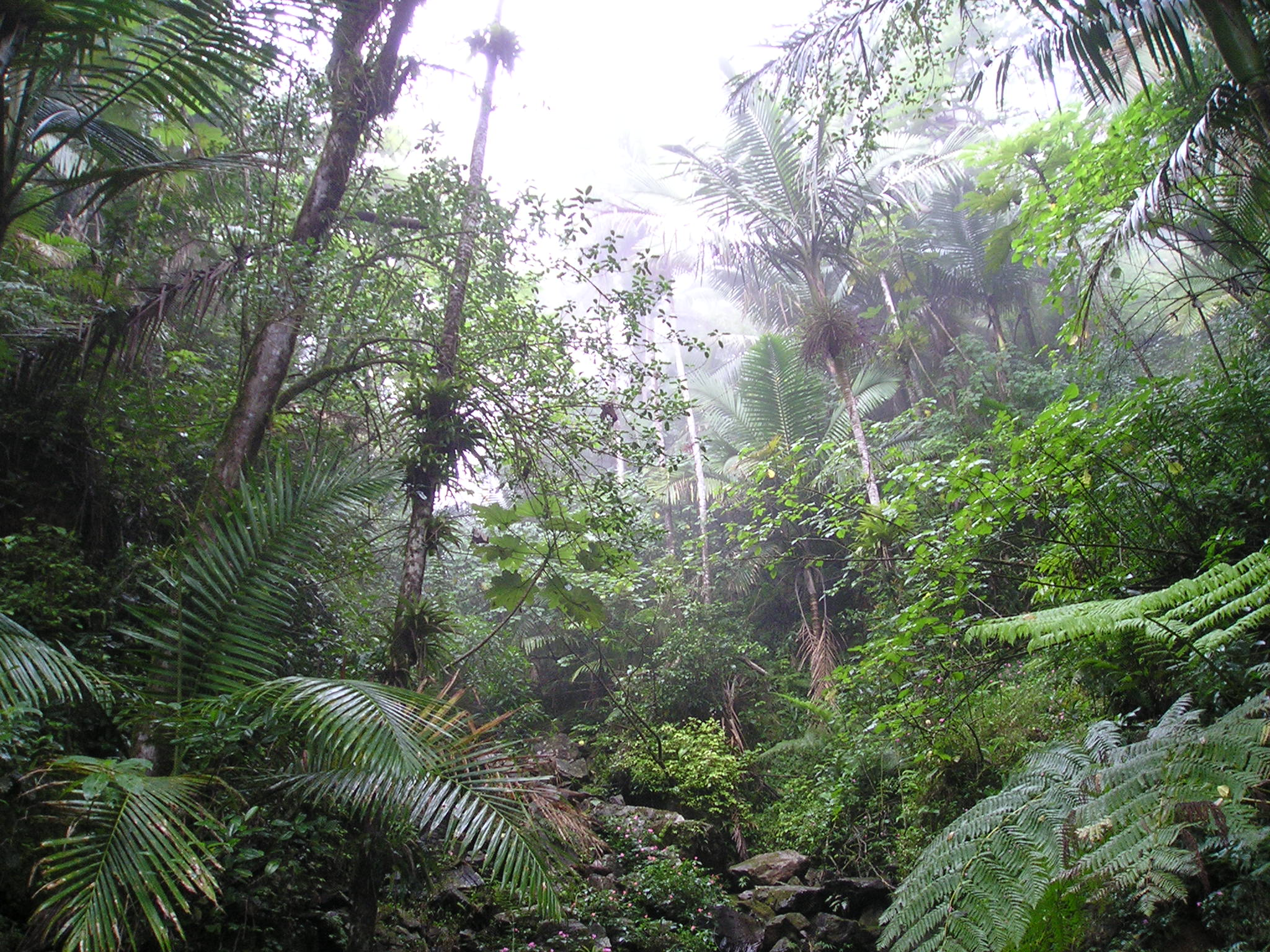
- Interactive map of Baño de Oro Natural Area
- Location: Río Grande, Puerto Rico
- Established: 1949

U.S. National Natural Landmark
- Designated: 1980

The Baño de Oro Natural Area is an 1,840-acre Research Natural Area and National Natural Landmark located within El Yunque National Forest. The Research Natural Area was established by the United States Department of Agriculture's Forest Service in 1949 to preserve a forest area situated between 800 ft. and 3,365 ft. in elevation encompassing two life zones, a rare Pterocarpus swamp, and four major forest types that are free of human disturbance for scientific study, education, and future conservation efforts. The site is also home to seventeen out of the nineteen endemic bird species of Puerto Rico, the most in any particular location in the archipelago. Baño de Oro has been listed as a National Natural Landmark since 1980.

== Flora ==
El Yunque is composed of four different forest vegetation areas: Tabonuco Forest, Palo Colorado Forest, Sierra Palm Forest, and the Dwarf forest. El Yunque forest supports a vast array of animal and plant life that varies depending on the altitude range in the rainforest.

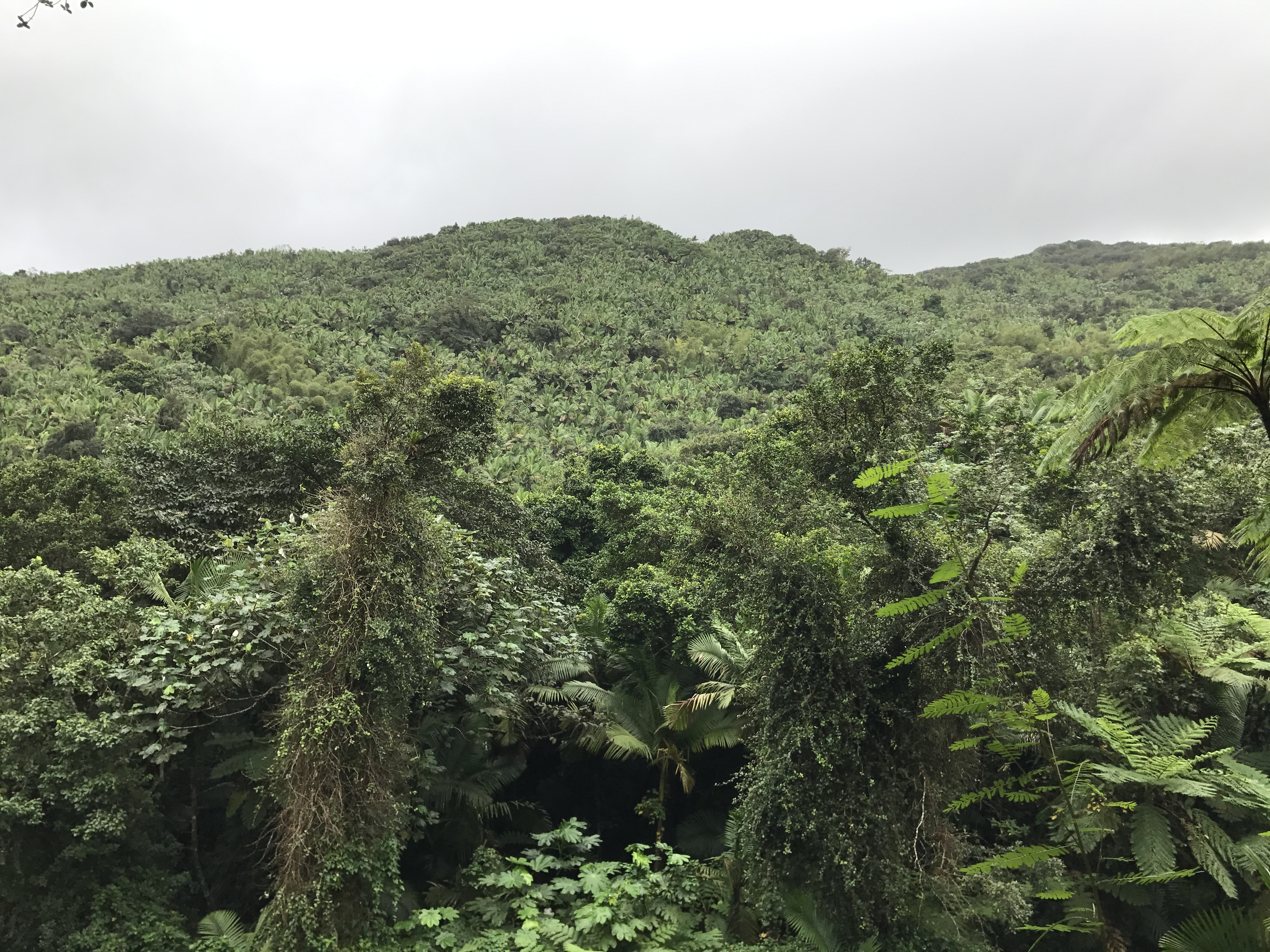
Skyline of the Sierra palm tree forest in El Yunque National Forest from a trail.

=== Sierra palm tree forest ===
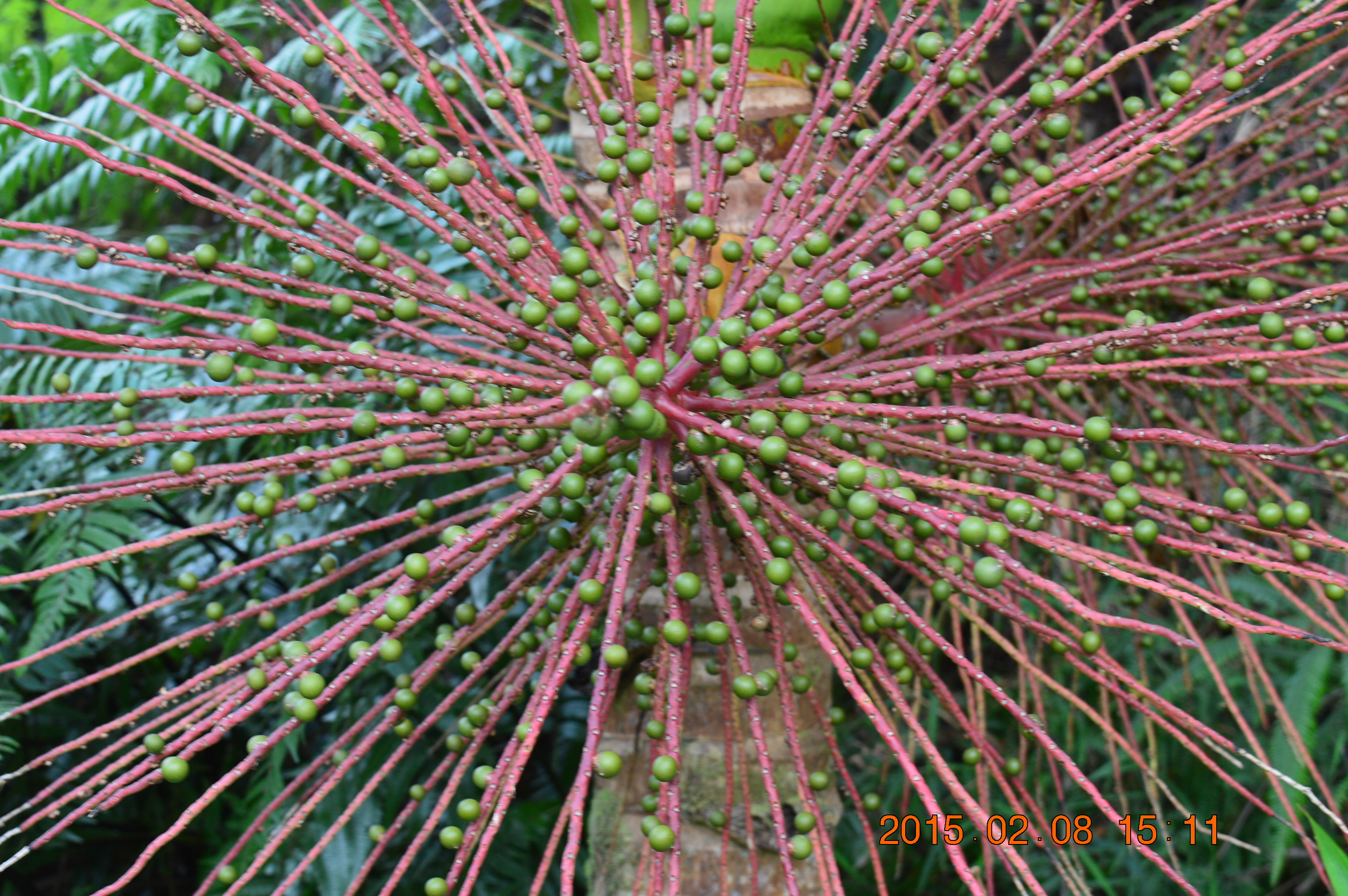
The seeds of the Sierra palm

This forest area is located at 600 meters (1,970 ft) above sea level and is dominated by the Sierra palm tree (Prestoea montana). This palm tree can be found throughout the national forest, but the shallowness of the soil makes it the dominant tree at this height in the forest.

=== Palo colorado forest ===
This forest area is found above 760 meters (2,500 ft) above sea level and is dominated by the palo colorado (Cyrilla racemiflora). The most distinctive feature of this tree is its red, crooked bark, which gives it its Spanish name. These trees are not endemic to the island, but they are native to the region. This forest area is a partial old-growth forest, and some of the palo colorado trees are estimated to be up to 1,000 years old. Due to the shallowness of its bark, the trunks of these trees are commonly used as nesting sites by endangered Puerto Rican parrots (Amazona vittata).

Other trees found in the palo colorado forest area caimitillo (Micropholis garcinifolia), green caimitillo (Micropholis garciniaefolia), yarumo (Cecropia peltata), Caribbean azafran (Hedyosmum arborescens) and the Sierra palm tree (Prestoea montana).

=== Tabonuco forest ===
The tabonuco tree (Dacryodes excelsa) from which this forest area got its name occurs from 200 to 900 meters (660 to 2800 feet) in the mountains of Puerto Rico, as well as other islands that make up the Antilles. The laurel magnolia (Magnolia splendens), an endangered magnolia tree that is endemic to eastern Puerto Rico, can be found in this forest area as well. This forest is very diverse in trees, having over 170 species such as bulletwood (Manilkara bidentata), West Indian giant fern (Cyathea arborea), yarumo (Cecropia peltata), macho yarumo (Didymopanax morototoni), granadillo (Buchenavia capitata) and guaraguao tree (Guarea guidona).

=== Dwarf forest (cloud forest) ===
The dwarf forest ecosystem is located at around 3,000 feet (910 m) and comprises the smallest sub-region in El Yunque forest. The forest is characterized by the variation of vegetation that is only found in Puerto Rico. The vegetation shows stunted growth in which the diameter of the trunk is widened and the number of leaves on the branches is lower than expected. Other specific factors that affect the growth of this sub-region are the high level of acidity and poor water runoff from the soil.

Although many species have adapted to these harsh environments, five species are frequent in the dwarf forest: Ocotea spathulata, Tabebuia rigida, Calyptranthes krugii, Eugenia borinquensis, and Calycogonium squamulosum. The other abundant type of plants in the dwarf forest is epiphytes. The great amount of competition in the canopy does not allow lower-level plants to develop and prosper. The characteristic of having a widened tree trunk is ideal for epiphytes that require a host to live on. Therefore, a substantial number of epiphytic plants have cemented their existence in the flora of El Yunque forest, specifically in the dwarf forest, due to the moisture, precipitation, and protection from the sun.

== Fauna ==
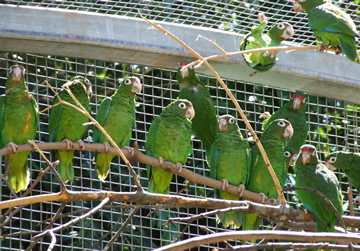
Puerto Rican parrots at the aviary in El Yunque

The national forest is home to numerous species of animals, many of which are endemic to Puerto Rico. In addition to the critically endangered Puerto Rican parrot, other endangered species found in the forest are the Puerto Rican broad-winged hawk (Buteo platypterus brunnescens), the Puerto Rican sharp-shinned hawk (Accipiter striatus venator), the Elfin woods warbler (Setophaga angelae), and the Puerto Rican boa (Epicratus inornatus). The white-necked crow (Corvus leucognaphalus), which used to be found in the region, has been completely extirpated from the island and is now only found in Hispaniola.

Other animals found within the forest boundaries are the Puerto Rican euphonia (Chlorophonia sclateri), the Puerto Rican oriole (Icterus portoricensis), the Puerto Rican emerald (Riccordia maugaeus), the Antillean crested hummingbird (Orthorhyncus cristatus), the Puerto Rican vireo (Vireo latimeri), the red fruit bat (Stenoderma rufus), the Puerto Rican giant anole (Anolis cuvieri) and the Puerto Rican twig anole (Anolis occultus). The endangered American eel (Anguilla rostrata), the fat sleeper fish (Dormitator maculatus), the bigmouth sleeper fish (Gobiomorus dormitor), big claw river shrimp (Macrobrachium carcinus) and the bocú shrimp (Macrobrachium crenulatum) are found in the rivers and creeks that originate and flow from El Yunque.

El Yunque National Forest has been recognized as a global Important Bird Area by BirdLife International since 2007. Since 2020, it has also been a federally designated critical habitat for the elfin-woods warbler along with the Carite and Maricao State Forests.

=== Puerto Rican Amazon ===
The Puerto Rican parrot or Puerto Rican amazon is a little parrot that measures 28–30 centimeters (11.0–11.8 in). The bird is a predominantly green parrot with a red forehead and white rings around the eyes. The species is the only remaining native and endemic parrot in Puerto Rico. For many years since the mid 20th-century, El Yunque was the last remaining habitat of this species, serving as a "recovery ark", after it was extirpated from the island where it used to exist in large numbers across many regions such as the Cordillera Central, the Sierra de Cayey and the Northern Karst region. Before the pass of Hurricane Maria in 2017, the total estimated population in 2012 was 58–80 individuals in the wild and over 300 individuals in captivity. As of 2025, the reintroduction programs have proved growingly successful with a total population of about 1,000 wild individuals, with the largest local population now residing in the Rio Abajo State Forest (in the Northern Karst region between the municipalities of Arecibo and Utuado), with El Yunque itself now supporting the second largest population, and a third growing one being re-established in the southwestern rainforest area of the Maricao State Forest.

=== Coqui ===
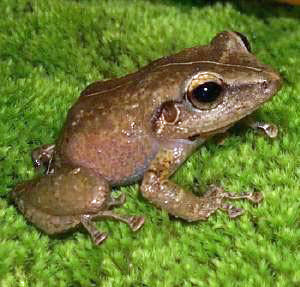
A common coqui

Approximately 16 species of common coqui, members of the diverse neotropical frog genus Eleutherodactylus, are known in Puerto Rico. Of these 16, 13 have been found in El Yunque National Forest. This small frog earned its Puerto Rican common name due to the call of the most common coqui species in Puerto Rico, Eleutherodactylus coqui, which begins as the sun sets and ends in early dawn. This has made it an animal of great endearment to Puerto Ricans, and in contemporary times, the coqui has become a symbol of Puerto Ricans.

Although the coqui is an amphibian, it possesses some features that are unusual in frogs. These differences are seen mainly in its morphology, reproduction, and developmental stages. In terms of morphology, the coqui does not have webbing between its toes because it is a tree dweller in moist environments. Another significant difference is that it does not have a definite larval stage, and the eggs laid by the female are terrestrial instead of aquatic. This means that a miniature froglet, rather than a tadpole, arises from the incubation period.

Other species of coqui found in the forest are the grass coqui (Eleutherodactylus brittoni), Eneida's coqui (Eleutherodactylus eneidae), the cricket coqui (Eleutherodactylus gryllus), Hedrick's coqui (Eleutherodactylus hedricki), the web-footed coqui (Eleutherodactylus karlschmidti), the locust coqui (Eleutherodactylus locustus), the upland or forest coqui (Eleutherodactylus portoricensis), the bronze or Richmond's coqui (Eleutherodactylus richmondi), the dwarf coqui (Eleutherodactylus unicolor) and the melodious or wrinkled coqui (Eleutherodactylus wightmanae).

=== Arthropods ===
Per a study published in October 2018, by Bradford C. Lister and Andres Garcia, arthropod biomass in the Luquillo rainforest data taken during the 1970s, compared to 30 years later, has fallen 10 to 60 times. The study revealed synchronous declines in the lizards, frogs, and birds that eat arthropods. The study indicated that climate warming is the driving force behind the collapse of the forest's food web. Over the past 30 years, forest temperatures have risen 2.0 °C.

== Recreation ==
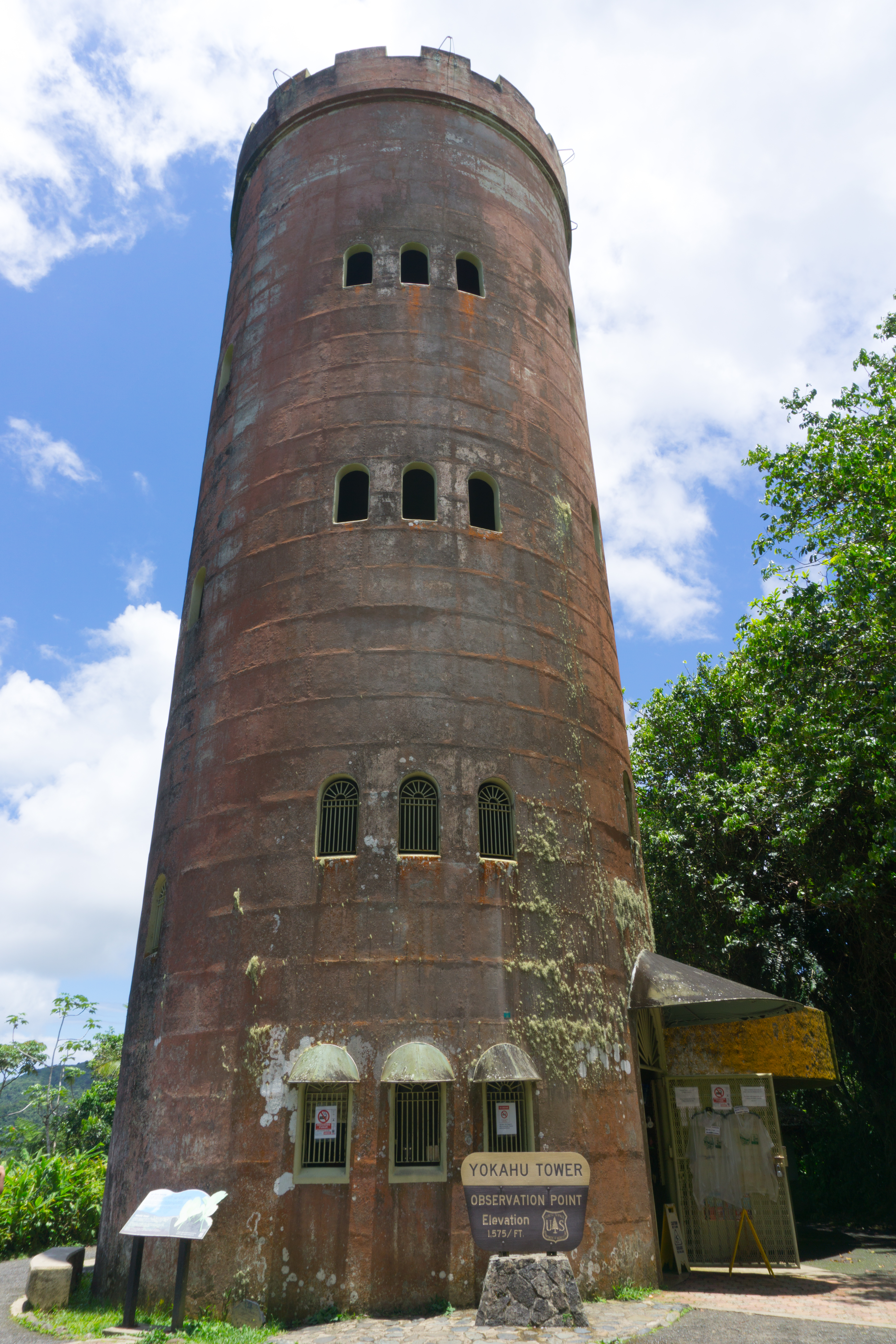
Yokahu Tower

In addition to being an important ecological forest reserve, El Yunque National Forest is one of the most popular tourist attractions in Puerto Rico, both for locals and visitors, and it offers numerous recreational opportunities such as picnicking, birdwatching, and biking in designated areas. Camping is allowed in designated areas (depending on the size of the group), and there are also cabins available for rent. Additionally, the forest is known for its vista points and observation towers: Yokahu Tower and Mount Britton Tower.

=== Hiking Trails ===
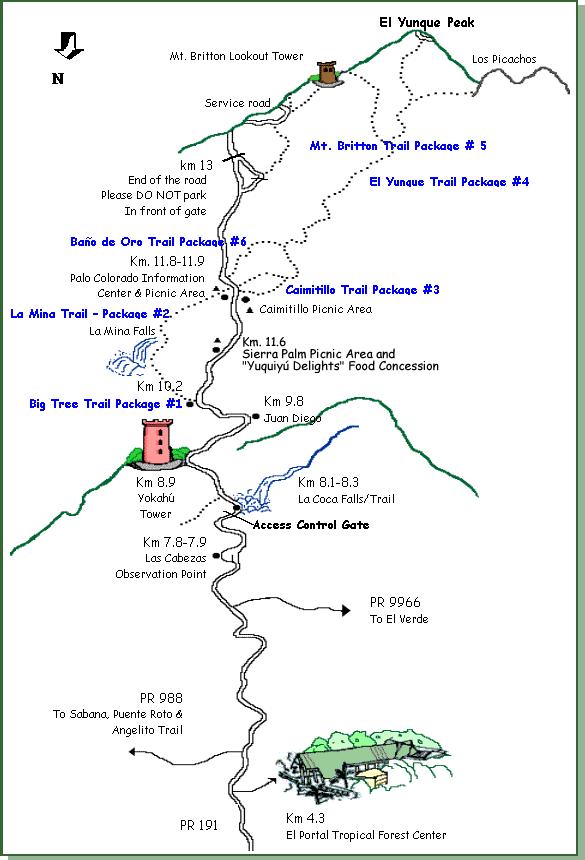
A map of hiking trails and landmarks along PR-191 in El Yunque National Forest

Hiking is probably the most popular activity in El Yunque National Forest. The forest offers several trails with varying difficulties. The 57.8-kilometer (35.9 mi) long Puerto Rican Northeast Trail also connects to and traverses through El Yunque.

==== Pico El Yunque ====
Pico El Yunque Trail (or just El Yunque Trail) is the main hiking trail (or at least the most popular) of the forest and it extends for about 8.7 kilometers (5.4 mi) that lead to the summit of El Yunque, the second highest point of the Sierra de Luquillo. Although considered moderate in difficulty, some of its side trails are considered to be more challenging; the trail itself has an elevation gain of 533 meters (1,748 ft). The trailhead is located close to the end of PR-191 and La Mina Falls, next to the Palo Colorado Information Center, in an area of the national forest often referred to as the La Mina Recreational Area. The trail crosses all four biomes of the national forest. It is open year-round, and dogs are also allowed on this trail but must be kept on a leash at all times.

==== Mount Britton Tower ====
Mt. Britton Tower Trail is a small 2.6-kilometer (1.6 mi) trail that starts at El Yunque Trail and crosses a Sierra palm forest on the way to the top of Mount Britton, the 8th tallest peak in the forest. The summit is part of the cloud forest and it hosts a small lookout tower built by the Civilian Conservation Corps in 1937 that on clear days offers views of both the Atlantic Ocean and the Caribbean Sea. The trail has an elevation gain of approximately 200 meters (650 ft), and although it is rated as moderate to difficult.

==== Los Picachos ====
The very short but steep Pico El Yunque Trail starts and extends for a little more than 0.32 kilometers (0.2 mi) to the top, where a stone masonry platform offers a 360 panoramic view of the surrounding mountains and the eastern coast of Puerto Rico. The vegetation along this trail belongs to that of the rare dwarf forest ecosystem which features "dwarf trees" such as the miniature tree Clusia clusioides, and equally small species of animals such as the dwarf anole (Anolis occultus) and the endangered elfin woods warbler (Setophaga angelae). This ecological zone is also known as the elfin woodlands. Although very short, the trail difficulty is classified as moderate to difficult.

==== Caimitillo ====
This is a short and easy 0.64-kilometer (0.4 mi) trail that begins close to the Sierra Palm Visitor Center on PR-191. The trail crosses a rainy forest primarily inhabited by tree ferns (Cyathea arborea and Alsophila dryopteroides) and Sierra palm trees. The trail leads to the Caimitillo picnic area. Dogs are also allowed on this trail, but must be kept on a leash at all times.

==== Angelito ====
The Angelito Trail is an easy, short 1.1-kilometer (0.7 mi) long trail that crosses the tabonuco forest zone and leads to the Las Damas Pool, also known as Charco Angelito, a series of natural pools along the Mameyes River. Although the trail is easy, visitors must be cautious of the weather since the area is prone to flash flooding. The trail and area were heavily damaged during Hurricane Maria in 2017, but it has recently reopened. Dogs are allowed on the trail but must be kept on a leash. The trailhead is located on PR-988. This trail is the only one in the forest to be located in the municipality of Luquillo.

==== La Coca ====
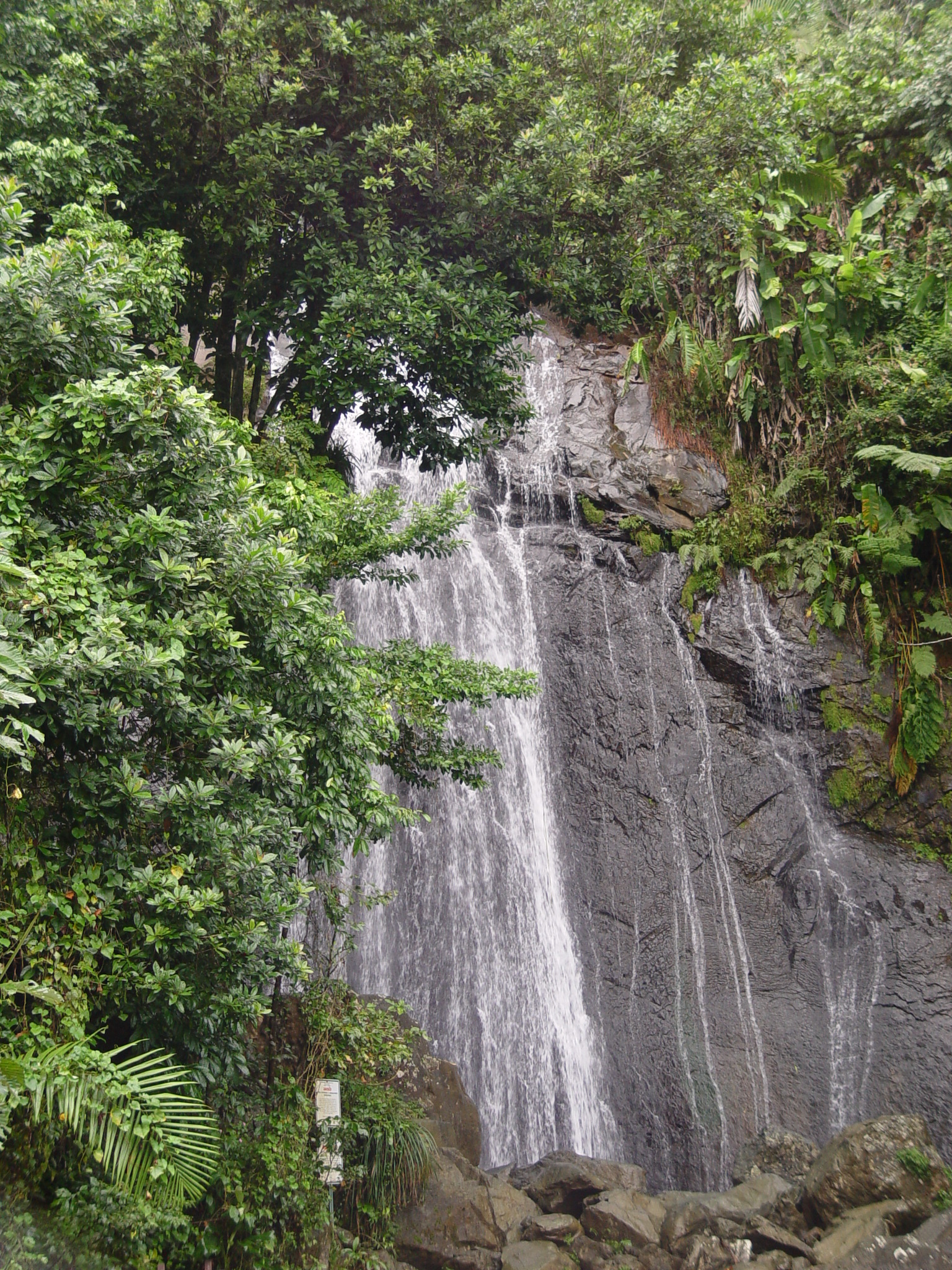
Coca Falls

This trail is a 2.9-kilometer (1.8 mi) one-way trail that is considered to be very challenging, not necessarily for its steepness but for the density of the forest foliage it crosses. The trail crosses numerous small streams, waterfalls, and a tabonuco tree forest and leads to the lush Mameyes Wild & Scenic River area. This is one of the rainiest parts of the national forest, which means the trail is often muddy and slippery, so appropriate hiking shoes are necessary. Due to the dense forest in the area, most disappearances in the forest occur along this trail, so it is important not to walk off the trail under any circumstances. The trailhead is located on PR-191.

==== La Mina ====
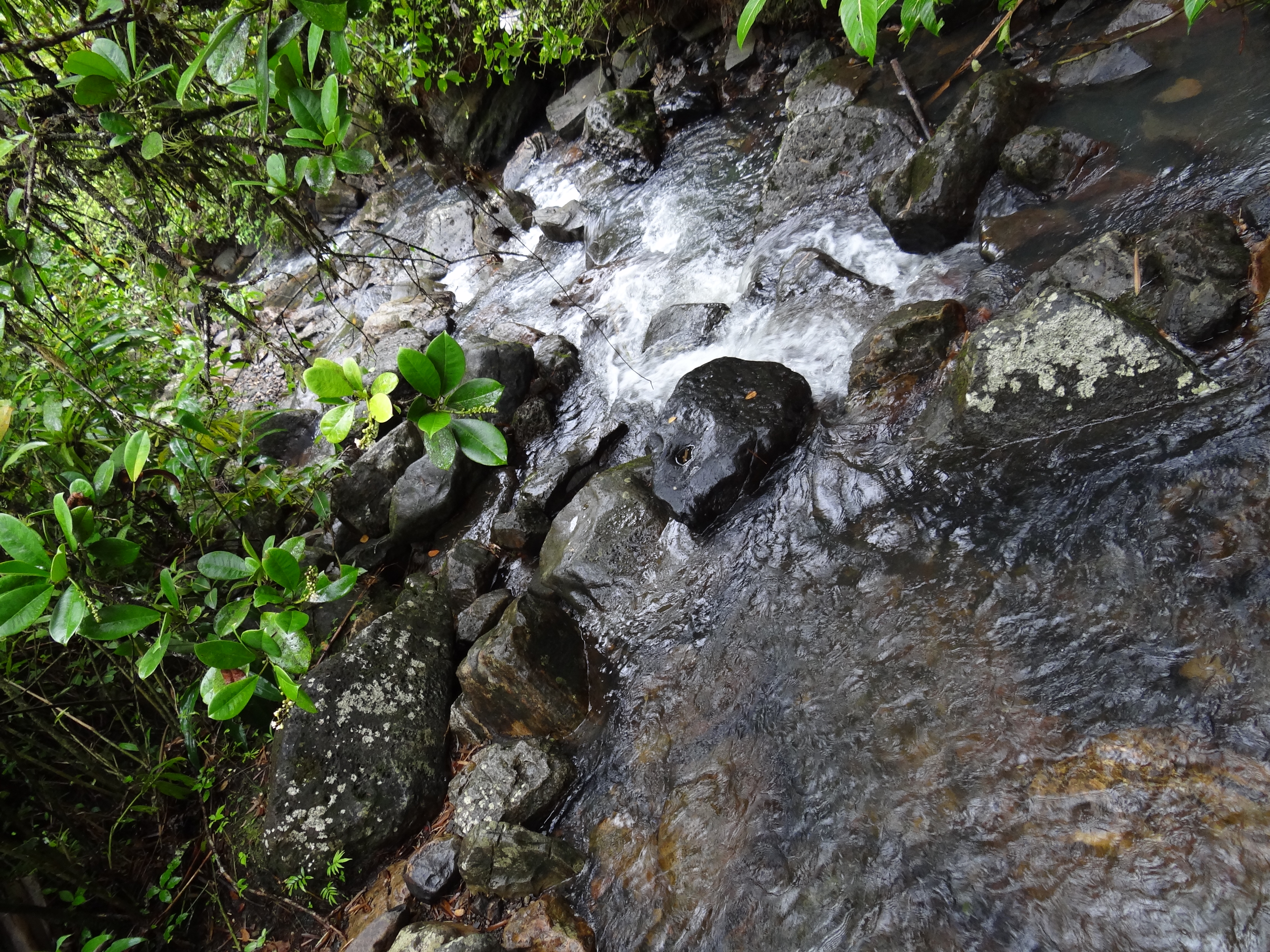
Hike to La Mina Falls

La Mina Trail is closed as of 2021 due to the damage caused by Hurricane Maria in 2017. La Mina Trail is a moderate to difficult 1.1-kilometer (0.7 mi) long trail that starts on PR-191 close to the Palo Colorado Information Center. This is another popular hiking trail as it leads to La Mina Falls, one of the most picturesque waterfalls of the national forest. The trail also follows the course of La Mina River, also included in the National Wild and Scenic Rivers System, and offers opportunities for swimming in the pool located by La Mina Falls.

==== Big Tree ====
This is a paved 1.6-kilometer (1 mi) long self-guided interpretative trail that offers hikers the opportunity to come close to some of the largest trees in the national forest, the tabonuco tree (Dacryodes excelsa). Although paved, the trail is considered moderate as it is steep in some sections. It ends at La Mina Falls, close to a picnic area. The trail is closed as of 2021 due to the damage caused by Hurricane Maria in 2017.

==== Río Sabana ====
This trail is one of the few to be located in the municipality of Naguabo, in the southern portion of the national forest. The trailhead is located on the southern section of PR-191, and it hosts bathrooms and a picnic area. The trail was originally built by the Civilian Conservation Corps in the 1930s and remained closed for many decades, but it was finally reopened in 2011 as part of the Sabana Recreation Area. This trail is considered difficult as it crosses dense forest and remote steep areas; it extends 3.5 kilometers (2.2 mi) and it connects to the El Toro and Tradewinds Trails in El Toro National Wilderness.

==== El Toro, Tradewinds ====
El Toro Wilderness Trail is one of the most remote and challenging trails in El Yunque National Forest. It extends for 4.7 kilometers (2.9 mi) on its paved section, where it connects to the Río Sabana and the Tradewinds trails. When including the unpaved section (also known as the Tradewinds Trail), the trail extends for almost 8.0 kilometers (5 mi) and it leads to El Toro, which at 328 meters (1,075 ft) is the highest point in both the national forest and eastern Puerto Rico. The trail crosses all four forest biomes through the municipalities of Canóvanas, Río Grande, Las Piedras (at El Toro's summit), and Naguabo, fully within El Toro National Wilderness. This part of the national forest is the best ecologically preserved and it is home to numerous endemic and endangered species such as the Puerto Rican parrot, the Puerto Rican boa, the elfin woods warbler, the red fruit bat, and at least five species of coquis. The trailhead is located on PR-186 in a section of the road known as the El Toro Scenic Byway, in Cubuy, Canóvanas. Both the El Toro and Tradewinds trails are listed as National Recreation Trails.

=== Swimming ===
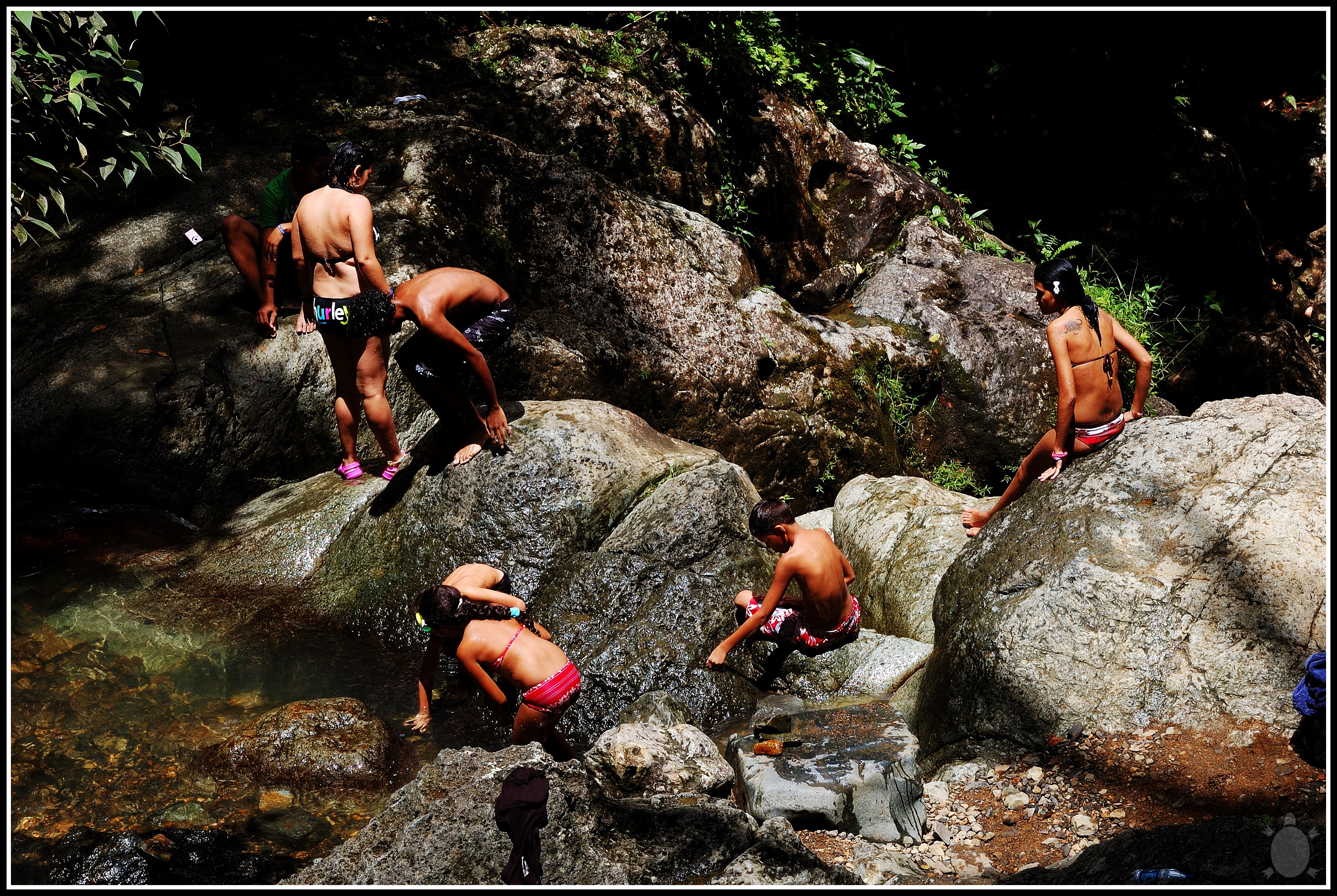
Kids at play at El Yunque rainforest in 2007

El Yunque National Forest offers many opportunities for swimming in natural pools often found at the base of waterfalls, such as that of La Mina Falls and the Juan Diego area off PR-191. Some areas available for swimming are the Quebrada Grande Recreation Area and the Espíritu Santo Observation Point off PR-186, the Sabana Recreation Area off the southern section of PR-191 in Naguabo, and the Angelito and Puente Roto Recreation Areas off PR-988 in Luquillo. Most of these areas are prone to flash flooding and, as such, they are often closed according to weather conditions.

Baño Grande and Baño de Oro are two former swimming pools and recreational areas popular between the 1930s and 1960s. These manmade pools were built by the Civilian Conservation Corps during the New Deal era by damming creeks belonging to the La Mina River watershed. They were closed due to a series of drownings and other safety issues. Although swimming is no longer possible at these pools, they are preserved as historic sites and have been listed in the National Register of Historic Places due to their historic and architectural value since 2017 and 2020, respectively. Baño de Oro now serves as a watershed garden and Baño Grande is now a popular scenic spot.

== El Portal Rainforest Center ==
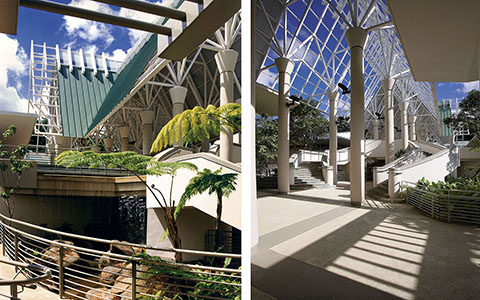
El Portal Rainforest Center

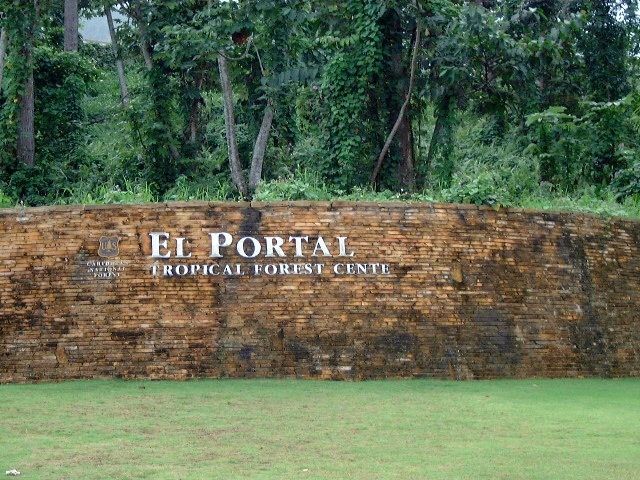
El Portal Rainforest Center of El Yunque National Forest in Puerto Rico

Opened in 1996, the El Portal Rainforest Center was designed by Segundo Cardona, FAIA of Sierra Cardona Ferrer Architects, to give visitors an introduction to what the rainforest looks like. Built on a 28,434-acre tropical forest, the Portal was built as a model headquarters for ecotourism and economic development and training, the center was built to educate those concerned about the wellbeing of the Caribbean National Forest and preserve the unique tropical forest heritage and environment. It is located within the national forest in the municipality of Río Grande.

A walkway set at 60 feet (18 m) above the ground allows for a view of the tops of trees, and another walkway winds along tree bases. Exhibits at the center focus on the plants and animals of the rainforest, the importance of rainforests around the world, and threats to rainforests and efforts to conserve them.

The entry experience begins atop an elevated walkway that unites the facility with the surrounding forest and provides views of the mountain peaks, the ocean, and reforested terrain. The Center contains 880 square meters (9,500 ft^{2}) of exhibits, an enclosed theater, conference center, classrooms, and laboratories, as well as administrative offices. To preserve natural conditions, care was taken to use existing openings for roads, parking areas, and buildings, while the arrival sequence and parking lots were designed with contours to save existing trees.

The Portal has survived several major hurricanes, including Hurricane Georges. On September 21, 2017, Hurricane Maria caused major damage to the center, and renovations are underway as of 2020. El Portal Rainforest Center reopened to visitors in January 2022.

== Miscellaneous ==
El Yunque National Forest has been incorrectly called the only rainforest in the United States National Forest Service, (Note: See, for example, Puerto Rico – Nature and Scientific Wonders. Smithsonian Institution. November 6, 2007. Retrieved August 15, 2013; Frommer's Puerto Rico. Frommer's Introduction to El Yunque. Retrieved August 15, 2013;Puerto Rico Chapter Marks Milestones, Looks Ahead. Sierra Club. Retrieved August 15, 2013;Hiking in Puerto Rico. Matthew Gilbertson and Amanda Morris. March 25, 2011. Retrieved August 15, 2013.) but it is actually the only tropical rainforest. There are others that are temperate rainforests including some in Alaska and the Pacific Northwest.

In 2002, the U.S. Congress designated areas bounded by the Río Mameyes, Río de la Mina, and Río Icacos in the Caribbean National Forest as components of the National Wild and Scenic Rivers System.

In 2021, Nikolai Mushegian bought a 288-acre (~1,17 square kilometers) plot of land adjacent to El Yunque National Forest for $2.2 million, and in 2022 he pledged to donate the plot to the United States Forest Service in order to support land and ecosystem conservation in Puerto Rico. The donation, thought to be the largest land donation to El Yunque in several decades, was completed by Nikolai's parents after his death.

Contrary to the popular assumption, El Yunque Peak is not the highest mountain in either the Sierra de Luquillo or Puerto Rico. The highest mountain of the Sierra de Luquillo is El Toro, also located in the national forest, while the highest mountain in Puerto Rico is Cerro de Punta in the Cordillera Central on the border between Jayuya and Ponce.

El Yunque is also the object of Puerto Rican folklore and pop culture. Along with the coqui and the Puerto Rican parrot, El Yunque is considered a symbol of Puerto Rico and Puerto Ricans. Along with the former two, it was chosen to be Puerto Rico's entry in the America the Beautiful Quarters program. Puerto Rico's only National Park Service site, San Juan National Historic Site had already been featured on the District of Columbia and United States Territories Quarters in 2009.

== Gallery ==
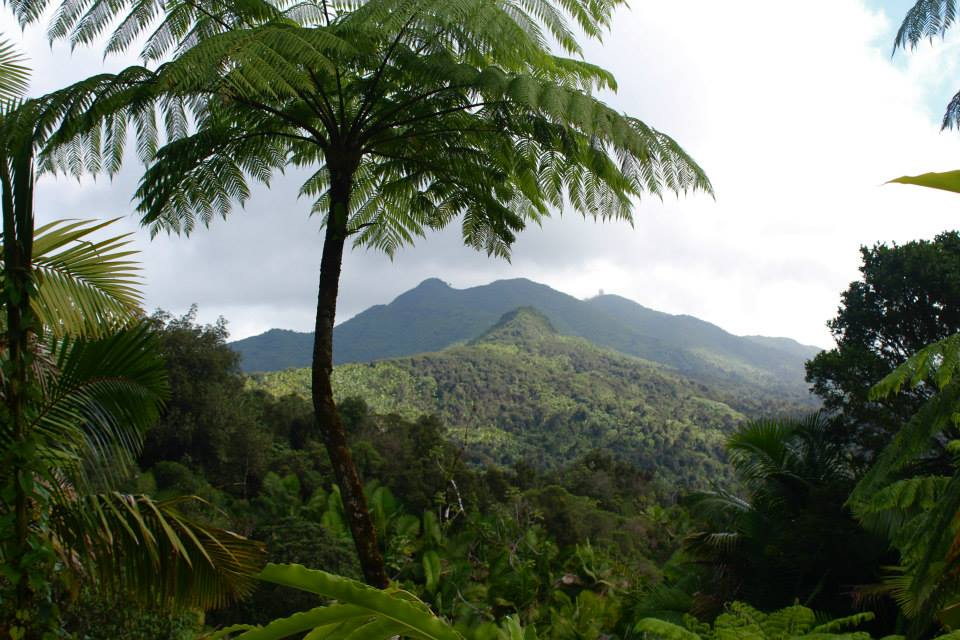

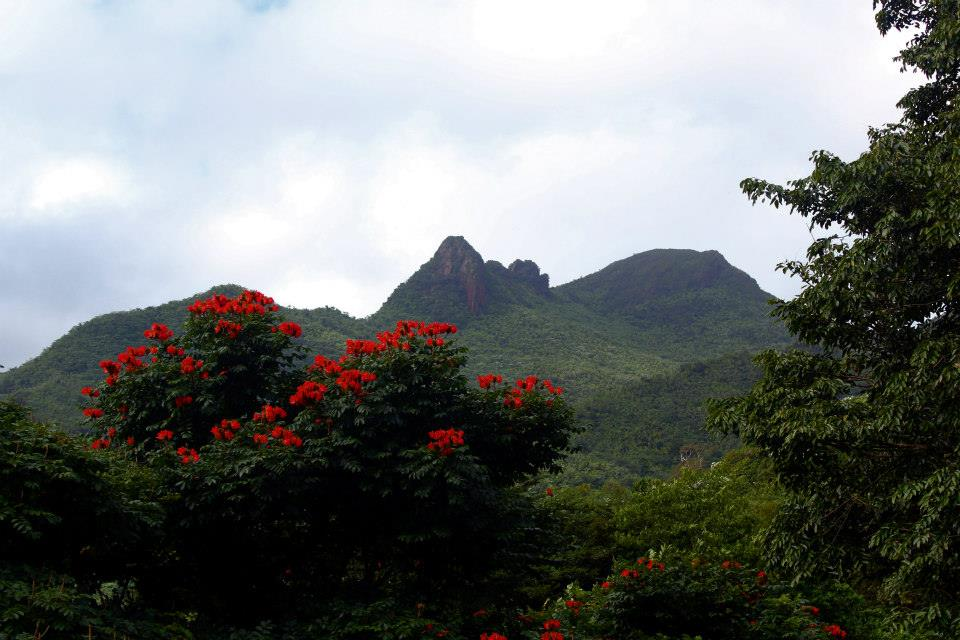

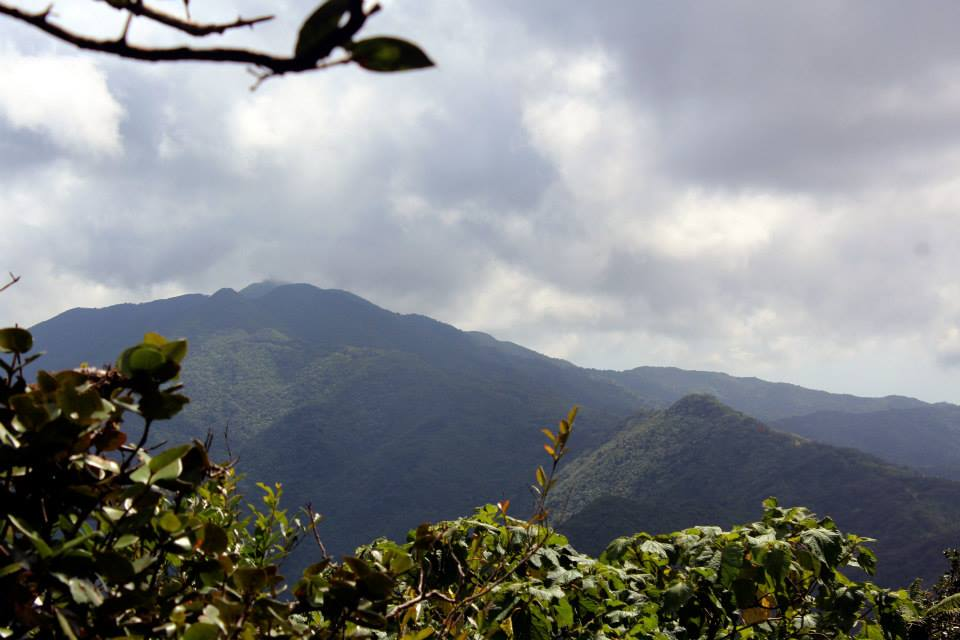

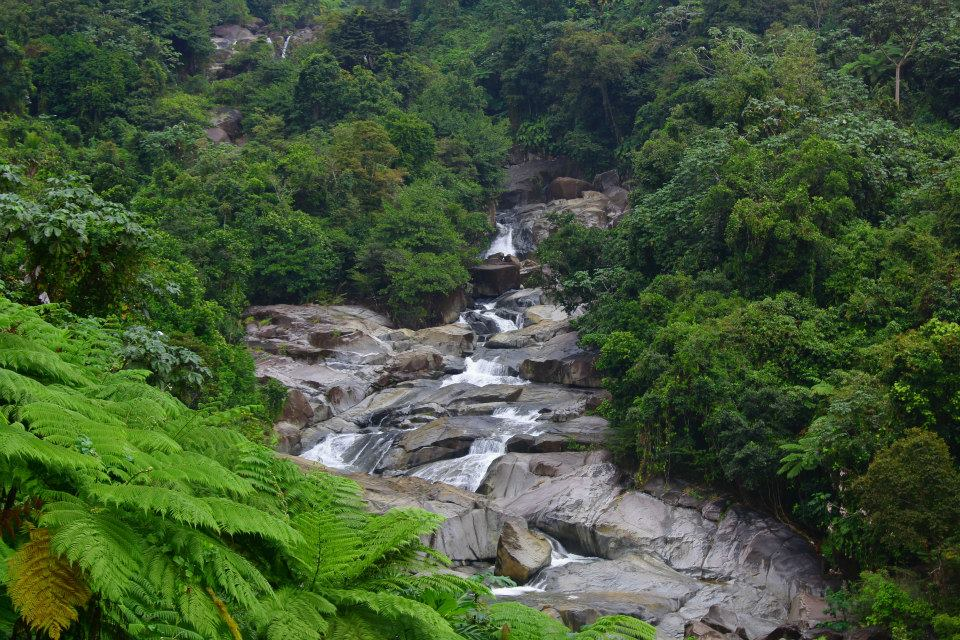

== See also ==
- El Toro Wilderness
- Luquillo Experimental Forest
- Puerto Rican moist forests – ecoregion
- List of national forests of the United States
