= Yokahu =

Yokahu is a variation of the name Yúcahu, the masculine spirit of fertility in Taíno mythology.

It may also refer to:

- Yokahu Lodge, an Order of the Arrow lodge of Scouting America's Puerto Rico Council
- Yokahú Tower, an observation tower within El Yunque National Forest in the island of Puerto Rico
