= Laurel magnolia =

Laurel magnolia is a common name for several plants and may refer to:

- Magnolia grandiflora, native to the southeastern United States
- Magnolia splendens, native to Puerto Rico
- Magnolia virginiana, native to the southeastern United States
