= Baño de Oro =

- U.S. National Register of Historic Places
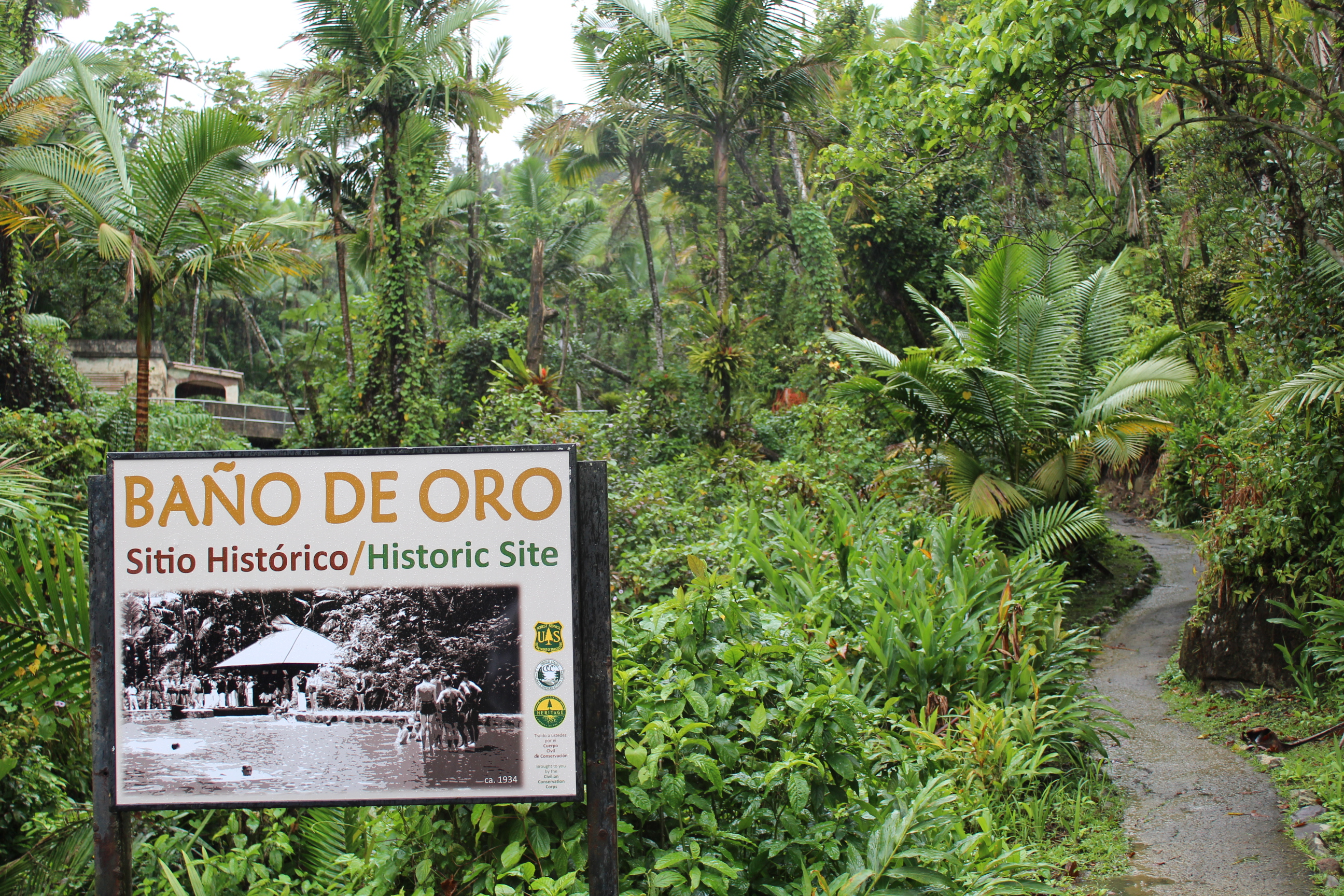
- Baño de Oro Historic Site

- Location within Puerto Rico
- Location: Road 191 km 11.9 Río Grande, Puerto Rico
- Coordinates: 18.30046°N 65.78657°W
- Built: 1934
- Architect: H. Randolph, Civilian Conservation Corps
- Architectural style: Moderne Spanish Revival Craftsman style
- NRHP reference No.: 100004891

The Baño de Oro Historic Site (Spanish for golden bath) is a historic recreation center and swimming pool located in the Baño de Oro area of El Yunque National Forest in Río Grande, Puerto Rico. The site of Baño de Oro gets its name from the Baño de Oro Creek, which itself is named after the former Spanish gold panning sites in the area. The wider Baño de Oro Natural Area where the historic site is found was named a National Natural Landmark in 1980 and it is the only contiguous area in Puerto Rico that contains a subtropical wet forest, a rainforest, a dwarf forest, and a Pterocarpus forest.

== La Piscina Pequeña ==
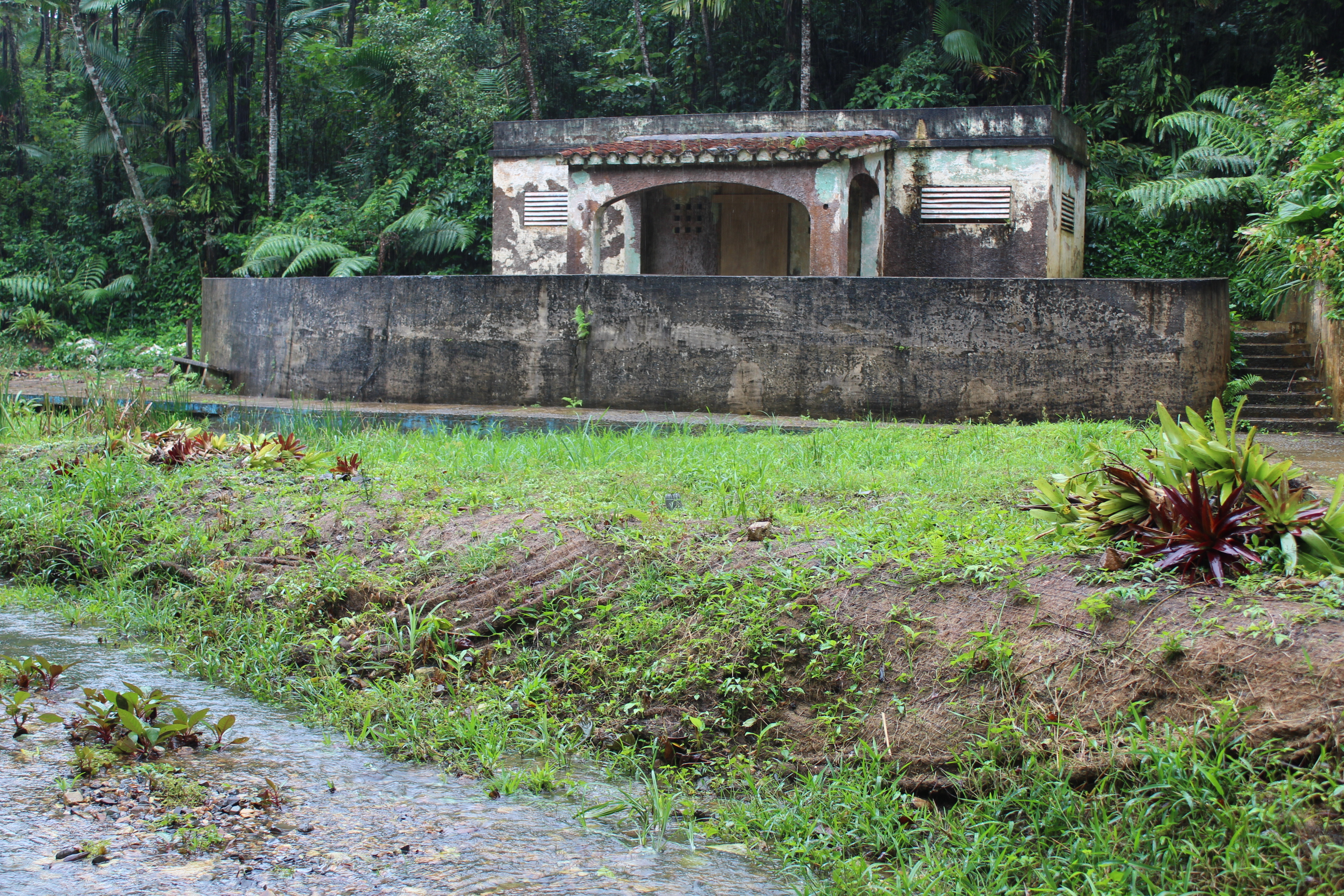
Abandoned rec center and pool

Baño de Oro, also known as La Piscina Pequeña (the small pool), is the smaller of the two historic swimming pools located in El Yunque, the other being the Baño Grande located nearby. Although no longer in use or operational, Baño de Oro is preserved as a historic site, and it was listed in the National Register of Historic Places on January 27, 2020, due to its importance as one of the New Deal Era Constructions in the Forest Reserves in Puerto Rico (1933–1942).

The Baño de Oro swimming pool was the first recreation site built in El Yunque National Forest, then known as the Luquillo Forest Reserve (until 1935 when the national forest was proclaimed as the Caribbean National Forest). It was built by the Civilian Conservation Corps using stone masonry and it was refurbished later with reinforced concrete. The pool was operational from 1934 until the latter half of the 1960s when it was closed due to safety reasons. It remained closed and abandoned until 2019 when the ruined recreational area was revitalized as a watershed garden.

== Gallery ==
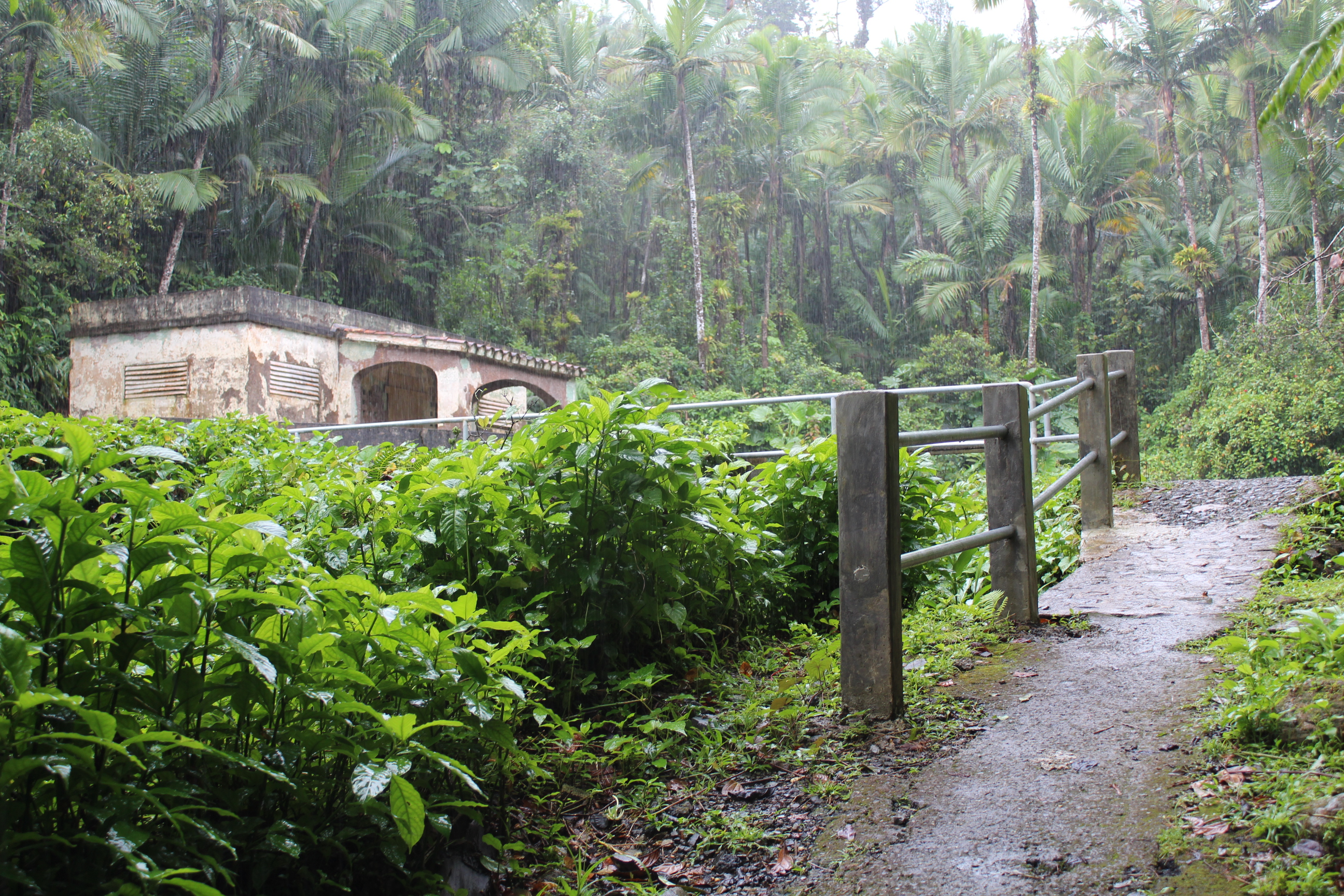
Trail in the Baño de Oro site

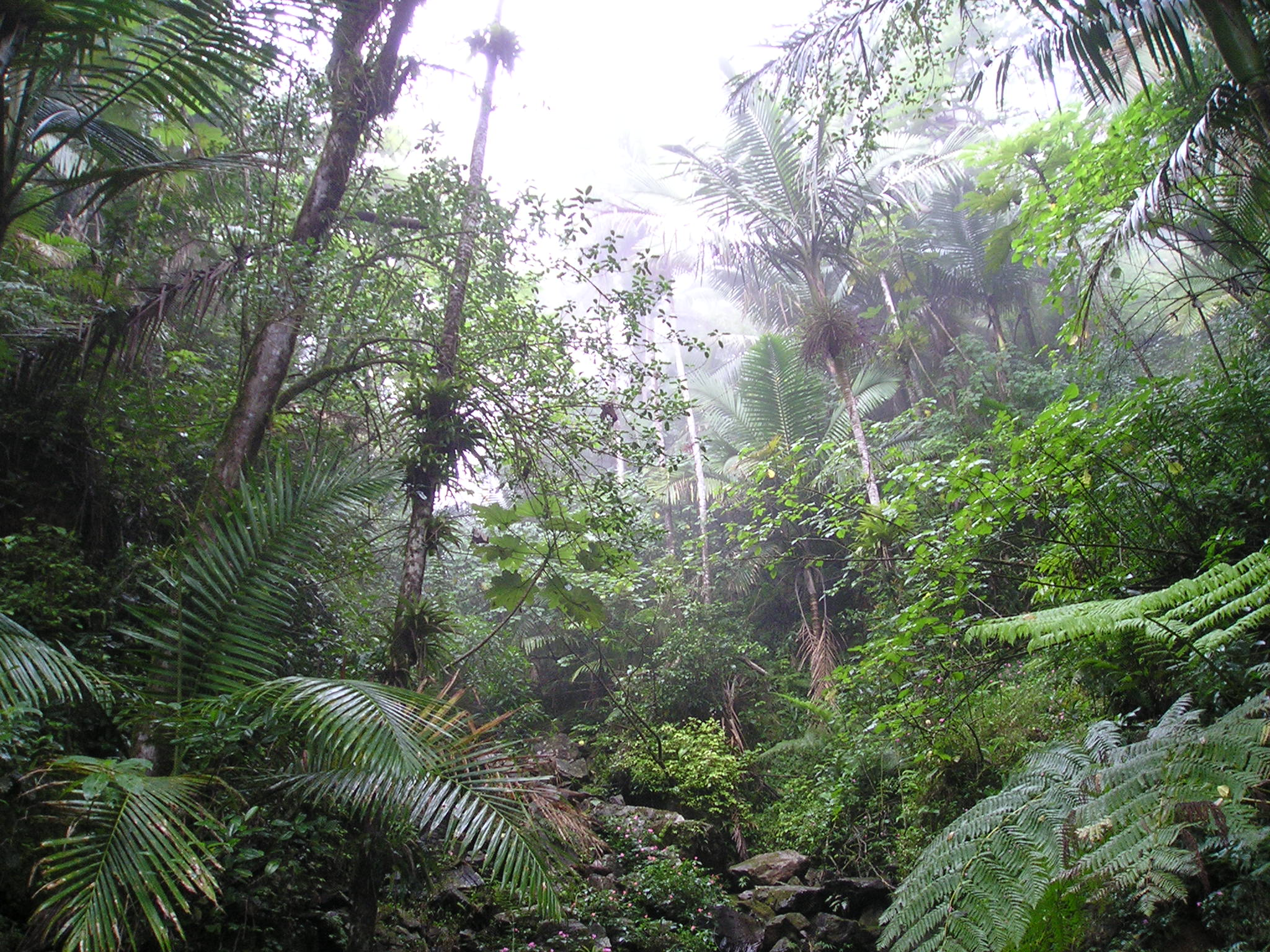
Endemic vegetation in the Baño de Oro Natural Area

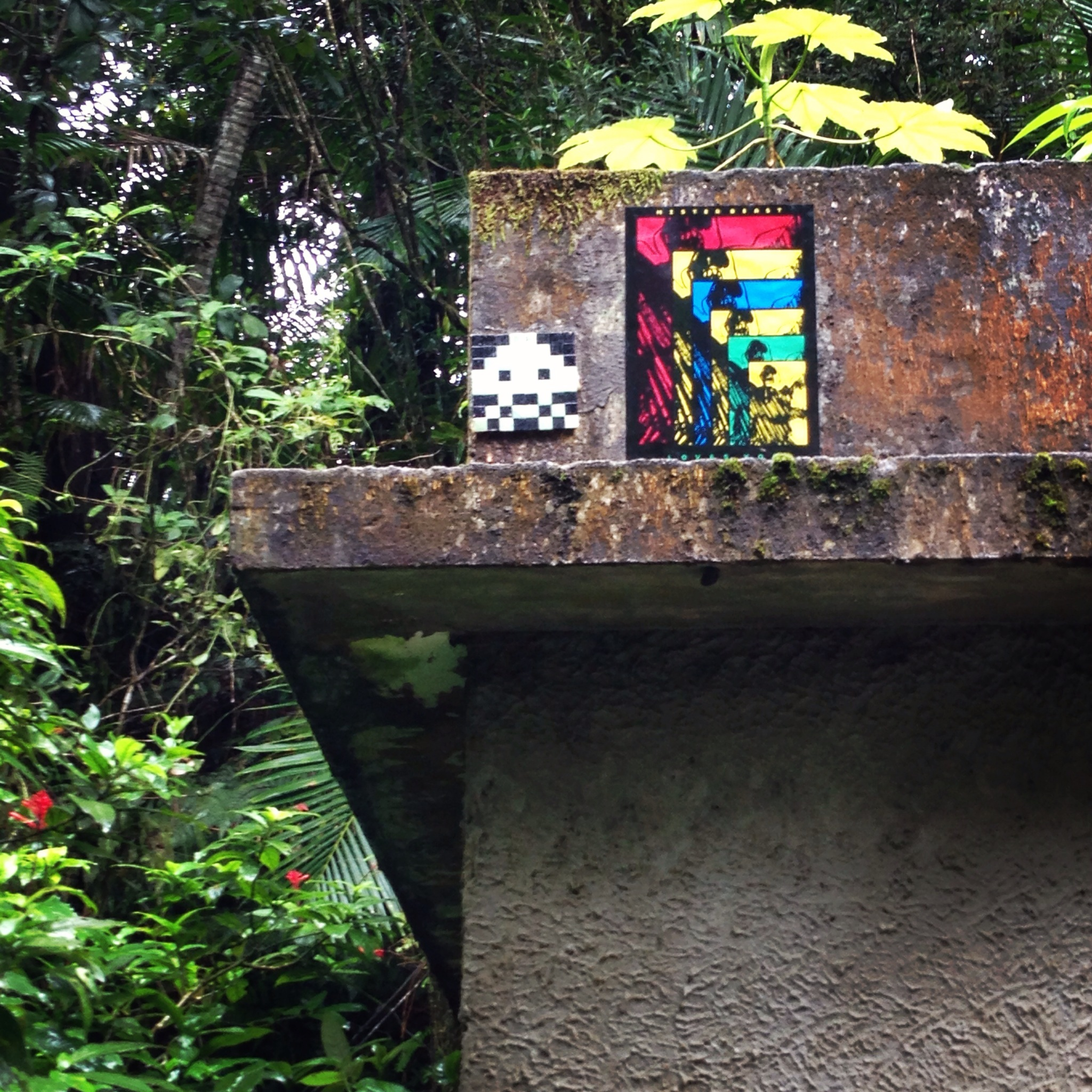
Invader-like urban art
