= Mameyes River =

River of Puerto Rico

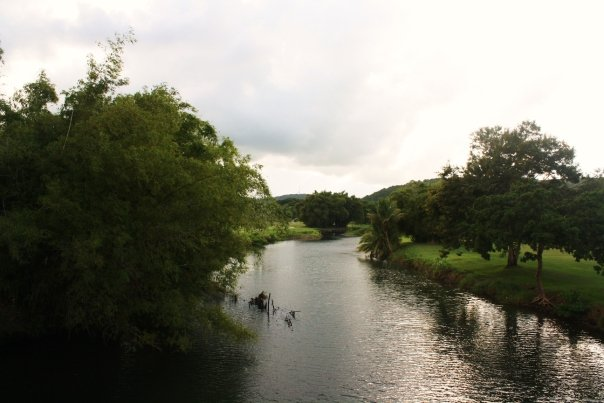
- Mameyes River in Río Grande

- Location within Puerto Rico
- Native name: Río Mameyes (Spanish)

Location
- Commonwealth: Puerto Rico
- Municipality: Luquillo

Physical characteristics
- Mouth
  - coordinates: 18.3852276°N 65.7498851°W

National Wild and Scenic River
- Type: Wild, Scenic, Recreational
- Designated: December 19, 2002

The Mameyes River (Spanish: Río Mameyes) is a river of Luquillo, Puerto Rico, and is also in Río Grande, Puerto Rico. It received the National Wild and Scenic River designation in 2002 and its riparian zone is 73 acres.

== See also ==
- List of rivers of Puerto Rico
