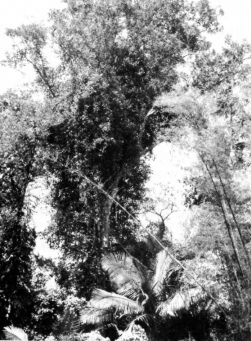
- Tabonuco tree (Dacryodes excelsa)

Scientific classification
- Kingdom: Plantae
- Clade: Tracheophytes
- Clade: Angiosperms
- Clade: Eudicots
- Clade: Rosids
- Order: Sapindales
- Family: Burseraceae
- Genus: Dacryodes
- Species: D. excelsa

Binomial name
- Dacryodes excelsa Vahl

= Dacryodes excelsa =

Species of tree

Dacryodes excelsa is a tree native to Puerto Rico, with a habitat that extends into the Lesser Antilles in the Caribbean region. Its English vernacular names include gommier and candlewood. Its Spanish common name is tabonuco.

== Description ==
Dacryodes excelsa is distinguished by wide, low buttresses, a columnar trunk, smooth gray bark, and pinnate leaves composed of five to seven fragrant, dark-green leaflets. When wounded, the tree exudes a flammable, fragrant, and transparent resin that hardens and turns white upon exposure. The tree can grow to around 115 feet (35 m) and 71 in (180 cm) in diameter. It grows best in soil with a PH of 4.5–5.5.

These large trees tend to be concentrated on upper slopes and ridges, where they can form groups with roots are grafted together, thus forming a unified group of trees that provides them with superior anchorage against hurricane-force winds. In Puerto Rico, the trees are native to elevations of 660–2,800 feet (200–900 m).

In Puerto Rico, the tree is found in the Luquillo mountains, as well as in Toro Negro State Forest in Puerto Rico's Cordillera Central. Many of these trees are estimated to be upwards of 400 years in age. In Dominica, the tree is found in Morne Trois Pitons National Park and along the Syndicate Nature Trail. In Guadeloupe, the tree is found in Basse-Terre Nord.

== Uses ==
Wood from the Dacryodes excelsa can be used for furniture, cabinetry, and general construction, as well as for constructing fishing vessels. In Puerto Rico, the island's first inhabitants used resin from the tree to make candles and torches, to caulk boats, as incense, and for medicinal purposes. The Puerto Rican parrot, an endangered species, feeds on the tree's seeds. In Dominica, the Kalinago historically used wood from the tree to build dugout canoes, and a tradition that continues today. In Guadeloupe, the island's indigenous people also used these trees to build their canoes (kanawa).
