= Yokahú Tower =

Observation tower within El Yunque National Forest in Puerto Rico

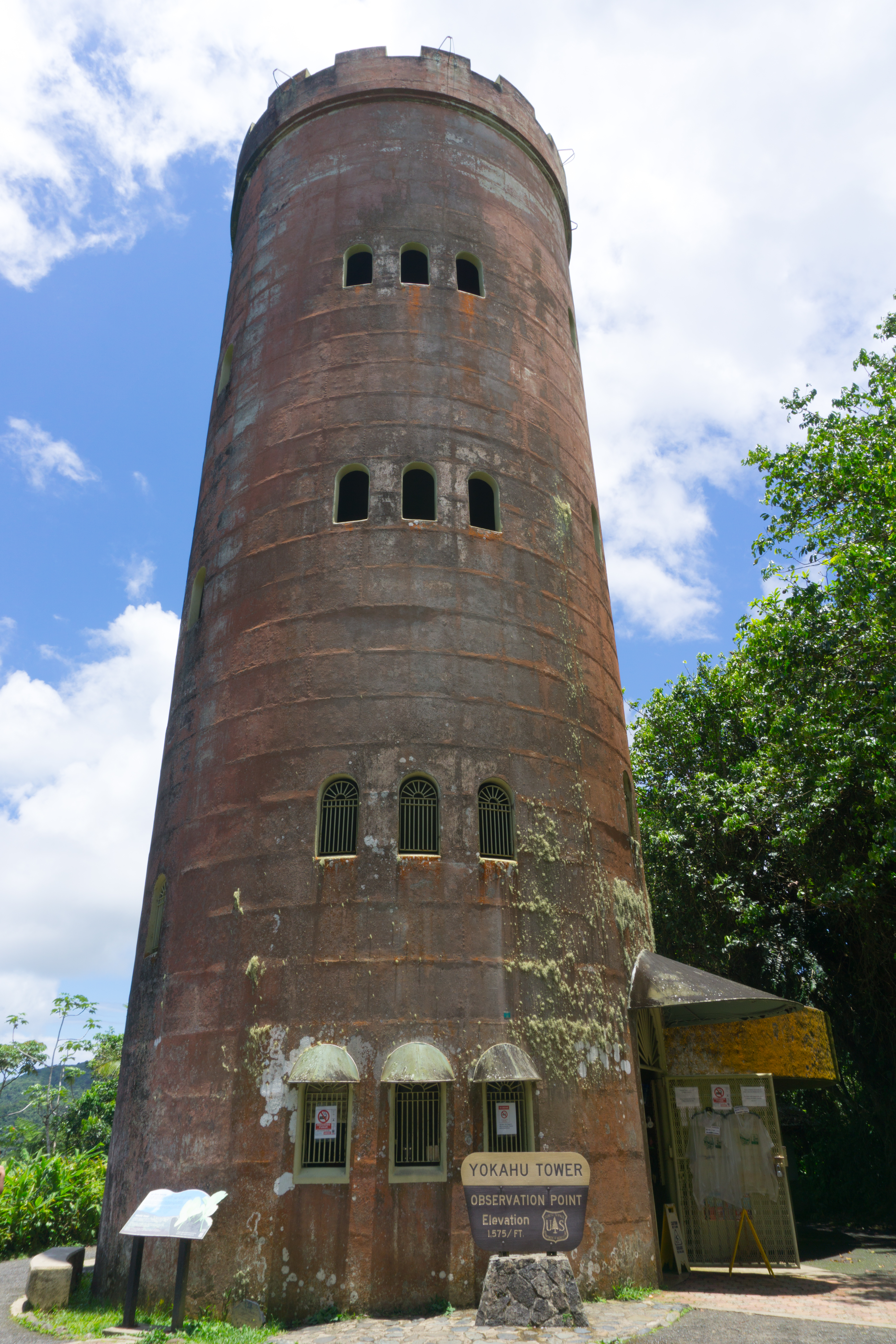
- Interactive map of the Yokahú Tower area

General information
- Type: Observation tower
- Location: Puerto Rico
- Coordinates: 18.312512°N 65.770238°W
- Completed: 1963

Yokahú Tower is an observation tower within El Yunque National Forest on the island of Puerto Rico.

== Background ==
Constructed in 1963, the tower was built by Forest Supervisor and Director of IITF, Frank H. Wadsworth. The tower is one of the two observation towers located in the park and sits at an elevation of 1,575 feet (480 m). The tower is 69 feet (21 meters) tall, and overlooks the El Yunque National Forest.

The other tower in the El Yunque is the Mount Britton Tower. It is located at a higher elevation and usually has cloud cover that interferes with the views. Yokahu is widely considered the better of the two with regard to the view offered. When it comes to convenience, Yokahú Tower again has an advantage over the Mount Britton Tower. Yokahú Tower has a parking lot nearby whereas the Mount Britton is in the middle of the forest.

== Gallery ==
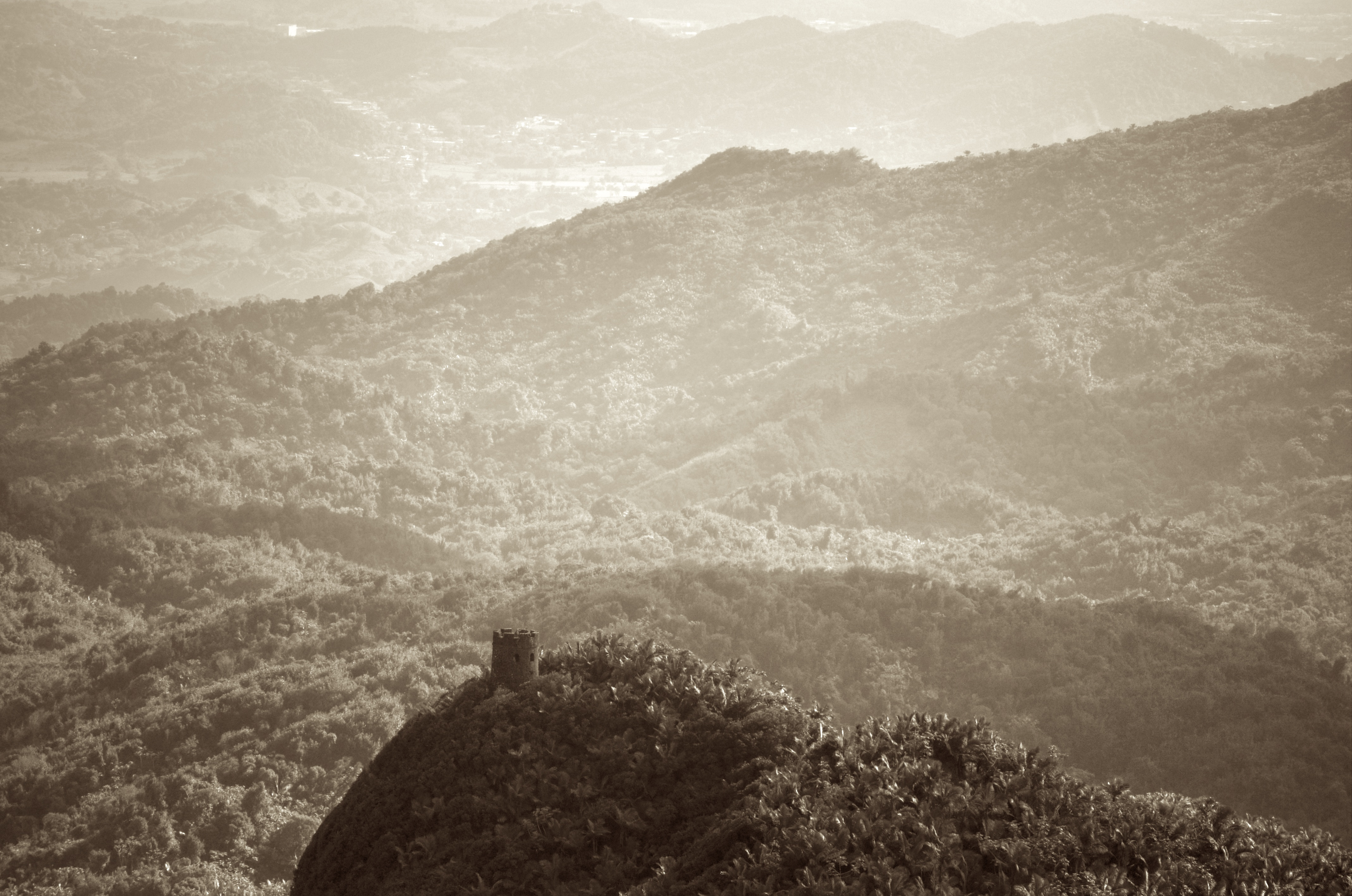
El Yunque Rain Forest and tower as seen from Mameyes II

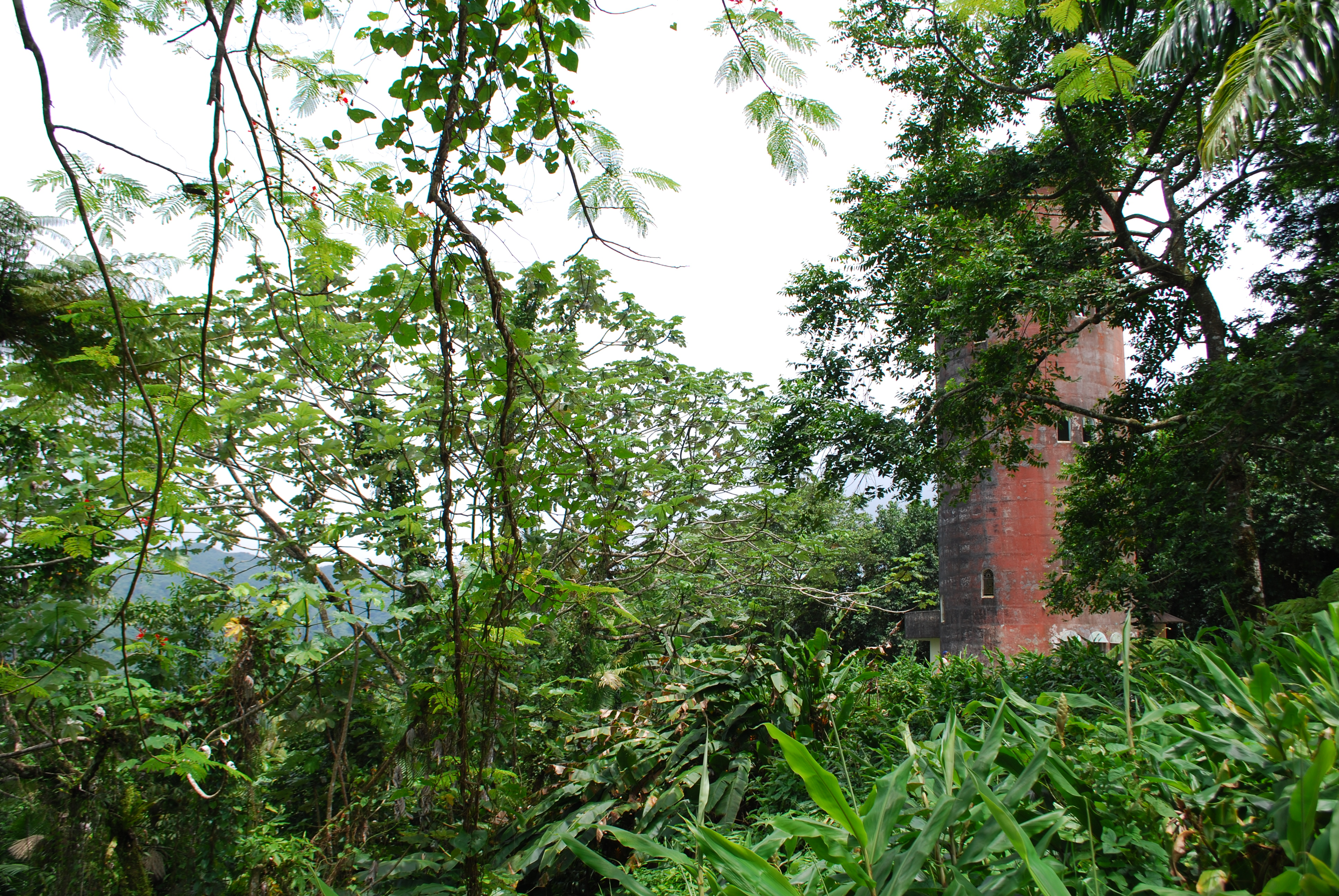
Yokahú Tower in the El Yunque Rainforest

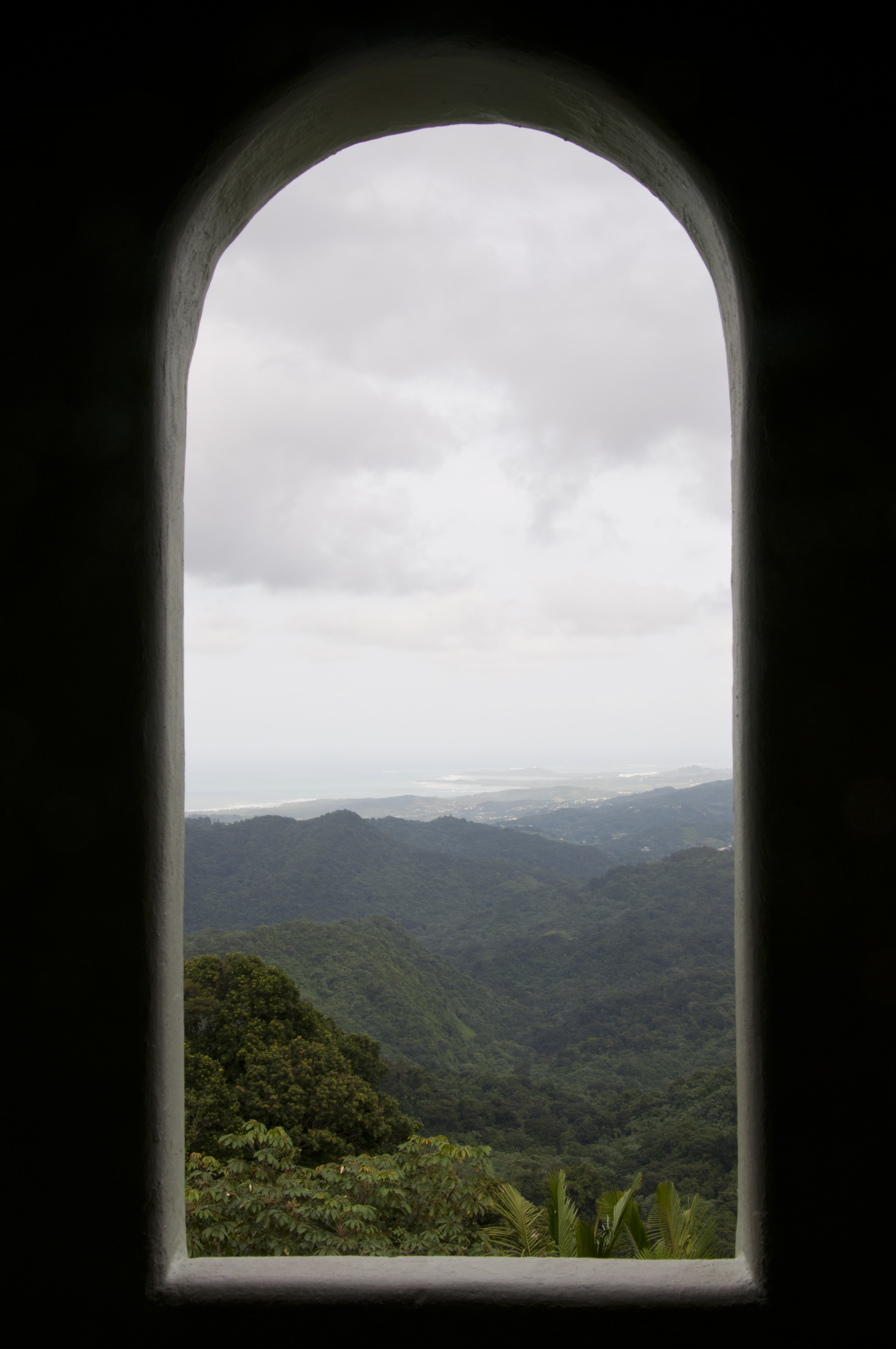
View from window at Yokahú Tower

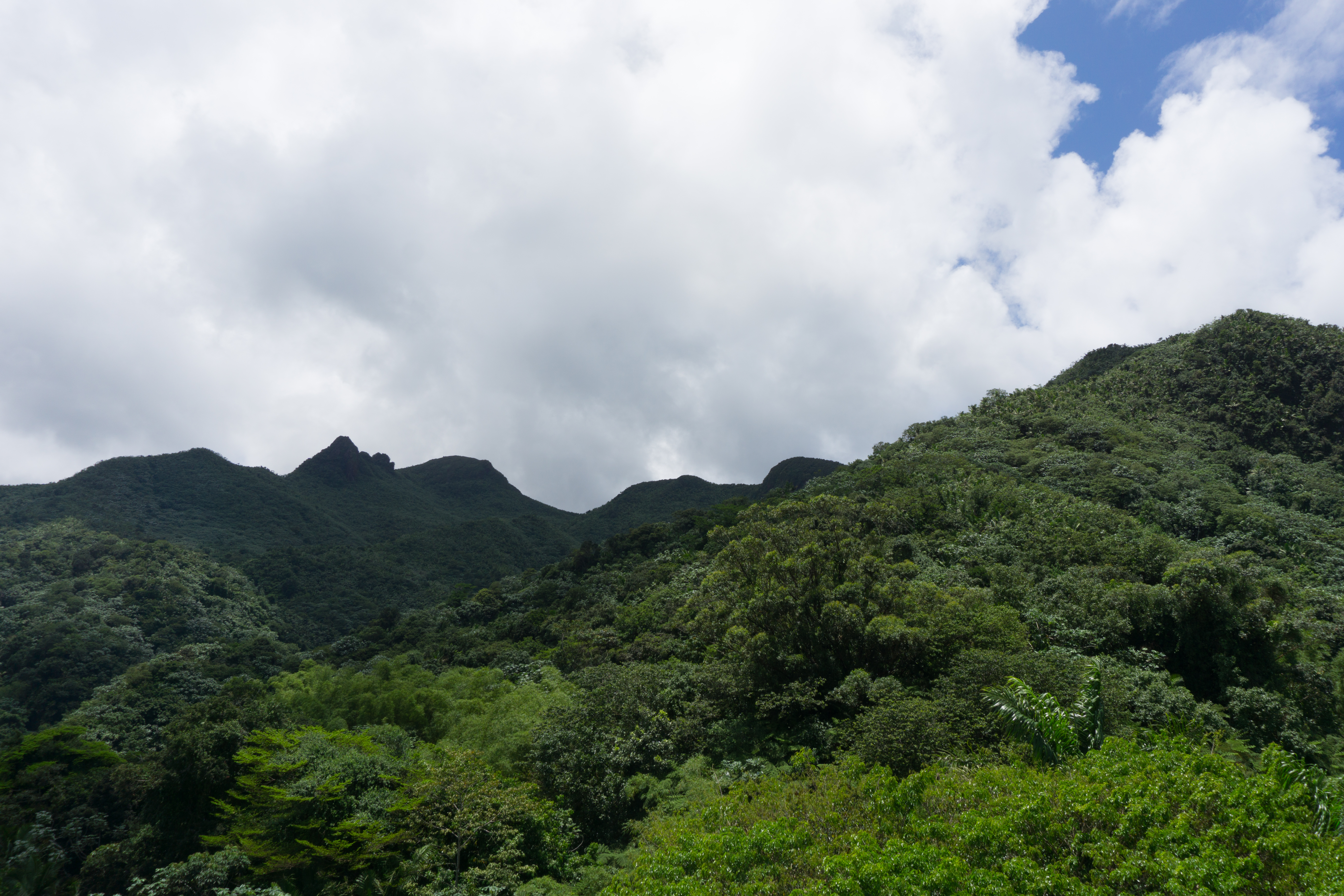
View from Yokahú observation tower

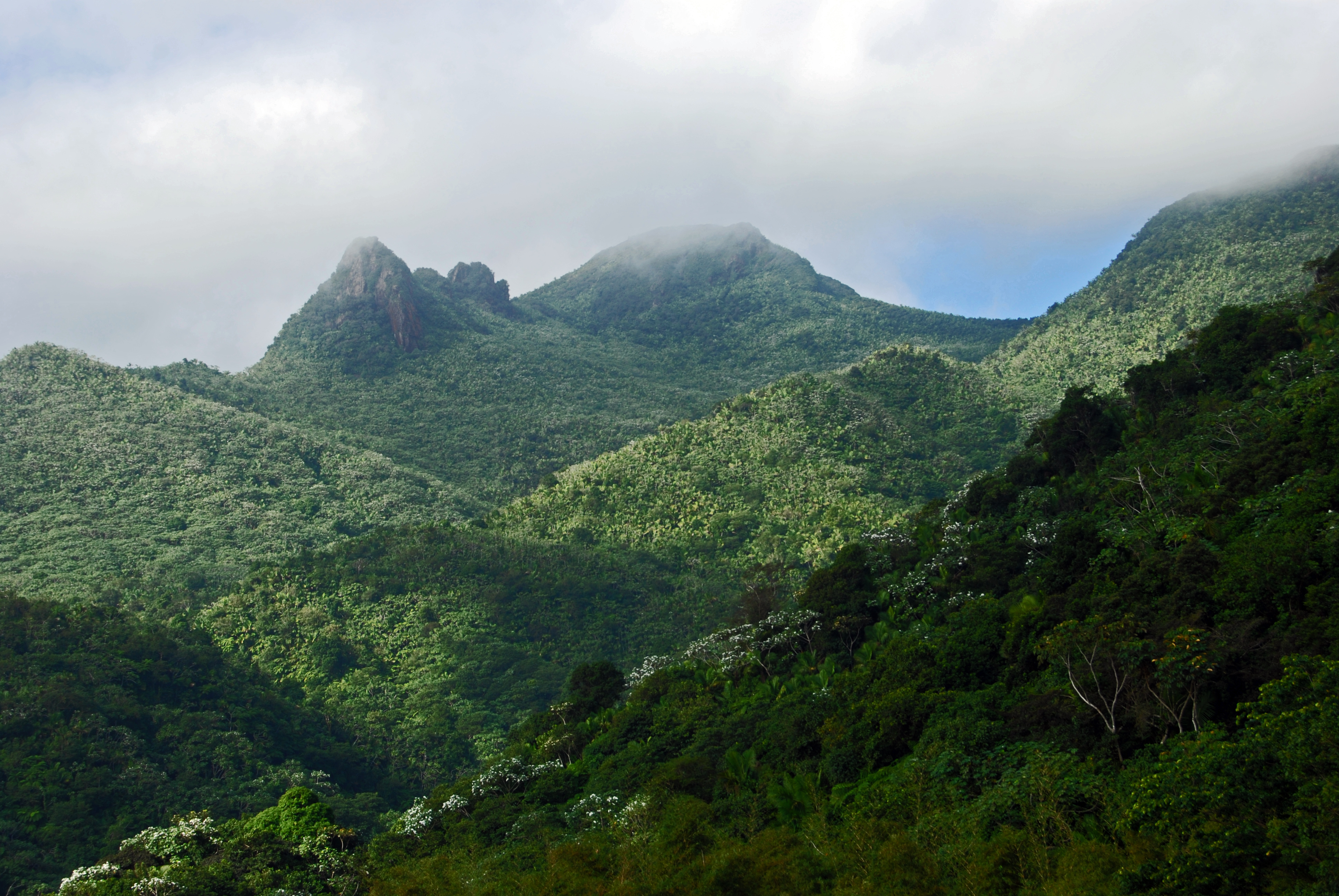
View from Yokahú observation tower

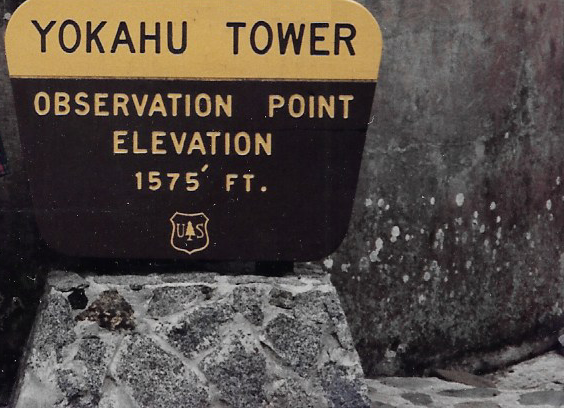
Yokahu Tower Observation Point Elevation 1575 feet sign

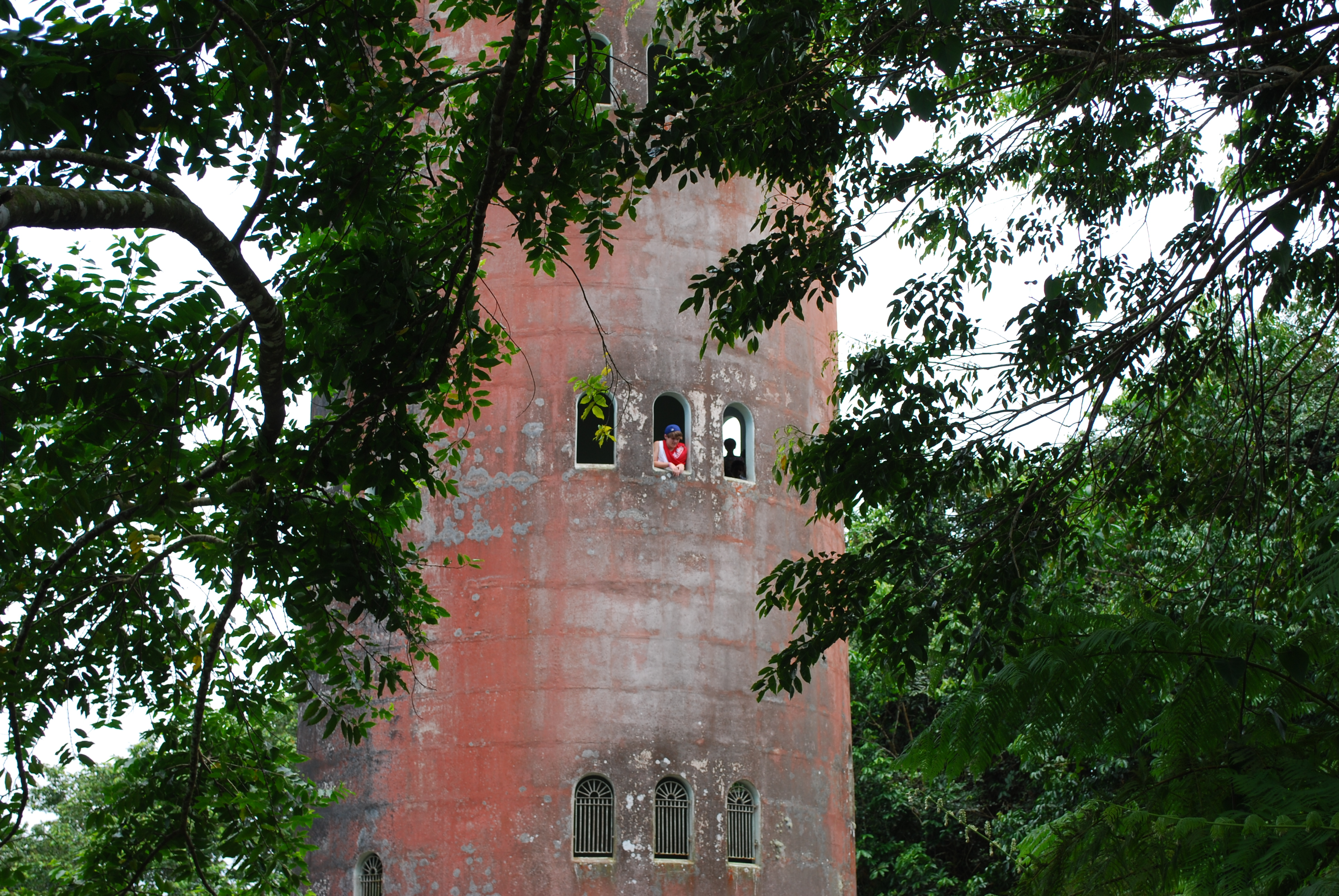
Visitors inside the tower

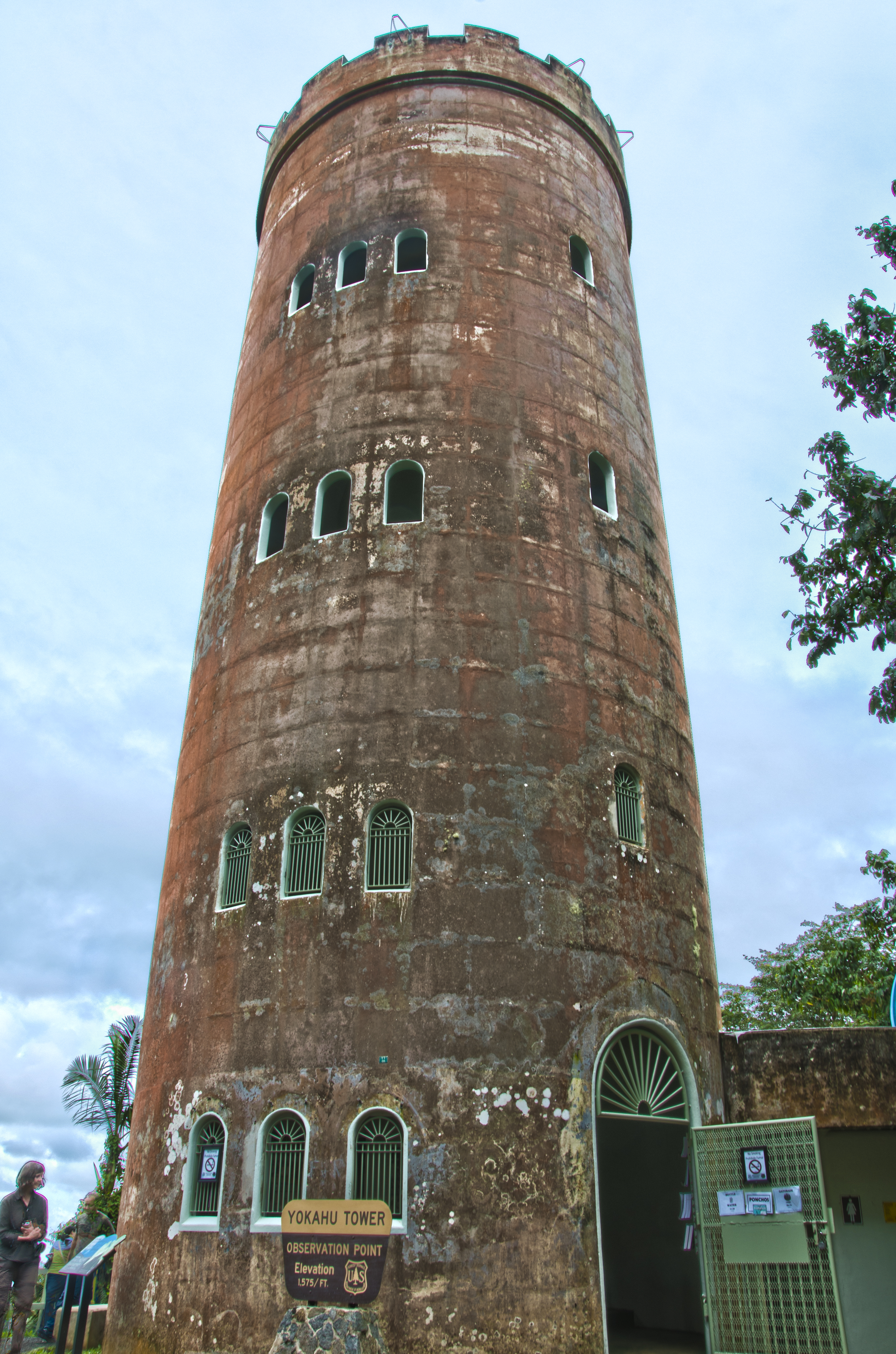
Yokahú Tower at El Yunque National Forest

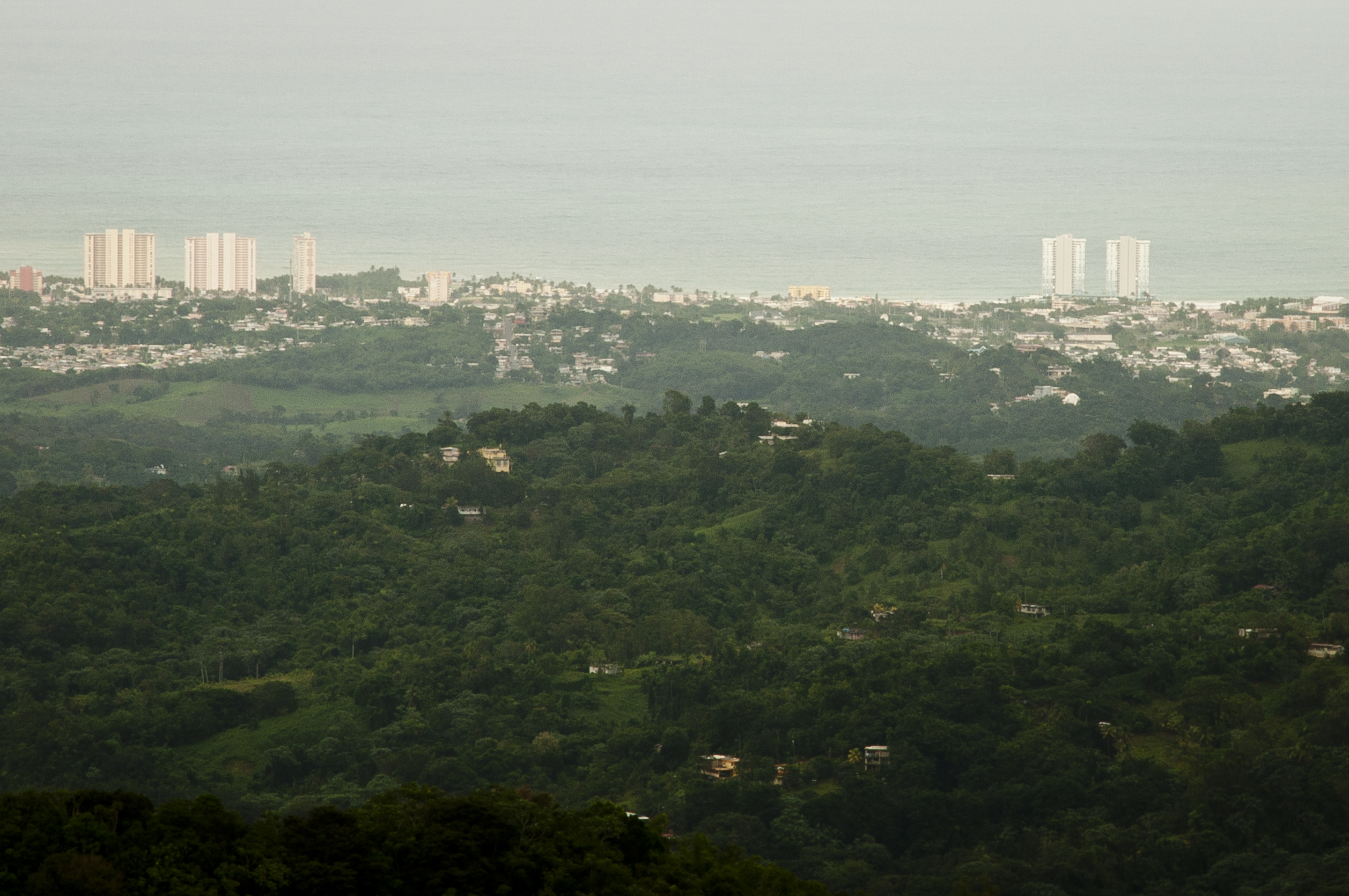
View from tower
