= Magnolia splendens =

Laurel magnolia

Conservation status
- Endangered (IUCN 3.1)

Scientific classification
- Kingdom: Plantae
- Clade: Embryophytes
- Clade: Tracheophytes
- Clade: Spermatophytes
- Clade: Angiosperms
- Clade: Magnoliids
- Order: Magnoliales
- Family: Magnoliaceae
- Genus: Magnolia
- Section: Magnolia sect. Talauma
- Subsection: Magnolia subsect. Cubenses
- Species: M. splendens

Binomial name
- Magnolia splendens Urb.

Synonyms
- Dugandiodendron splendens (Urb.) Sima & S.G.Lu; Talauma mutabilis var. splendens (Urb.) Urb. ex McLaughlin; Talauma splendens (Urb.) McLaughlin

Species of plant

Magnolia splendens, commonly known as the laurel magnolia, shining magnolia, or locally as the laurel sabino, is a magnolia native to eastern Puerto Rico. It is a medium to large evergreen tree 16–80 ft (4.9–24.4 m) tall with dark green leaves and showy cream or white flowers. The wood is aromatic, giving its common epithet of 'laurel'. It was described by German botanist Ignatz Urban in 1899.
