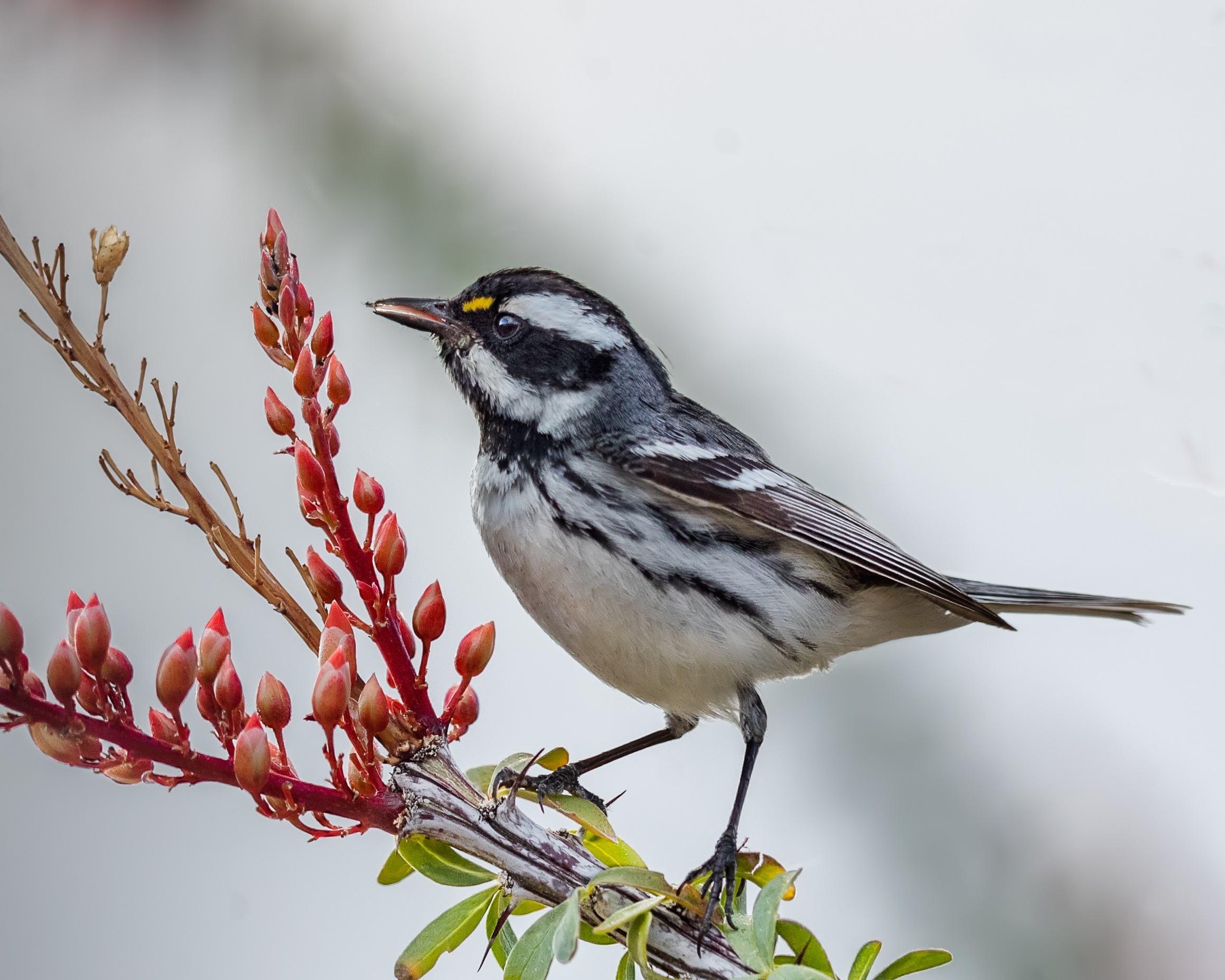

Conservation status
- Least Concern (IUCN 3.1)

Scientific classification
- Kingdom: Animalia
- Phylum: Chordata
- Class: Aves
- Order: Passeriformes
- Family: Parulidae
- Genus: Setophaga
- Species: S. nigrescens

Binomial name
- Setophaga nigrescens (Townsend, 1837)
- Breeding range Winter range

Synonyms
- Sylvia nigrescens Townsend, 1837; Vermivora nigrescens (Townsend, 1837) Bonaparte, 1838; Sylvicola nigrescens (Townsend, 1837) Audubon, 1839; Sylvia halseii Giraud, 1841; Mniotilta nigrescens (Townsend, 1837) Gray, 1848; Rhimanphus nigrescens (Townsend, 1837) Cabanis, 1850; Sylvicola nigricans Henry, 1855; Dendroica nigrescens (Townsend, 1837) Sclater, 1862

= Black-throated gray warbler =

Species of bird

The black-throated gray warbler or black-throated grey warbler (Setophaga nigrescens) is a passerine bird of the New World warbler family Parulidae. It is 13 cm (5.1 in) long and has gray and white plumage with black markings. The male has the bold black throat of its name, and black stripes on its head, as well as black streaks on its flanks; the female is a paler version of the male, with a white throat and less distinct black markings on the flanks and wings. It breeds in western North America from British Columbia to New Mexico, and winters in Mexico and the southwestern United States. The habitats it prefers are coniferous and mixed forests and scrubland, especially those with pinyon pines, junipers, sagebrush, and oaks. Its nest is an open cup of plant fibers lined with feathers, built a few metres from the ground in the branches of a tree or shrub. Three to five eggs are laid, and young are fed by both parents. Common in its breeding range, it does not seem to be seriously threatened by human activities, unlike many migratory warblers.

== Taxonomy ==
The black-throated gray warbler was first described by John Kirk Townsend in 1837 from a specimen collected near today's Portland, Oregon. It was known to the Chinook inhabitants of the northwest coast, who called it Ah Kah a qual. Townsend described the species as Sylvia nigrescens, placing it with the other New World warblers and the unrelated Old World warblers in the genus Sylvia. It is now placed in the genus Setophaga along with about thirty other species, after having been classified in Dendroica for some time. Within its genus, it is part of a group with black throats and yellow face markings that includes the hermit warbler and Townsend's warbler. It is usually considered an early offshoot among this group of species, but genetic studies suggest a close relation to Grace's warbler.

Of these relatives, the range of the black-throated gray warbler overlaps with those of Townsend's warbler and the hermit warbler, but they occur in different habitats. While Townsend's and hermit warblers commonly hybridize with each other, records of either species hybridizing with the black-throated gray warbler are uncommon.

There are two subspecies, which are highly similar and of dubious validity. The nominate subspecies S. n. nigrescens occurs on the Pacific coastal region from British Columbia to northern California, while S. n. halseii, described by Giraud in 1841, occupies the inland parts of its range. S. n. halseii birds are slightly larger and more gray in their upperparts.

== Description ==
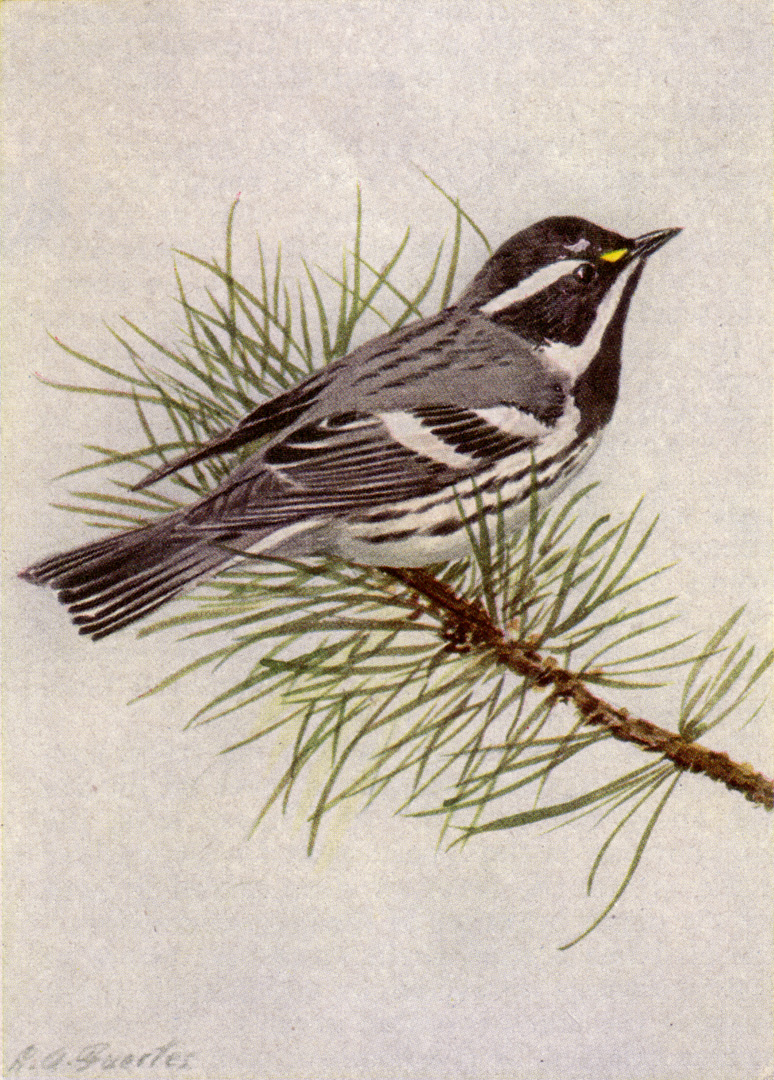
An illustration of a male

The black-throated gray warbler has mostly black, gray, and white plumage, which is soft, lacking gloss. With its striping and the small yellow spot between its eye and bill, it is a distinctive bird. The sexes differ slightly, both having gray upperparts with black streaks, and white underparts with black streaks on the flanks. The adult male is striped with black on the crown, throat, and below the eye, and has white around its chin and above its eye. The adult female has more dingy plumage on its head, with a white throat and dark gray cheeks. The most similar birds to the black-throated gray warbler are the black-and-white and blackpoll warblers, which although marked in black have entirely different plumage patterns.

It is typically 13 cm (5.1 in) long, weighing 8.4 g (0.30 oz). Wing lengths are 5.6–6.9 cm (2.2–2.7 in), tail lengths 4.7–5.5 cm (1.9–2.2 in), bill lengths 8.4–9.6 mm (0.33–0.38 in), and tarsus lengths 1.66–1.88 cm (0.65–0.74 in), with females slightly smaller than males. Wingspan ranges from 7.5–7.8 in (19–19.7 cm).

This bird gives a sharp tup or thick call, like that of Townsend's warbler but flat and unmusical, as well as a high see flight call. The male's song is a series of buzzy notes, with the earlier notes doubled and the next to last note high. This song has three variations, including a quiet "soft song" given by the males while following females gathering material for a nest.

== Distribution and habitat ==
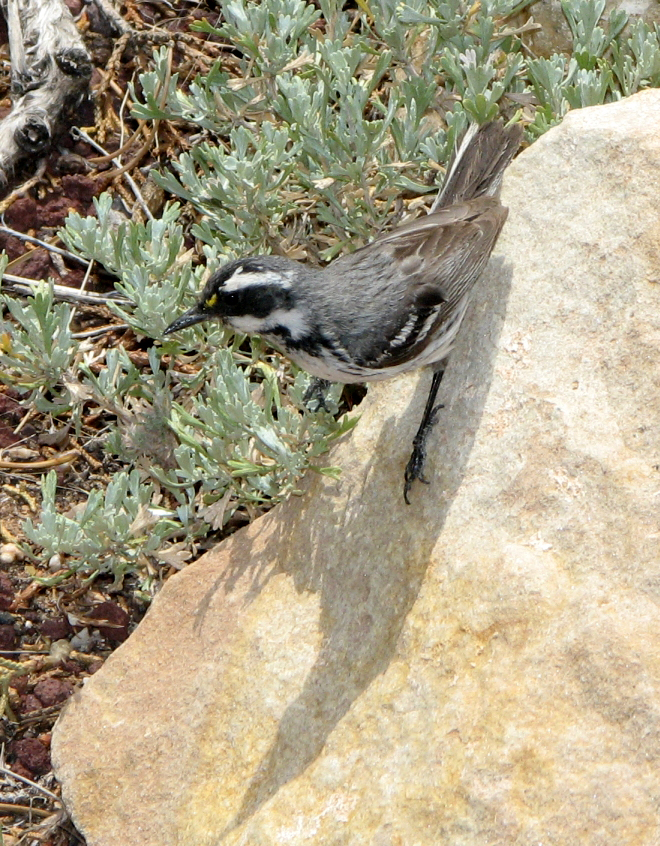
Second-year female

The black-throated gray warbler breeds in western North America, its range extending from southwestern British Columbia along the Pacific coast to northern Baja California, and east to New Mexico and southern Montana. It winters mostly in Mexico, from southern Baja California to Oaxaca state. It has spread into parts of Wyoming and Montana only recently, as Juniperus osteosperma has expanded its range due to a warming climate. Vagrants have been recorded across eastern North America and in Cuba.

The black-throated gray warbler breeds in open coniferous and mixed forest with a brushy understory, in dry open oak forests, and in chaparral and other scrubland. It is particularly associated with pinyon pines, junipers, and oaks. It migrates to the south late in the fall, returning north in mid-spring. While migrating, it forages in any woodland or scrub it passes through. In its wintering grounds, it occurs in dry woodland and tall scrub. Though its status is not well known, it does not appear to be seriously threatened by habitat destruction or other human activities, unlike many migratory warblers. It is a fairly common bird, among the most common in some localities. Because it is common and not in rapid decline, it is assessed as Least Concern on the IUCN Red List.

== Behavior ==
The black-throated gray warbler is usually approachable, and can easily be observed while foraging. Despite this, it is poorly known, especially in its breeding behavior, of which Birds of North America said "almost no information is available". It forages, often in flocks with other species. It feeds on insects gleaned on low branches, especially caterpillars.

The nest is usually placed on a horizontal tree branch or in a shrub, a few metres above the ground. The nest is an open cup constructed of grass stalks and other fibres, and lined with feathers and hair. The female lays three to five pinkish eggs with brown dots from May to July. Incubation and fledging periods are unknown. This species has been recorded giving a distraction display, pretending to be injured to distract predators from its nest. Both parents feed the young, though the female may do so more frequently.
