= Baypoll warbler =

Baypoll warbler is a nickname given to two birds with similar appearances:

- Bay-breasted warbler
- Blackpoll warbler
