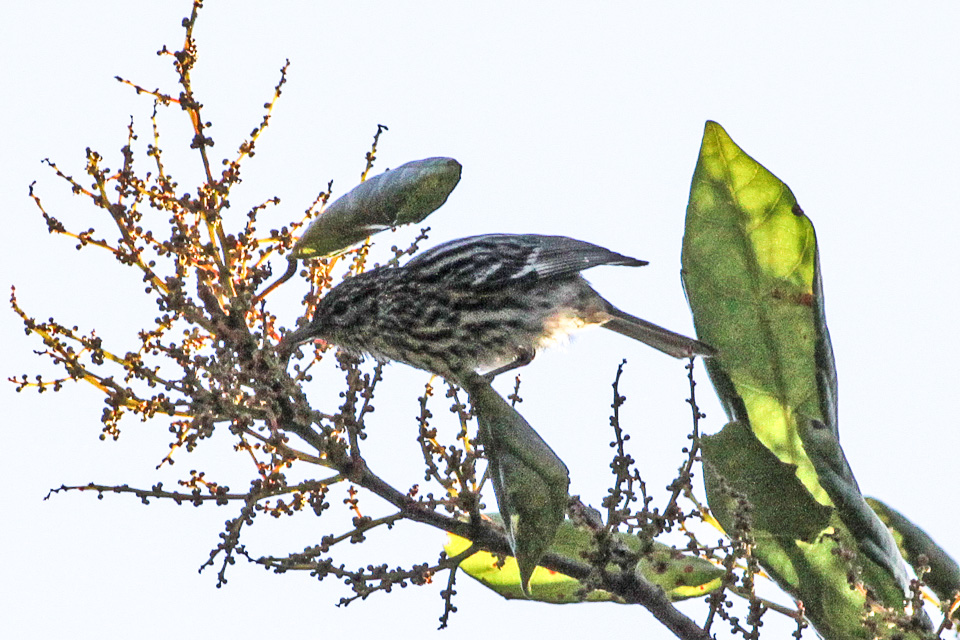

Conservation status
- Least Concern (IUCN 3.1)

Scientific classification
- Kingdom: Animalia
- Phylum: Chordata
- Class: Aves
- Order: Passeriformes
- Family: Parulidae
- Genus: Setophaga
- Species: S. pharetra

Binomial name
- Setophaga pharetra (Gosse, 1847)

Synonyms
- See text

= Arrowhead warbler =

Species of bird

The arrowhead warbler (Setophaga pharetra) is a species of passerine bird in the family Parulidae, the New World warblers. It is endemic to Jamaica.

== Taxonomy and systematics ==
The arrowhead warbler was formally described by the English naturalist Philip Henry Gosse in 1847 as Sylvicola pharetra, with its type locality given as Bluefields Peak. It was later reassigned to genus Dendroica, and beginning in 2011 taxonomic systems reassigned it to its present genus Setophaga. The arrowhead warbler forms a superspecies with the elfin woods warbler (S. angelae) of Puerto Rico and the plumbeous warbler (S. plumbea) of Guadeloupe and Dominica.

The arrowhead warbler is monotypic.

== Etymology ==
The arrowhead warbler's genus Setophaga means "moth eater" in Greek. The specific epithet pharetra is Latin and means "quiver" as in a carrier for arrows.

== Description ==
The arrowhead warbler is 12.5 to 13 cm (4.9 to 5.1 in) long and weighs 9.1 to 10.5 g (0.32 to 0.37 oz). The sexes have almost the same plumage. Adult males have a black and white streaked head and upperparts. The upper side of their wings is darker and the greater and median coverts have white tips that show as two wing bars. Their tail is mostly dark above with a whitish underside and white spots at the tips of the outer two pairs of feathers. Their underparts are mostly whitish with the eponymous black arrowheads on the throat, breast, and flanks. Adult females are slightly duller than males, and at least one source states that their streaks are gray rather than black. Both sexes have a dark iris, a blackish bill, and blackish brown legs and feet. Immature birds have brownish yellow upperparts with faint yellowish buff streaks. Their wings and tail are darker than adults', and their underparts are pale brownish yellow with faint darker streaks.

== Distribution and habitat ==
The arrowhead warbler is endemic to Jamaica. It inhabits humid montane forest and also humid lowland forest in the non-breeding season.

== Behavior ==
=== Movement ===
The arrowhead warbler is found year-round in montane forest and some individuals move to lower elevations in the non-breeding season.

=== Feeding ===
The arrowhead warbler feeds primarily on insects. It forages at all levels of the forest, gleaning prey from leaves, vines, and branches.

=== Breeding ===
The arrowhead warbler's breeding activity is concentrated between March and June but breeding has also been noted in November after autumn rains. The nest is a cup made from fine roots lined with moss and lichen. It is typically concealed in a bush, vine tangle, bromeliad, or tree. The clutch is two to four eggs. The incubation period, time to fledging, and details of parental care are not known.

=== Vocalization ===
The arrowhead warbler's song is "a series of high-pitched and squeaky notes...sww-sw-swee-sww-sw-swee-sww-sw-swee-swee-swee". Its call is a repeated "high-pitched, metallic tic".

== Status ==
The IUCN has assessed the arrowhead warbler as being of Least Concern. Its population size is not known but is believed to be stable. No immediate threats have been identified. It is considered locally common throughout its range.
