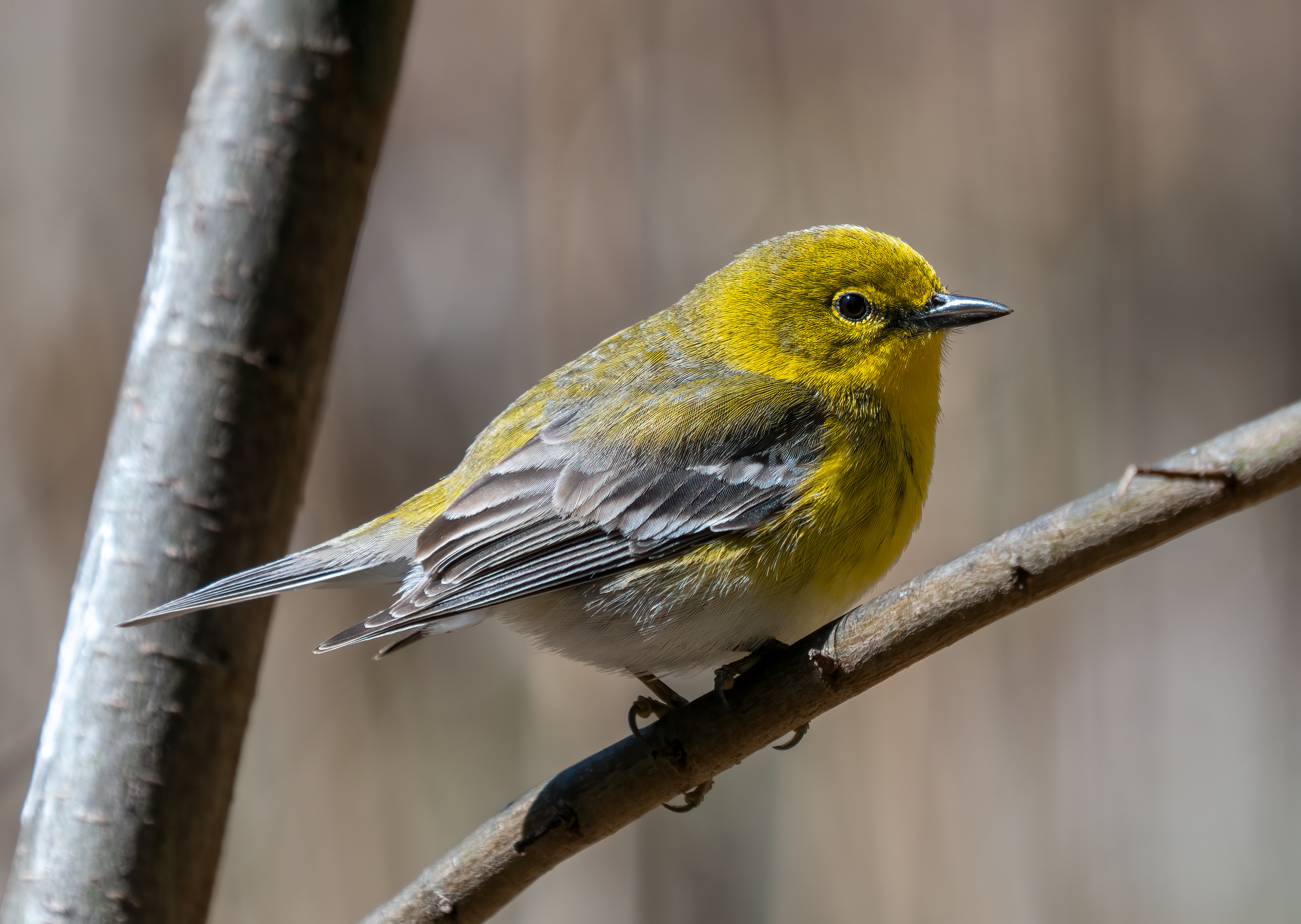
- Adult male
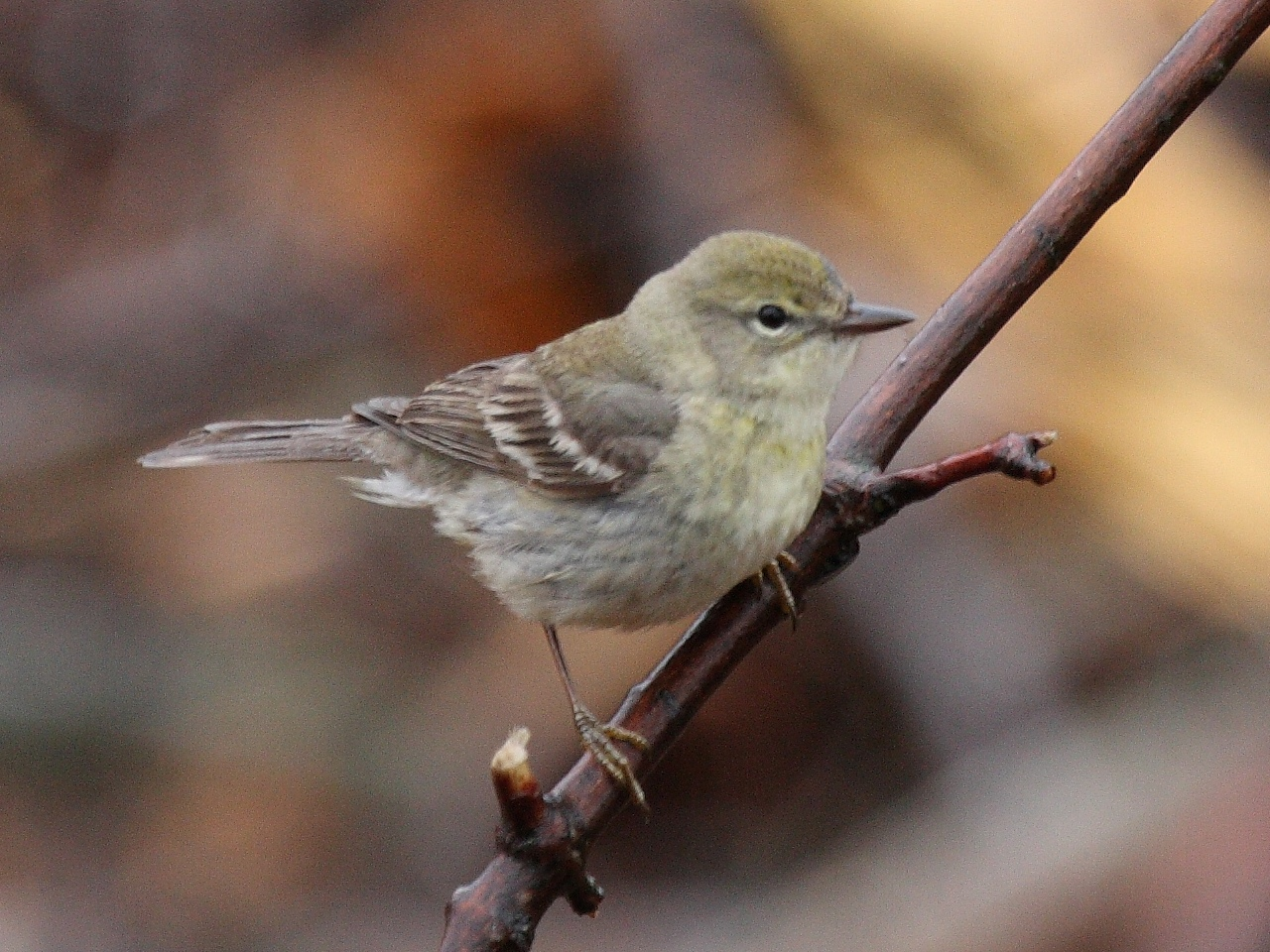
- Female

Conservation status
- Least Concern (IUCN 3.1)

Scientific classification
- Kingdom: Animalia
- Phylum: Chordata
- Class: Aves
- Order: Passeriformes
- Family: Parulidae
- Genus: Setophaga
- Species: S. pinus

Binomial name
- Setophaga pinus (Linnaeus, 1766)
- Range of S. pinus (note: missing range on Hispaniola) Breeding range Year-round range Wintering range

Synonyms
- Certhia pinus Linnaeus, 1766; Dendroica pinus (Linnaeus, 1766); Sylvia pinus Wilson, 1811; Dendroica vigorsii (Audubon, 1831); Sylvia pinus (Linnaeus, 1766); Sylvia vigorsii Audubon, 1831

= Pine warbler =

Species of bird

The pine warbler (Setophaga pinus) is a small songbird of the New World warbler family Parulidae. It is a permanent resident in the southeastern United States and also breeds in southeastern Canada and the northeastern United States, where it is migratory. Unlike other wood-warblers, in addition to insects the pine warbler also sometimes consumes seeds.

== Taxonomy ==
The pine warbler was formally described in 1766 by the Swedish naturalist Carl Linnaeus in the twelfth edition of his Systema Naturae under the binomial name Certhia pinus. Linnaeus based his entry on the "pine-creeper" that had been described and illustrated by the English naturalists Mark Catesby in 1731 and George Edwards in 1760. Edwards had doubts as to whether his specimen was the same species as illustrated by Catesby and included as a footnote "On a stricter examination I think it a species different from Catesby's". Edwards' etching actually depicted a blue-winged warbler so that Linnaeus's name applied to two different species. This led to considerable instability in the nomenclature which was only resolved when in 2009 a new binomial name, Vermivora cyanoptera, was proposed by Storrs L. Olson and James L. Reveal for the blue-winged warbler. The type location was restricted to the state of Georgia by the American Ornithologists' Union in 1931. The pine warbler is now one of over 30 species placed in the genus Setophaga that was introduced by the English naturalist William Swainson in 1827. The genus name Setophaga combines the Ancient Greek σης/sēs, σητος/sētos meaning "moth" with -φαγος/-phagos meaning "-eating".

Four subspecies are recognised:

- S. p. pinus (Linnaeus, 1766) – breeds southeast Canada and east USA
- S. p. florida (Maynard, 1906) – south Florida
- S. p. achrustera (Bangs, 1900) – Bahamas
- S. p. chrysoleuca (Griscom, 1923) – Hispaniola

== Description ==
These birds have white bellies, two white wing bars, dark legs and thin, relatively long pointed bills; they have yellowish 'spectacles' around their eyes. Adult males have olive upperparts and bright yellow throats and breasts; females and immatures display upperparts which are olive-brown. Their throats and breasts are paler. The adult male pine warbler looks somewhat similar to the yellow-throated vireo which may cause some identification problems.

Standard Measurements
Total Body Length	5–5.75 in (127–146 mm)
Weight	12 g (0.42 oz)
Wingspan	8.75 in (222 mm)
Wing	68.9–72.8 mm (2.71–2.87 in)
Tail	52.9–56 mm (2.08–2.20 in)
Culmen	9.9–11.6 mm (0.39–0.46 in)
Tarsus	17.2–18.7 mm (0.68–0.74 in)

The song of this bird is a musical trill. Their calls are slurred chips.

== Distribution and habitat ==
Their breeding habitats are open pine woods in eastern North America. These birds are permanent residents in southern Florida. Some of them, however, migrate to northeastern Mexico and islands in Bermuda and the Caribbean. The first record for South America was a vagrant wintering female seen at Vista Nieve, Colombia, on 20 November 2002; this bird was foraging as part of a mixed-species feeding flock that also included wintering Blackburnian and Tennessee warblers.

== Behavior ==
They forage slowly on tree trunks and branches by poking their bill into pine cones. These birds also find food by searching for it on the ground. These birds mainly eat insects, seeds and berries.

Their nests are deep, open cups, which are placed near the end of a tree branch. Pine warblers prefer to nest in pine trees, hence their names. Three to five blotched white eggs are laid.
