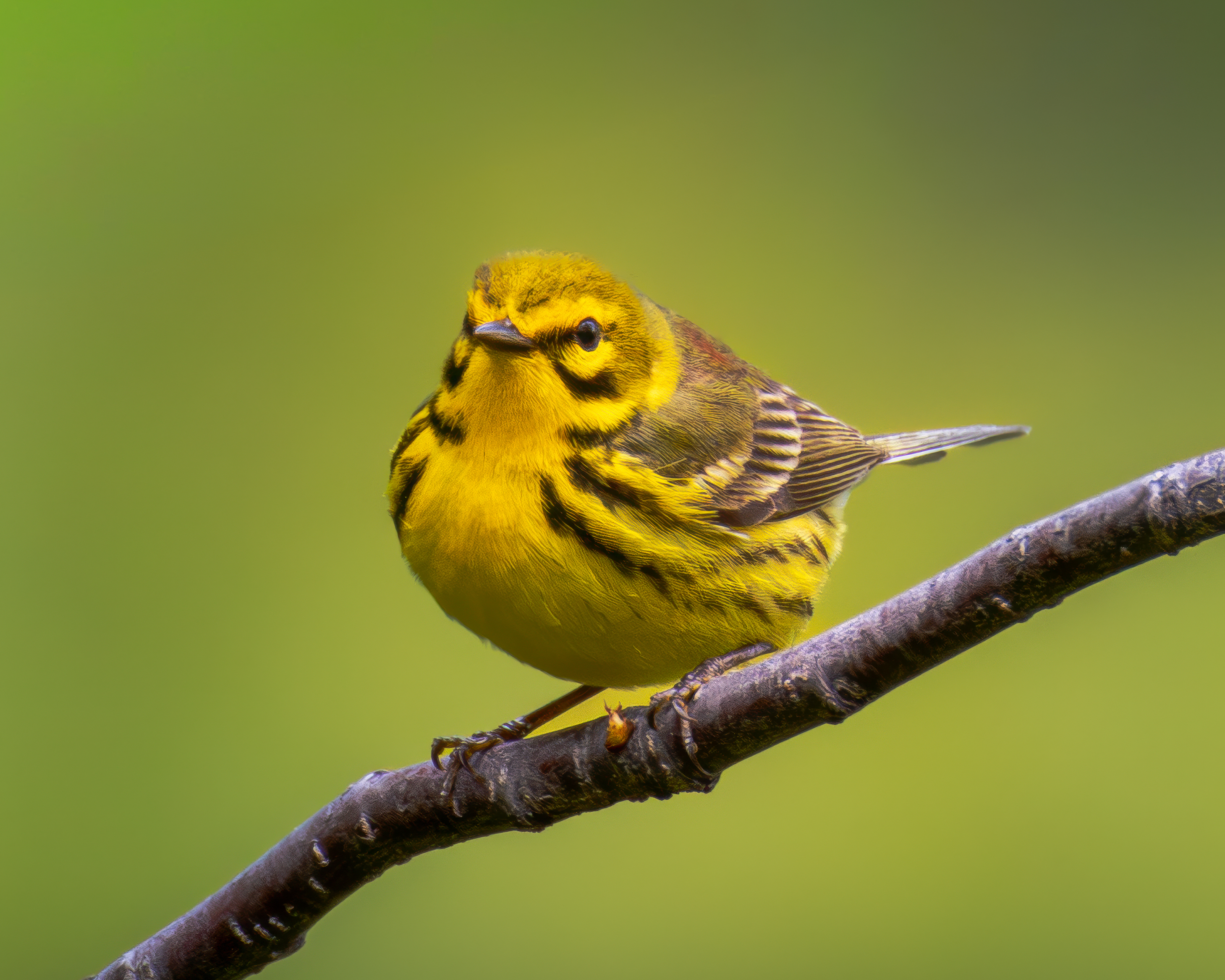
- Male, New York City
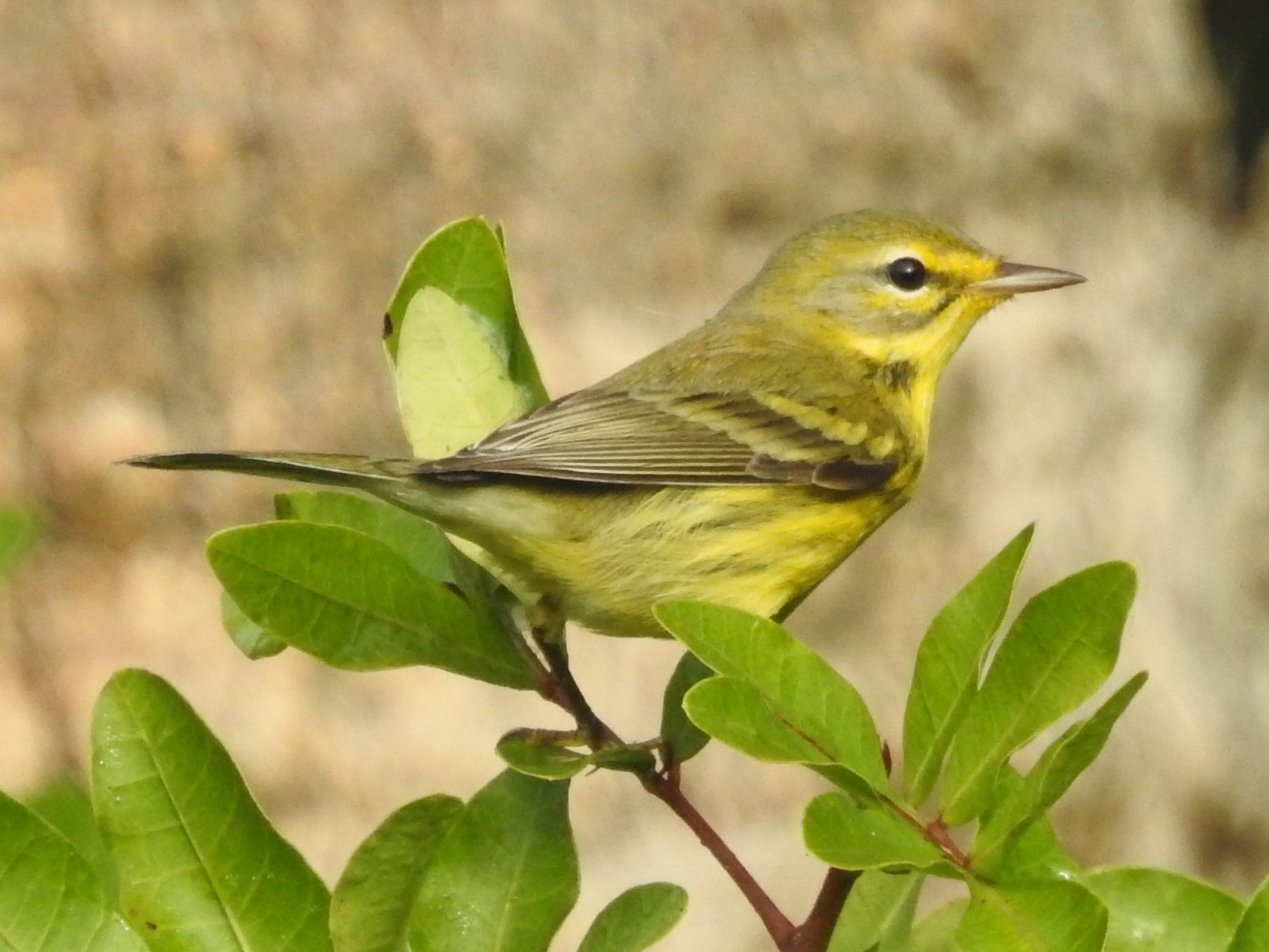
- Female, Florida

Conservation status
- Least Concern (IUCN 3.1)

Scientific classification
- Kingdom: Animalia
- Phylum: Chordata
- Class: Aves
- Order: Passeriformes
- Family: Parulidae
- Genus: Setophaga
- Species: S. discolor

Binomial name
- Setophaga discolor (Vieillot, 1809)
- Range of S. discolor Breeding range Winter range

Synonyms
- Sylvia discolor; Dendroica discolor

= Prairie warbler =

Species of bird

The prairie warbler (Setophaga discolor) is a small songbird of the New World warbler family.

== Taxonomy ==
The prairie warbler belongs to the genus Setophaga. The species was described by the French ornithologist Louis Pierre Vieillot in a work published in 1807 documenting North American birds, where he called the bird Sylvia discolor, although the genus designation Sylvia was not later retained. It was also previously assigned to the genus Dendroica before that genus was merged into Setophaga.

The vernacular name "prairie warbler" is attributed to the Scottish-American naturalist Alexander Wilson who saw the species in 1810 in prairie country in southwestern Kentucky. This name is arguably misleading, since the bird generally prefers shrubbery and small trees rather than true open prairie habitats.

There are two recognized subspecies, S. d. discolor and S. d. paludicola. The first, S. d. discolor, is the migratory form which breeds throughout the full range and spends winters in Florida and the West Indies. The second, S. d. paludicola, is the sedentary form which permanently inhabits the coasts of Florida. American zoologist Arthur H. Howell is credited with describing S. d. paludicola in a paper published in 1930. H. H. Bailey had also previously described the subspecies sometime from 1926 to 1930 (date uncertain), but he did not publish it publicly.

== Description ==
These birds have yellow underparts with dark streaks on the flanks. In males, the back is olive green with chestnut or rufuos streaks. A black stripe runs through the eye, and another black stripe runs from the beak down the throat. This semicircular stripe gives them a distinctive "tired" look. They have two faint wing bars. Their tails have large white areas, and they have dark legs. Coloring is duller in females and immature birds, and streaks are fainter or absent. The subspecies S. d. paludicola is also duller overall.

=== Measurements ===
The prairie warbler typically measures from 11 to 13 cm (4.3 to 5.1 in) in length. The typical adult wingspan measures from 5.4 to 5.8 cm (2.1 to 2.3 in) for males or 5.1 to 5.7 cm (2.0 to 2.2 in) for females. The bird weighs about 7.7 g (0.27 oz).

The tail of an adult male measures from 4.7 to 5.1 cm (1.9 to 2.0 in), the exposed culmen measures from 9 to 10 mm (0.35 to 0.39 in), and the tarsus measures from 17 to 19 mm (0.67 to 0.75 in).

=== Vocalizations ===
Prairie warblers have two categories of songs, referred to as Type A and Type B. Type A songs are typically a series of ascending buzzy notes. The B songs are an ascending series of whistled notes that often contain some buzzy notes. Compared to A songs, the B songs are lower in pitch and have fewer, longer notes. The total song length is longer as well in Type B songs. The use of these two song categories is associated with certain contexts. A songs are sung throughout the day when males first arrive on their breeding grounds. Once males are paired they begin to sing B songs during the dawn chorus and then will intersperse A songs in their singing during the rest of the day. During this later period of singing A songs are typically used near females, near the nest, and in the center of their territories. In contrast B songs are used when interacting or fighting with other males and near the borders of their territories.

Part of their call note repertoire is a tsip call. During dawn, chorus B songs are interspersed with rapid loud "check" calls.

== Distribution ==
The full breeding range of the subspecies S. d. discolor includes much of the eastern United States, with the highest population density in the southeast. Isolated populations have been observed as far west as Kansas, Iowa, and Michigan. Their reach extends as far north as Ontario and New Brunswick in Canada.

The winter range of S. d. discolor includes the southern portion of Florida, the Bahamas, the Greater Antilles, and the eastern coast of Mexico and further along the coast of Central America as far south as Honduras. The subspecies S. d. paludicola inhabits the coasts of Florida year-round.

== Behaviour and ecology ==
=== Breeding ===
Their breeding habitats are brushy areas and forest edges in eastern North America. The prairie warbler's nests are open cups, which are usually placed in a low area of a tree or shrub. Incubation period is 12 to 13 days. Female warblers usually lay three to five eggs. The eggs are white with speckles which have been described as "chestnut," "auburn," or "russet."

Prairie warblers are victims of nest parasitism by the brown-headed cowbird, which causes them to raise young cowbirds instead of their own chicks or sometimes to abandon affected nests all together.

=== Feeding ===
Prairie warblers forage for insects. The majority of their foraging behavior comprises gleaning from twigs, leaves, and infrequently trunks and branches. Less common tactics include fly-catching, hovering, and chasing. Rarely, they have been observed pecking the ground, feeding on nectar, and web-picking.

=== Behaviour ===
Prairie warblers wag, or pump, their tails frequently, which is a behavior they have in common with Palm warblers and Kirtland's warblers.

== Status ==
Although the species is not considered to be in danger of extinction, its population size likely peaked in the 1940s or 1950s and has been declining since then. Across the Appalachians and Southeastern United States, this decline generally ranges from 50 to 70 percent.

== Gallery ==
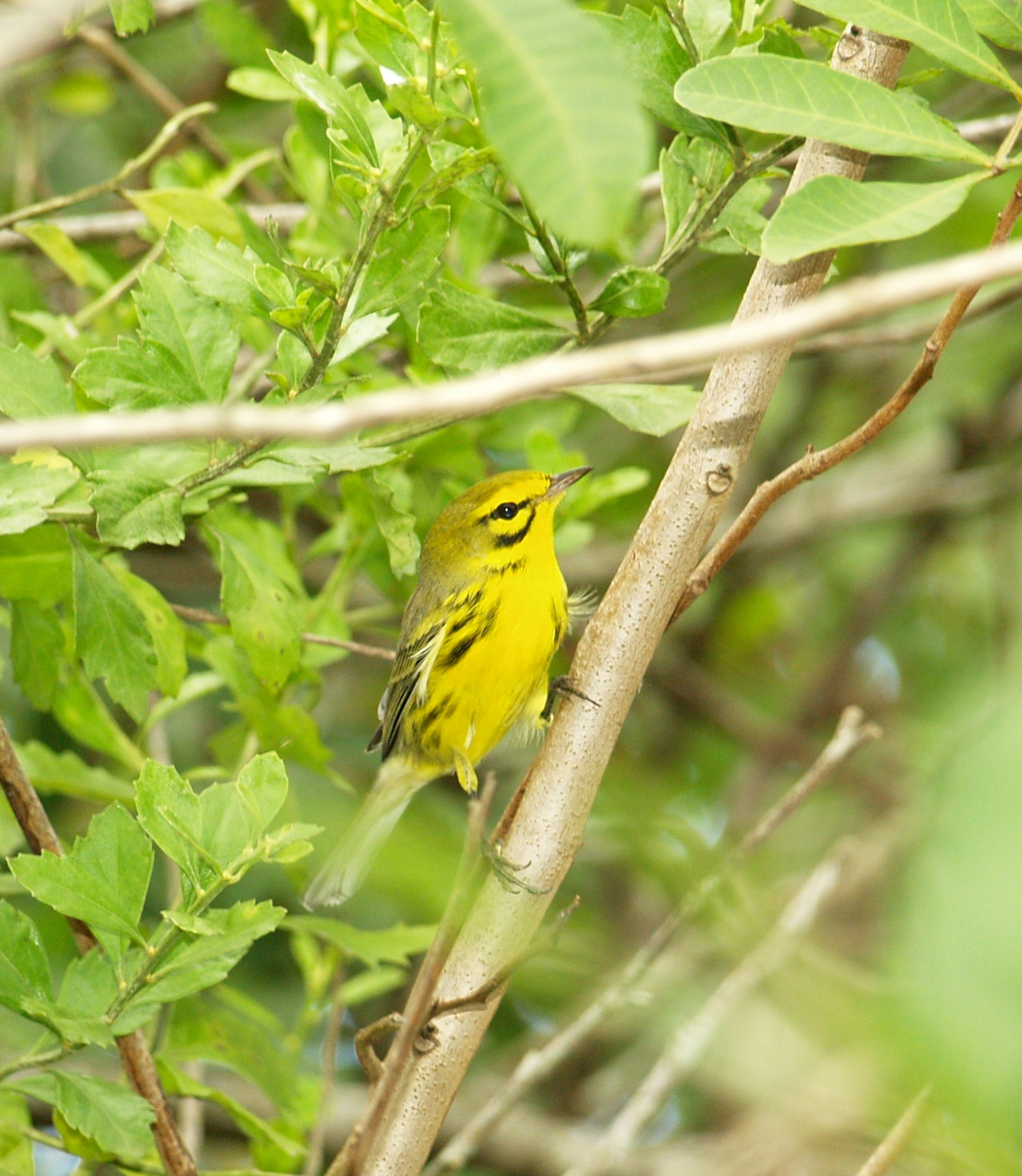
In Everglades National Park.

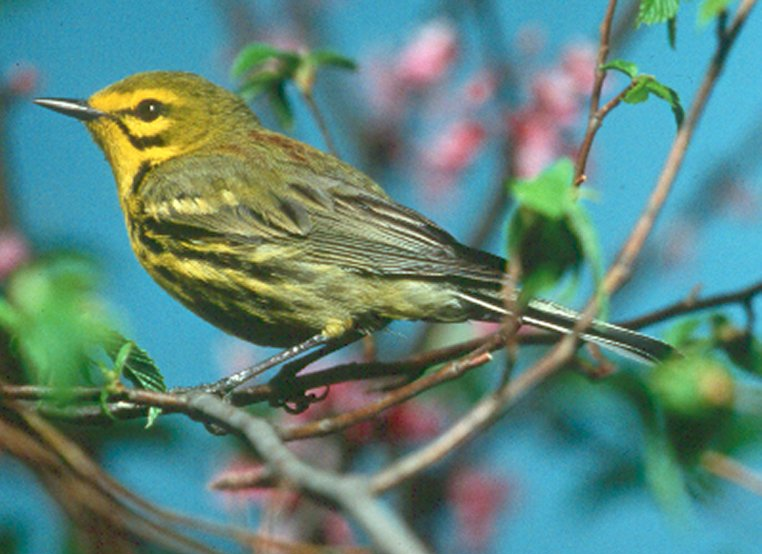

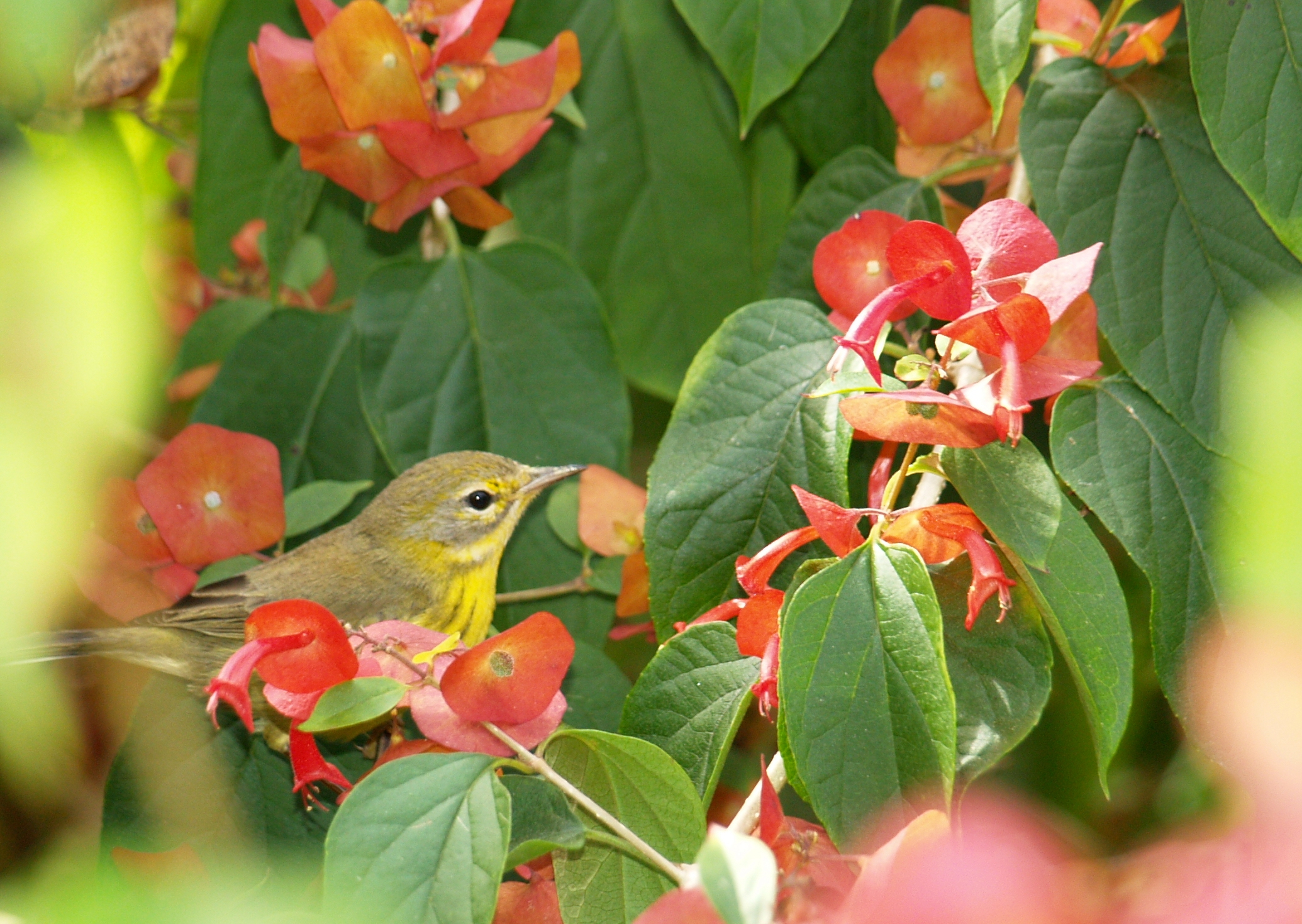
At Castellow Hammock, Miami, FL.
