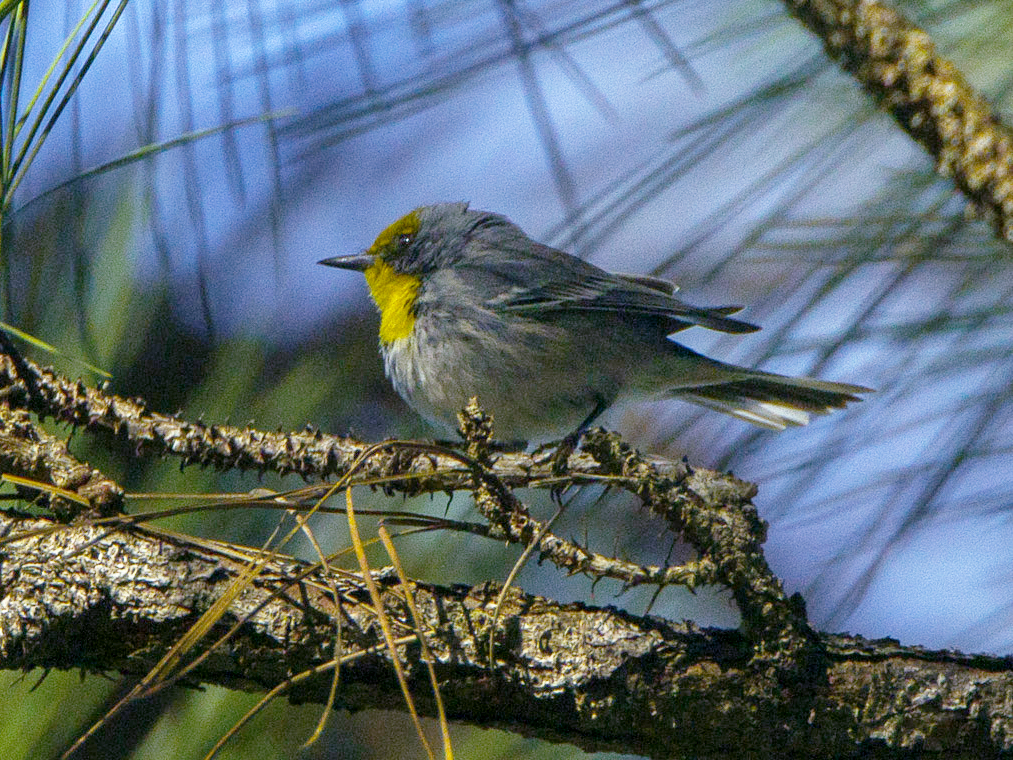

Conservation status
- Least Concern (IUCN 3.1)

Scientific classification
- Kingdom: Animalia
- Phylum: Chordata
- Class: Aves
- Order: Passeriformes
- Family: Parulidae
- Genus: Setophaga
- Species: S. pityophila

Binomial name
- Setophaga pityophila (Gundlach, 1855)

Synonyms
- See text

= Olive-capped warbler =

Species of bird

[[

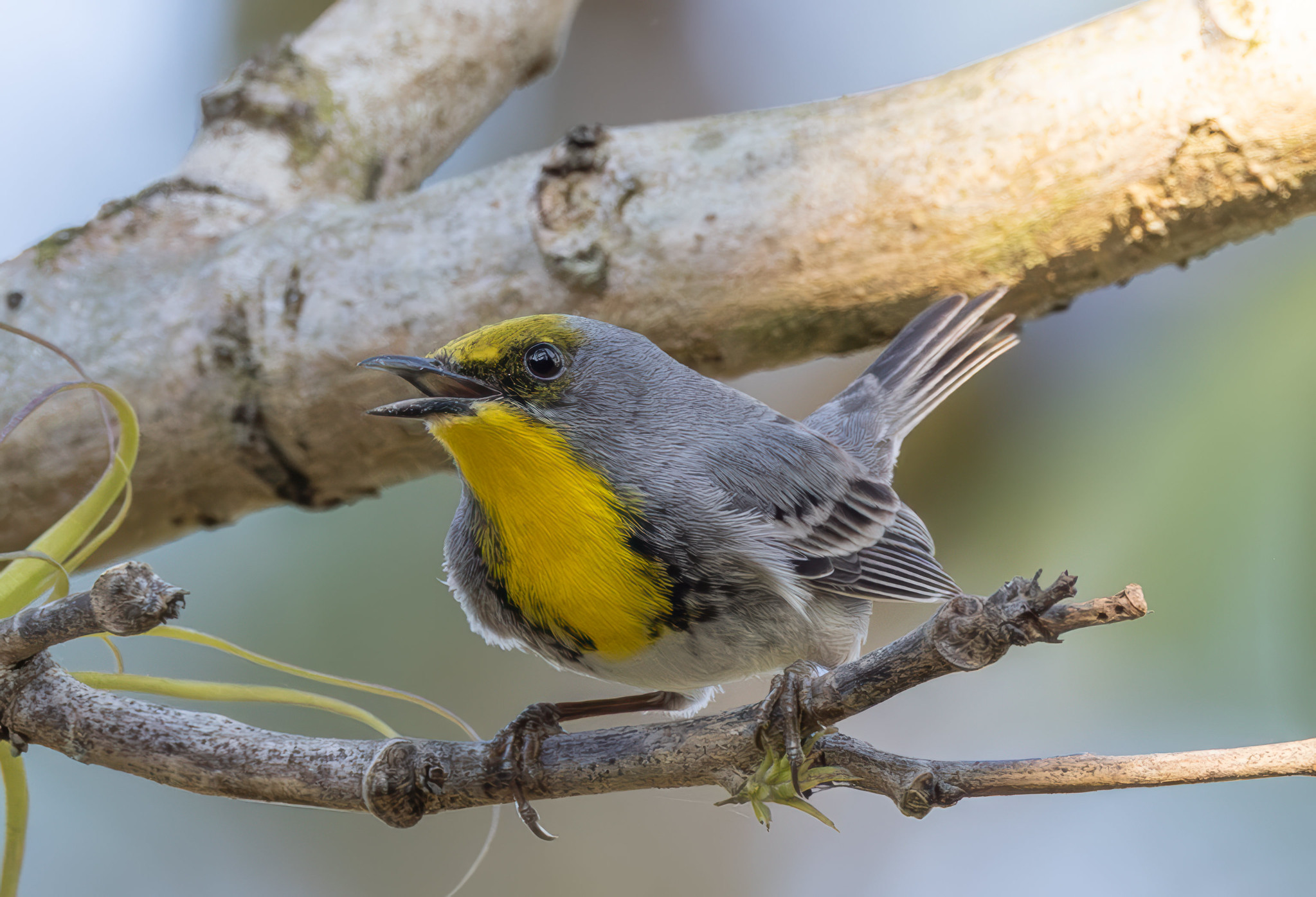
Las Terrazas, Provincia de Pinar del Río, Cuba

|thumb]]

The olive-capped warbler (Setophaga pityophila) is a species of bird in the family Parulidae, the New World warblers. It is found in Cuba and in the Bahamas on Grand Bahama, Little Abaco, and Great Abaco.

[[

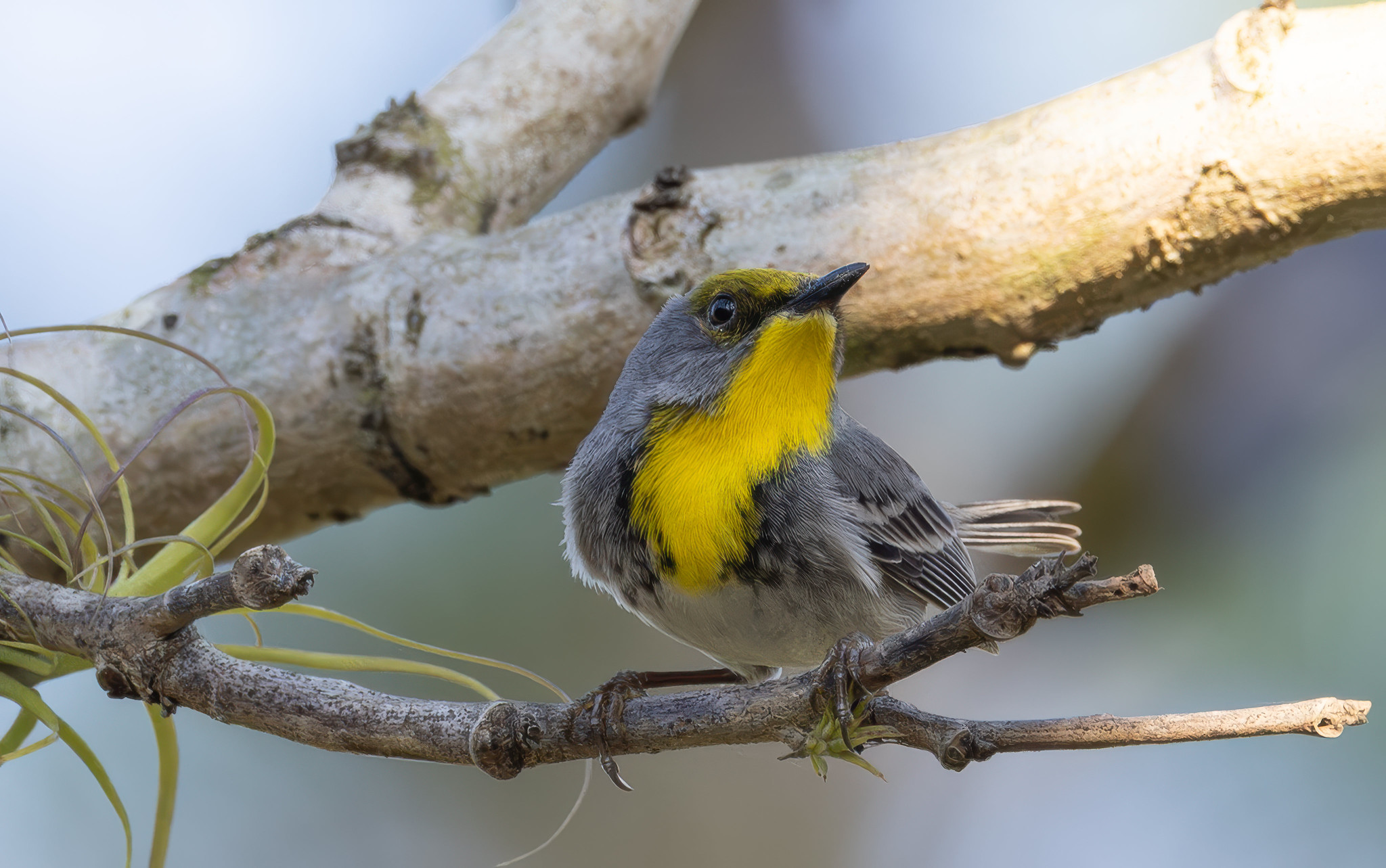
Las Terrazas, Provincia de Pinar del Río, Cuba

|thumb]]

== Taxonomy and systematics ==
The olive-capped warbler was formally described by Juan Gundlach in 1855 as Sylvicola pityophila; Gundlach called it the "Cuban pine wood warbler". It was later reassigned to genus Dendroica. Beginning in 2011 taxonomic systems merged that genus into its present genus Setophaga.

The olive-capped warbler is monotypic.

== Description ==
The olive-capped warbler is about 12.5 to 13 cm (4.9 to 5.1 in) long and weighs 7.2 to 8.7 g (0.25 to 0.31 oz). The sexes have the same plumage except that males' average brighter than females'. Adults have a yellowish olive crown, black lores, and a thin yellow line above the lores that extends to the top of the eye on an otherwise slate-gray to plumbeous face. Their upperparts are also slate-gray to plumbeous. Their wings are slate-gray to plumbeous with white tips on the greater and median coverts that show as two wing bars. Their tail is slate-gray to plumbeous with some white on the outer two pairs of feathers. Their throat and breast are yellow and their belly and undertail coverts white. The sides of their breast have some irregular black streaks and their flanks have a brownish-olive to grayish tinge. Both sexes have a dark iris, a blackish bill, and blackish brown legs and feet. Juveniles have a brownish head and upperparts, indistinct wing bars, and paler underparts than adults.

== Distribution and habitat ==
The olive-capped warbler is found in two areas of Cuba, Pinar del Río Province on the far western end of the island and Holguín, Santiago de Cuba, and Guantánamo provinces at the eastern end. It is also found in the Bahamas on Grand Bahama, Little Abaco, and Great Abaco islands. Though the IUCN states that it also is found in the Turks and Caicos Islands, no other source includes that archipelago. True to its original English name, it almost exclusively inhabits pine forest. It occasionally can also be found in adjacent mixed pine-hardwood forest. In elevation it ranges from sea level to 2,000 m (6,600 ft).

== Behavior ==
=== Movement ===
The olive-capped warbler is a sedentary year-round resident.

=== Feeding ===
The olive-capped warbler's diet has not been studied; it is assumed to be mostly insects and other arthropods. In the Bahamas it has been noted at the flowers of century plants (Agave braceana) but it is not known if they were seeking insects or nectar.

=== Breeding ===
The olive-capped warbler breeds between March and June. Its nest is a cup; its main structure has not been described but feathers have been noted as lining. It is usually built close to the trunk of a pine tree between 2 and 15 m (10 and 50 ft) above the ground. The clutch is two eggs that are whitish with brown spots. The incubation period, time to fledging, and details of parental care are not known.

=== Vocalization ===
The olive-capped warbler's song is "high, melodious [and] whistle-like...generally 8 quick notes, wisi-wisi-wisi...". Its call is tsip.

== Status ==
The IUCN has assessed the olive-capped warbler as being of Least Concern. Its population size is not known and is believed to be decreasing. No immediate threats have been identified. It is considered "common, but extremely local" in its limited range.
