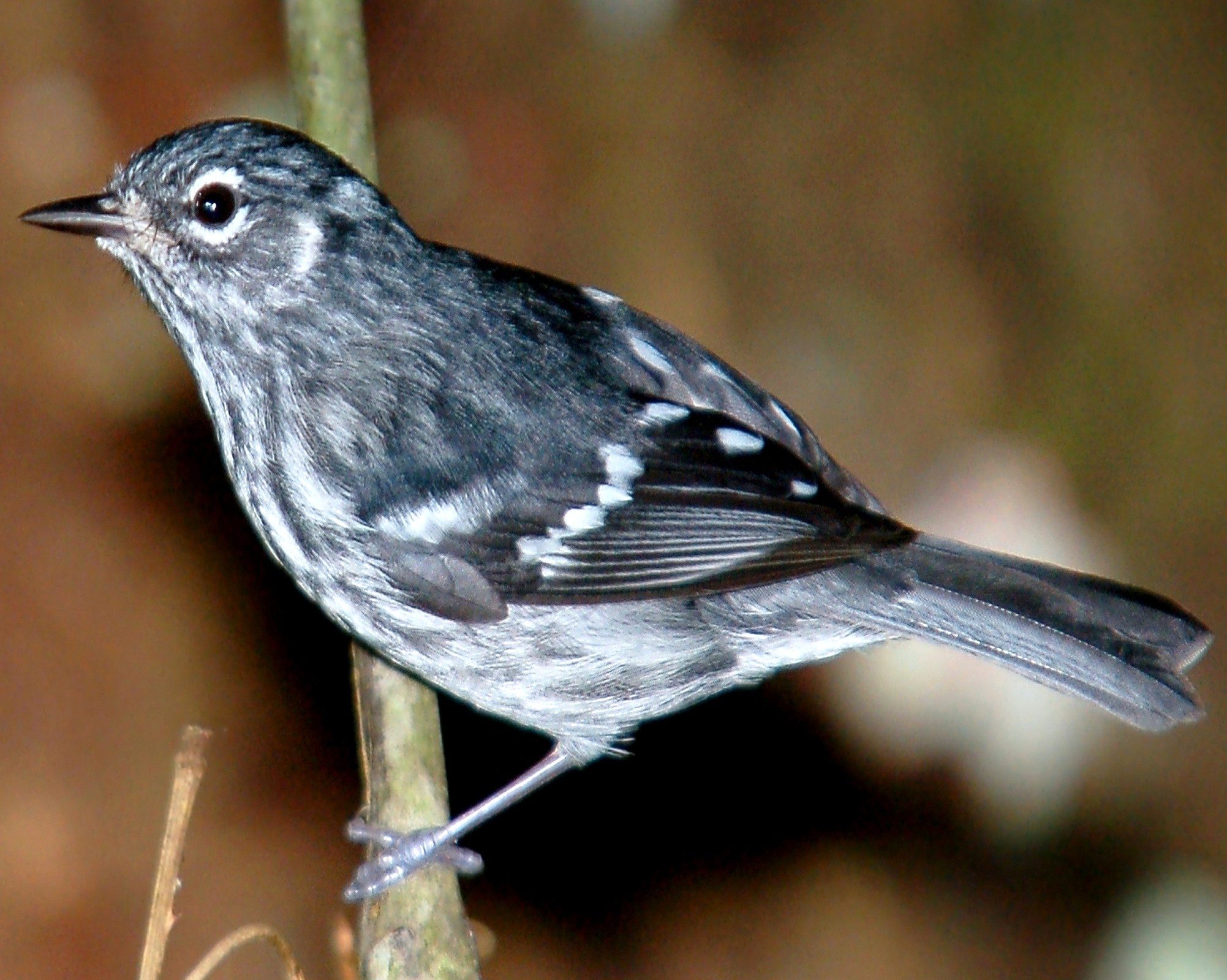

Conservation status
- Endangered (IUCN 3.1)

Scientific classification
- Kingdom: Animalia
- Phylum: Chordata
- Class: Aves
- Order: Passeriformes
- Family: Parulidae
- Genus: Setophaga
- Species: S. angelae

Binomial name
- Setophaga angelae (Kepler & Parkes, 1972)
- Range of the elfin woods warbler: Extant (resident) Extant (passage)

Synonyms
- Dendroica angelae

= Elfin woods warbler =

Species of bird endemic to Puerto Rico

The elfin woods warbler (Setophaga angelae) is a species of bird endemic to Puerto Rico, where it is local and uncommon. Discovered in 1968 and described in 1972, it is the most recently described New World warbler (family Parulidae).

The species name, angelae, is a tribute to Angela Kepler, one of its discoverers. These birds are insectivores, as they feed by gleaning small insects off the habitat leaves.

Due to its small populations and restricted habitats, conservation efforts were begun in 1982 to protect this species, but as of 2005, the warbler was still in need of protection. The species is not in immediate danger as the majority of its habitat is protected forest, but introduced species (such as rats and small Asian mongooses), habitat reduction, and natural disasters represent potential threats to the population.

== Discovery, taxonomy and naming ==
The elfin woods warbler is one of many species in the genus Setophaga of the New World warbler family Parulidae. It was first observed in 1968 by Cameron and Angela Kepler while they were conducting observations on two Puerto Rican endemic birds, the Puerto Rican amazon and the Puerto Rican tody. On May 18, 1971, a specimen was captured in El Yunque National Forest, which at the time was believed to be its only location. A year later, Cameron Kepler and Kenneth Parkes described the species and named it Dendroica angelae, making it the most recently discovered New World warbler. It is the first species described in the Caribbean since 1927 and the first Puerto Rican species described in the 20th century. Although the species was initially placed in the genus Dendroica, phylogenetic studies in 2010 using mitochondrial DNA sequences from New World warblers led to a revision of warbler genera. As a result, the study's authors recommended subsuming the genus Dendroica into the genus Setophaga. The same studies showed that the elfin woods warbler is most closely related to the arrowhead warbler, which is endemic to Jamaica, and the plumbeous warbler, which is endemic to the islands of Dominica and Guadeloupe. In 2011, the American Ornithologists' Union reorganized the classification of the family Parulidae and transferred species in Dendroica to Setophaga. This revised classification was subsequently adopted by the International Ornithologists' Union.

The genus name is a combination of the Ancient Greek words ses, meaning "moth", and phagos, meaning "eating". The specific name, angelae, is a tribute to Angela Kepler. Elfin-woods warbler is an alternative spelling, and Reinita de Bosque Enano is the Spanish name.

== Description ==
The elfin woods warbler is a small passerine, averaging 12.5 cm (5 in) in length and 8.4 g (0.30 oz) in weight. Its upperparts are predominantly black with white areas, and its underparts are white with black streaks. Other identifying characteristics are dark brown eyes, white patches on its ears and neck, an incomplete white eyering, a white eyestripe, and two white spots on its outer tail feathers. Like other Antillean warblers (Adelaide's warbler, Saint Lucia warbler, plumbeous warbler, and arrowhead warbler), it has a long bill and short, round wings (53.8 mm or 2.12 in average). Among Setophaga species, only Adelaide's warbler has a shorter average wing length. Juveniles differ from adults, retaining a grayish-green back for approximately a year and partially molting from July to October.

=== Similar species ===
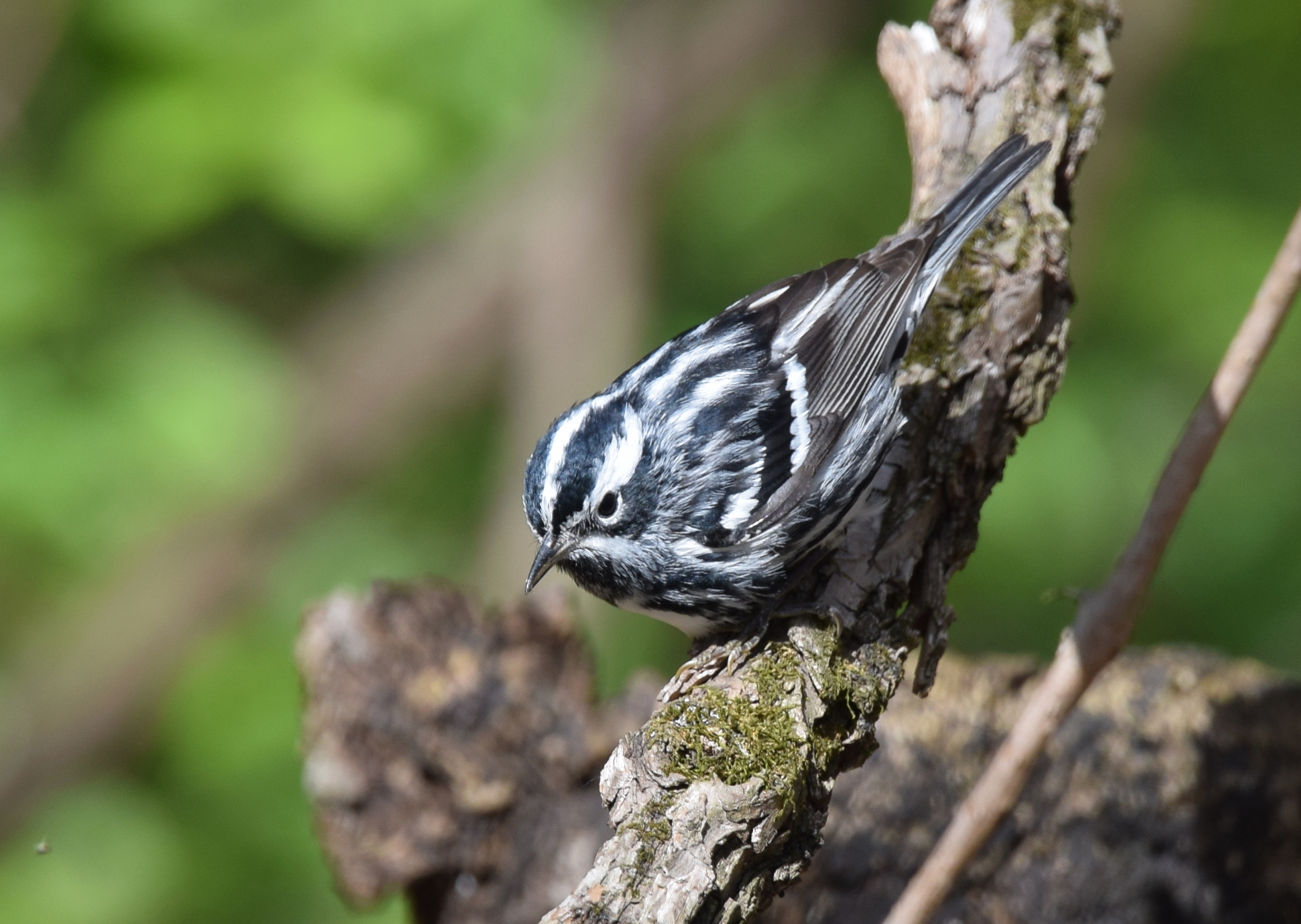
Black-and-white warbler, a species commonly mistaken for the elfin woods warbler

The elfin woods warbler can be confused with the black-and-white warbler, a non-breeding visitor that occurs in Puerto Rico from mid-September to early May. The main physical distinction between the two is in the face. The elfin woods warbler has an incomplete white eye-ring, while the black-and-white warbler has a bold white supercilium above the eye, and the lower half of a white eye-ring. The elfin woods warbler has an entirely black crown while the black-and-white warbler's is bisected by a white stripe. The latter species tends to forage on larger branches, while the elfin woods warbler forages in the canopy and on smaller branch tips.

=== Voice ===
The elfin woods warbler's song and call are difficult to hear. The species has a subtle voice and its call and song resemble those of the bananaquit, the most abundant bird in Puerto Rico. The song is a series of "short, rapidly uttered, rather unmusical notes on one pitch, swelling in volume and terminating with a short series of distinct double syllables sounding slightly lower in pitch" while the call has been described as "a single, short, metallic chip".

== Behavior ==
=== Breeding ===
The elfin woods warbler breeds from March to June. Both parents are involved in the construction of the nest and in feeding the chicks. Nests are built close to the tree trunk within dry aerial leaf litter, usually Cecropia leaves (a material used by no other Parulidae species), in Bulbophyllum wadsworthii trees. Nests are well-concealed and located 1.3 to 7.6 meters (4.3 to 24.9 ft) above ground level. In 2003 a nest with four chicks was found inside a tree stump of Colorado tree, Cyrilla racemiflora, at Maricao. The nest was at about 15 feet above ground level, with little cover in a secondary forest area. Nests are cup-shaped and made from small roots and twigs, dry leaves of Chusquea abietifolia and B. wadsworthii, and dry Panicum maximum leaves. The interior is made from fibers of C. abietifolia, dry leaves and other plant matter. Females lay two or three white eggs with red-brown spots. The chick's diet consists of insects—parents have been observed offering lepidopteran and orthopteran adults and lepidopteran larvae to hatchlings.

=== Feeding ===
The elfin woods warbler is commonly found foraging the middle canopy for insects. While searching for food it often flocks with other birds, such as black-and-white warblers, Puerto Rican tanagers and Lesser Antillean pewees. Three maneuvers used for catching prey—gleaning, sally-hovering and probing—have been described. Gleaning is described as a hunting maneuver made by a standing or moving bird. Sally-hovering is a hunting maneuver made by a bird in flight. Probing is a maneuver in which the bird, by digging with its beak, forages the substrate looking for food in a manner similar to chickens. Gleaning, especially off leaves, is the maneuver used with more frequency by the elfin woods warbler while probing is the least used.

== Distribution and habitat ==
When first discovered, the elfin woods warbler was believed to exclusively occur in the high elevation, from 640 to 1,030 meters (2,100 to 3,380 ft), dwarf or elfin forests of the El Yunque National Forest in eastern Puerto Rico. The wind-clipped trees in these forests rarely exceed 5 meters (16 ft) in height and are characterized by stiff, thick twigs, leathery leaves and impenetrable, dense undergrowth ideal for hiding from predators. Later studies showed that the species migrated to lower elevations, between 370 and 600 meters (1,210 and 1,970 ft), in Tabonuco and Palo Colorado forests. Three more populations were discovered in the Maricao State Forest (1972, largest known population), the Carite State Forest (1977) and the Toro Negro State Forest (late 1970s).

The species is presumed extirpated from two locales, occurring only at El Yunque National Forest and the Maricao State Forest. The elfin forest at El Yunque National Forest is characterized by high rainfall and humidity, low temperatures and insolation, and constant winds. It is found at mountain summits and is primarily composed of dense shrub and small trees with moss and epiphyte growth in its plants and floor. The species richness is low when compared to other types of forests (tabonuco, palo Colorado and palma sierra forests) found in the Luquillo Mountains. The elfin forest at the Maricao State Forest, located in western Puerto Rico, receives an annual average rainfall of 2,250 millimeters (90 in), a high amount considering that a rainforest, by definition, receives a minimum of 1,700 millimeters (67 in) annually. Since its soil has low water-holding capacity its vegetation is more xeric than expected. The species's highest density occurs in Podocarpus forests in the Maricao State Forest. Little information is available on the elfin forests at Toro Negro and Carite.

== Status and conservation ==
=== Population ===
Bird count of the elfin woods warbler (2001)

In September 1989, Hurricane Hugo struck the central and eastern region of Puerto Rico, affecting three of the four known populations of the elfin woods warbler; the El Yunque National Forest, Toro Negro, and Carite populations were all impacted. A survey conducted two years later in the Toro Negro Forest, located in the Cordillera Central, did not find any individuals. Surveys conducted since then suggest that, for reasons yet unknown, the populations at Carite and Toro Negro were likely extirpated. Continued monitoring of the elfin woods warbler populations is achieved through bird counts performed every three to four years by the Puerto Rican Breeding Bird Survey (PRBBS). A survey conducted in 2001 found three individuals at the Maricao State Forest. An IUCN assessment of the elfin woods warbler, prepared in 2000, estimated a stable population of 600 mature individuals. In 2020 the population was estimated to comprise at least 1800 mature individuals, a figure which equates to at least 2700 individual birds.

=== Threats ===
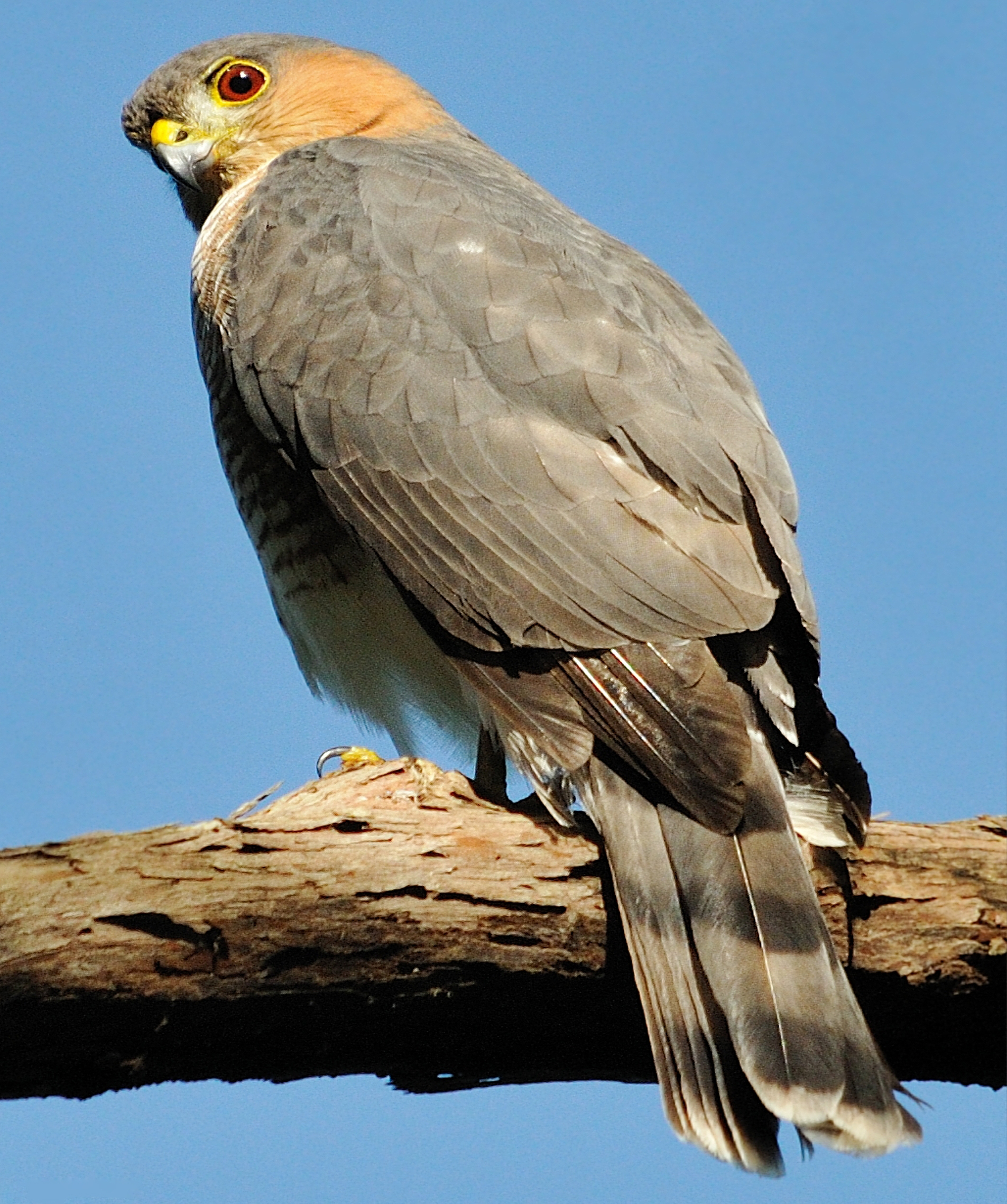
Puerto Rican sharp-shinned hawk, a natural predator of the elfin woods warbler

The elfin woods warbler faces two main threats: predation, and the destruction or alteration of suitable habitat. The pearly-eyed thrasher, the Puerto Rican sharp-shinned hawk and the now extirpated white-necked crow are all confirmed native predators. Unconfirmed but potential native predators include two endemic snakes and several carnivores known from fossil records. Introduced species, such as domestic cats and dogs, black rats, and small Asian mongooses, are also potential nest predators. These introduced species have proliferated in the Maricao State Forest and El Yunque National Forest due to the presence of facilities built mainly for communication purposes. Both natural and human factors contribute to the destruction of the elfin woods warbler's habitat. The construction of communication towers, logging, and the expansion of roads and trails have all caused habitat destruction within the warbler's range. Natural disasters such as forest fires and hurricanes have also decimated habitat.

=== Protection ===
The elfin woods warbler was placed on the United States federal candidate list for the Endangered Species Act in 1999, and the announcement was published on the Federal Register of October 25, 1999. The USFWS started to consider the need to protect the elfin woods warbler in 1982. In 2005, a group of scientists, scholars, artists and environmentalists petitioned the Bush administration to admit 225 species, including the elfin woods warbler, to Endangered Species Act protections.

The International Union for Conservation of Nature (IUCN) first evaluated the status of the elfin woods warbler in 1988. At the time, it was given a classification of lower risk/least concern. Its status was changed to lower risk/near threatened in 1994, to vulnerable in 2000, and to endangered in 2017. The organization justified the warbler's move to endangered status due to the combination of its very small range and its continuing decline due to habitat destruction and degradation.

== See also ==
- Fauna of Puerto Rico
- List of birds of Puerto Rico
- List of endemic fauna of Puerto Rico
- List of Vieques birds
- El Toro Wilderness
