= Angela Kepler =

New Zealand naturalist and author

Angela Kay Kepler (born 1943) is a New Zealand-born naturalist and author. She is a graduate of the University of Canterbury, New Zealand and has a master's degree from the University of Hawaiʻi and a doctorate from Cornell University, New York in 1972. She also undertook a one-year post doctoral position at Oxford University.

She has conducted research in Hawaii, Alaska, Russia and the Caribbean. Two bird species have been named for her: the elfin-woods warbler (Setophaga angelae), a Puerto Rican endemic; and the extinct Hawaiian rail Porzana keplerorum.

She has a farm on Maui and grows some 32 different banana varieties.

== Bibliography ==
Publications by Angela Kepler

- The World of Bananas in Hawaii: Then and Now - 2012
- West Maui: A Natural History Guide - 2007
- Haleakala: From Summit to Sea - 2005
- A Pocket Guide To Maui's Hana Highway: A Visitor's Guide - May 2004
- Exotic Tropicals of Hawaii: Heliconias, Gingers, Anthuriums, and Decorative Foliage - 1999
- Hawaiian Heritage Plants - 1998
- Maui's Floral Splendor - 1995
- Haleakala: A Guide to the Mountain - 1992
- Majestic Molokai: A Nature Lover's Guide - 1992
- Sunny South Maui: A Guide to Kihwailea & Makena Including Kahoolawe - 1992
- Trees of Hawaiʻi - 1991
- Proteas in Hawaii - 1988
