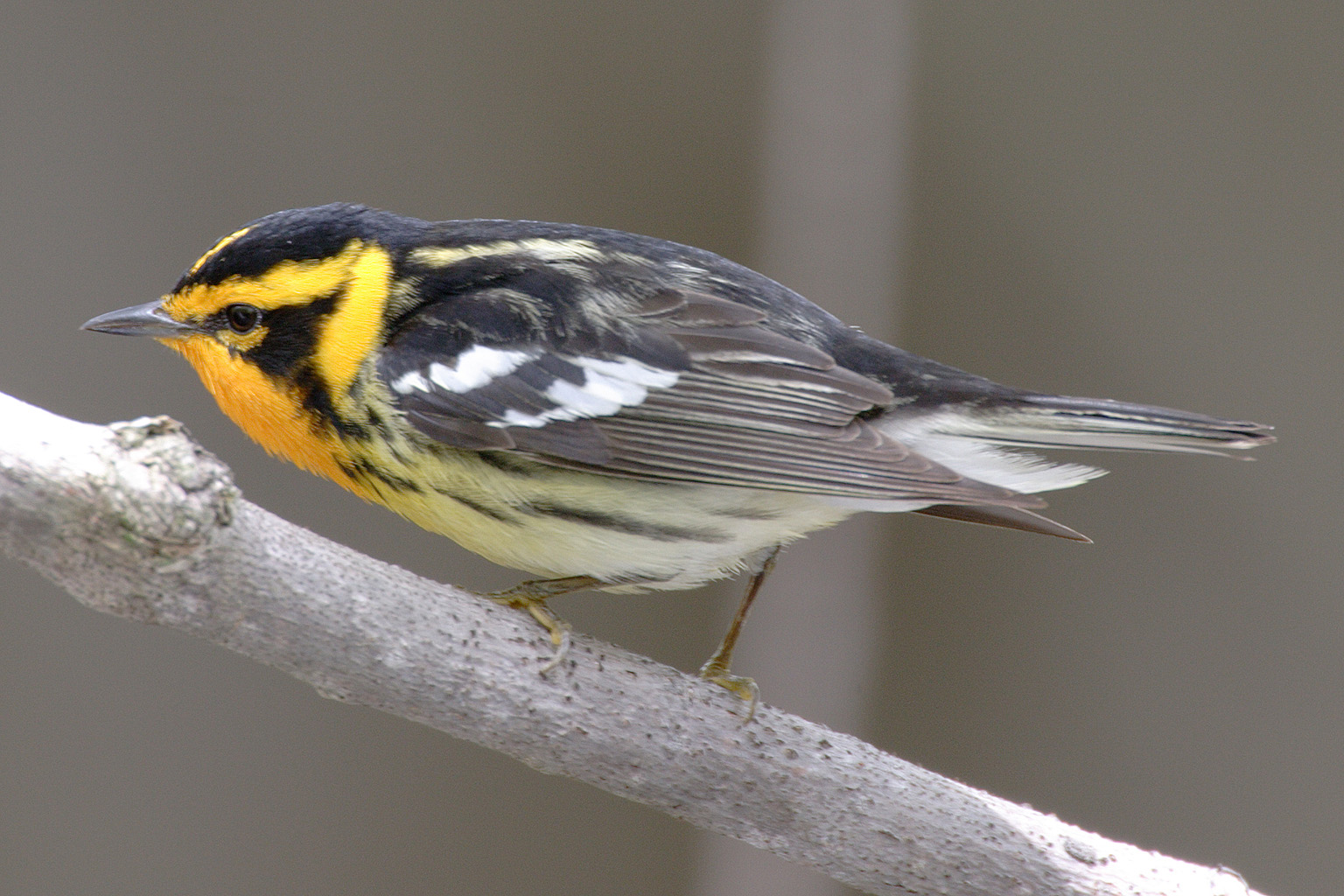
- Blackburnian warbler, Setophaga fusca

Scientific classification
- Kingdom: Animalia
- Phylum: Chordata
- Class: Aves
- Order: Passeriformes
- Family: Parulidae
- Genus: Setophaga; Swainson, 1827

Type species
- Motacilla ruticilla Linnaeus, 1758

Synonyms
- Parula Bonaparte, 1838; Dendroica G. R. Gray, 1842

= Setophaga =

Genus of birds

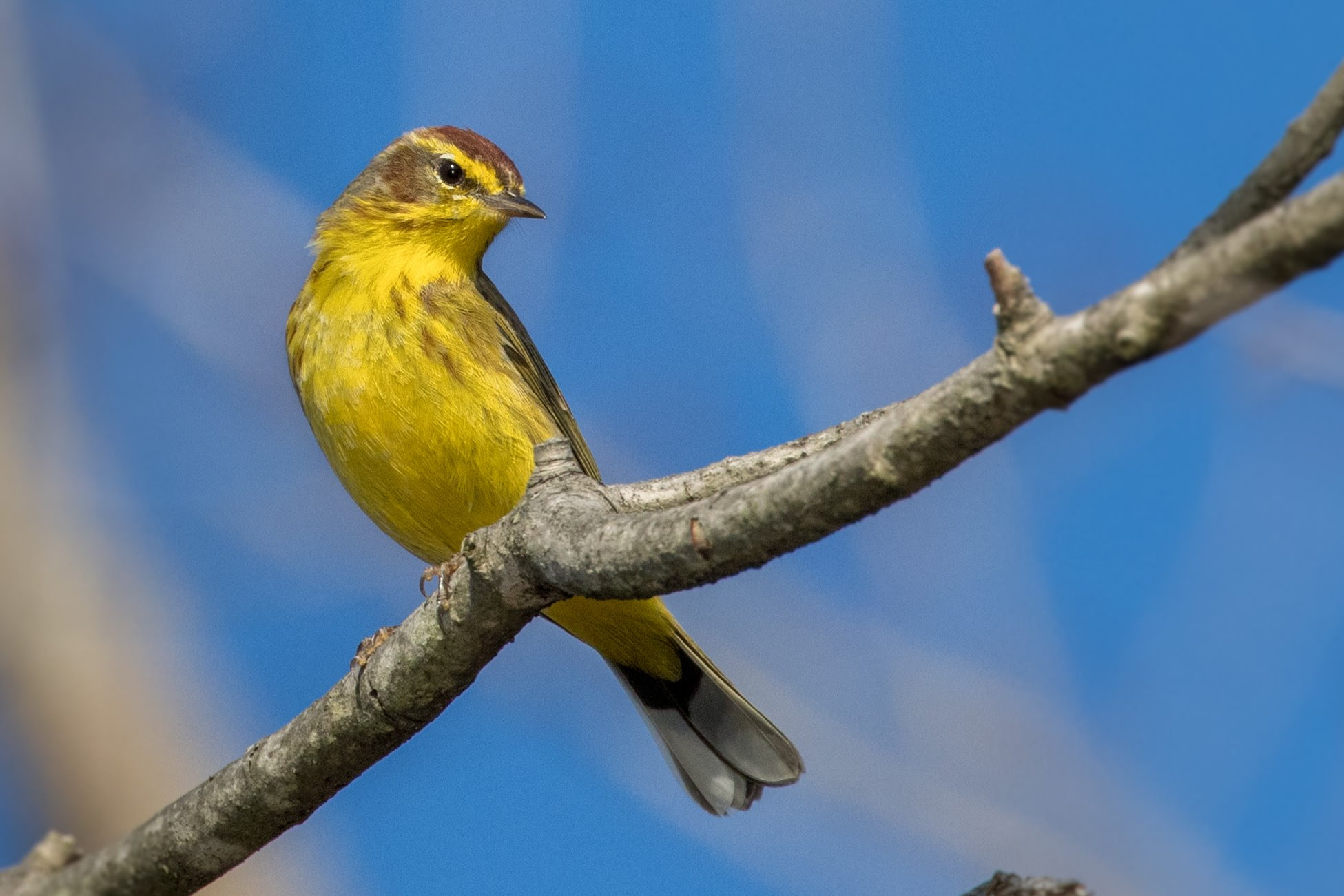
The palm warbler is a member of genus Setophaga

Setophaga is a genus of birds of the New World warbler family Parulidae. It contains at least 37 species. The Setophaga warblers are an example of adaptive radiation with the various species using different feeding techniques and often feeding in different parts of the same tree.

Most Setophaga species are long-range migrants, wintering in or near the New World tropics and seasonally migrating to breed in North America. In contrast, two Setophaga species, the palm warbler and yellow-rumped warbler, have winter ranges that extend along the Atlantic coast of North America as far north as Nova Scotia. The males in breeding plumage are often highly colorful.

== Taxonomy ==
The genus Setophaga was introduced by the English naturalist William Swainson in 1827. The type species was subsequently designated by Swainson in the same year as the American redstart Setophaga ruticilla. The genus name Setophaga means moth eater in Ancient Greek; from σής : sēs (genitive σητός : sētós), "moth", and φάγος : phágos, "eating".

Traditionally, most members (29 species) of Setophaga were recognized as belonging to the genus Dendroica. The only member of Setophaga was the American redstart. More recent genetic research suggested that Dendroica and Setophaga be merged. This change was accepted by both the North American and South American Classification Committees of the American Ornithological Society and the IOC World Bird List. As the name Setophaga (published in 1827) takes priority over Dendroica (published in 1842), those who accept the merger transferred all Dendroica species to Setophaga.

== History ==
A burst of speciation in Setophaga occurred between 4.5 and 7 million years ago. This time frame roughly corresponds to the transition from the Miocene to the Pliocene period, when an abrupt rise in temperature and the fragmentation of forest habitats in North America may have caused allopatric speciation in the genus. It is widely agreed that this speciation constitutes an adaptive radiation, though recent evidence is mixed, noting that evidence of both adaptive and non-adaptive radiations exists.

Up to several Setophaga species coexist in regions such as northeastern North America. Since these species are strikingly similar in both diet and morphology, this was once thought to be a violation of the laws of evolution. Further study concluded that species coexist through subtle feeding differences due to niche partitioning and diffuse exploitative interspecific competition: rather than compete directly for the same food resources, species utilize slightly different feeding strategies to capture a slightly different set of prey species.

== List of species ==
The genus contains 35 species.

Image	Common name	Scientific name	Distribution
	Adelaide's warbler	Setophaga adelaidae	Puerto Rico
	American redstart	Setophaga ruticilla	southern Canada and the eastern United States
	Mangrove warbler	Setophaga petechia	Mangroves on both the Atlantic and Pacific coasts of tropical America as well as Caribbean islands
	American yellow warbler	Setophaga aestiva	Breeds in North America, winters in Central and South America
	Arrowhead warbler	Setophaga pharetra	Jamaica
	Bahama warbler	Setophaga flavescens	The Bahamas
	Barbuda warbler	Setophaga subita	Barbuda in Antigua and Barbuda
	Bay-breasted warbler	Setophaga castanea	eastern and central Canada, as well as the extreme northern United States., northeastern South America, the Caribbean, and southern Central America
	Blackburnian warbler	Setophaga fusca	southern Canada, westwards to the southern Canadian Prairies, the Great Lakes region and New England, to North Carolina. southern Central America and South America
	Blackpoll warbler	Setophaga striata	northern North America, from Alaska throughout most of Canada, to the Adirondack Mountains of New York as well as New England in the northeastern United States. the Greater Antilles and the northeastern coasts of South America
	Black-throated blue warbler	Setophaga caerulescens	eastern North America, the Caribbean, and Central America
	Black-throated green warbler	Setophaga virens	eastern North America and western Canada and cypress swamps on the southern Atlantic coast. Mexico, Central America, the West Indies and southern Florida
	Black-throated grey warbler	Setophaga nigrescens	from British Columbia to New Mexico, and winters in Mexico and the southwestern United States
	Cape May warbler	Setophaga tigrina	southern Canada, the Great Lakes region, and New England
	Cerulean warbler	Setophaga cerulea	eastern North America, eastern slope of the Andes in South America
	Chestnut-sided warbler	Setophaga pensylvanica	eastern North America and in southern Canada, Central America south to northern Colombia
	Elfin woods warbler	Setophaga angelae	Puerto Rico
	Golden-cheeked warbler	Setophaga chrysoparia	Central Texas
	Grace's warbler	Setophaga graciae	southwestern United States, Mexico, northern Central America
	Hermit warbler	Setophaga occidentalis	west coast of the United States, Mexico and Central America as well as parts of the southern California coast.
	Hooded warbler	Setophaga citrina	eastern United States and into southernmost Canada (Ontario)
	Kirtland's warbler	Setophaga kirtlandii	Great Lakes region of Ontario, Canada and the United States from Wisconsin and Michigan
	Magnolia warbler	Setophaga magnolia	northeastern parts of the US, with states such as Minnesota and Wisconsin, northern parts of Canada, such as in Saskatchewan, Manitoba, Ontario, and Quebec
	Northern parula	Setophaga americana	eastern North America from southern Canada to Florida
	Olive-capped warbler	Setophaga pityophila	Cuba as well as Grand Bahama
	Palm warbler	Setophaga palmarum	Canada and the northeastern United States
	Pine warbler	Setophaga pinus	eastern North America
	Plumbeous warbler	Setophaga plumbea	Dominica and Guadeloupe
	Prairie warbler	Setophaga discolor	northeastern Mexico and islands in the Caribbean
	Saint Lucia warbler	Setophaga delicata	Saint Lucia
	Townsend's warbler	Setophaga townsendi	northwestern coast of North America
	Tropical parula	Setophaga pitiayumi	southernmost Texas and northwest Mexico (Sonora)
	Vitelline warbler	Setophaga vitellina	Cayman Islands and on the Swan Islands in Honduras
	Yellow-rumped warbler (includes Myrtle, Audubon's and Goldman's warblers)	Setophaga coronata	breeds Alaska south to Guatemala and east to northeastern United States, winters in southern United States, Mexico, and western Caribbean
	Yellow-throated warbler	Setophaga dominica	southern Pennsylvania and northern Missouri, to the Gulf of Mexico
