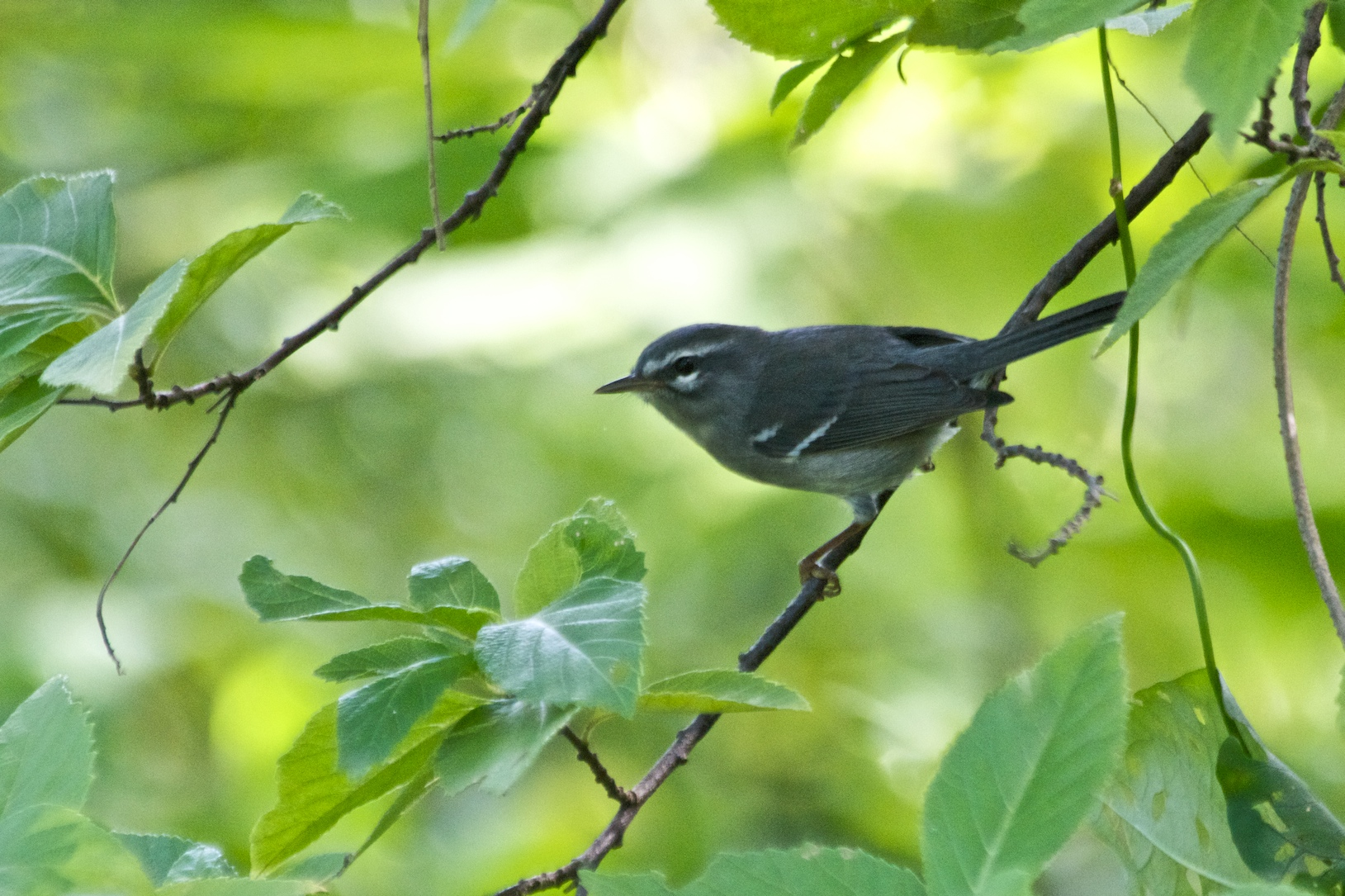

Conservation status
- Least Concern (IUCN 3.1)

Scientific classification
- Kingdom: Animalia
- Phylum: Chordata
- Class: Aves
- Order: Passeriformes
- Family: Parulidae
- Genus: Setophaga
- Species: S. plumbea

Binomial name
- Setophaga plumbea (Lawrence, 1877)

Synonyms
- Dendroica plumbea Lawrence, 1877

= Plumbeous warbler =

Species of bird

The plumbeous warbler (Setophaga plumbea) is a species of passerine bird in the family Parulidae, the New World warblers. It is found in Dominica and Guadeloupe in the Lesser Antilles.

== Taxonomy and systematics ==
The plumbeous warbler was formally described by George Newbold Lawrence in 1877 as Dendroica plumbea with its type locality given as Dominica. Beginning in 2011, taxonomic systems reassigned it to its present genus Setophaga. The plumbeous warbler forms a superspecies with the elfin woods warbler (S. angelae) of Puerto Rico and the arrowhead warbler (S. pharetra) of Jamaica.

The plumbeous warbler is monotypic.

== Etymology ==
The plumbeous warbler's genus Setophaga means "moth eater" in Greek. The specific epithet plumbea is Latin and means "lead-colored".

== Description ==
The plumbeous warbler is 12 to 14 cm (4.7 to 5.5 in) long and weighs 8.4 to 11.3 g (0.30 to 0.40 oz). The sexes have the same plumage. Adults have a mostly gray head with a white supercilium that is broken over the eye and a white arc below the eye. Their upperparts are gray. Their wings are mostly gray with wide white tips on the greater and median coverts that show as two white wing bars. Their tail is mostly gray with a whitish underside and white tips on the outer two pairs of feathers. Their underparts are mostly whitish with grayer flanks. They have a dark iris, a grayish black maxilla, a dark horn mandible, and dusky legs and feet. Immature birds have buffy white facial markings, grayish olive upperparts, buffy wing bars, and buffy white underparts.

== Distribution and habitat ==
The plumbeous warbler is endemic to the Lesser Antilles where it is restricted to Guadeloupe, its two dependencies Marie-Galante and Îles des Saintes, and Dominica. It inhabits humid montane forest, elfin forest, rainforest, low-elevation scrubby forest, and mangroves. In elevation it ranges from sea level to 900 m (3,000 ft).

== Behavior ==
=== Movement ===
The plumbeous warbler is a year-round resident.

=== Feeding ===
The plumbeous warbler feeds primarily on insects and also includes small amounts of berries in its diet. It forages mostly in the understory, gleaning prey from foliage and branches.

=== Breeding ===
The plumbeous warbler's breeding season has not been fully defined but includes March to July. Its nest is a cup made from leaves and rootlets and lined with softer material. It typically is placed in a bush or bromeliad not far above the ground. The clutch is two to three eggs. The incubation period, time to fledging, and details of parental care are not known.

=== Vocalization ===
The plumbeous warbler's song is a "short and simple but quite melodic...pa-pi-a or de-de-diu". Its calls are a "short chek" and a "loud rattle".

== Status ==
The IUCN has assessed the plumbeous warbler as being of Least Concern. It has a small range; its population size is not known but is believed to be stable. No immediate threats have been identified. It is considered "[g]enerally common throughout its limited range".
