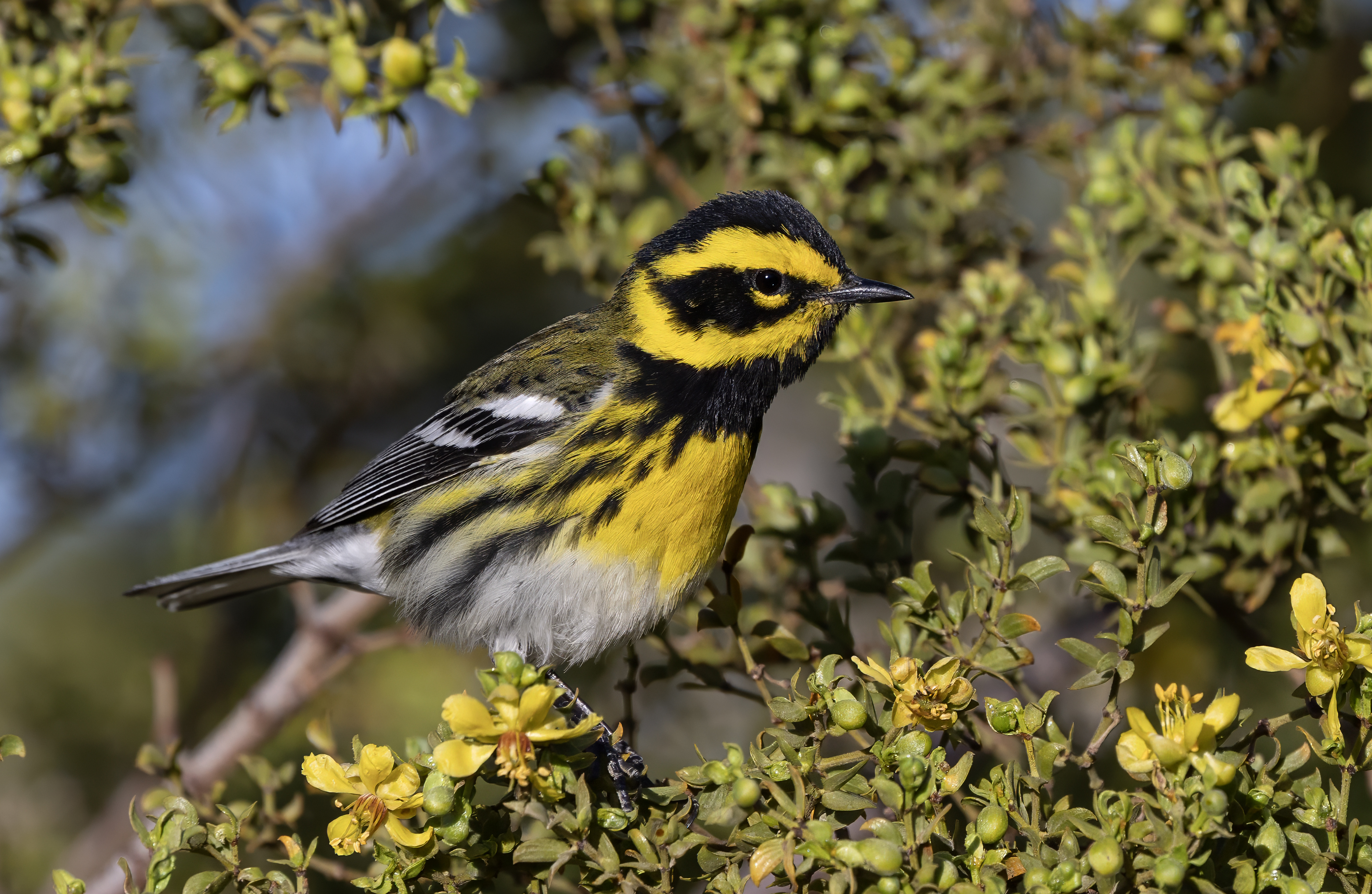

Conservation status
- Least Concern (IUCN 3.1)

Scientific classification
- Kingdom: Animalia
- Phylum: Chordata
- Class: Aves
- Order: Passeriformes
- Family: Parulidae
- Genus: Setophaga
- Species: S. townsendi

Binomial name
- Setophaga townsendi (Townsend, 1837)
- Range of S. townsendi Breeding range Year-round range Wintering range

Synonyms
- Sylvia townsendi (protonym); Dendroica townsendi

= Townsend's warbler =

Species of bird

Townsend's warbler (Setophaga townsendi) is a small songbird of the New World warbler family.

== Taxonomy ==
Townsend's warbler was formally described in 1837 by the American naturalist John Kirk Townsend under the binomial name Sylvia townsendi. The type locality is Fort Vancouver on the Columbia River in the state of Washington. After the merger of the genera Dendroica and Setophaga, Townsend's warbler is now placed in the genus Setophaga that was introduced by the English naturalist William Swainson in 1827. The species is monotypic: no subspecies are recognised.

== Description ==
Townsend's warbler has a yellow face with a black stripe across its cheeks extending into an ear patch, a thin pointed bill, two white wing bars, olive upperparts with black streaks on their backs and flanks, and a white belly. Adult males have a black cap, black throat and yellow lower breast; females have a dark cap and a yellow throat. Immature birds are similar to females with a dark green cap and cheeks.

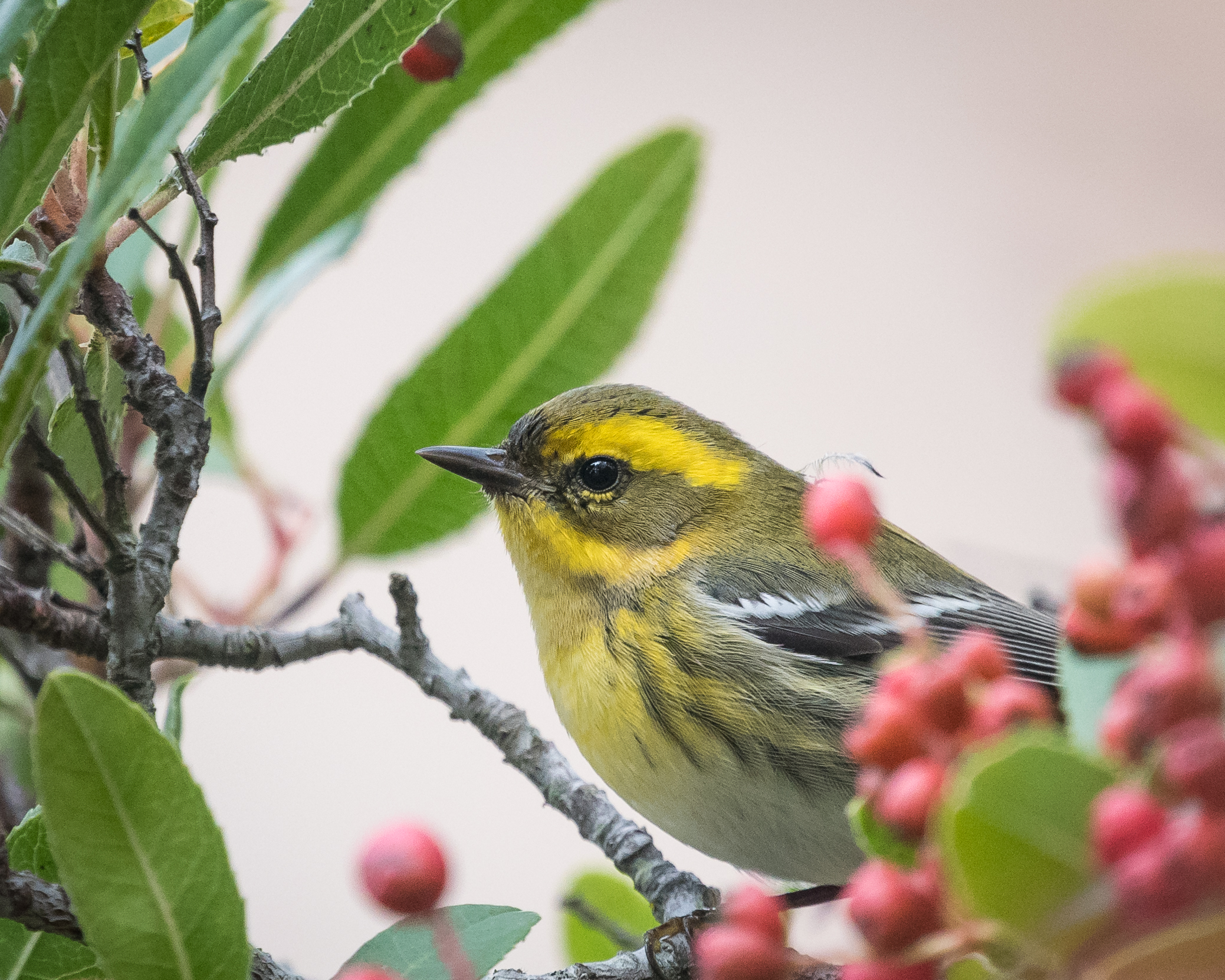
Adult female showing lighter facial markings and yellow throat as opposed to the male's black markings and black throat.

Standard Measurements
| length | 4.5–5 in (110–130 mm) |
| weight | 8.8 g (0.31 oz) |
| wingspan | 8 in (200 mm) |
| wing | 63.1–69.9 mm (2.48–2.75 in) |
| tail | 47.1–54 mm (1.85–2.13 in) |
| culmen | 9.9–10.8 mm (0.39–0.43 in) |
| tarsus | 18.1–19 mm (0.71–0.75 in) |

== Life history ==
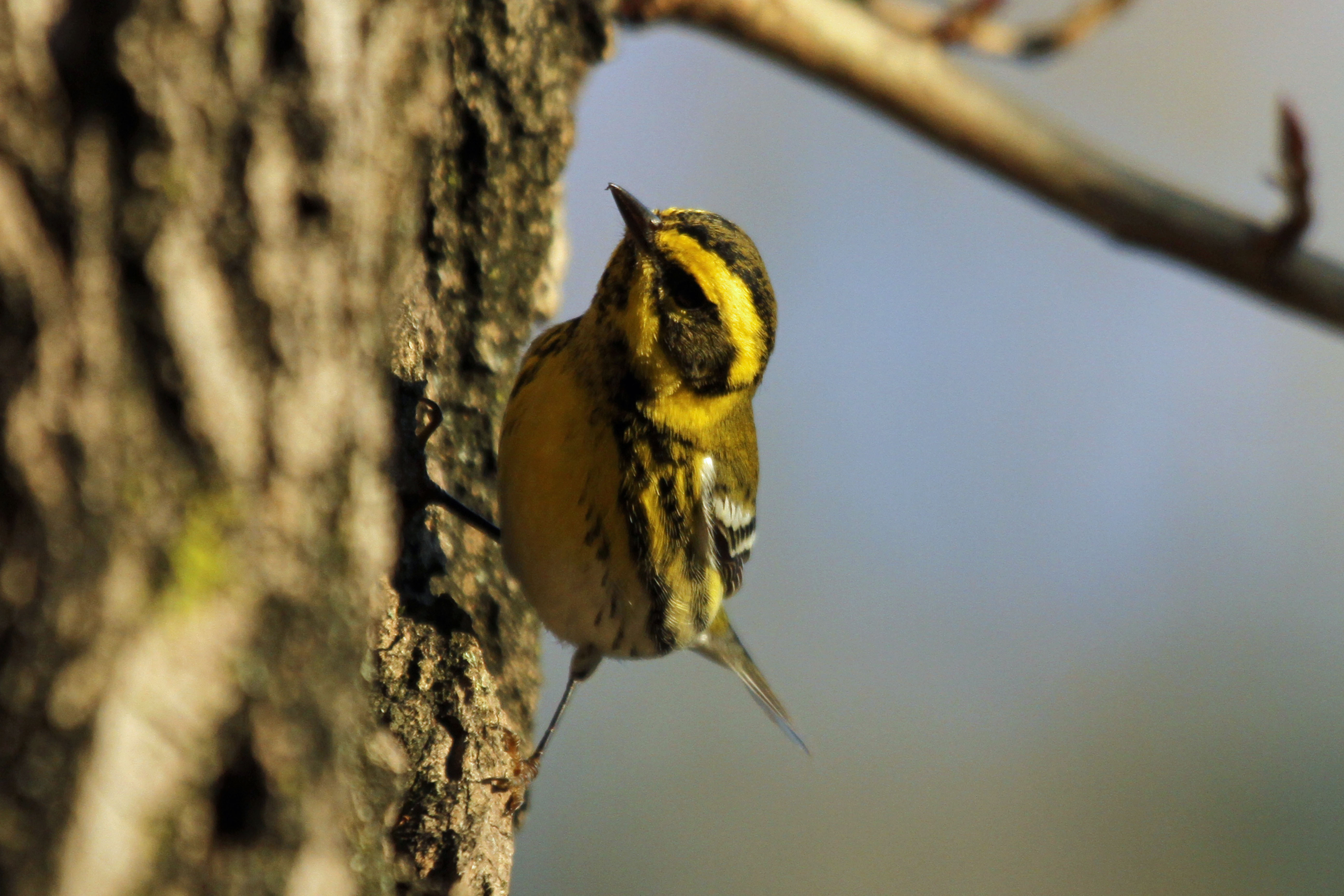
In California, USA

Their breeding habitats are coniferous forests with large trees on the northwestern coast of North America. Their nests are shallow cups built with grass and lined with moss. These nests are usually placed atop a branch in a conifer. The female lays 4 to 5 brown-speckled white eggs.

This bird is closely related to the hermit warbler, and the two species interbreed where their ranges overlap.

Birds from Haida Gwaii migrate short distances further south on the Pacific coast. Other birds winter in Mexico, Central America, and the south-western United States.

They forage actively in the higher branches, often gleaning insects from foliage and sometimes hovering or catching insects in flight. They mainly eat insects, spiders, and seeds. Outside of the nesting season, these birds forage in mixed flocks. In winter, they also eat berries and plant nectar, and honeydew directly from the anus of scale insects.

The song of the male bird is a buzzed zee-zee-zee-bzz-zee or weazy weazy weazy weazy twea, somewhat similar to that of its eastern relative, the black-throated green warbler. The call is a sharp tup.

This bird was named after the American ornithologist, John Kirk Townsend. Although Townsend is also credited with first describing this bird, he used a name chosen by Thomas Nuttall, who was travelling with him, and so sidestepped the convention against naming a species after oneself.
