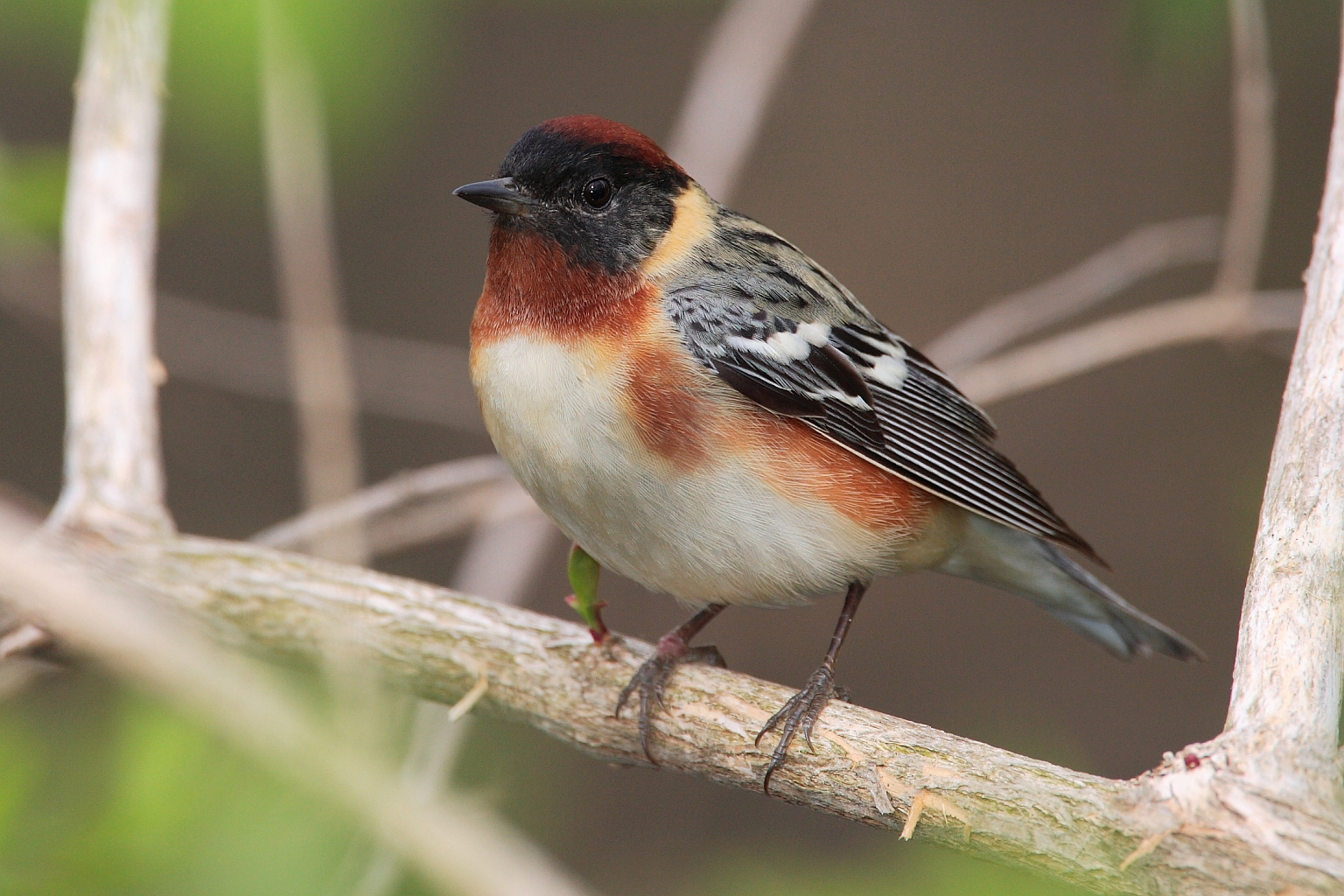
- Adult male in breeding plumage
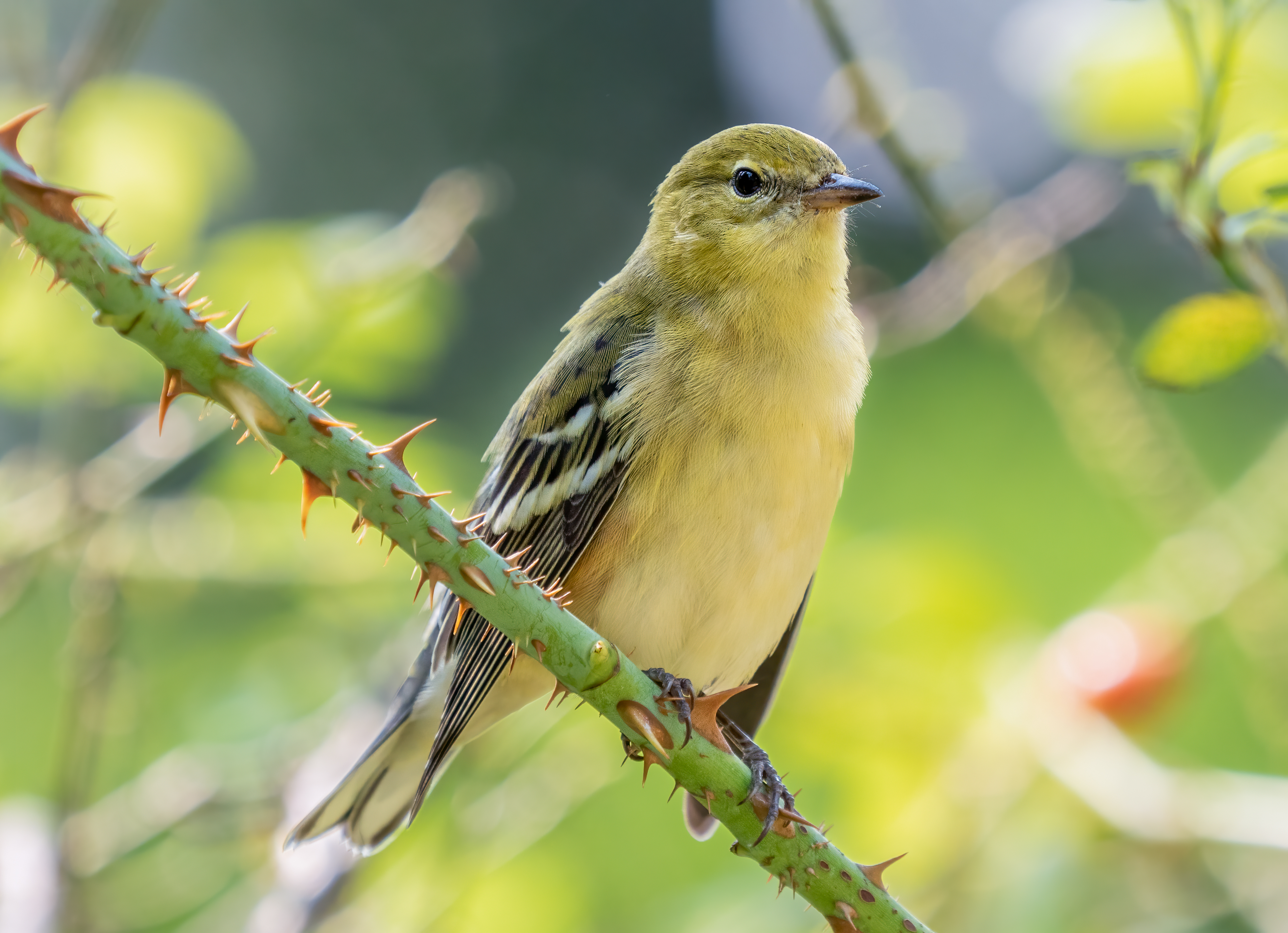
- Adult in nonbreeding plumage

Conservation status
- Least Concern (IUCN 3.1)

Scientific classification
- Kingdom: Animalia
- Phylum: Chordata
- Class: Aves
- Order: Passeriformes
- Family: Parulidae
- Genus: Setophaga
- Species: S. castanea

Binomial name
- Setophaga castanea (Wilson, 1810)
- Range of S. castanea (note: missing distribution in the Caribbean) Breeding range Wintering range

Synonyms
- Dendroica castanea

= Bay-breasted warbler =

Species of bird

The bay-breasted warbler (Setophaga castanea) is a small species of songbird in the New World warbler family, Parulidae. It is one of 35 species in the diverse genus Setophaga. Like all songbirds, or passerines, the species is classified in the order Passeriformes.

== Taxonomy ==
The bay-breasted warbler was formally described and illustrated in 1810 by the American ornithologist Alexander Wilson based on specimens collected in Pennsylvania. Wilson coined the binomial name Sylvia castanea. The specific epithet is Latin meaning "chestnut-coloured". The bay-breasted warbler is now one of over 30 species placed in the genus Setophaga that was introduced by the English naturalist William Swainson in 1827. The species is monotypic, with no subspecies accepted. The genus name Setophaga combines the Ancient Greek σης/sēs, σητος/sētos meaning "moth" with -φαγος/-phagos meaning "-eating".

== Description ==
Adult males in breeding plumage are primarily greyish above, with two white wing bars, dark streaks on the back, and a creamy neck patch. The face is black, and the crown, throat, and sides are a dark chestnut colour. Breeding females are similar in overall pattern to the males, but are paler and duller. In the nonbreeding season, both sexes gain olive-green feathers on the back, nape, and head. The rufous on the flanks is limited and may even fade away entirely in nonbreeding females. The two white wing bars are present in all plumages.

In breeding plumage, the bay-breasted warbler may be confused with the chestnut-sided warbler (Setophaga pensylvanica), which has similar chestnut colour on the sides. Chestnut-sided warblers may be easily differentiated by the extent of the chestnut, which does not reach the throat or crown. Chestnut-sided warblers also have a bright yellow crown, dark mask, and white cheek and throat in breeding plumage. In fall, nonbreeding bay-breasted warblers may look very similar to the blackpoll warbler (Setophaga striata). However, blackpoll warblers never have a hint of chestnut colour on the flanks, and also have yellowish feet, unlike the black feet of the bay-breasted warbler. Due to this similarity, the two birds sometimes are collectively called "baypoll warblers".

=== Measurements ===
Standard Measurements
length	14 cm (5.5 in)
weight	10.7–15.1 g (0.38–0.53 oz)
wingspan	23 cm (9 in)
wing, male	70–78 mm (2.8–3.1 in)
wing, female	67–74 mm (2.6–2.9 in)
tail, male	48–56.4 mm (1.89–2.22 in)
tail, female	48–52.8 mm (1.89–2.08 in)
culmen, male	10–11 mm (0.39–0.43 in)
culmen, female	9.4–10.5 mm (0.37–0.41 in)
tarsus, male	17.5–20.3 mm (0.69–0.80 in)
tarsus, female	17.5–19.5 mm (0.69–0.77 in)

== Distribution ==
Bay-breasted warblers breed in the boreal spruce-fir forests of eastern and central Canada (Newfoundland, west to northeastern British Columbia), as well as the far northeast of the United States. The species winters in the wet lowland forests of northeastern South America, the Caribbean, and southern Central America, and may be seen during spring and fall migration across the eastern half of the United States in a variety of vegetative communities. Many individuals cross the Gulf of Mexico on their long-distance migration, although some travel north and south along the Mexican shore. It is a rare vagrant west to the west coast of North America, and has also been recorded in Greenland.

== Behaviour and ecology ==
=== Food and feeding ===
In the breeding season, bay-breasted warblers feed primarily on insects and spiders, especially the spruce budworm (Choristoneura fumiferana). These are gleaned from vegetation, never caught on the wing. To avoid competition with similar species, bay-breasted warblers concentrate their foraging on the breeding grounds to the interior middle portions of coniferous trees. On wintering grounds in the tropics, fruit forms a majority of the diet. Wintering bay-breasted warblers often form mixed-species flocks with other neotropical migrants and resident species. These flocks seek food in the forest canopy, and the bay-breasted warbler is often an aggressive member of the unit, bullying smaller species from potential food sources.

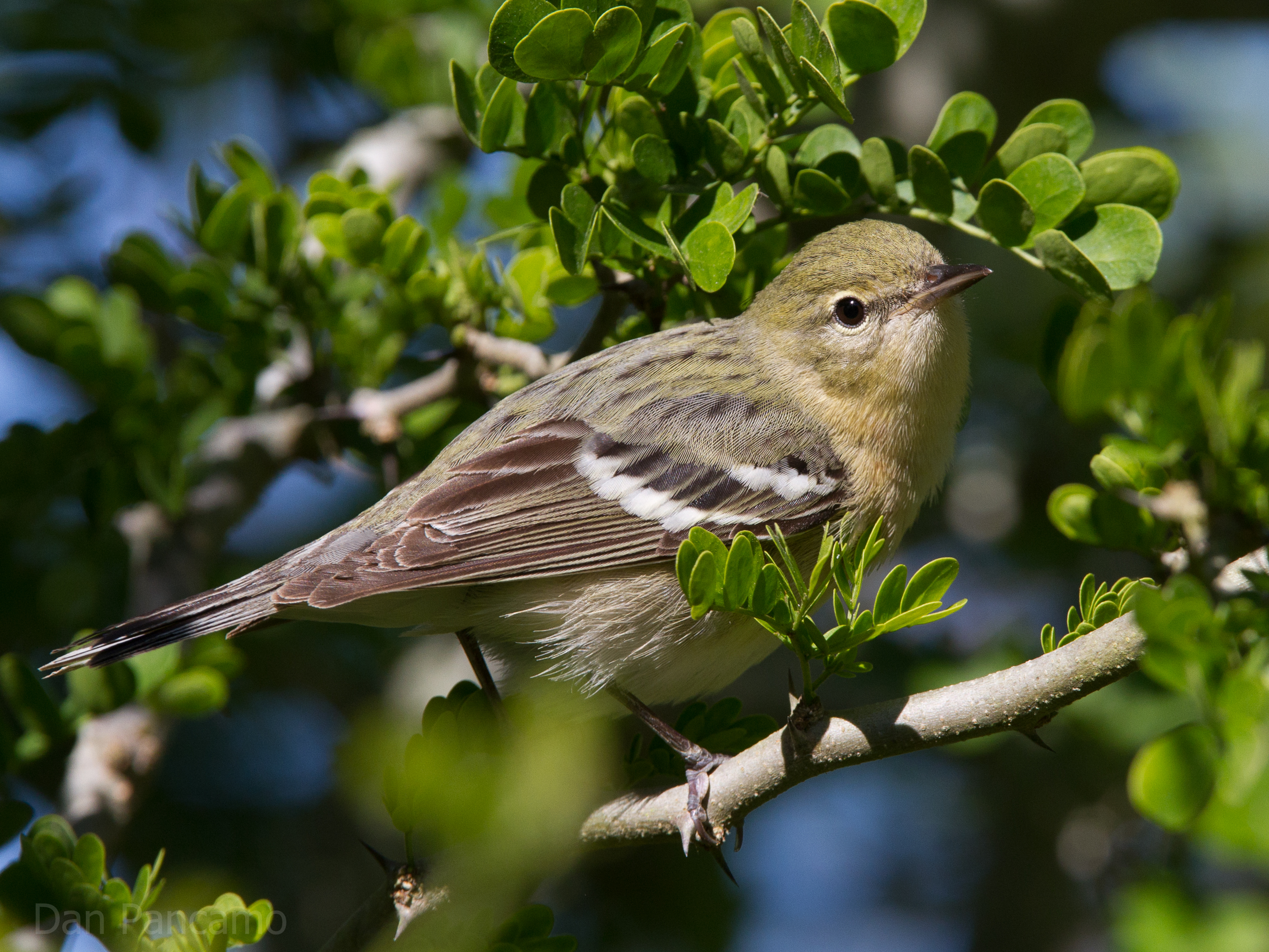
Female

=== Breeding ===
Nests are typically constructed in the lower portion of a spruce or fir tree. The nest is cup-shaped and primarily composed of plant material, with spider silk often utilized as well. Average clutch size is 4–7 whitish eggs with dark spots. The young are altricial at birth, with limited down.

== Conservation ==
The bay-breasted warbler is currently classified by the IUCN as least concern, with an increasing population. Historically, though, the species has been slowly declining, with a loss of insect prey and global climate change contributing factors to decline. The global population is estimated to be 9.9 million mature individuals.
