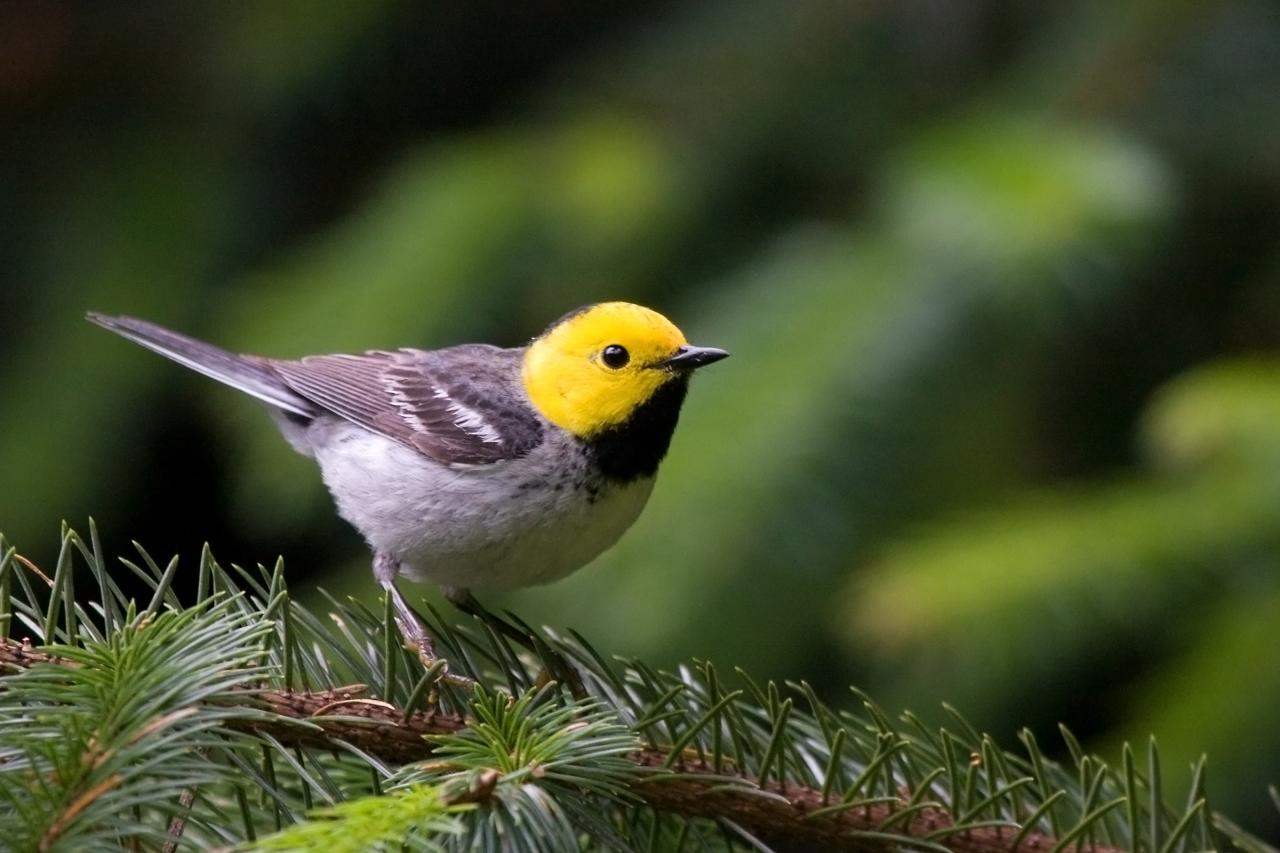

Conservation status
- Least Concern (IUCN 3.1)

Scientific classification
- Kingdom: Animalia
- Phylum: Chordata
- Class: Aves
- Order: Passeriformes
- Family: Parulidae
- Genus: Setophaga
- Species: S. occidentalis

Binomial name
- Setophaga occidentalis (Townsend, 1837)
- Range of S. occidentalis Breeding range Winter range

Synonyms
- Dendroica occidentalis Townsend, 1837; Dendroica niveiventris Salvin, 1863

= Hermit warbler =

Species of bird

The hermit warbler (Setophaga occidentalis) is a small perching bird. It is a species of New World warbler or wood-warbler. They are a migratory bird, the breeding range spanning the majority of the west coast of the United States. Their winter range includes parts of Mexico and Central America as well as parts of the southern California coast.

== Description ==
Hermit warblers are dark gray in coloration on top, and white below, and their flanks are streaked with black. The wings have two diagonal white wing bars. The majority of the hermit warbler's head is yellow, and males have a dark black throat, while females have much less black on their throat bib and immature birds have no black throat. Both males and females measure 5.5 inches (14 cm) in length, 0.3 to 0.5 oz (8.5 to 14.2 g) in weight, and 7.9 in (20 cm) in wingspan.

== Behavior ==
=== Diet ===
Like most warblers the hermit warbler eats a strict diet of insects and spiders, and can often be found hanging upside-down from the ends of conifer branches, like a chickadee, probing for food.

=== Reproduction ===
Nests are neat and cup-shaped, constructed from stems, grass, twigs, and pine needles positioned near the tip of a branch high in a conifer tree. The female will lay between three and five eggs, which are white in color and heavily spotted with brown and lilac speckles. Other incubation habits are mostly unknown.

== Habitat ==
Hermit warblers are common, but incredibly shy, birds that dwell in open coniferous forests. They are also found in wetter habitats for nesting, and in various mountain habitats. Their summer breeding range is the majority of the west coast of the United States up to Washington. They will sometimes winter in south-west California, but they are migratory and will winter in Central America as far south as Panama. Other nesting habits are mostly unknown. During migration they can be found in both coniferous and deciduous habitats as well as water lined wooded areas, desert oases, and in suburban areas. You can usually find these birds in Tall Coniferous forest, Douglas fir, Pine, Redwood, and in the mountain like areas.

=== Effects of climate change ===
The range of the hermit warbler is expected to change as the climate warms, the breeding range expected to expand north and east but lose much of the current range in Northern California as well as some range in parts of Oregon, Washington, and Canada. Extreme warming will put them at risk of heat waves as well as flooding during the nesting season.
