= Flora of the Dominican Republic =

The Dominican Republic is home to thousands of plant species.

== Selected species ==
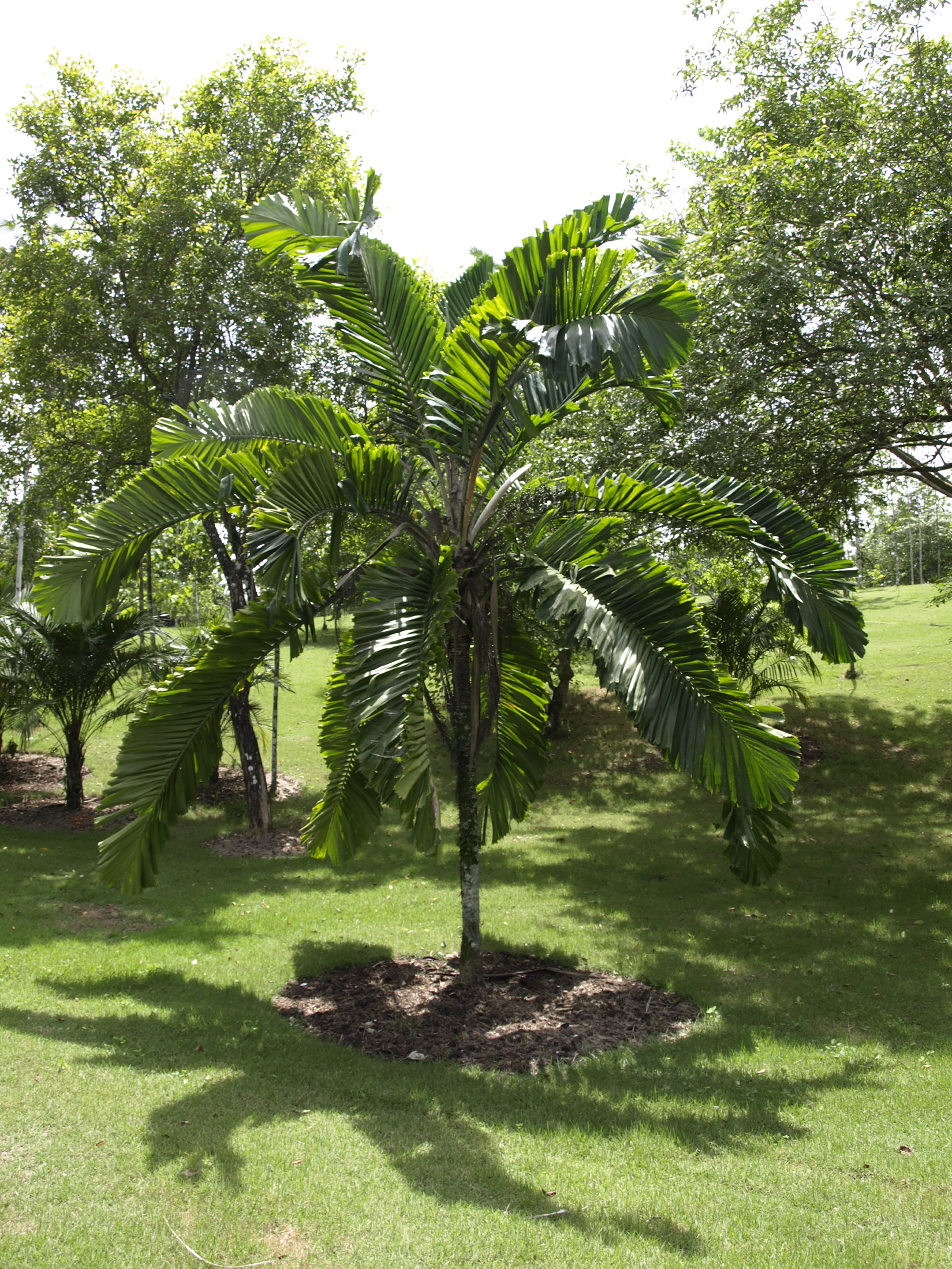
Aiphanes minima in Santo Domingo

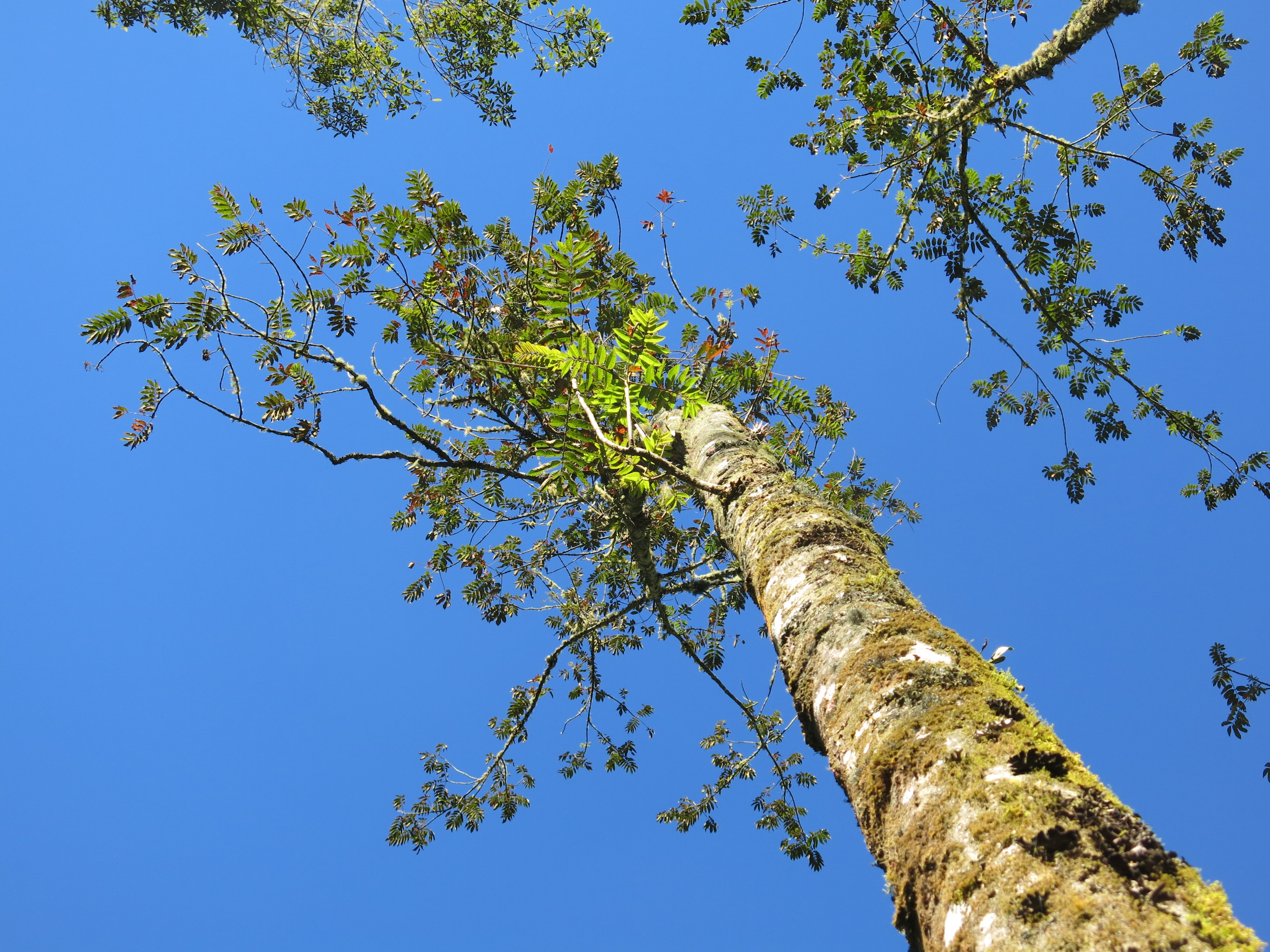
Brunellia comocladifolia in Sierra de Bahoruco National Park

- Abatia angeliana
- Acrocomia aculeata
- Agave americans var. franzosinii
- Agave antillarum
- Agave brevipetala
- Agave brevispina
- Agave intermixta
- Agave sisalana
- Aiphanes minima
- Alchornea latifolia
- Alsophila brooksii
- Azara dentata
- Alzatea verticillata
- Akrosida floribunda
- Amyris elemifera
- Anadenanthera peregrina
- Andira inermis
- Annona muricata
- Annona reticulata
- Annona squamosa
- Ardisia escallonioides
- Aralia excelsa
- Attalea brasiliensis
- Aulacomnium palustre
- Avicennia germinans
- Bactris plumeriana
- Begonia domingensis
- Bonellia umbellata
- Bixa orellana
- Boerhavia diffusa
- Brunellia comocladifolia
- Buddleja domingensis
- Buchenavia capitata
- Burmannia capitata
- Bursera simaruba
- Byrsonima crassifolia
- Calotropis procera
- Calyptronoma rivalis
- Canna indica
- Canella winterana
- Capparis indica
- Carica papaya
- Carapa guianensis
- Carpotroche platyptera
- Cassytha filiformis
- Catalpa brevipes
- Cecropia glazioui
- Cedrela odorata
- Ceiba pentandra
- Celtis trinervia
- Chrysophyllum argenteum
- Chrysophyllum cainito
- Chrysophyllum oliviforme
- Cirsium mexicanum
- Cissus trifoliata
- Citharexylum fruticosa
- Citrus limetta – sweet lemon
- Citrus × lumia 'pyriformis' - Citrus lumia Risso. & Poit., or Citrus aurantiifolia (Christm. et Panz.) Swingle var. lumia hor, Lumia (citrus)
- Citrus medica
- Claoxylon sandwicense
- Cleome gynandra
- Clusia rosea
- Coccoloba diversifolia
- Coccoloba krugii
- Coccoloba microstachya
- Coccoloba pubescens
- Coccoloba swartzii
- Coccoloba uvifera
- Cocos nucifera
- Coccothrinax argentea
- Coccothrinax boschiana
- Coccothrinax ekmanii
- Coccothrinax fragrans
- Coccothrinax gracilis
- Coccothrinax jimenezii
- Coccothrinax montana
- Coccothrinax scoparia
- Coccothrinax spissa
- Colubrina asiatica
- Colubrina elliptica
- Comocladia dodonaea
- Conocarpus erectus
- Consolea moniliformis
- Copernica ceifera
- Cordia alliodora
- Cordia sebestena
- Cordia sulcata
- Crescentia cujete
- Croton barahonensis
- Croton ciliatoglandulifer
- Croton eluteria
- Croton punctatus
- Cubanola domingensis
- Curatella americana
- Cyathea abbottii
- Cyathea balanocarpa
- Cyathea brooksii
- Cyathea crassa
- Cyathea fulgens
- Cynophalla flexuosa
- Cynophalla hastata
- Cyrilla racemiflora
- Dendropanax arboreus
- Dendropanax selleanus
- Dichaea muricata
- Didymopanax morototoni
- Domingoa haematochila
- Domingoa nodosa
- Domingoa × susiana
- Dorstenia erythranda
- Dorstenia peltata
- Eugenia foetida
- Eugenia sprengelii
- Ficus americana
- Ficus aurea
- Ficus citrifolia
- Ficus maxima
- Forestiera segregata
- Frodinia tremula
- Fuchsia hybrida
- Fuchsia triphylla
- Furcraea tuberosa
- Garrya elliptica
- Garrya fadyenii
- Gaussia attenuata
- Genipa americana
- Geonoma undata
- Ginoria buchii
- Goeppertia allouia
- Guaiacum officinale
- Guaiacum sanctum
- Guazuma ulmifolia
- Guzmania berteroniana
- Guzmania monostachia
- Gymnanthes lucida
- Harrisia divaricata
- Hippomane spinosa
- Homalopetalum leochilus
- Hymenaea courbaril
- Hymenaea protera
- Hymenocallis latifolia
- Inga laurina
- Ipomoea corymbosa
- Ipomoea purpurea
- Jacaranda caerulea
- Jacquinia berteroi
- Jaltomata antillana
- Jatropha curcas
- Jatropha integerrima
- Jupunba abbottii
- Jupunba glauca
- Juglans jamaicensis
- Juniperus gracilior
- Krugiodendron ferreum
- Laguncularia racemosa
- Lagetta lagetto
- Lantana camara
- Leucothrinax morrisii
- Libidibia coriaria
- Lilaeopsis schaffneriana
- Lippia alba
- Maclura tinctoria
- Magnolia domingensis
- Magnolia emarginata
- Magnolia hamorii
- Magnolia pallescens
- Mammea americana
- Manilkara bidentata
- Manilkara jaimiqui
- Manilkara valenzuelana
- Melocactus lemairei
- Mesosphaerum suaveolens
- Mora abbottii
- Morisonia cynophallophora
- Muntingia calabura
- Musa × paradisiaca - Guineos, Musa
- Myrciaria floribunda
- Nelumbo lutea
- Nicotiana tabacum
- Opuntia stricta
- Oreopanax capitatus
- Ottoschulzia rhodoxylon
- Ovieda spinosa
- Pectis glaucescens
- Peperomia alata
- Peperomia obtusifolia
- Pereskia quisqueyana - Leuenbergeria quisqueyana
- Petitia domingensis
- Petrea volubilis
- Phyla dulcis - Lippia dulcis
- Picardaea haitiensis
- Picrasma excelsa
- Picrodendron baccatum
- Pimenta haitiensis
- Pineda incana
- Pinguicula casabitoana
- Pinus occidentalis
- Pleopeltis murorum
- Plumeria rubra
- Plural hogberries
- Podostemum ceratophyllum
- Podocarpus aristulatus
- Podocarpus buchii
- Podocarpus hispaniolensis
- Prestoea acuminata - Prestoea
- Prestoea acuminata var. montana
- Prestoea montana
- Pradosia spinosa
- Prunus occidentalis
- Pseudophoenix ekmanii
- Pseudophoenix sargentii
- Pseudophoenix vinifera
- Psidium acranthum
- Psidium amplexicaule
- Psidium guajava
- Psidium nannophyllum
- Psidium salutare
- Psychilis bifida
- Psychilis buchii
- Psychilis cogniauxii
- Psychilis dodii
- Psychilis domingensis
- Psychilis olivacea
- Psychilis rubeniana
- Psychilis × tudiana
- Psychilis vernicosa
- Pterocarpus officinalis
- Randia aculeata
- Reinhardtia paiewonskiana
- Rhizophora mangle
- Roystonea borinquena
- Roystonea regia
- Rhytidophyllum leucomallon
- Sabal causiarum
- Sabal domingensis
- Samyda dodecandra
- Schaefferia frutescens
- Selenicereus grandiflorus
- Senna domingensis
- Sideroxylon anomalum
- Sideroxylon dominicanum
- Sideroxylon obovatum
- Sideroxylon rubiginosum
- Sideroxylon salicifolium
- Sloanea berteroana
- Sloanea caribaea
- Solanum mammosum
- Specklinia tribuloides
- Spondias mombin
- Stenostomum radiatum
- Swietenia mahagoni
- Tabebuia heterophylla
- Tabebuia maxonii
- Talinum paniculatum
- Tecoma stans
- Terminalia buceras
- Thespesia grandiflora
- Theophrasta jussieui
- Thrinax radiata
- Tillandsia fendleri
- Tillandsia variabilis
- Trema micranthum
- Utricularia jamesoniana
- Utricularia juncea
- Utricularia pusilla
- Vallisneria americana
- Varronia polycephala
- Vitis tiliifolia
- Ximenia americana
- Zamia pumila
- Zombia antillarum
- Zanthoxylum flavum
- Zanthoxylum martinicense
- Zanthoxylum punctatum
