= List of trees of the Caribbean =

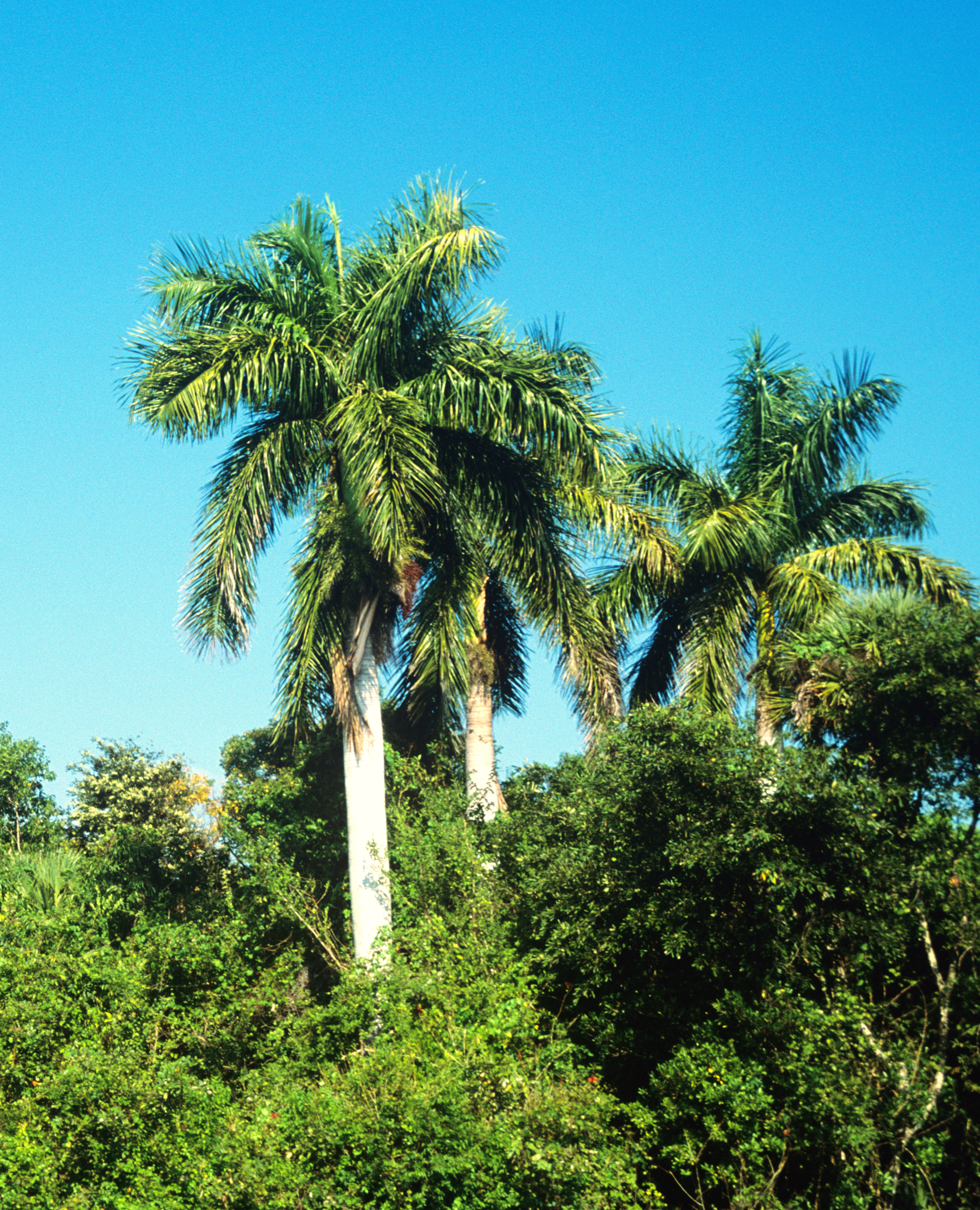
Roystonea regia

Prior to European settlement, the Caribbean was dominated by forested ecosystems. The insular Caribbean has been considered a biodiversity hotspot. Although species diversity is lower than on mainland systems, endemism is high.

Species diversity is highest and endemism is lowest in Trinidad, which has a predominantly continental flora. Endemism is highest in Cuba and Hispaniola, the largest members of the Greater Antilles.

== List of species ==
=== Native species ===
==== Acanthaceae ====
- Avicennia germinans

==== Anacardiaceae ====
- Comocladia dodonaea
- Spondias mombin

==== Annonaceae ====
- Annona trinitensis
- Duguetia
  - Duguetia lucida
  - Duguetia tobagensis
- Rollinia
  - Rollinia mucosa
  - Rollinia exsucca

==== Apocynaceae ====
- Plumeria rubra

==== Araliaceae ====
- Aralia
  - Aralia excelsa
  - Aralia rex
- Dendropanax
  - Dendropanax arboreus
  - Dendropanax blakeanus
  - Dendropanax cordifolius
  - Dendropanax cuneifolius
  - Dendropanax elongatus
  - Dendropanax filipes
  - Dendropanax grandiflorus
  - Dendropanax grandis
  - Dendropanax laurifolius
  - Dendropanax nervosus
  - Dendropanax nutans
  - Dendropanax oblanceatus
  - Dendropanax pendulus
  - Dendropanax portlandianus
  - Dendropanax selleanus
  - Dendropanax swartzii
- Didymopanax
  - Didymopanax morototoni – Cuba, Hispaniola, Puerto Rico, Leeward Islands, and Trinidad. Introduced to Windward Islands
- Frodinia
  - Frodinia gleasonii – Puerto Rico
  - Frodinia tremula – Hispaniola
- Oreopanax
  - Oreopanax capitatus
  - Oreopanax dussii
  - Oreopanax ramosissimus
- Sciodaphyllum
  - Sciodaphyllum attenuatum – Leeward Islands and Windward Islands
  - Sciodaphyllum glabratum – Trinidad
  - Sciodaphyllum brownei – Jamaica
  - Sciodaphyllum troyanum – Jamaica
  - Sciodaphyllum urbanianum – Martinique

==== Bignoniaceae ====
- Catalpa longissima
- Crescentia
  - Crescentia cujete (Calabash)
  - Crescentia portoricensis
- Tabebuia
  - Tabebuia heterophylla
  - Tabebuia rosea
- Tecoma stans

==== Bombacaceae ====
- Ceiba pentandra (kapok tree)
- Ochroma pyramidale

==== Boraginaceae ====
- Bourreria succulenta
- Cordia
  - Cordia alliodora
  - Cordia sulcata
- Rochefortia acanthophora

==== Burseraceae ====
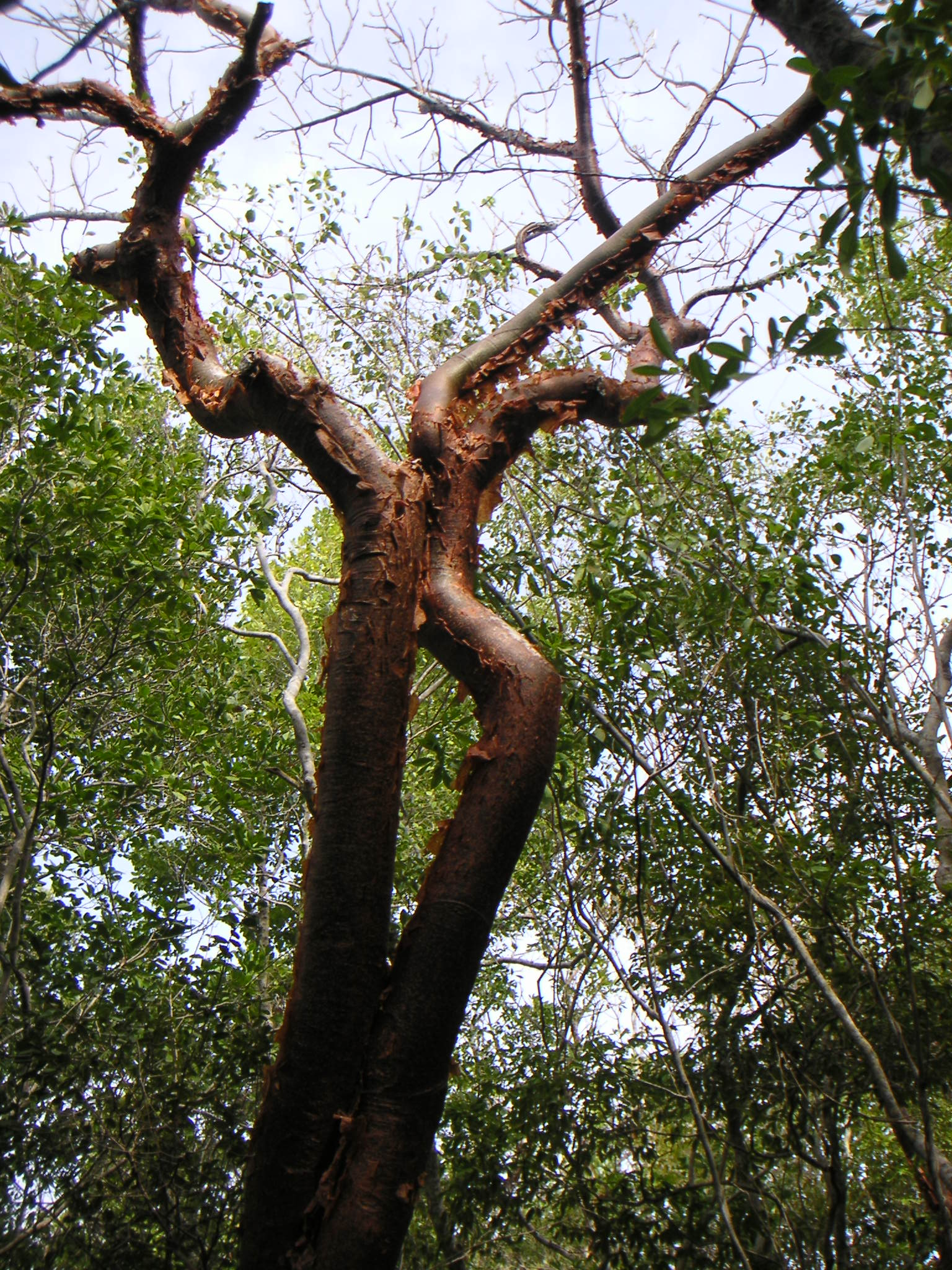
Bursera simaruba

- Dacryodes excelsa (Tabonuco)
- Bursera simaruba

==== Buxaceae ====
- Buxus
  - Buxus aneura
  - Buxus brevipes
  - Buxus crassifolia
  - Buxus ekmanii
  - Buxus excisa
  - Buxus heterophylla
  - Buxus imbricata
  - Buxus muelleriana
  - Buxus olivacea
  - Buxus pilosula
  - Buxus portoricensis
  - Buxus rheedioides
  - Buxus vahlii

==== Canellaceae ====
- Canella winteriana

==== Cannabaceae ====
- Celtis trinervia - Hispaniola

==== Capparidaceae ====
- Capparis
  - Capparis baducca
  - Capparis cynophallophora
  - Capparis flexuosa
  - Capparis hastata
  - Capparis indica

==== Celastraceae ====
- Cassine xylocarpa
- Gyminda latifolia
- Maytenus
  - Maytenus monticola
  - Maytenus reflex
- Schaefferia frutescens

==== Clusiaceae ====
- Calophyllum
  - Calophyllum calaba
  - Calophyllum lucidum
- Clusia
  - Clusia aripoensis
  - Clusia intertexta
  - Clusia minor
  - Clusia rosea
  - Clusia tocuchensis
- Mammea americana

==== Combretaceae ====
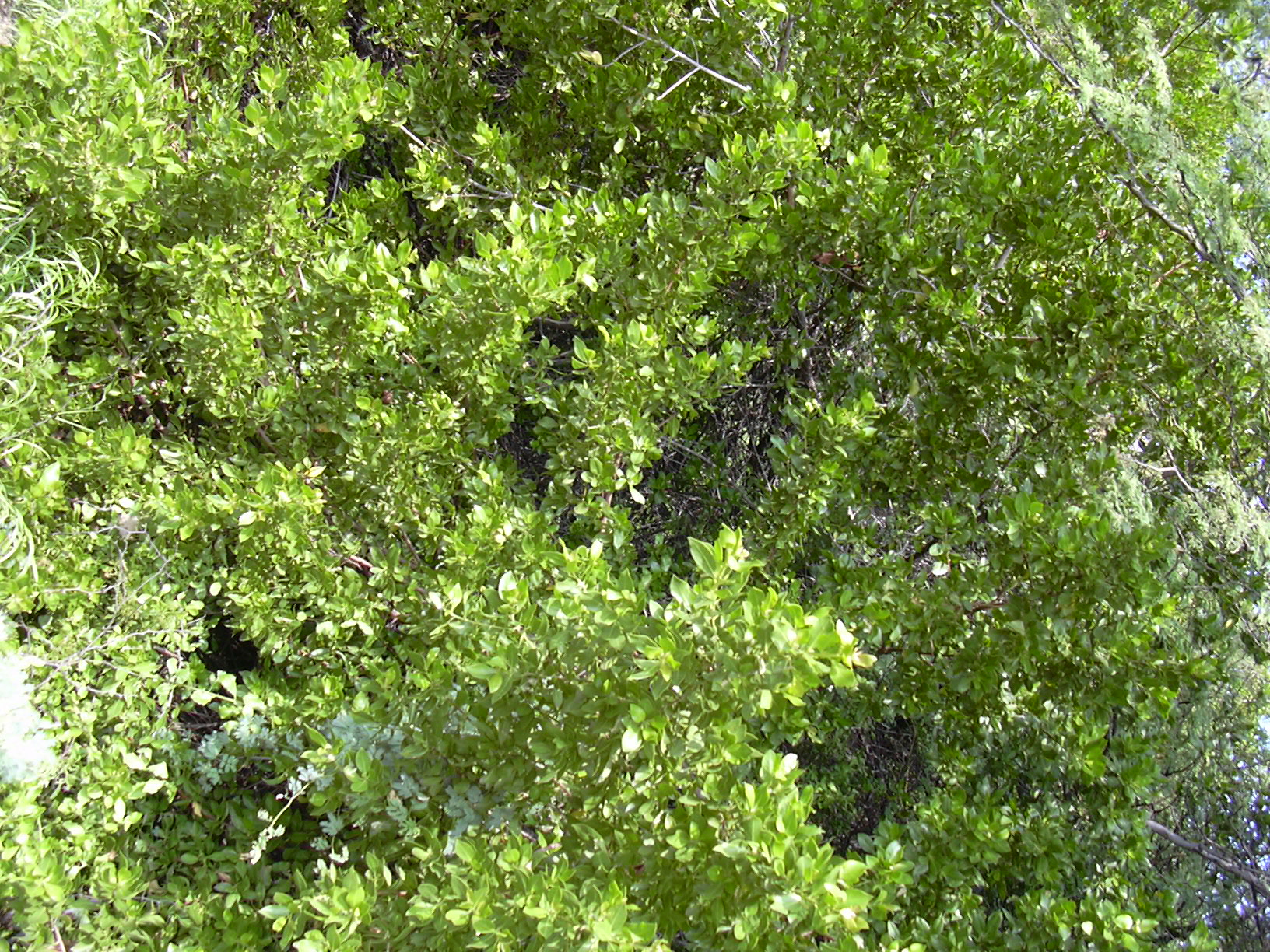
Conocarpus erectus

- Buchenavia tetraphylla
- Bucida buceras
- Conocarpus erectus (Buttonwood)
- Laguncularia racemosa
- Terminalia amazonia

==== Cupressaceae ====
- Juniperus barbadensis
- Juniperus gracilior
- Juniperus saxicola

==== Cyrillaceae ====
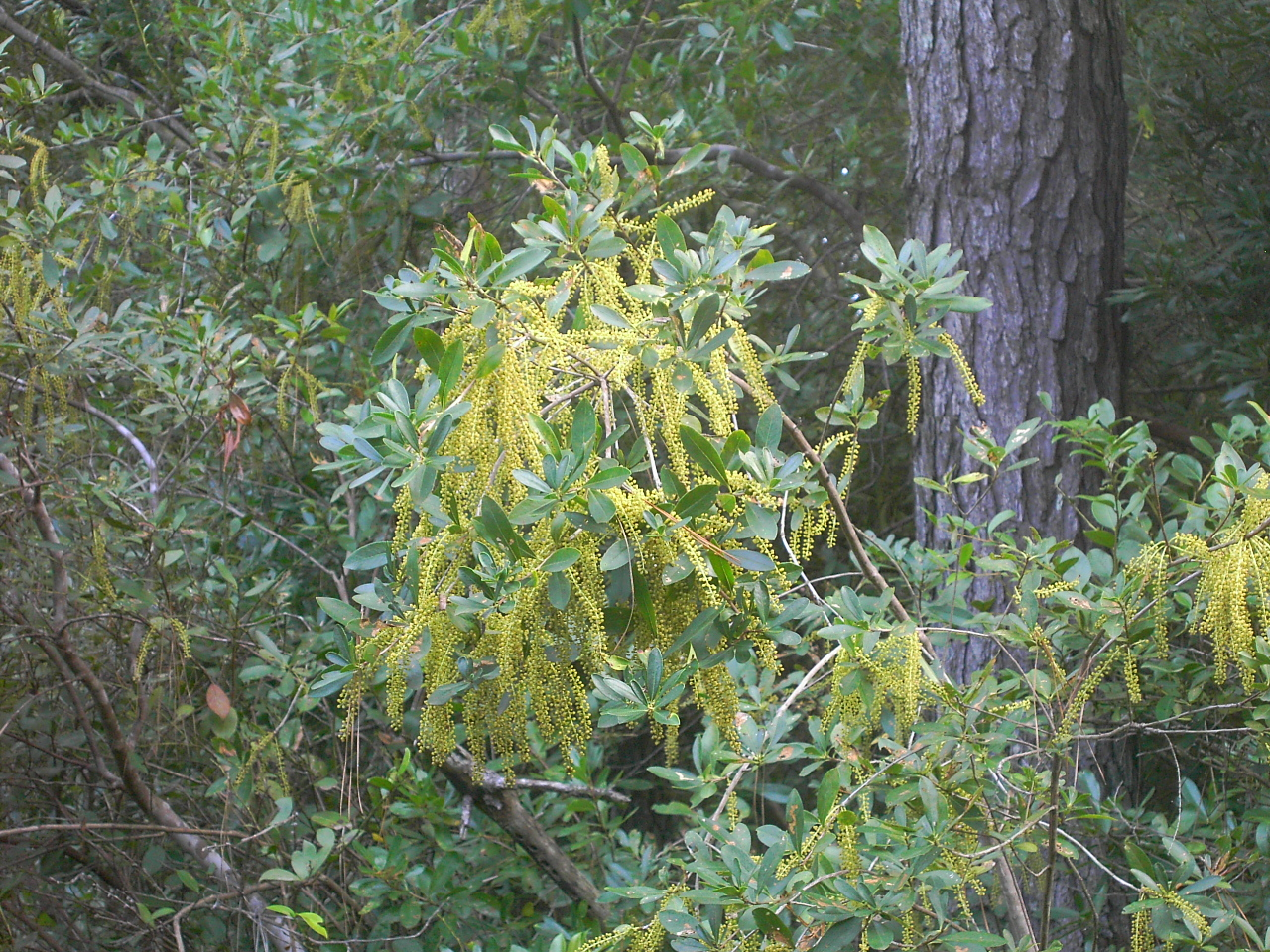
Cyrilla racemiflora

- Cyrilla racemiflora

==== Dilleniaceae ====
- Curatella americana

==== Elaeocarpaceae ====
- Muntingia calabura
- Sloanea berteroana
- Sloanea caribaea

==== Erythroxylaceae ====
- Erythroxylum
  - Erythroxylum areolatum
  - Erythroxylum brevipes
  - Erythroxylum rotundifolium
  - Erythroxylum urbanii

==== Euphorbiaceae ====
- Adelia rincinella
- Alchornea latifolia
- Bernardia dichotoma
- Fluggea acidoton
- Gymnanthes lucida
- Hura crepitans
- Jatropha hernandiifolia
- Picrodendron baccatum
- Savia sessiliflora

==== Fabaceae ====
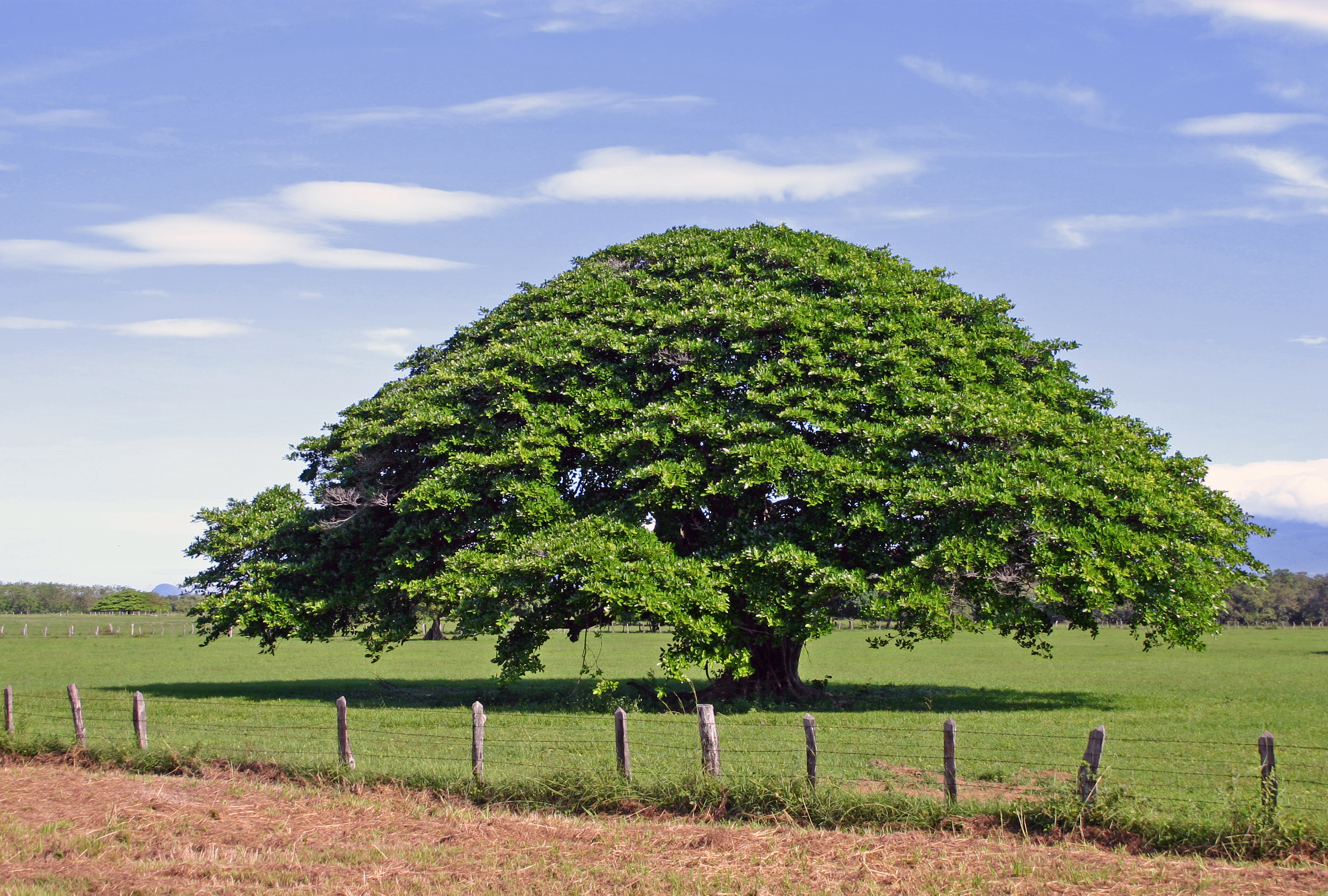
Enterolobium cyclocarpum

- Andira inermis
- Caesalpinia coriaria
- Enterolobium cyclocarpum
- Hymenaea courbaril
- Inga
  - Inga fagifolia
  - Inga vera
- Mora excelsa
- Ormosia krugii
- Pictetia aculeata
- Piscidia carthagenensis
- Pithecellobium unguis-cati
- Pterocarpus officinalis

==== Flacourtiaceae ====
- Samyda dodecandra
- Xylosoma buxifolia

==== Garryaceae ====
- Garrya fadyenii

==== Hernandiaceae ====
- Hernandia sonora

==== Juglandaceae ====
- Juglans jamaicensis

==== Lecythidaceae ====
- Eschweilera subglandulosa

==== Malpighiaceae ====
- Byrsonima
  - Byrsonima crassifolia
  - Byrsonima spicata

==== Malvaceae ====
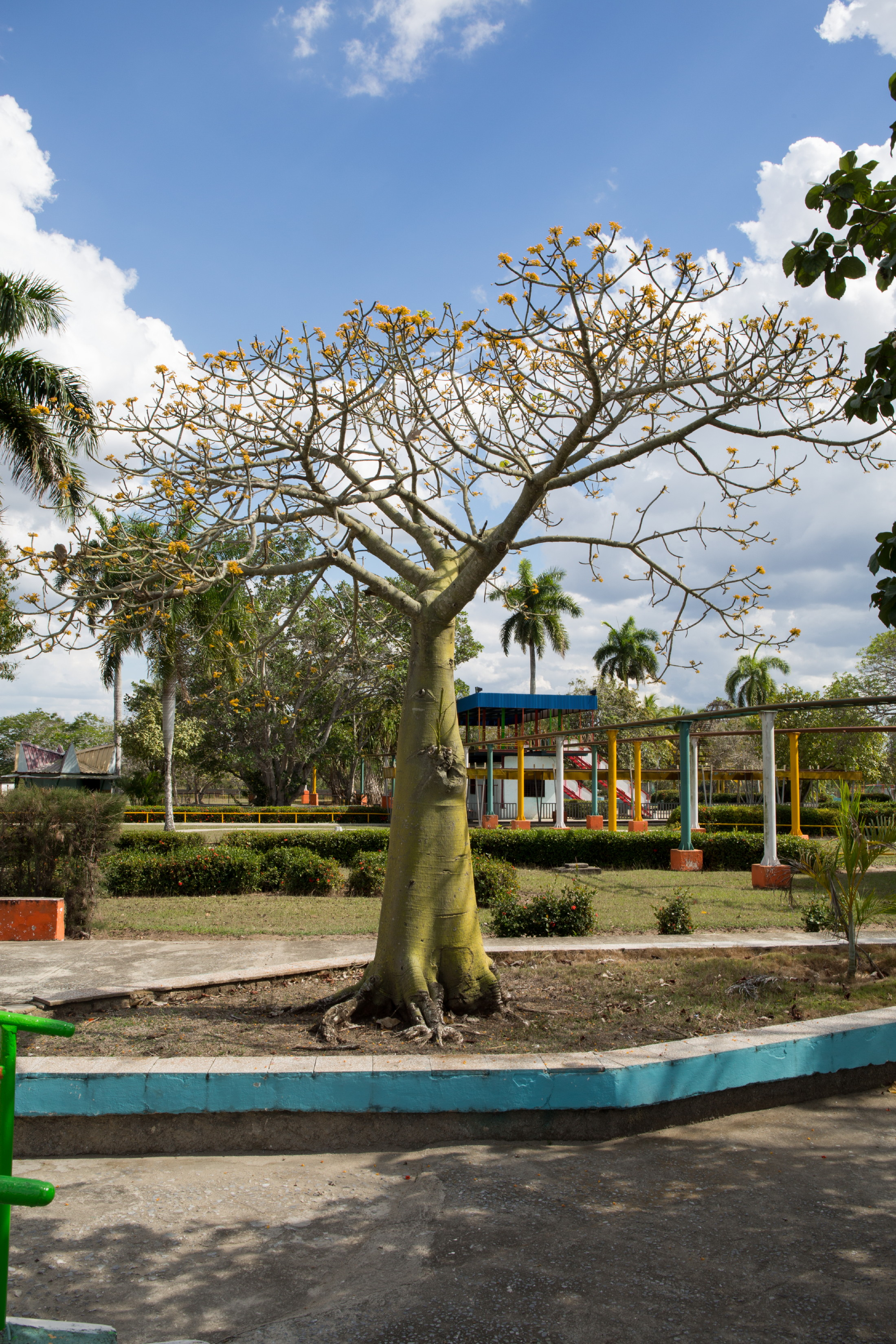
Hildegardia cubensis

- Hibiscus elatus (blue mahoe)
- Hildegardia cubensis
- Thespesia grandiflora

==== Magnoliaceae ====
- Magnolia
  - Magnolia cristalensis
  - Magnolia cubensis
  - Magnolia dealbata
  - Magnolia domingensis
  - Magnolia ekmanii
  - Magnolia emarginata
  - Magnolia hamorii
  - Magnolia minor
  - Magnolia pallescens
  - Magnolia portoricensis
  - Magnolia splendens

==== Meliaceae ====
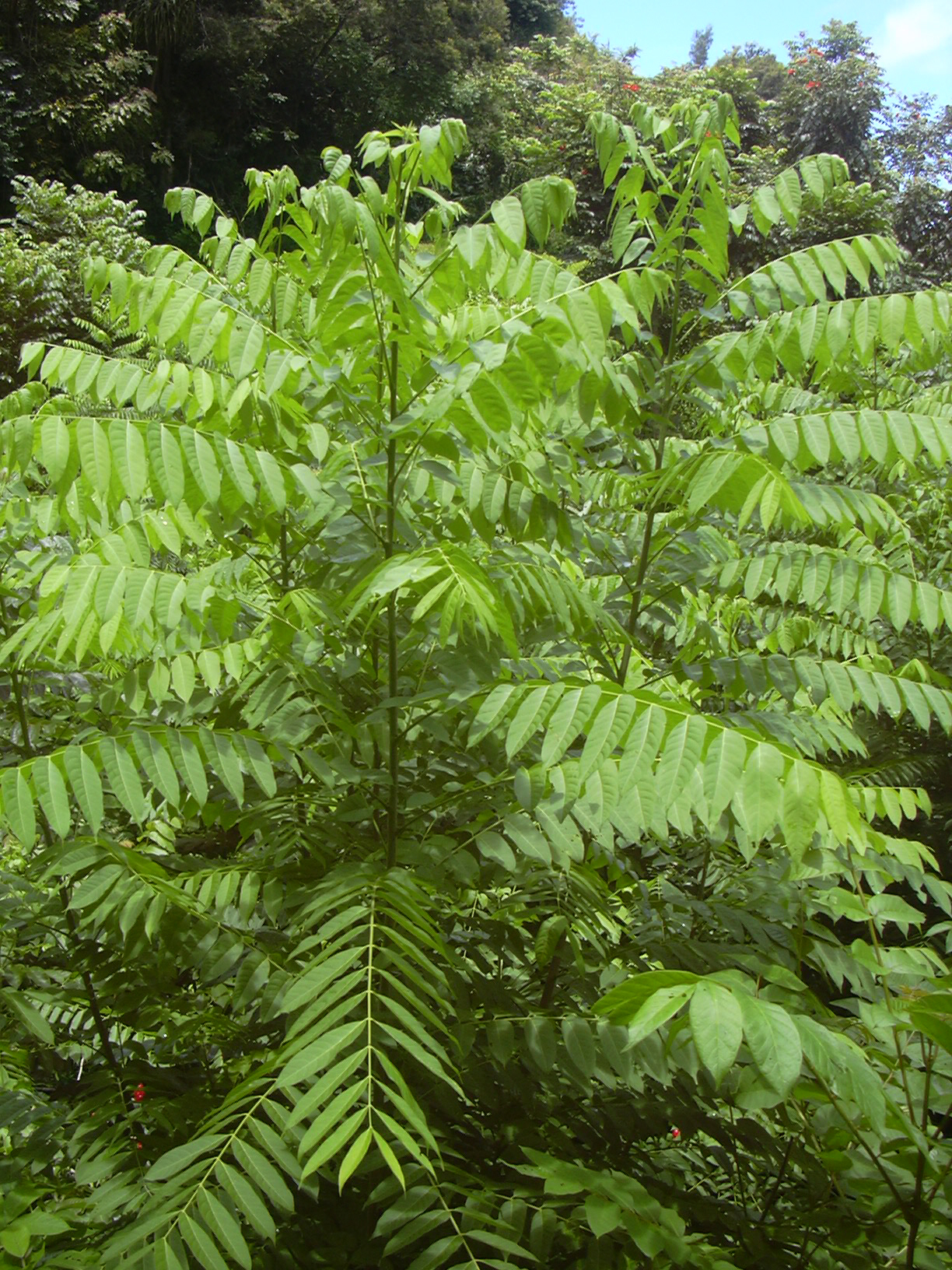
Cedrela odorata

- Carapa
  - Carapa guianensis
- Cedrela odorata
- Guarea
  - Guarea guidonia
- Swietenia mahagoni (West Indian Mahogany)
- Trichilia
  - Trichilia hirta
  - Trichilia triacantha

==== Moraceae ====
- Cecropia
  - Cecropia peltata
  - Cecropia schreberiana
- Ficus
  - Ficus americana
  - Ficus aurea
  - Ficus citrifolia
  - Ficus maxima
- Maclura tinctoria

==== Myrtaceae ====
- Eugenia
  - Eugenia axillaris
  - Eugenia biflora
  - Eugenia cruegeri
  - Eugenia foetida
  - Eugenia lingustrina
  - Eugenia monticola
  - Eugenia procera
  - Eugenia rhombea
  - Eugenia woodburyana
  - Eugenia xerophytica
  - Myrciaria floribunda
- Psidium
  - Psidium amplexicaule
  - Psidium guajava (Guava)

==== Nyctaginaceae ====
- Guapira fragrans
- Neea buxifolia
- Pisonia
  - Pisonia aculeata
  - Pisonia albida
  - Pisonia subcordata

==== Oleaceae ====
- Forestiera segregata
- Ximenia americana

==== Pinaceae ====
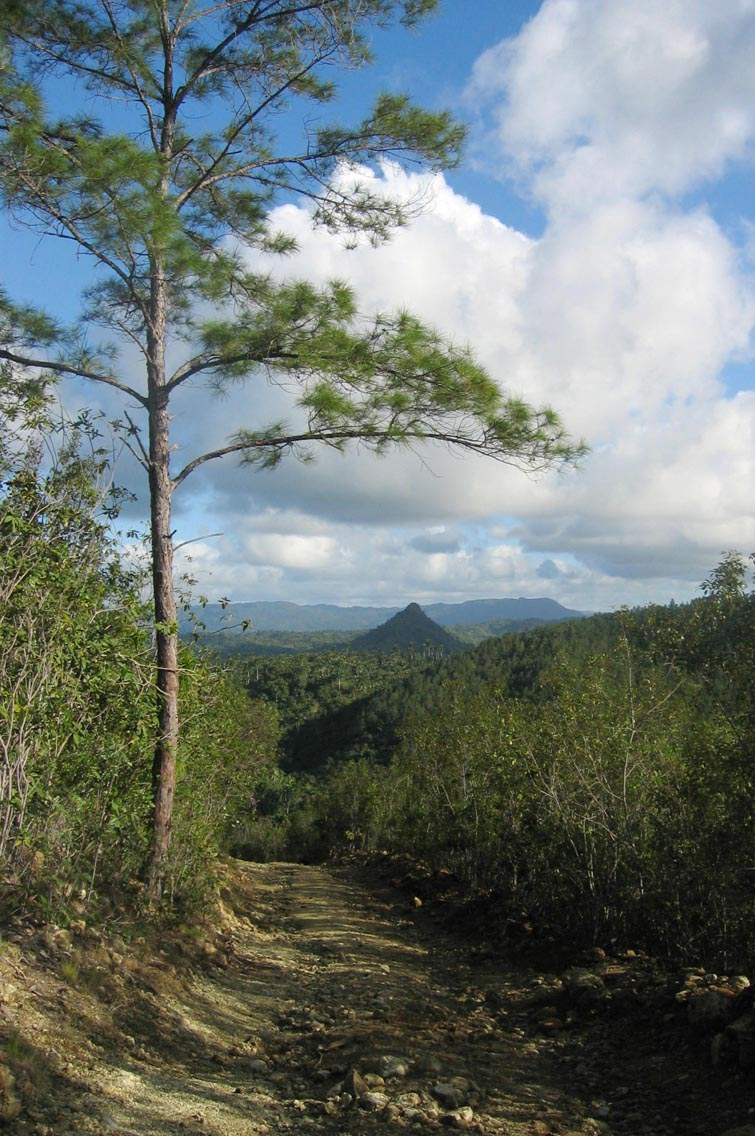
Pinus cubensis

- Pinus
  - Pinus caribaea
  - Pinus cubensis
  - Pinus occidentalis
  - Pinus tropicalis

==== Podocarpaceae ====
- Podocarpus
  - Podocarpus angustifolius
  - Podocarpus aristulatus
  - Podocarpus coriaceus
  - Podocarpus ekmanii
  - Podocarpus hispaniolensis
  - Podocarpus purdieanus
  - Podocarpus trinitensis
  - Podocarpus urbanii
  - Podocarpus victorinianus

==== Polygonaceae ====
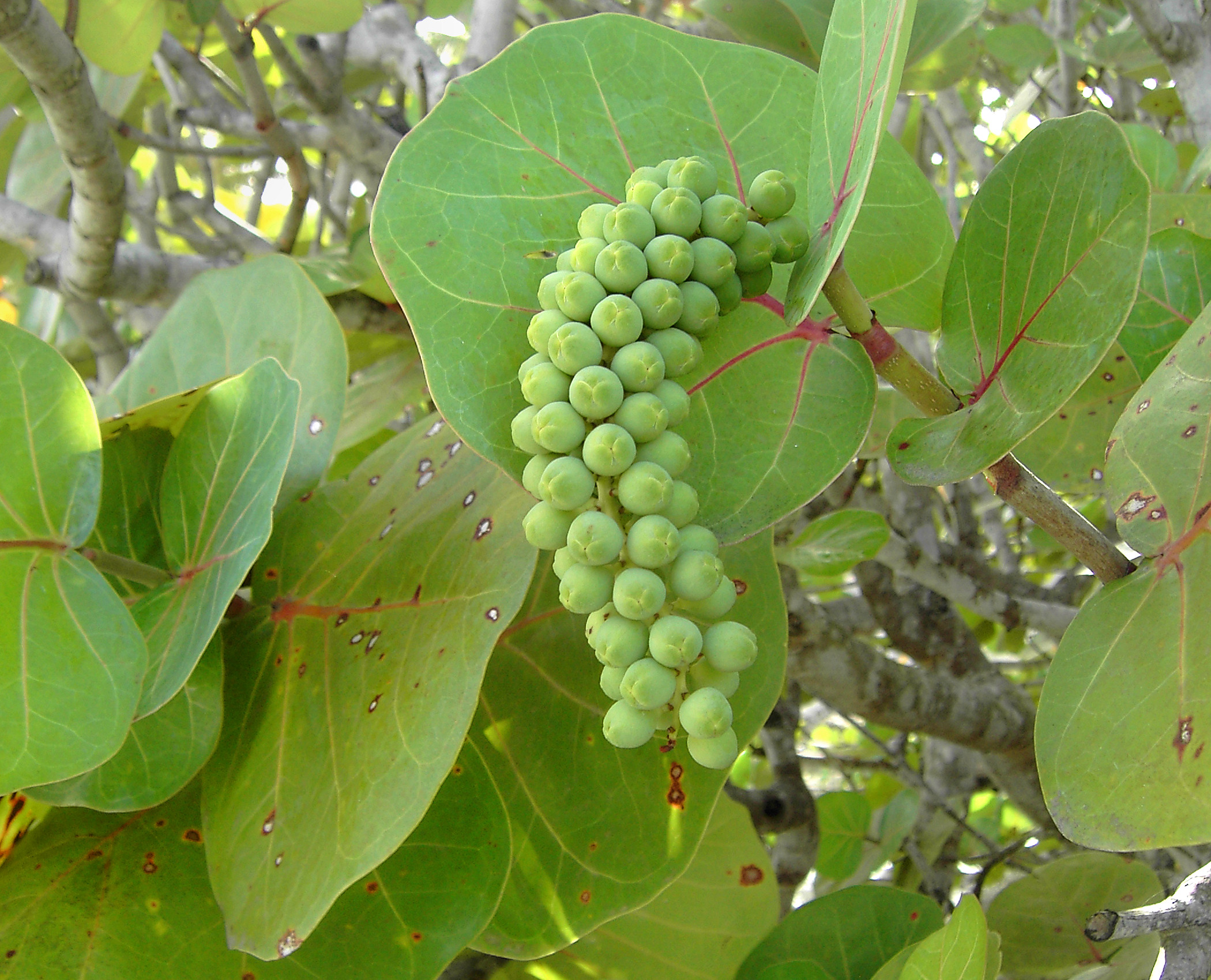
Coccoloba uvifera

- Coccoloba
  - Coccoloba diversifolia
  - Coccoloba krugii
  - Coccoloba microstachya
  - Coccoloba swartzii
  - Coccoloba uvifera (Sea grape)

==== Rhamnaceae ====
- Colubrina
  - Colubrina arborescens
  - Colubrina elliptica
- Reynosia
  - Reynosia guama
  - Reynosia uncinata
- Krugiodendron ferreum
- Ziziphus reticulata

==== Rhizophoraceae ====
Rhizophora mangle

- Rhizophora mangle

==== Rosaceae ====
- Prunus occidentalis

==== Rubiaceae ====
- Antirhea
  - Antirhea acutata
  - Antirhea lucida
- Erithalis fruticosa
- Exostema caribaeum
- Genipa americana
- Guettarda
  - Guettarda elliptica
  - Guettarda krugii
  - Guettarda odorata
- Randia
  - Randia aculeata
  - Randia portoricensis
- Rondelita inermis

==== Rutaceae ====
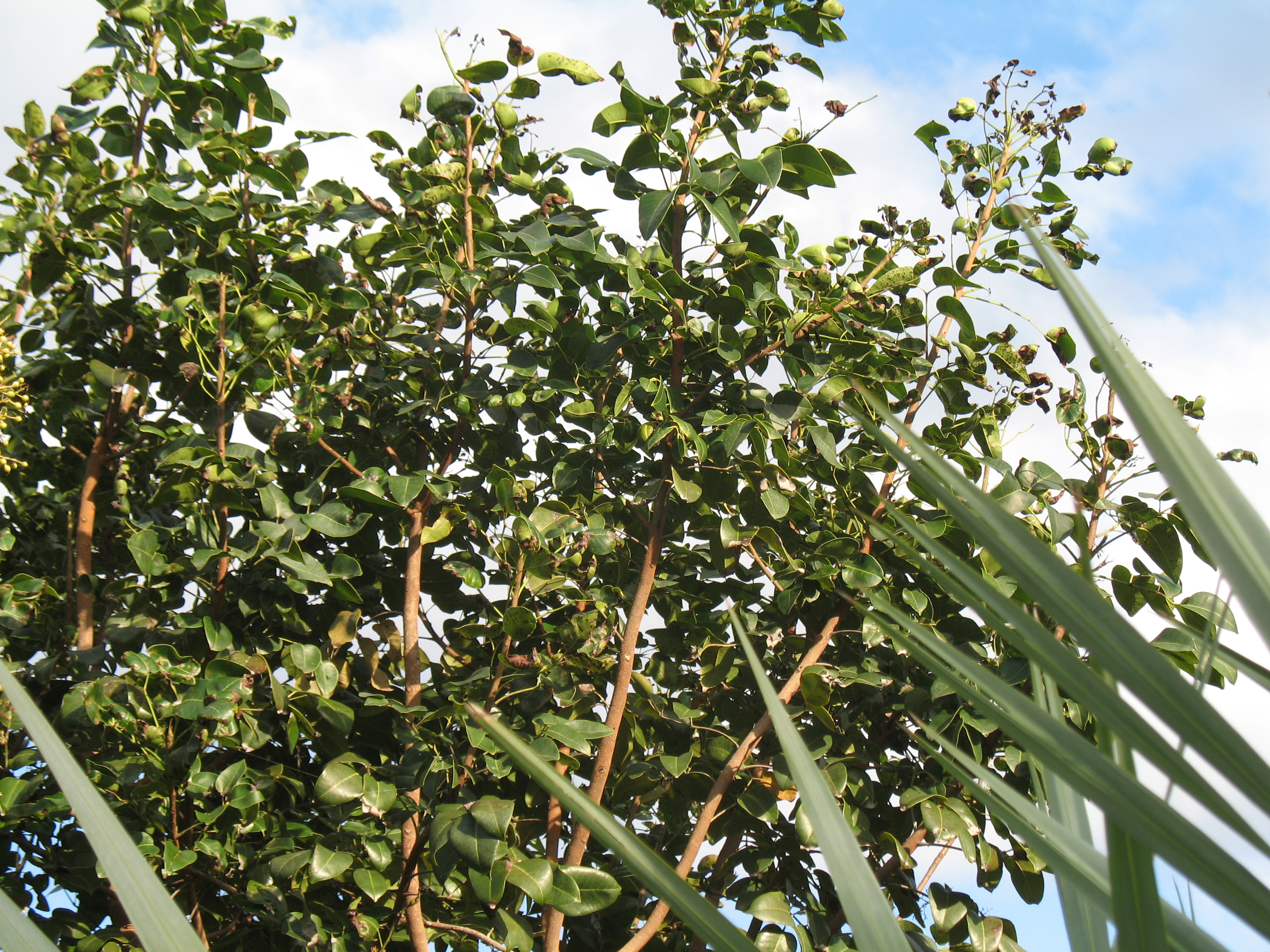
Amyris elemifera

- Amyris
  - Amyris balsamifera
  - Amyris elemifera
- Zanthoxylum
  - Zanthoxylum flavum
  - Zanthoxylum martinicense
  - Zanthoxylum monophyllum
  - Zanthoxylum spinifex
  - Zanthoxylum thomasianum

==== Sapindaceae ====
- Cupania americana
- Melicoccus bijugatus
- Thouinia striata

==== Sapotaceae ====
- Chrysophyllum
  - Chrysophyllum argenteum
  - Chrysophyllum cainito
  - Chrysophyllum oliviforme
  - Chrysophyllum pauciflorum
- Manilkara
  - Manilkara bidentata
  - Manilkara excisa
  - Manilkara gonavensis
  - Manilkara jaimiqui
  - Manilkara mayarensis
  - Manilkara pleeana
  - Manilkara sideroxylon
  - Manilkara valenzuelana
- Micropholis
  - Micropholis chrysophylloides
- Pouteria
  - Pouteria multiflora
  - Pouteria sapota–Mamey sapote
- Pradosia
- Sideroxylon
  - Sideroxylon obovatum
  - Sideroxylon salicifolium

==== Sterculiaceae ====
- Guazuma ulmifolia

==== Theophrastaceae ====
- Jacquinia
  - Jacquinia armillaris
  - Jacquinia berteroi
  - Jacquinia umbellata

==== Verbenaceae ====
- Citharexylum fruticosa
- Petitia domingensis

==== Zamiaceae ====
- Zamia
  - Zamia amblyphyllidia
  - Zamia portoricensis
  - Zamia pumila (Coontie)

==== Zygophyllaceae ====
- Guaiacum
  - Guaiacum officinale (Lignum vitae)
  - Guaiacum sanctum

=== Non-native species ===
==== Anacardiaceae ====
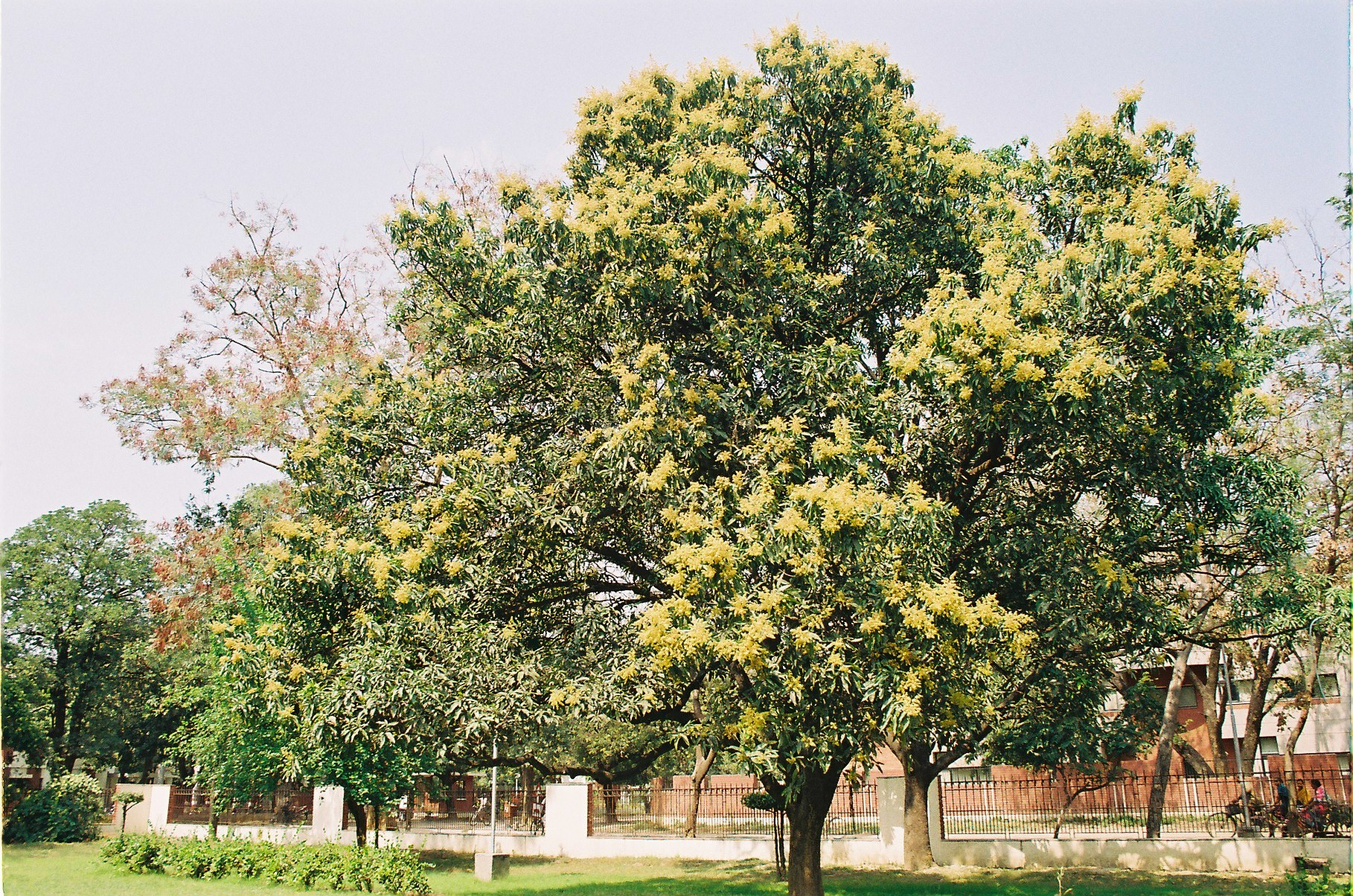
Mangifera indica

- Mango (Mangifera indica)

==== Arecaceae ====
- Coconut (Cocos nucifera)

==== Bignoniaceae ====
- Jacaranda (Jacaranda spp.)

==== Casuarinaceae ====
- Casuarina equisetifolia

==== Combretaceae ====
- Indian almond (Terminalia catappa)

==== Fabaceae ====
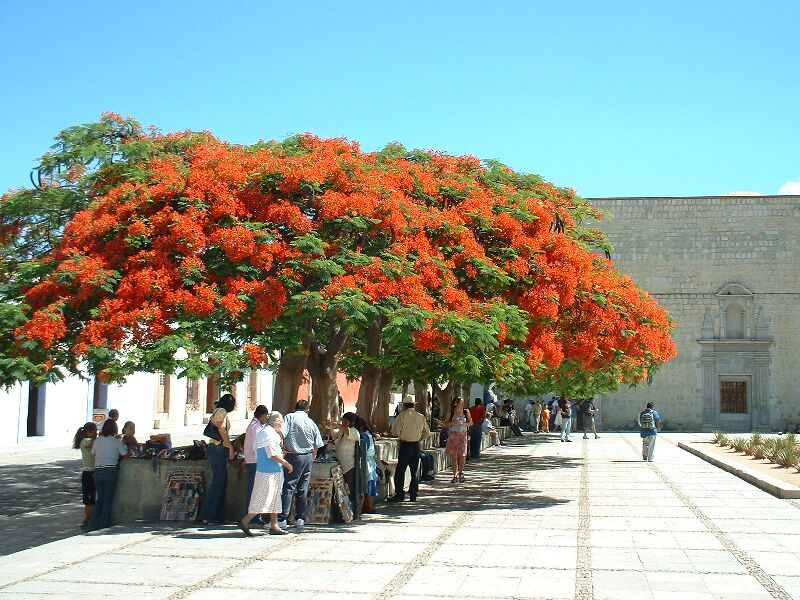
Delonix regia

- Samaan tree (Albizia saman)
- Flamboyant (Delonix regia)
- Tamarind (Tamarindus indica)

==== Moraceae ====
- Breadfruit (Artocarpus altilis)
- Ficus benjamina

==== Sapindaceae ====
- Ackee (Blighia sapida)

==== Sapotaceae ====
- Manilkara zapota

==== Verbenaceae ====
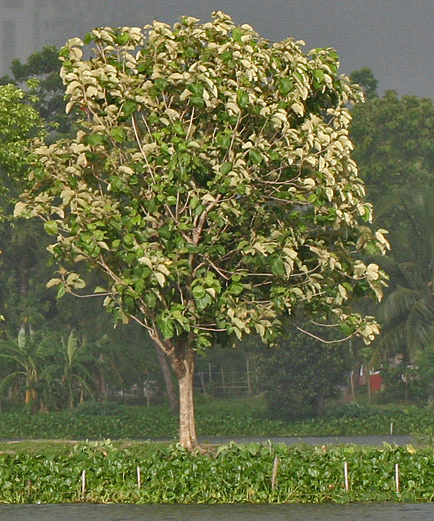
Tectona grandis

- Teak (Tectona grandis)
