= Hispaniolan pine forests =

Ecoregion in the Dominican Republic and Haiti

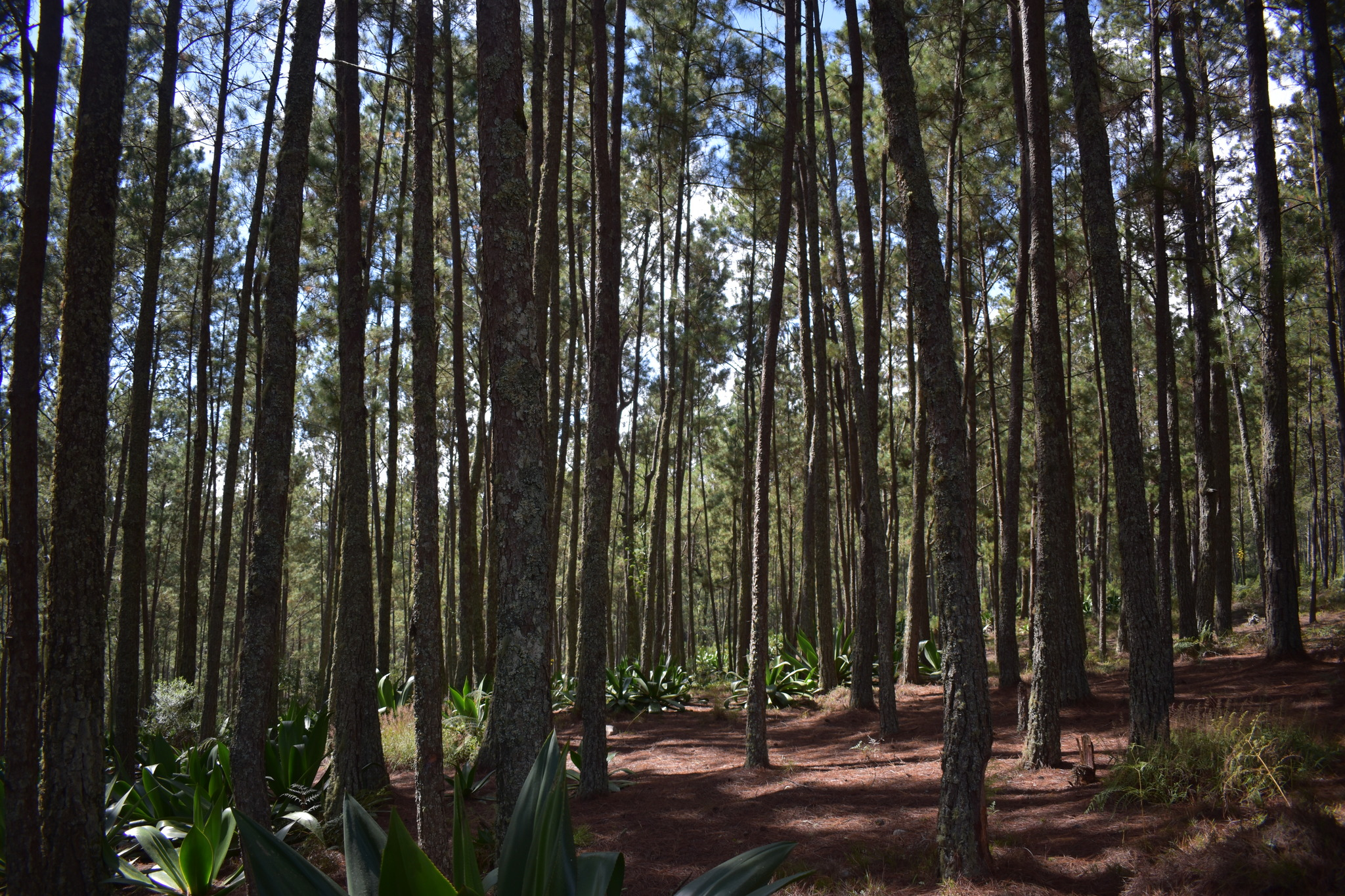
- Hispaniolan pine forest understory in Haiti

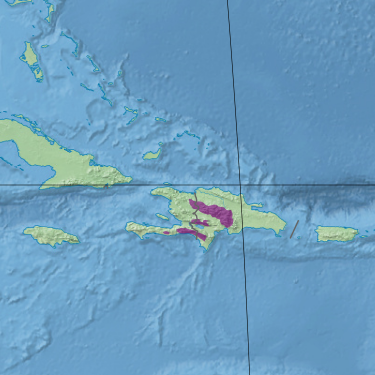
- Ecoregion territory (in purple)

Ecology
- Realm: Neotropical
- Biome: tropical and subtropical coniferous forests
- Borders: Hispaniolan moist forests; Hispaniolan dry forests

Geography
- Area: 11,600 km^{2} (4,500 mi^{2})
- Countries: Dominican Republic; Haiti

Conservation
- Conservation status: Critical/Endangered

The Hispaniolan pine forests are a subtropical coniferous forest ecoregion found on the Caribbean island of Hispaniola, which is shared by Haiti and the Dominican Republic. The ecoregion covers 11,600 km^{2} (4,500 sq mi), or about 15% of the island. It lies at elevations greater than 800 m (2,600 ft) in the mountains of Hispaniola, extending from the Cordillera Central of the Dominican Republic and into the Massif du Nord of Haiti. It is surrounded at lower elevations by the Hispaniolan moist forests and Hispaniolan dry forests ecoregions, which cover the remainder of the island. Annual rainfall is 1,000–2,000 mm (39–79 in).

== Flora ==
The natural vegetation of the region consists primarily of stands of pino criollo (Pinus occidentalis). Pines are mixed with other conifers, including sabina (Juniperus gracilior) and Podocarpus aristulatus (syn. P. buchii). Below 2,100 m (6,900 ft), pine forests are found on lateritic soils and are interspersed with areas of wet montane forest. Important broad-leaved species are Garrya fadyenii and Vaccinium cubense near Constanza and the Sierra de Bahoruco, Rapanea ferruginea near Jarabacoa and San José de las Matas, and Buddleja domingensis along the Cordillera Central. Plants of montane steppe (2,100–3,175 m or 6,890–10,417 ft) include cara de hombre (Lyonia spp.), abey (Cojoba arborea), yaya fina (Oxandra lanceolata), pajón (Danthonia domingensis), Verbena officinalis var. officinalis, and Weinmannia pinnata.

== Fauna ==
Many endemic and rare animal species occur in this ecoregion, including the Hispaniolan crossbill (Loxia megaplaga), white-winged warbler (Xenoligea montana), golden swallow (Tachycineta euchrysea) and the Darlington's galliwasp (Caribicus darlingtoni).

== Threats ==
More than half of the ecoregion's area has been lost to clearing for agriculture, pasture, or plantations of exotic trees. The Haitian portion of the ecoregion is much more deforested than the Dominican portion.
