= Podocarpus buchii =

Conservation status
- Endangered (IUCN 3.1)

Scientific classification
- Kingdom: Plantae
- Clade: Tracheophytes
- Clade: Gymnosperms
- Division: Pinophyta
- Class: Pinopsida
- Order: Araucariales
- Family: Podocarpaceae
- Genus: Podocarpus
- Species: P. buchii

Binomial name
- Podocarpus buchii Urb.

Synonyms
- Podocarpus angustifolius subsp. buchii (Urb.) Staszk.; Podocarpus angustifolius var. buchii (Urb.) Staszk.; Podocarpus aristulatus subsp. buchii (Urb.) Silba; Podocarpus aristulatus var. buchii (Urb.) Silba

Species of conifer

Podocarpus buchii is a species of conifer in the family Podocarpaceae. It is a shrub or small tree, growing up to 15 metres tall, which is native to central and southern Hispaniola in both the Dominican Republic and Haiti.

Podocarpus buchii is native to cloud forests from 1,100 to 2,500 metres elevation. It typically grows on north-facing slopes, on red clay soils or on hard karst limestone in Haiti. It is mostly found in the Dominican Republic, including the provinces of Independencia, Pedernales, and Peravia and Sierra de Bahoruco National Park. In Haiti it is limited to the southeast of the country, in Massif de la Selle, Mare Rouge, Montagne Noire, and Petite Source. It typically grows with broadleaved trees and tree ferns, and associated plants include Brunellia comocladiifolia, Frodinia tremula, Garrya fadyenii, Juniperus sp., Magnolia sp., Pinus occidentalis, Myrsine coriacea subsp. coriacea, and Vaccinium cubense.

The species' habitat is under threat from widespread logging for charcoal and timber, fire, hurricanes, and conversion to agriculture, and its extent of occurrence (EOO) and area of occupancy (AOO) are currently unknown. The species' habitat in Haiti is thought to be mostly lost or severely degraded. The population in the Dominican Republic's Sierra de Bahoruco National Park is relatively well protected. The species is assessed as endangered by the IUCN.
