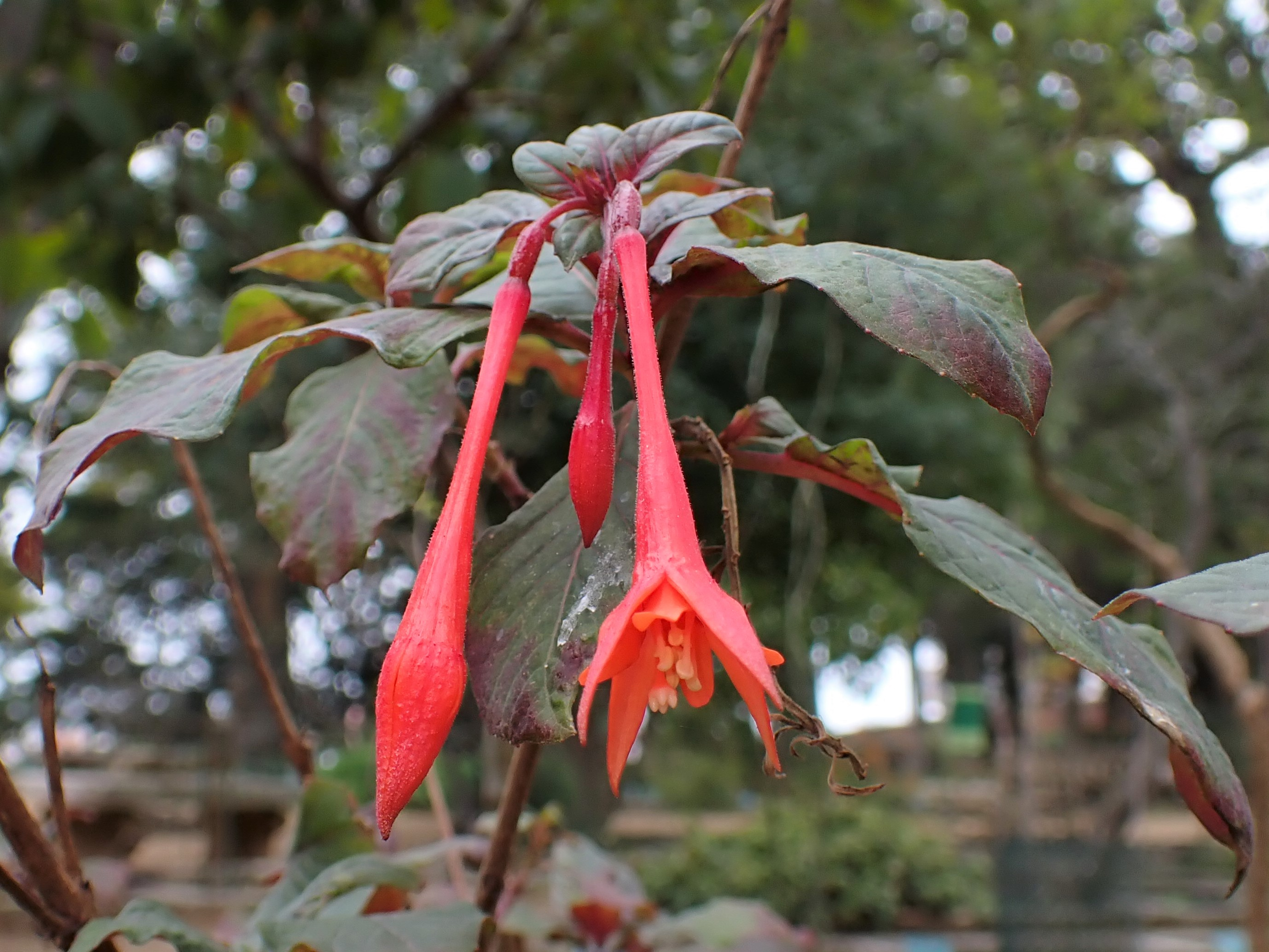

Scientific classification
- Kingdom: Plantae
- Clade: Tracheophytes
- Clade: Angiosperms
- Clade: Eudicots
- Clade: Rosids
- Order: Myrtales
- Family: Onagraceae
- Genus: Fuchsia
- Species: F. triphylla

Binomial name
- Fuchsia triphylla L.

= Fuchsia triphylla =

Species of flowering plant

Fuchsia triphylla is one of over 110 species that comprise the genus Fuchsia. Due to its attractiveness and its extensive blooming period which spans from early spring to late autumn, the plant has found a major role as a popular species to breed. This has a resulted in an extensive breed of cultivars allowing it to grow in various settings around the world. The visually appealing flowers of the Fuchsia triphylla have contributed to some of the most elegant Fuchsia hybrids produced today.

== Description ==
Fuchsia triphylla are small shrub plants. They can grow as high as two or three feet. The leaves are simple, elliptical, and quite large. The petiole insertion is whorled and characterized with a red or maroon tint on the underside of the leaves. The flowers of Fuchsia triphylla are long and tubular. Flowers are generally a red-orange or red-purple color. They tend to droop over and have stamens that extend from the tip.

As far as reproduction, this species produces a large amount of both flowers and seeds. Fuchsia triphylla use their appealing nature to their advantage in their life cycle. The beautiful flowers they produce attract many different organisms, particularly hummingbirds, which come and transport pollen between flowers for germination.

== Taxonomy ==
As a member of the genus Fuchsia, Fuchsia triphylla is a member of the family Onagraceae. Because there is such a large number of species for this genus, the botanist Philip A. Munz broke the genus down into nine sections. As the first species described in the genus, Fuchsia triphylla is in Section Fuchsia, which is the largest section of Fuchsia..

Because Fuchsia triphylla is popular worldwide, it has also developed several common names. Some of these names include Honeysuckle Fuchsia, Firecracker Fuchsia and Fuchsia Thalia.

== History ==
Charles Plumier is accredited with both the discovery and naming of Fuchsia. In the early 18th century, Plumier made an expedition to the Americas in search of a new genus. Fuchsia triphylla is the species that Plumier initially came upon and returned to France with. First, he named the genus Fuchsia after Leonhart Fuchs. Leonhart Fuchs was a popular German Medical Doctor who spent an immense amount of time studying plants with ambitions of discovering herbal remedies. Fucshia made its first official appearance in Nova Plantarum Americanum. Fuchsia triphylla was one of the first species named due to its early discovery, although new species have been continually discovered over the past several centuries.

Plumier's first encounter occurred on the hills of the Caribbean Islands. Fuchsia triphylla is native to Haiti and the Dominican Republic.

== Cultivation ==
Fuchsia triphylla is a popular species for cultivation, primarily for ornamental purposes. Although the plant is capable of living in a decent range of environments, the ideal conditions greatly resemble its place of discovery. Ideal temperatures are just below 80 °F (27 °C) during the day and just over 60 °F (16 °C) at night. The plant also grows best when not overly exposed to direct sunlight. It thrives in well-drained soils with a pH range of 6–7. This is all characteristic of the mountainous regions where this plant seems to be most commonly found in the wild. Another reason these are good garden plants is their unlikelihood to get pests or diseases. The most commonly found pests, however, tend to be whitefly.
