= Senna domingensis =

Conservation status
- Vulnerable (IUCN 2.3)

Scientific classification
- Kingdom: Plantae
- Clade: Tracheophytes
- Clade: Angiosperms
- Clade: Eudicots
- Clade: Rosids
- Order: Fabales
- Family: Fabaceae
- Subfamily: Caesalpinioideae
- Genus: Senna
- Species: S. domingensis

Binomial name
- Senna domingensis (Spreng.) H.S.Irwin & Barneby

Synonyms
- Cassia domingensis Spreng. Cassia scleroxyla Britton

Species of legume

Senna domingensis is a flowering plant species in the legume family (Fabaceae). It is a threatened species, found in Cuba, the Dominican Republic, and Haiti.

== Etymology ==
The species has been given the specific epithet "domingensis", as it occurs on the island of Hispaniola. This island was historically called Santo Domingo, or Saint-Domingue.
