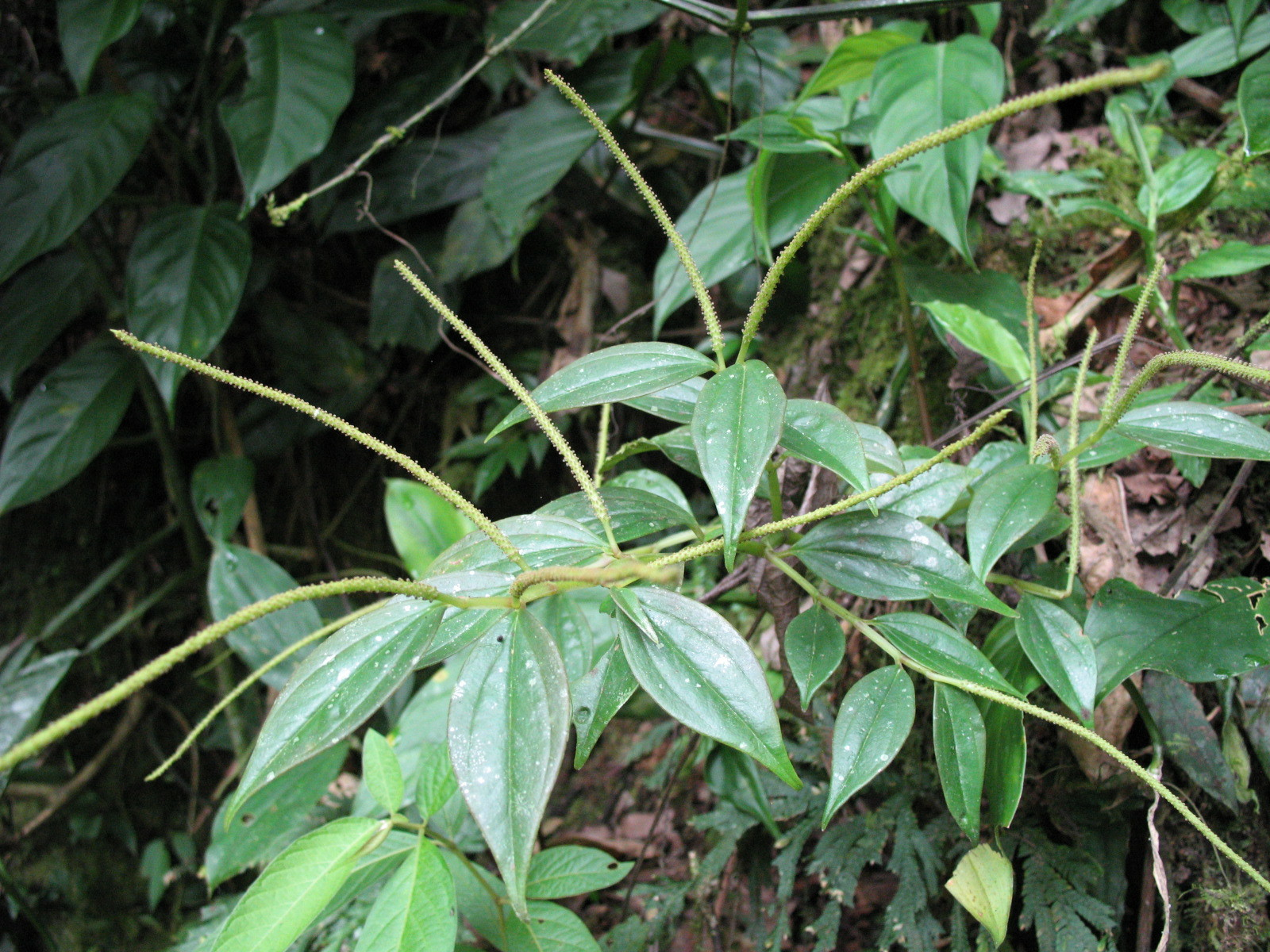

Scientific classification
- Kingdom: Plantae
- Clade: Tracheophytes
- Clade: Angiosperms
- Clade: Magnoliids
- Order: Piperales
- Family: Piperaceae
- Genus: Peperomia
- Species: P. alata

Binomial name
- Peperomia alata Ruiz & Pav.

Synonyms
- List: Micropiper alatum (Ruiz & Pav.) Miq.; Piper alatum (Ruiz & Pav.) Vahl; Peperomia laevis C.DC.; Peperomia microreticulata Steyerm.; Peperomia nilssonii Yunck.; Peperomia pterocaulis Miq.; Peperomia velloziana Miq.

= Peperomia alata =

Winged peperomia

Species of flowering plant

Peperomia alata, commonly known as the winged peperomia, is a species of plant in the genus Peperomia of the family Piperaceae. Its native range covers most of tropical and subtropical America, from southern North America through West Indies and Central America to South America. It can also be found in Florida, although there it is apparently rare, known for certain only from swamps in Collier County.

== Description ==
Peperomia alata is a perennial herb, erect or reclining, spreading by rhizomes. The epithet "alata," i.e., "winged," refers to wings that run the length of the stems, although this is rather obscure on some specimens. Leaves are 3-veined, elliptic to lanceolate, with blades up to 13 cm (5.2 inches) long. Flowers are born in tight spikes up to 13 cm (5.2 inches) long.
