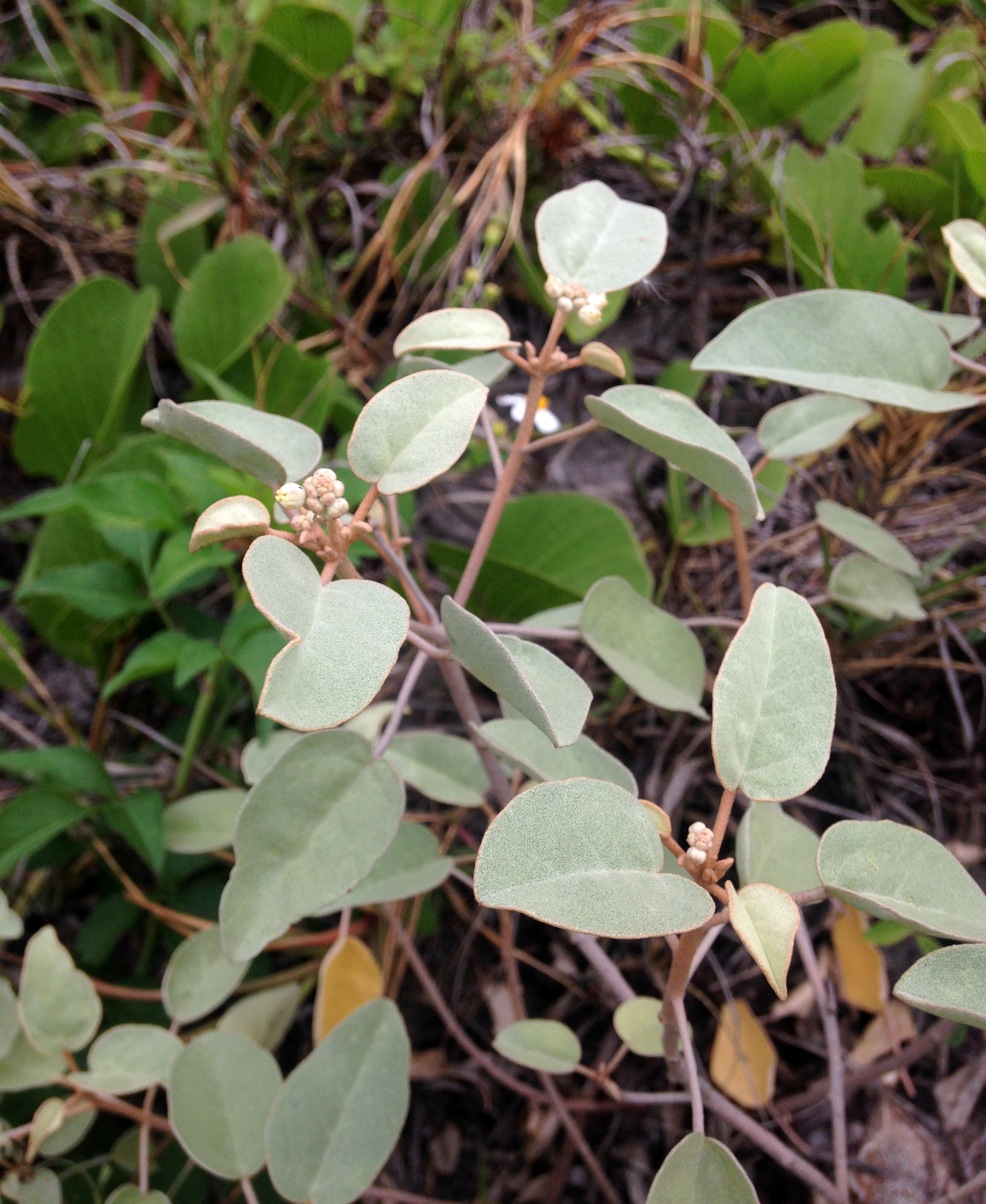

Conservation status
- Secure (NatureServe)

- Least Concern (IUCN 3.1)

Scientific classification
- Kingdom: Plantae
- Clade: Tracheophytes
- Clade: Angiosperms
- Clade: Eudicots
- Clade: Rosids
- Order: Malpighiales
- Family: Euphorbiaceae
- Genus: Croton
- Species: C. punctatus

Binomial name
- Croton punctatus Jacq.

= Croton punctatus =

Species of flowering plant

Croton punctatus, commonly called beach-tea or gulf croton, is a species of flowering plant in the spurge family (Euphorbiaceae). It is native to the Western Hemisphere, where it is found in coastal areas from the Southeastern United States south to Colombia, as well as in Bermuda and the Caribbean. Its natural habitat is on beaches and sand dunes.

Croton punctatus is a dense, suffrutescent herbaceous plant. Its broad leaves have a notably silvery appearance. It produces small, inconspicuous flowers throughout the year.

Croton punctatus is a self-incompatible plant because its flowers are unisexual.
