= Podocarpus hispaniolensis =

Conservation status
- Endangered (IUCN 3.1)

Scientific classification
- Kingdom: Plantae
- Clade: Tracheophytes
- Clade: Gymnosperms
- Division: Pinophyta
- Class: Pinopsida
- Order: Araucariales
- Family: Podocarpaceae
- Genus: Podocarpus
- Species: P. hispaniolensis

Binomial name
- Podocarpus hispaniolensis de Laub.

Synonyms
- Podocarpus buchii var. latifolius Florin

Species of conifer

Podocarpus hispaniolensis is a species of conifer in the family Podocarpaceae. It is endemic to the Dominican Republic.

This tree grows in rainforest habitat with Prestoea montana, Clusia clusioides, Cyrilla racemiflora, Byrsonima lucida, Didymopanax tremulus, Haenianthus salicifolius, and Magnolia pallescens. The population of this plant is fragmented and made up of scattered individuals. The habitat is degraded by logging. The timber of this species has been overharvested for construction wood.
