= Dorstenia erythranda =

Scientific classification
- Kingdom: Plantae
- Clade: Tracheophytes
- Clade: Angiosperms
- Clade: Eudicots
- Clade: Rosids
- Order: Rosales
- Family: Moraceae
- Genus: Dorstenia
- Species: D. erythranda

Binomial name
- Dorstenia erythranda Griseb.

Synonyms
- Dorstenia confusa Britton; Dorstenia domingensis Urb. & Ekman; Dorstenia multisquamae Urb. Dorstenia nipensis Urb. & Ekman; Dorstenia howardii León

Species of flowering plant

Dorstenia erythranda is a plant species in the family Moraceae which is native to Cuba and Hispaniola.
