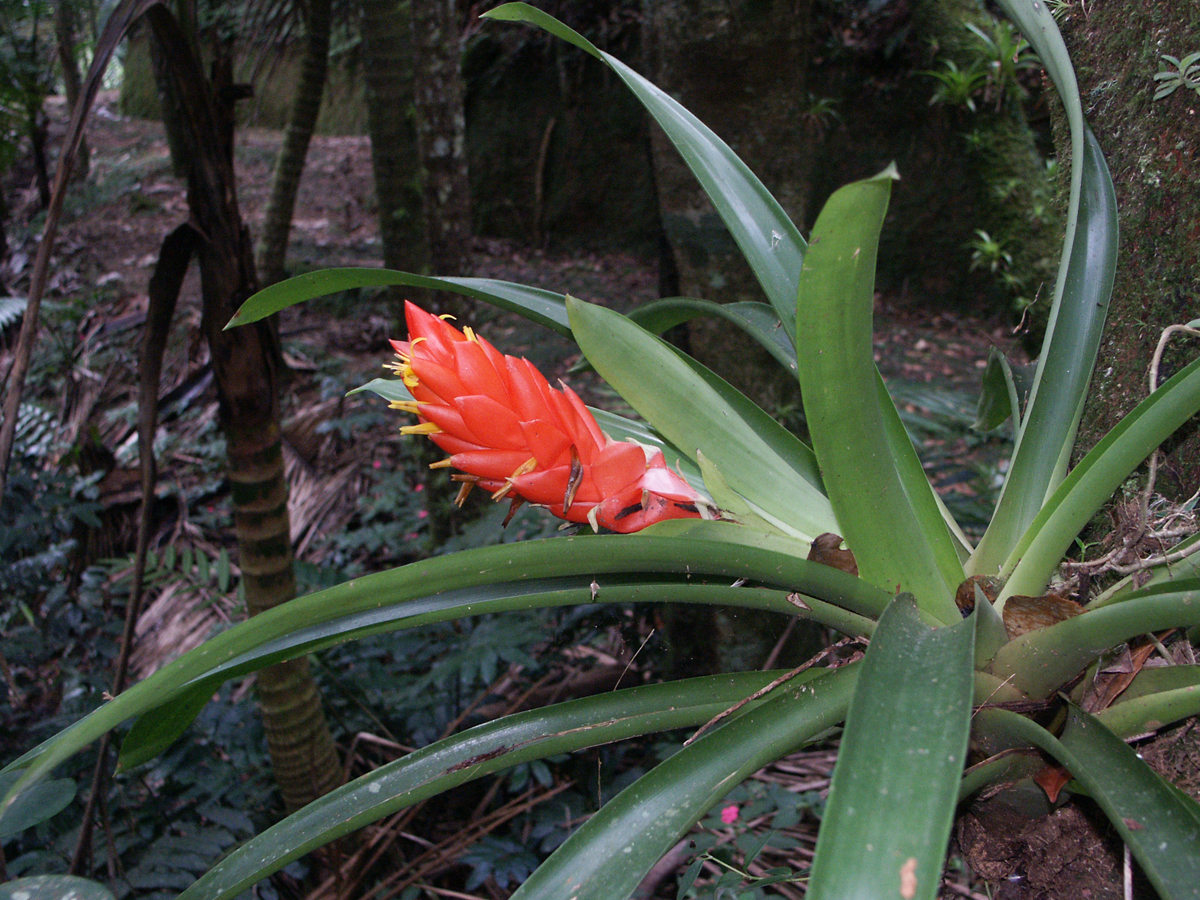

Scientific classification
- Kingdom: Plantae
- Clade: Tracheophytes
- Clade: Angiosperms
- Clade: Monocots
- Clade: Commelinids
- Order: Poales
- Family: Bromeliaceae
- Genus: Guzmania
- Species: G. berteroniana

Binomial name
- Guzmania berteroniana (Schultes f.) Mez

Synonyms
- Caraguata berteroniana Schult. & Schult.f.; Tillandsia caraguata D.Dietr., illegitimate; Devillea speciosa Bertero ex Schult. & Schult.f.; Tillandsia devillea Steud.; Caraguata grandiflora Baker

= Guzmania berteroniana =

Species of flowering plant

Guzmania berteroniana is a plant species in the genus Guzmania. It is native to Panama, Puerto Rico and the Dominican Republic but cultivated elsewhere as an ornamental. It can be found in the wild at the Toro Negro State Forest in Ponce, Puerto Rico.

== Cultivars ==
- Guzmania 'Elaine'
- Guzmania Eliane (Elaine)
