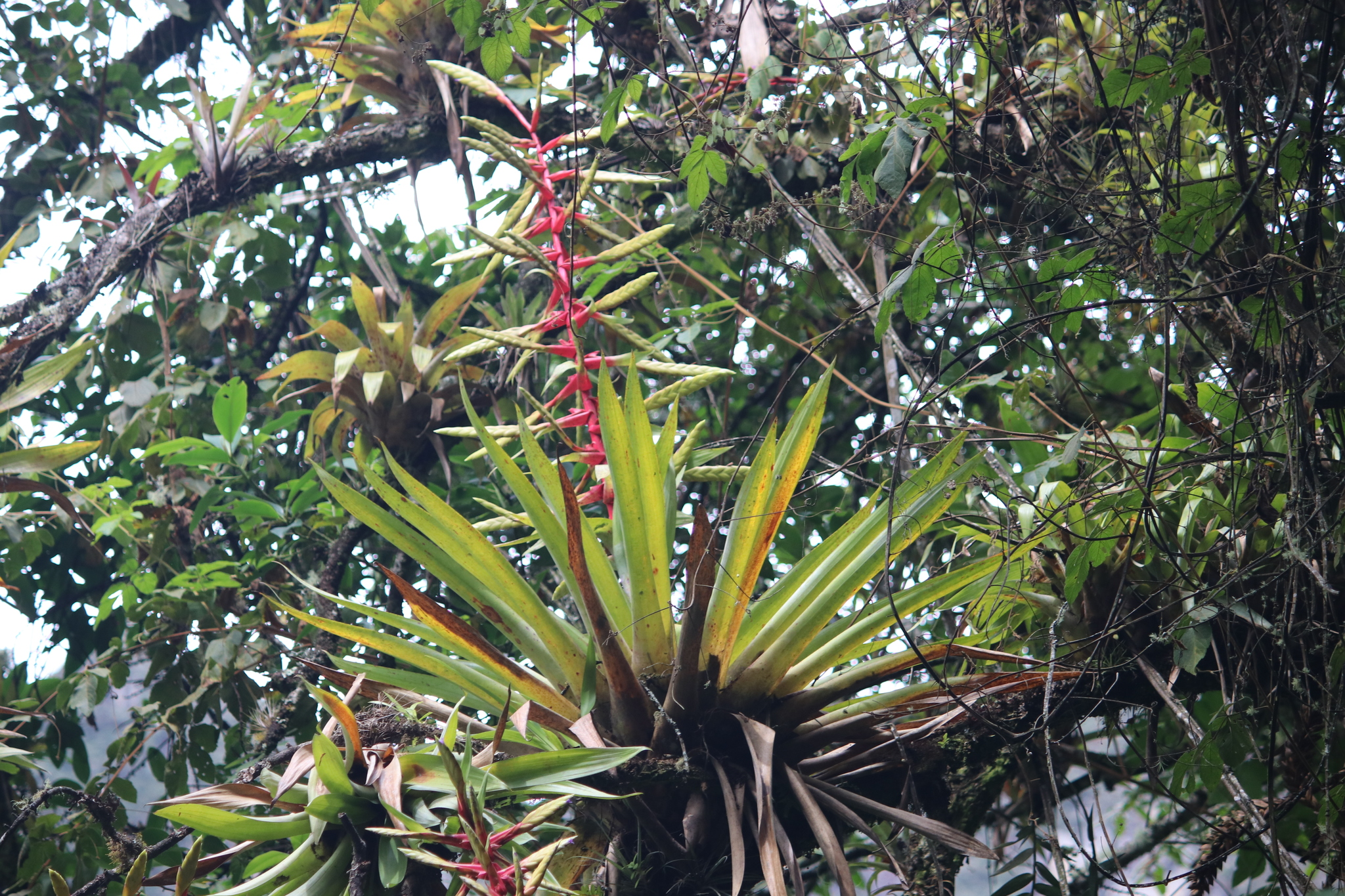

Conservation status
- Least Concern (IUCN 3.1)

Scientific classification
- Kingdom: Plantae
- Clade: Tracheophytes
- Clade: Angiosperms
- Clade: Monocots
- Clade: Commelinids
- Order: Poales
- Family: Bromeliaceae
- Genus: Tillandsia
- Subgenus: Tillandsia subg. Tillandsia
- Species: T. fendleri

Binomial name
- Tillandsia fendleri Griseb.

Synonyms
- Tillandsia incurvata C.Wright; Tillandsia kalbreyeri Baker; Tillandsia bangii Baker ex Rusby; Tillandsia smithiana Carabia

= Tillandsia fendleri =

Species of flowering plant

Tillandsia fendleri is a species of flowering plant in the family Bromeliaceae. It is epiphytic. This species is native to the West Indies (Cuba, Hispaniola, Jamaica, Trinidad) and South America (Bolivia, Guyana, Colombia, Peru, northern Brazil, Venezuela and Ecuador).

Two varieties are recognized:

1. Tillandsia fendleri var. fendleri – most of species range
2. Tillandsia fendleri var. reducta (L.B.Sm.) L.B.Sm. – Venezuela, Colombia, Ecuador, Peru
