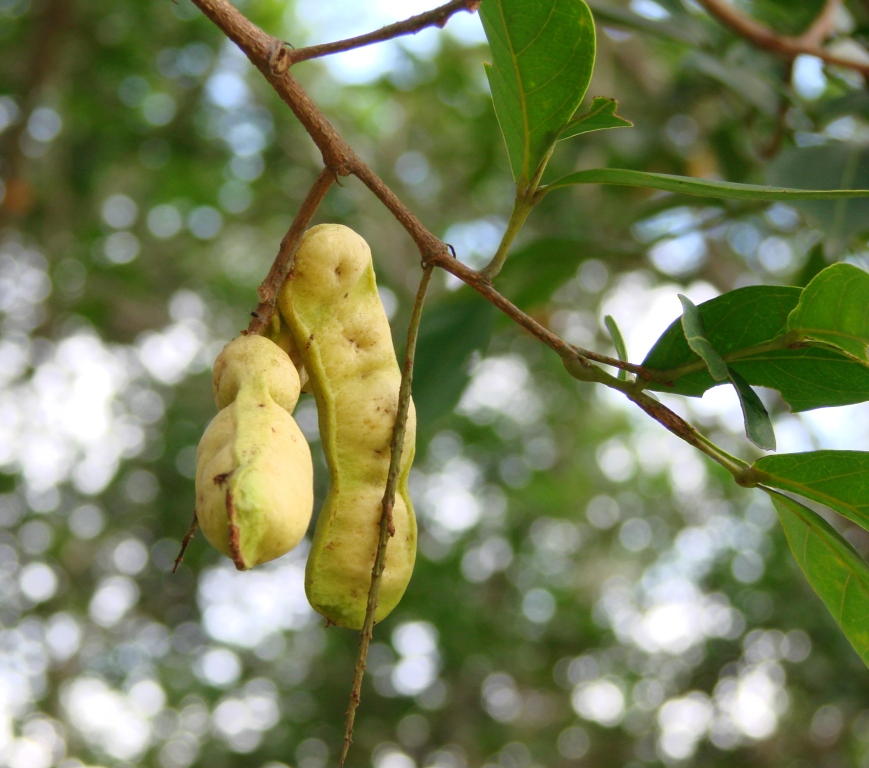

Conservation status
- Least Concern (IUCN 3.1)

Scientific classification
- Kingdom: Plantae
- Clade: Tracheophytes
- Clade: Angiosperms
- Clade: Eudicots
- Clade: Rosids
- Order: Fabales
- Family: Fabaceae
- Subfamily: Caesalpinioideae
- Clade: Mimosoid clade
- Genus: Inga
- Species: I. laurina

Binomial name
- Inga laurina (Sw.) Willd.

= Inga laurina =

Species of legume

Inga laurina is a species of plant in the family Fabaceae. It native to an area from Mexico south to Argentina, including in the Caribbean. The species is present throughout most of Brazil, where it is called ingá-mirim (small ice-cream-bean) due to the relatively small pods.
