= Prunus occidentalis =

Conservation status
- Least Concern (IUCN 3.1)

Scientific classification
- Kingdom: Plantae
- Clade: Tracheophytes
- Clade: Angiosperms
- Clade: Eudicots
- Clade: Rosids
- Order: Rosales
- Family: Rosaceae
- Genus: Prunus
- Species: P. occidentalis

Binomial name
- Prunus occidentalis Sw.

Synonyms
- Cerasus occidentalis (Sw.) Dum. Cours.; Laurocerasus occidentalis (Sw.) M. Roem.; Lauro-cerasus occidentalis (Sw.) M. Roem.

Species of tree

Prunus occidentalis is a plant in the family Rosaceae of the order Rosales.

== Common names ==
Its Spanish common names include almendrón. Its English common name is the western cherry laurel.

== Distribution and habitat ==
The plant can be found in the Caribbean, Central America and northern South America. It is commonly found in Puerto Rico and particularly in the Toro Negro State Forest. It has been introduced to Trinidad and Tobago.
