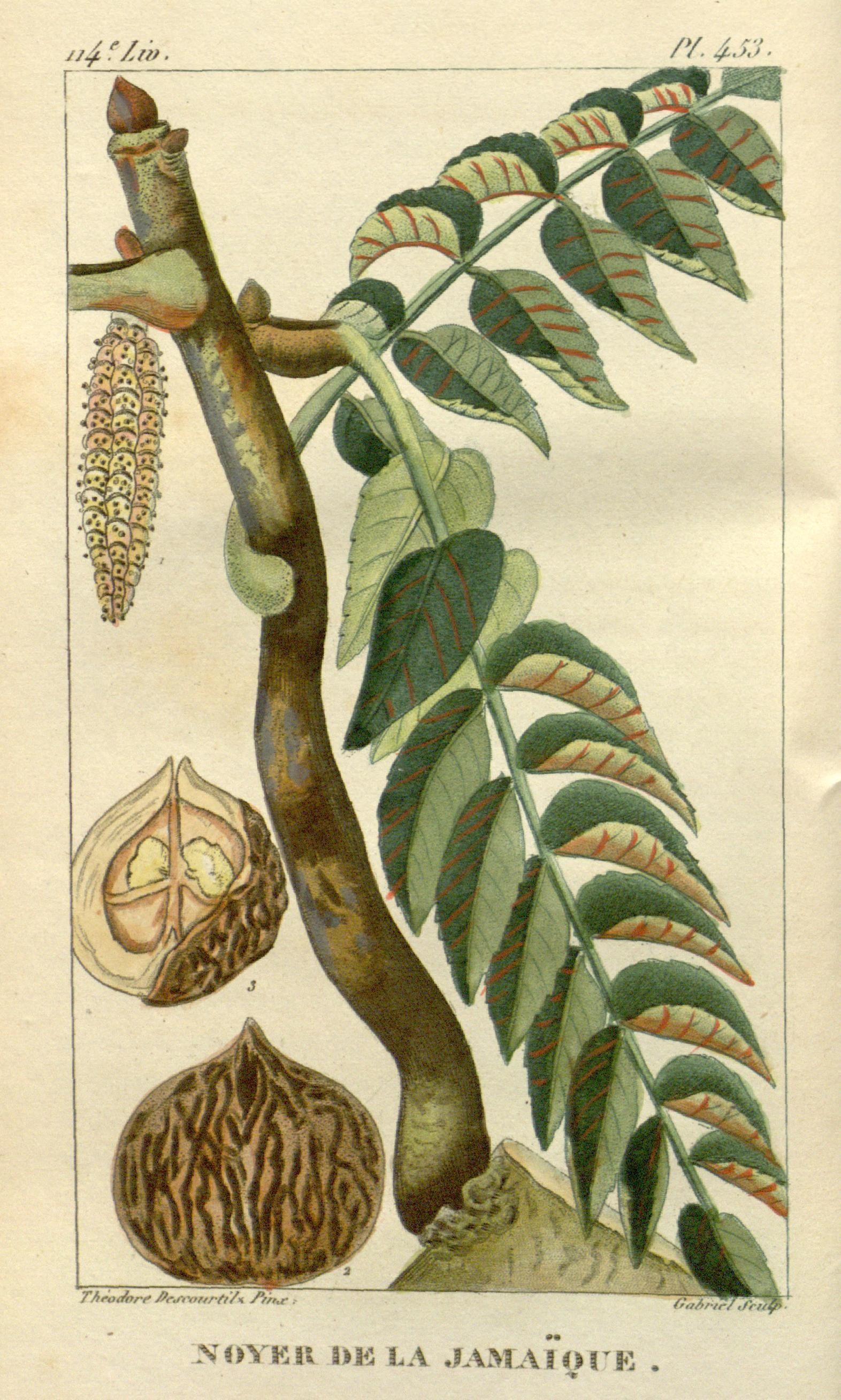

Conservation status
- Vulnerable (IUCN 2.3)

Scientific classification
- Kingdom: Plantae
- Clade: Tracheophytes
- Clade: Angiosperms
- Clade: Eudicots
- Clade: Rosids
- Order: Fagales
- Family: Juglandaceae
- Genus: Juglans
- Section: Juglans sect. Rhysocaryon
- Species: J. jamaicensis

Binomial name
- Juglans jamaicensis C.DC.

Synonyms
- Juglans domingensis Dode; Juglans insularis Griseb.; Juglans jamaicensis subsp. insularis (Griseb.) H.Schaarschm.; Juglans portoricensis Dode; Nux insularis (Griseb.) M.Gómez

= Juglans jamaicensis =

Species of tree

Juglans jamaicensis, the West Indian walnut, nogal, or palo de nuez, is a species of walnut in the Juglandaceae family native to the Greater Antilles.

== Distribution ==
It is found on Cuba, Hispaniola (the Dominican Republic and Haiti), and Puerto Rico. It is not, in fact, native to Jamaica, as its name would suggest.

== Description ==
This is a large tree which can reach 25 m (82 ft) in height. The compound leaves are each made up of several lance-shaped, toothed leaflets up to 9 centimeters long. Trees bear male and female inflorescences, the male a catkin up to 11 centimeters long and the female an array of flowers at the end of a newly grown shoot. The fruit is a drupe roughly 2 to 3 centimeters long with a black husk and a seed, which is an edible walnut meat, inside. The attractive wood is similar to that of the black walnut (Juglans nigra).

== Conservation ==
In Puerto Rico there are only ten to fourteen trees of this species remaining. It is also rare in Cuba and Hispaniola. It is threatened by habitat loss. It may never have been common, but specimens were likely lost when forest was cleared for coffee plantations on Puerto Rico, and it was probably harvested for wood.

This tree has protection under the Endangered Species Act of the United States, where it is listed as an endangered species.
