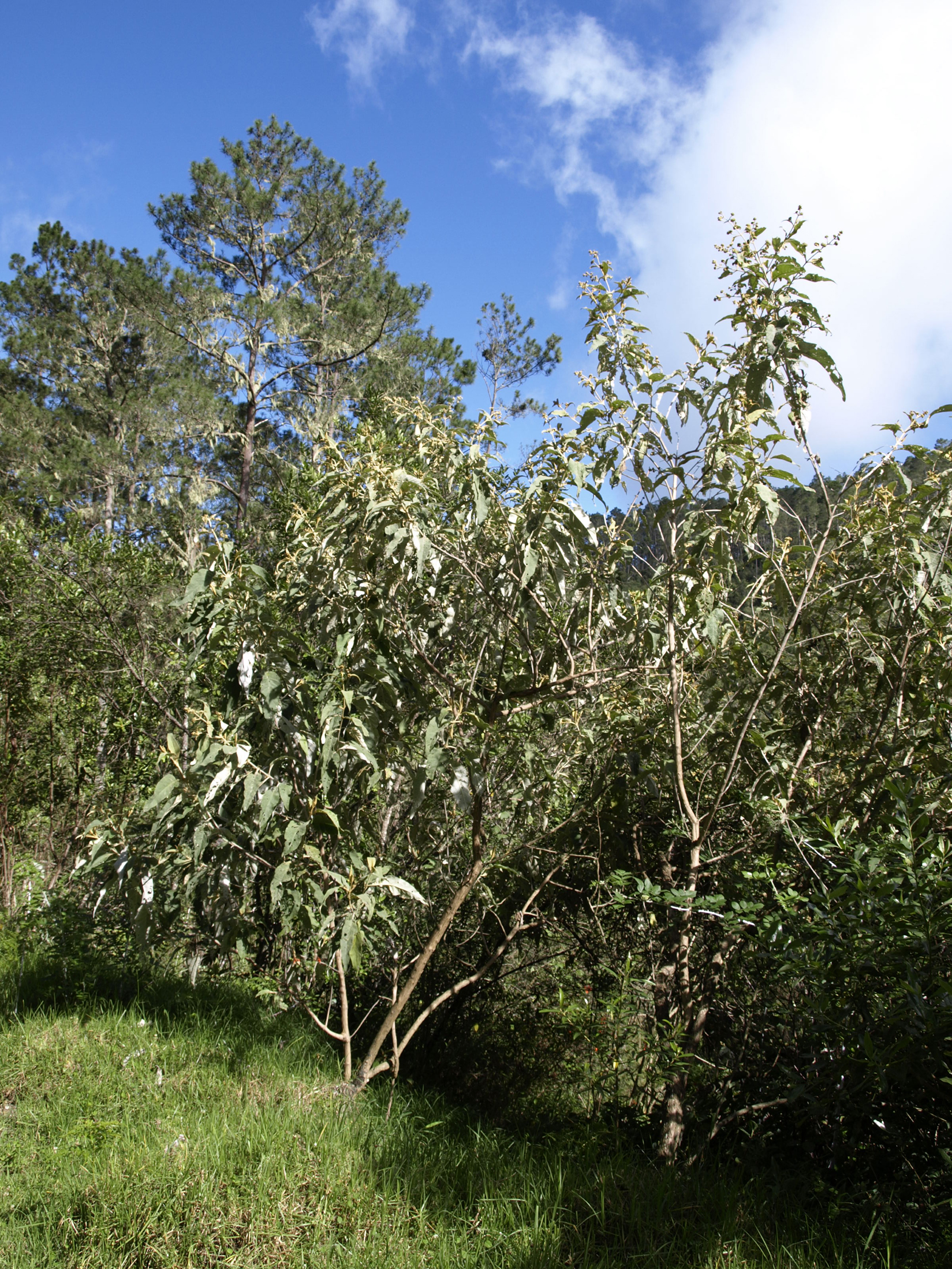

Conservation status
- Least Concern (IUCN 3.1)

Scientific classification
- Kingdom: Plantae
- Clade: Tracheophytes
- Clade: Angiosperms
- Clade: Eudicots
- Clade: Asterids
- Order: Lamiales
- Family: Scrophulariaceae
- Genus: Buddleja
- Species: B. domingensis

Binomial name
- Buddleja domingensis Urb.

Synonyms
- Buddleja calcicola Urb.

= Buddleja domingensis =

Species of flowering plant

Buddleja domingensis, also known as the Hispaniolan butterfly bush, is a species endemic to the high mountain ranges in the Caribbean island of Hispaniola (Haiti and the Dominican Republic), growing in rocky, limestone ravines, along forest edges and roadsides.

== Taxonomy ==
The species has been given the specific epithet "domingensis", as it occurs on the island of Hispaniola. This island was historically called Santo Domingo, or Saint-Domingue.

It was first described and named by Ignatz Urban in 1908.

== Description ==
Buddleja domingensis is a dioecious or possibly trioecious shrub or small tree 2–6 m high, with subquadrangular, lanate young branches bearing leaves with petioles 1–2 cm long, membranaceous ovate-lanceolate to lanceolate 13–24 cm long by 3–8 cm wide, tomentose to glabrescent above, lanate below. The yellow inflorescences are 10–27 cm long, with one or rarely two orders of branches, comprising heads 1.5–2.5 cm in diameter, each with 20–50 flowers, borne in leafy-bracted racemes; the corolla tubes are 3–3.5 mm long. Ploidy: 2n = 38 (diploid).

== Cultivation ==
The species is not known to be in cultivation.
