= Terminalia tetraphylla =

Conservation status
- Least Concern (IUCN 3.1)

Scientific classification
- Kingdom: Plantae
- Clade: Tracheophytes
- Clade: Angiosperms
- Clade: Eudicots
- Clade: Rosids
- Order: Myrtales
- Family: Combretaceae
- Genus: Terminalia
- Species: T. tetraphylla

Binomial name
- Terminalia tetraphylla (Aubl.) Gere & Boatwr.

Synonyms
- Synonymy: Buchenavia capitata (Vahl) Eichler; Buchenavia ptariensis Steyerm.; Buchenavia tetraphylla (Aubl.) R.A.Howard; Buchenavia vaupesana Cuatrec.; Bucida angustifolia Spruce ex Eichler; Bucida capitata Vahl; Cordia tetraphylla Aubl.; Firensia lutea Raf.; Gerascanthus tetraphyllus (Aubl.) Borhidi; Hudsonia arborea Lunan; Lithocardium tetraphyllum (Aubl.) Kuntze; Terminalia capitata C.Wright; Terminalia hilariana Steud.; Terminalia obovata Cambess.; Pseudolmedia bucidifolia Bello

Species of plant

Terminalia tetraphylla is species of flowering plant in the family Combretaceae. It is a tree native to tropical Central and South America, from Costa Rica to Bolivia and southeastern Brazil, and to the Caribbean – Cuba, Hispaniola, Puerto Rico, Leeward Islands, Windward Islands, and Trinidad and Tobago. Its Spanish vernacular names include granadillo (Puerto Rico), almendro (Colombia), amarillo and olivo negro (Venezuela), and mirindiba and periquiteira (Brazil). Its English vernacular name is fourleaf buchenavia.

== Taxonomy ==
The species was first described as Cordia tetraphylla by Jean Baptiste Christophore Fusée Aublet in 1775. In 1983 Richard A. Howard placed the species in genus Buchenavia as B. tetraphylla. In 2017 Jephris Gere and James Stephen Boatwright merged Buchenavia with genus Terminalia, and renamed the species Terminalia tetraphylla. It has many synonyms, including Terminalia capitata.

== Characteristics ==
Terminalia tetraphylla grows to a height of 60 to 80 ft and 2 to 4 ft in diameter; has rather large buttresses, but has good log form above them.

== Habitat ==
The tree is common in the Toro Negro State Forest. It is native to Puerto Rico and the United States Virgin Islands.
