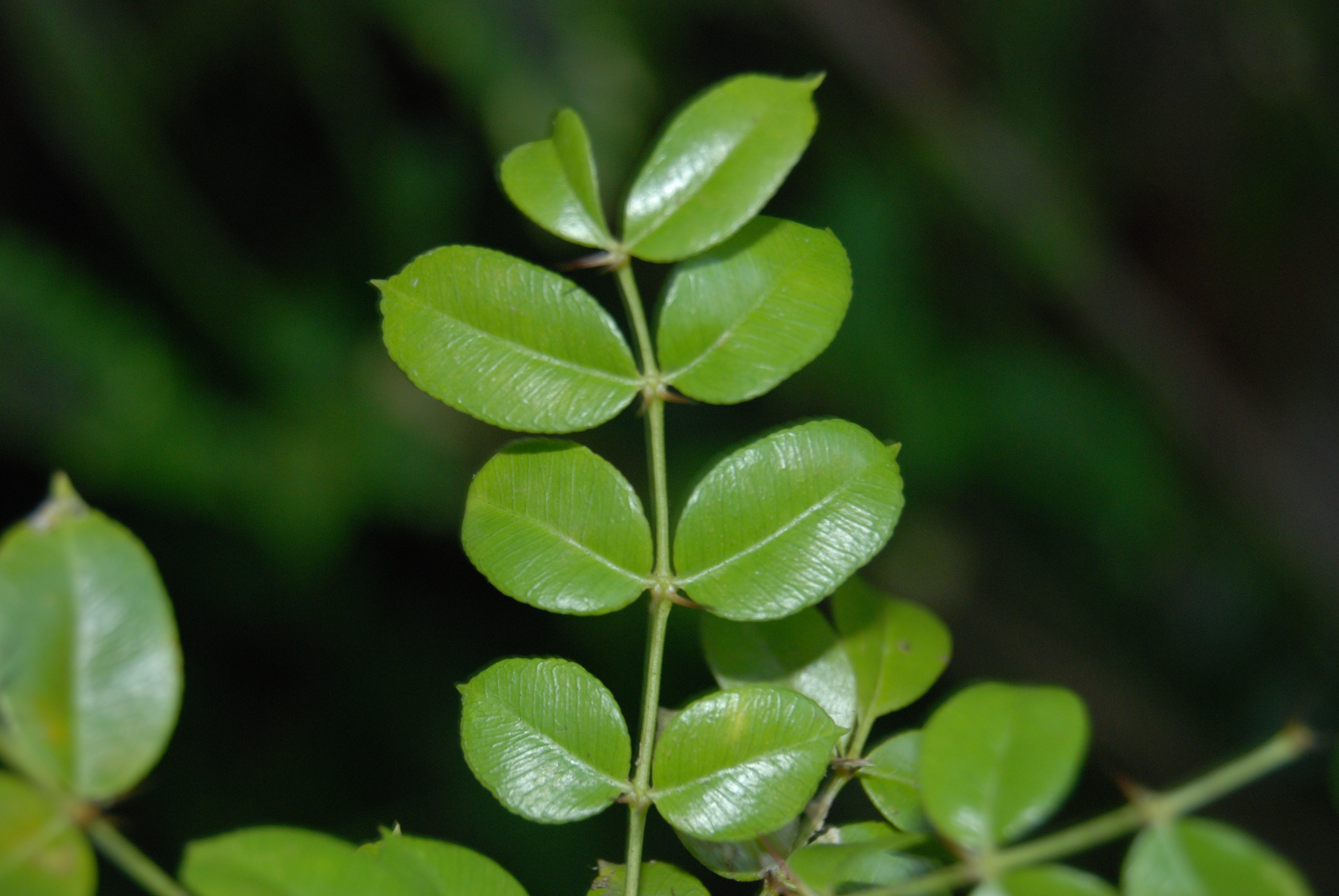

Conservation status
- Least Concern (IUCN 3.1)

Scientific classification
- Kingdom: Plantae
- Clade: Tracheophytes
- Clade: Angiosperms
- Clade: Eudicots
- Clade: Rosids
- Order: Sapindales
- Family: Rutaceae
- Genus: Zanthoxylum
- Species: Z. punctatum

Binomial name
- Zanthoxylum punctatum Vahl

Subspecies
- Zanthoxylum punctatum subsp. obtriangulare (Urb.) Reynel; Zanthoxylum punctatum subsp. punctatum; Zanthoxylum punctatum subsp. thomasianum (Krug & Urb.) Reynel

Synonyms
- species synonyms: Tobinia punctata (Vahl) Griseb.; synonyms of subsp. obtriangulare: Fagara obtriangularis Urb.; Zanthoxylum obtriangulare (Urb.) J.Jiménez Alm.; synonyms of subsp. punctatum: Fagara trifoliata Sw.; Tobinia ternata (Sw.) Desv.; Zanthoxylum ternatum Sw.; Zanthoxylum trifoliatum (Sw.) W.Wright; synonyms of subsp. thomasianum: Fagara thomasiana Krug & Urb.; Zanthoxylum thomasianum Krug & Urb.

= Zanthoxylum punctatum =

Species of flowering plant

Zanthoxylum punctatum, also known as the , is a species of flowering plant in the family Rutaceae. It is a shrub or tree of the Caribbean, where it is native to the Bahamas, Hispaniola (Dominican Republic and Haiti), Puerto Rico, the Leeward Islands, Windward Islands, Netherlands Antilles, and Trinidad and Tobago. Its natural habitats are tropical dry broadleaf forests and tropical dry scrub. It is threatened by habitat loss.

Three subspecies are accepted:

- Zanthoxylum punctatum subsp. obtriangulare (Urb.) Reynel – Dominican Republic
- Zanthoxylum punctatum subsp. punctatum – Bahamas, Hispaniola, Leeward Islands, Netherlands Antilles, Puerto Rico, Trinidad and Tobago, and Windward Islands
- Zanthoxylum punctatum subsp. thomasianum (Krug & Urb.) Reynel – Virgin Islands

Subspecies thomasianum, known as St. Thomas prickly-ash, is native to Puerto Rico, the British Virgin Islands, and the United States Virgin Islands, where it grows in dry forest and dry scrub. and is the only plant species on St. John listed as "endangered".
