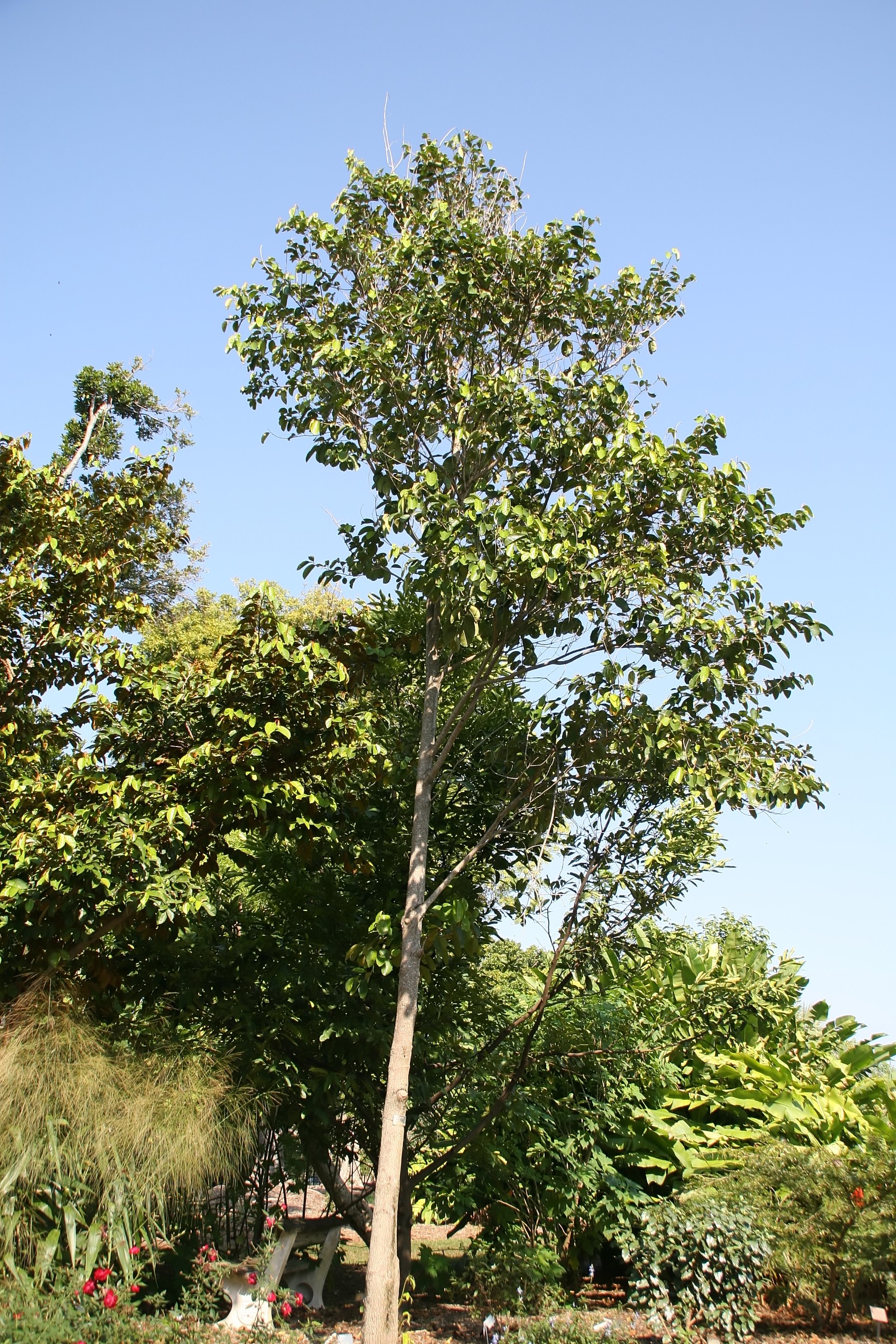
- Chrysophyllum argenteum subsp. auratum at Fairchild Tropical Botanic Garden, Florida

Conservation status
- Least Concern (IUCN 3.1)

Scientific classification
- Kingdom: Plantae
- Clade: Embryophytes
- Clade: Tracheophytes
- Clade: Spermatophytes
- Clade: Angiosperms
- Clade: Eudicots
- Clade: Asterids
- Order: Ericales
- Family: Sapotaceae
- Genus: Chrysophyllum
- Species: C. argenteum

Binomial name
- Chrysophyllum argenteum Jacq.

Synonyms
- Cynodendron argenteum (Jacq.) Baehni

= Chrysophyllum argenteum =

Species of tree

Chrysophyllum argenteum is a tree in the family Sapotaceae, native to the tropical Americas.

== Description ==
Chrysophyllum argenteum grows up to 30 metres (100 ft) tall, with a trunk diameter of up to 50 cm (20 in). Larger trees may feature buttresses. Its grey bark is fissured. The elliptic or oblong leaves measure up to 15 cm (6 in) long. Fascicles feature up to 10 cream to green flowers. The ellipsoid fruits ripen purple to black and measure up to 2.5 cm (1 in) long.

== Distribution and habitat ==
Chrysophyllum argenteum is native to a wide area from the Caribbean to Central America and tropical South America. Its habitat is in various forest types and grasslands at altitudes up to 1,600 m (5,200 ft).
