= Manilkara valenzuelana =

Conservation status
- Near Threatened (IUCN 3.1)

Scientific classification
- Kingdom: Plantae
- Clade: Tracheophytes
- Clade: Angiosperms
- Clade: Eudicots
- Clade: Asterids
- Order: Ericales
- Family: Sapotaceae
- Genus: Manilkara
- Species: M. valenzuelana

Binomial name
- Manilkara valenzuelana (A.Rich.) T.D.Penn.

Synonyms
- Lucuma valenzuelana A.Rich. (basionym) (Poss. synon.) Radlkoferella valenzuelana (A. Rich.) Pierre

Species of shrub

Manilkara valenzuelana is a species of tree or tall shrub in the Sapodilla family. It is native to coastal and subcoastal semi-deciduous forests of Cuba (Pinar del Río and Oriente), the Dominican Republic, Haiti, and Puerto Rico. Its habitat has been declining under pressure from charcoal makers, logging, and the clearing of forest for human habitation.
