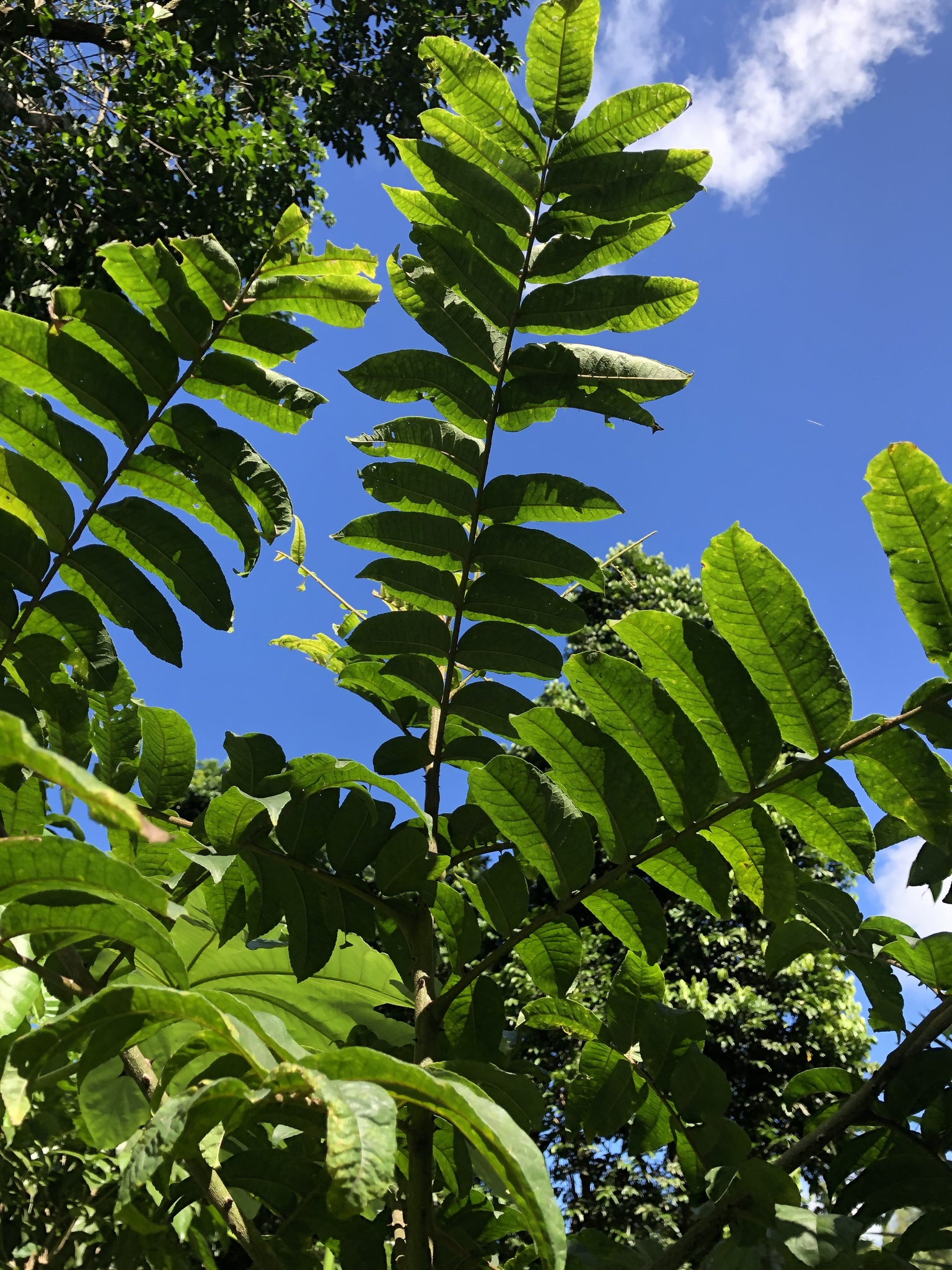
- In Puerto Rico

Scientific classification
- Kingdom: Plantae
- Clade: Tracheophytes
- Clade: Angiosperms
- Clade: Eudicots
- Clade: Rosids
- Order: Sapindales
- Family: Rutaceae
- Genus: Zanthoxylum
- Species: Z. martinicense

Binomial name
- Zanthoxylum martinicense (Lam.) DC.

= Zanthoxylum martinicense =

Species of tree

Zanthoxylum martinicense, the Martinique prickly ash, white pricklyash, or espino rubial, is an evergreen tree with pinnately compound leaves and thick conical spines on its bark. It grows up to 20 m tall. Male and female flowers are on separate trees. The flower clusters (panicles) are terminal and much branched, bearing many almost stalkless flowers.

== Distribution ==
Zanthoxylum martinicense is native to the West Indies and northern South America including Colombia, Ecuador and Venezuela.

== Habitat ==
Moist areas in limestone based soils in full sun. Typical of lowland forests in the Puerto Rican moist forest ecoregion.

== Ecology ==
The fruit has five parts, each of which splits open to reveal a single shiny black seed. The seeds are small (0.0009 g) and dispersed by birds.
