= Frodinia tremula =

Scientific classification
- Kingdom: Plantae
- Clade: Tracheophytes
- Clade: Angiosperms
- Clade: Eudicots
- Clade: Asterids
- Order: Apiales
- Family: Araliaceae
- Genus: Frodinia
- Species: F. tremula

Binomial name
- Frodinia tremula (Krug & Urb.) Lowry & G.M.Plunkett (2021)

Synonyms
- Didymopanax tremulus Krug & Urb. (1899); Schefflera tremula (Krug & Urb.) Alain (1985)

Species of plant

Frodinia tremula is a species of plant in the family Araliaceae. It is a scrambling tree endemic to the island of Hispaniola (in the Dominican Republic and Haiti).

== Habitat and ecology ==
Frodinia tremula is the predominant tree in the montane cloud forests of Pic Macaya National Park in the Massif de la Selle of southwestern Haiti. It grows with small trees and shrubs including Garrya fadyenii, Myrsine coriacea, Brunellia comocladiifolia, Persea hypoleuca, Weinmannia pinnata, Cestrum coelophlebium, and Miconia spp., the tree ferns Cyathea harrisii and Alsophila minor, and the climbing bamboo Arthrostylidium haitiense. These cloud forests occur in a mosaic with open forests and savannas of Hispaniolan pine (Pinus occidentalis) above 1,200 meters elevation. Fires kill the young broadleafed trees, and favor the germination of pines.
