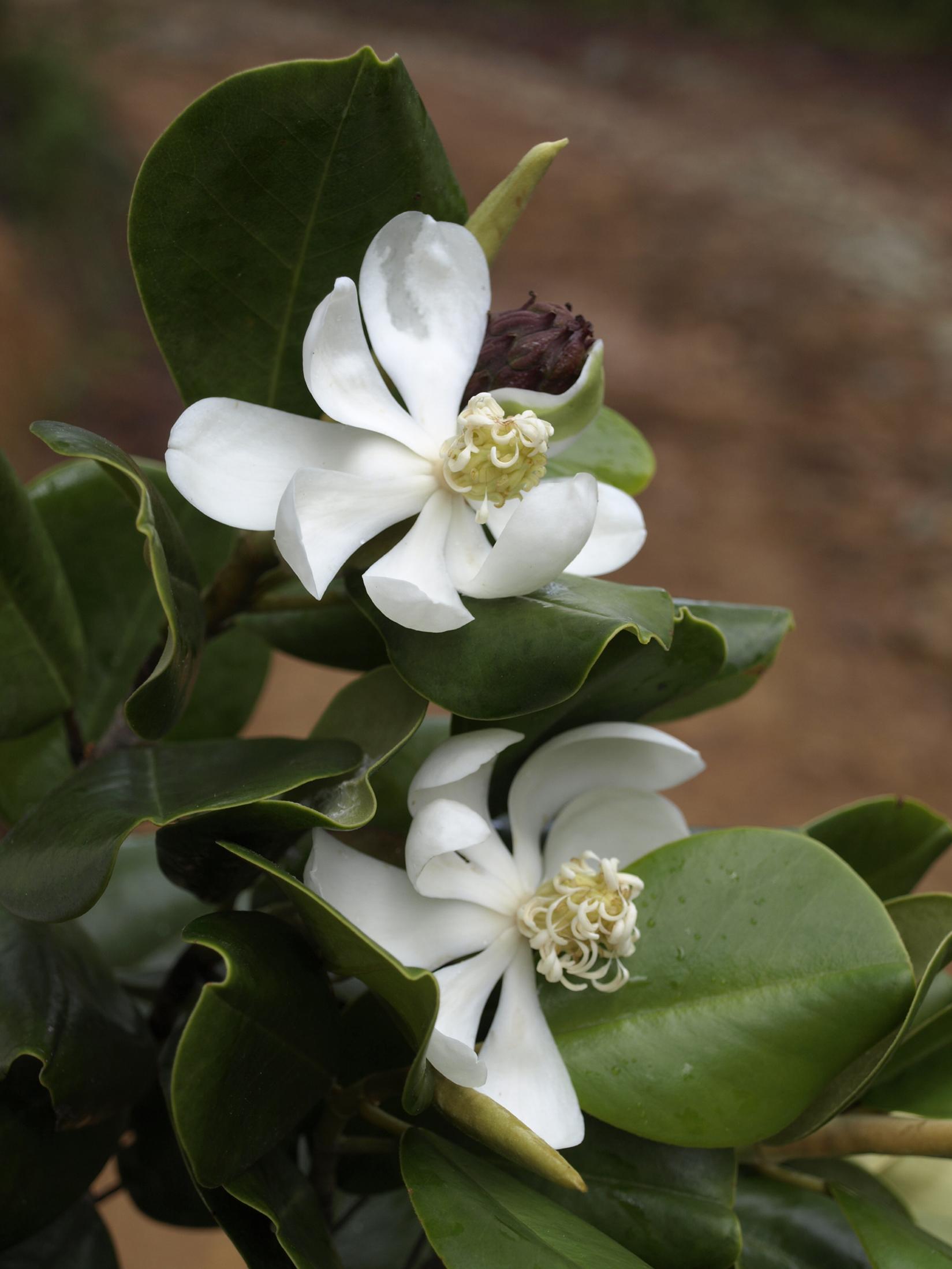

Conservation status
- Endangered (IUCN 3.1)

Scientific classification
- Kingdom: Plantae
- Clade: Embryophytes
- Clade: Tracheophytes
- Clade: Spermatophytes
- Clade: Angiosperms
- Clade: Magnoliids
- Order: Magnoliales
- Family: Magnoliaceae
- Genus: Magnolia
- Section: Magnolia sect. Talauma
- Subsection: Magnolia subsect. Cubenses
- Species: M. pallescens

Binomial name
- Magnolia pallescens Urb. & Ekman

Synonyms
- Dugandiodendron pallescens (Urb. & Ekman) Sima & S.G.Lu

= Magnolia pallescens =

Species of flowering plant

Magnolia pallescens is a species of Magnolia from the Dominican Republic.
