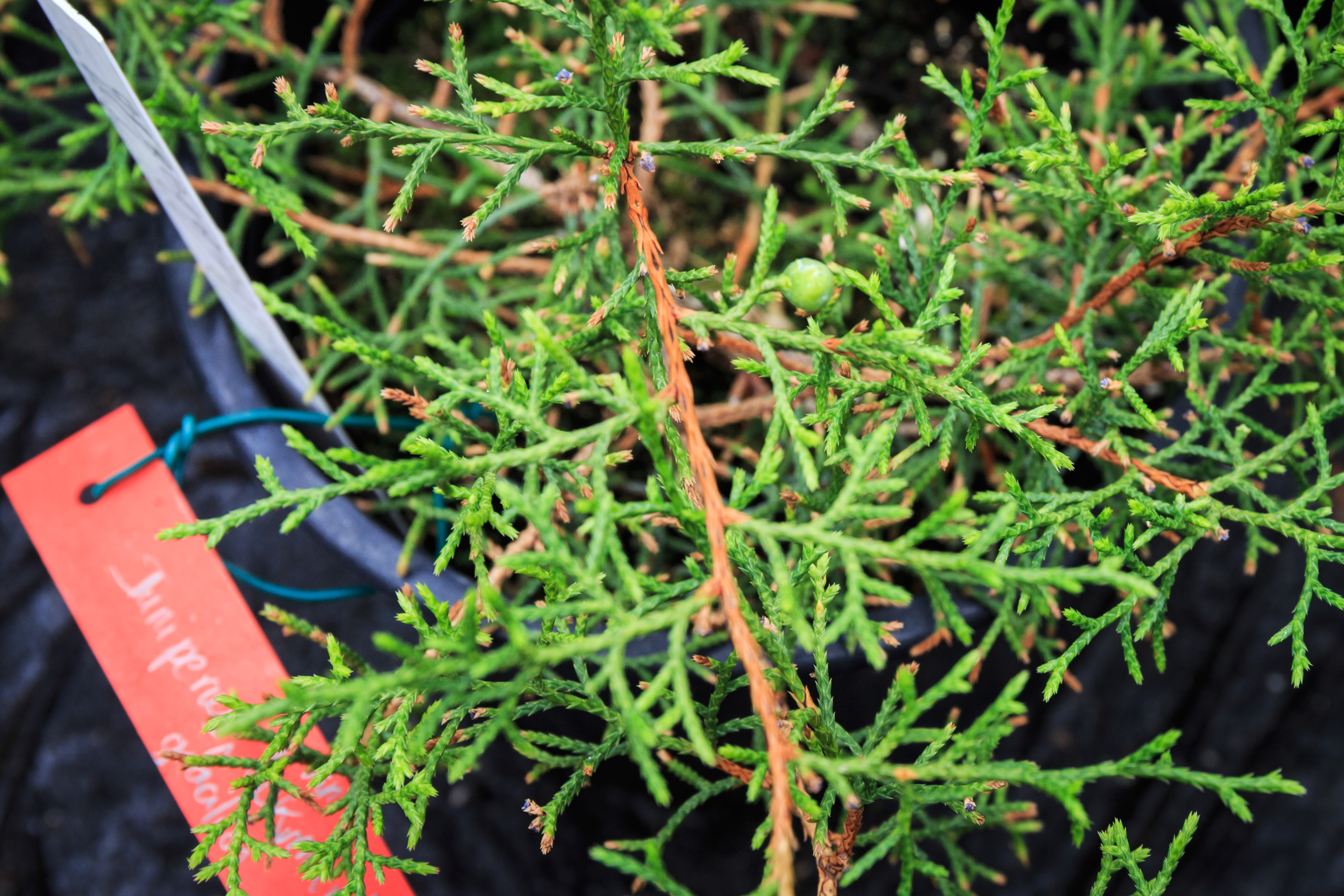

Conservation status
- Endangered (IUCN 3.1)

Scientific classification
- Kingdom: Plantae
- Clade: Tracheophytes
- Clade: Gymnospermae
- Division: Pinophyta
- Class: Pinopsida
- Order: Cupressales
- Family: Cupressaceae
- Genus: Juniperus
- Species: J. gracilior

Binomial name
- Juniperus gracilior Pilg.

Varieties
- Juniperus gracilior var. ekmanii Juniperus gracilior var. gracilior Juniperus gracilior var. urbaniana

= Juniperus gracilior =

Species of conifer

Juniperus gracilior is a species of conifer in the cypress family, Cupressaceae. It is endemic to the Caribbean island of Hispaniola, where there are localized populations in both Haiti and the Dominican Republic.

== Common names ==
Its Spanish-language common name is sabina; its Haitian Creole name is cèdre.

== Taxonomy ==
There are three subspecies; all three are considered rare. The typical variety is known only from a locality near Constanza, Valle del Jaque; var. ekmanii is recorded from Morne la Selle and Morne la Visite, although the latter subpopulation is now thought to be extinct; and var. urbaniana appears to have been reduced to inaccessible areas although viable populations were recorded in 1984 in Pic la Selle.

== Habitat ==
They grow in humid forest habitat alongside palms and ferns.
