= Podocarpus aristulatus =

Scientific classification
- Kingdom: Plantae
- Clade: Tracheophytes
- Clade: Gymnosperms
- Division: Pinophyta
- Class: Pinopsida
- Order: Araucariales
- Family: Podocarpaceae
- Genus: Podocarpus
- Species: P. aristulatus

Binomial name
- Podocarpus aristulatus Parl. in DC.

Species of conifer

Podocarpus aristulatus is a small to medium-sized coniferous tree in the family Podocarpaceae. It is native to the Caribbean islands of Hispaniola and Cuba.

== Description ==
Podocarpus aristulatus grows to 10–20 m tall. The leaves are elliptical to linear, 2–4 cm long and 5–8 mm broad, arranged spirally on the shoots. The seed cones are berry-like, with fleshy red receptacle and one (occasionally two) apical seeds 7–10 mm long.

== Uses ==
In the mountainous regions of the central Dominican Republic, where it is known as "palo de cruz" (or wood of the cross), it is used for axe handles and pestles, because of the durable quality of the wood. Its leaves are used for medicinal teas. As part of the religious beliefs of the area, small pieces are placed above the door frame on the inside of houses as a way of warding off evil spirits.

== Synonymy ==
Synonymy: Nageia aristulata, Podocarpus angustifolius var. aristulatus, Podocarpus angustifolius var. wrightii, Podocarpus buchii, Podocarpus angustifolius subsp. buchii, Podocarpus leonii, Podocarpus angustifolius var. leonii, Podocarpus victorinianus, Podocarpus angustifolius subsp. buchii var. latifolius.
