= Garrya fadyenii =

Conservation status
- Least Concern (IUCN 3.1)

Scientific classification
- Kingdom: Plantae
- Clade: Embryophytes
- Clade: Tracheophytes
- Clade: Angiosperms
- Clade: Eudicots
- Clade: Asterids
- Order: Garryales
- Family: Garryaceae
- Genus: Garrya
- Species: G. fadyenii

Binomial name
- Garrya fadyenii Hook.

Species of plant

Garrya fadyenii is a species of flowering shrub known by the common name Fadyen's silktassel. It is native to the West Indies, specifically Jamaica, Hispaniola, and the former Cuban provinces of Oriente and Santa Clara (Las Villas). It grows in rocky areas of mountainous tropical rainforests.

Along with Vaccinium cubense, it is a principal wide-leaved plant in the Hispaniolan pine forests ecoregion.

== Description ==
Growing up to 8 metres (26 ft) tall, its foliage consists of elliptical-shaped leaves, each around 3 to 7 centimetres (1.2 to 2.8 in) long, which are green and shiny on the upper surface. The shrub is dioecious, with male and female plants producing similarly arranged inflorescences surrounded by lanceolate bracts. The fruit is between 5 and 7 millimetres (0.20 and 0.28 in) long, and turns black when dry.
