= Eucosmophora pithecellobiae =

Scientific classification
- Kingdom: Animalia
- Phylum: Arthropoda
- Clade: Pancrustacea
- Class: Insecta
- Order: Lepidoptera
- Family: Gracillariidae
- Genus: Eucosmophora
- Species: E. pithecellobiae

Binomial name
- Eucosmophora pithecellobiae Davis & Wagner, 2005

Synonyms
- Eucosmophora pithecollobiae (misspelling)

Species of moth

Eucosmophora pithecellobiae is a moth of the family Gracillariidae. It is known from Belize and from Florida in the United States.

The length of the forewings is 3–3.9 mm for males and 3.3–4 mm for females.

The larvae feed on Pithecellobium guadalupense, Pithecellobium macrandrium, and Pithecellobium unguis-cati. They mine the leaves of their host plant.

== Etymology ==
The species name is derived from the generic name, Pithecellobium, of the larval host plant.
