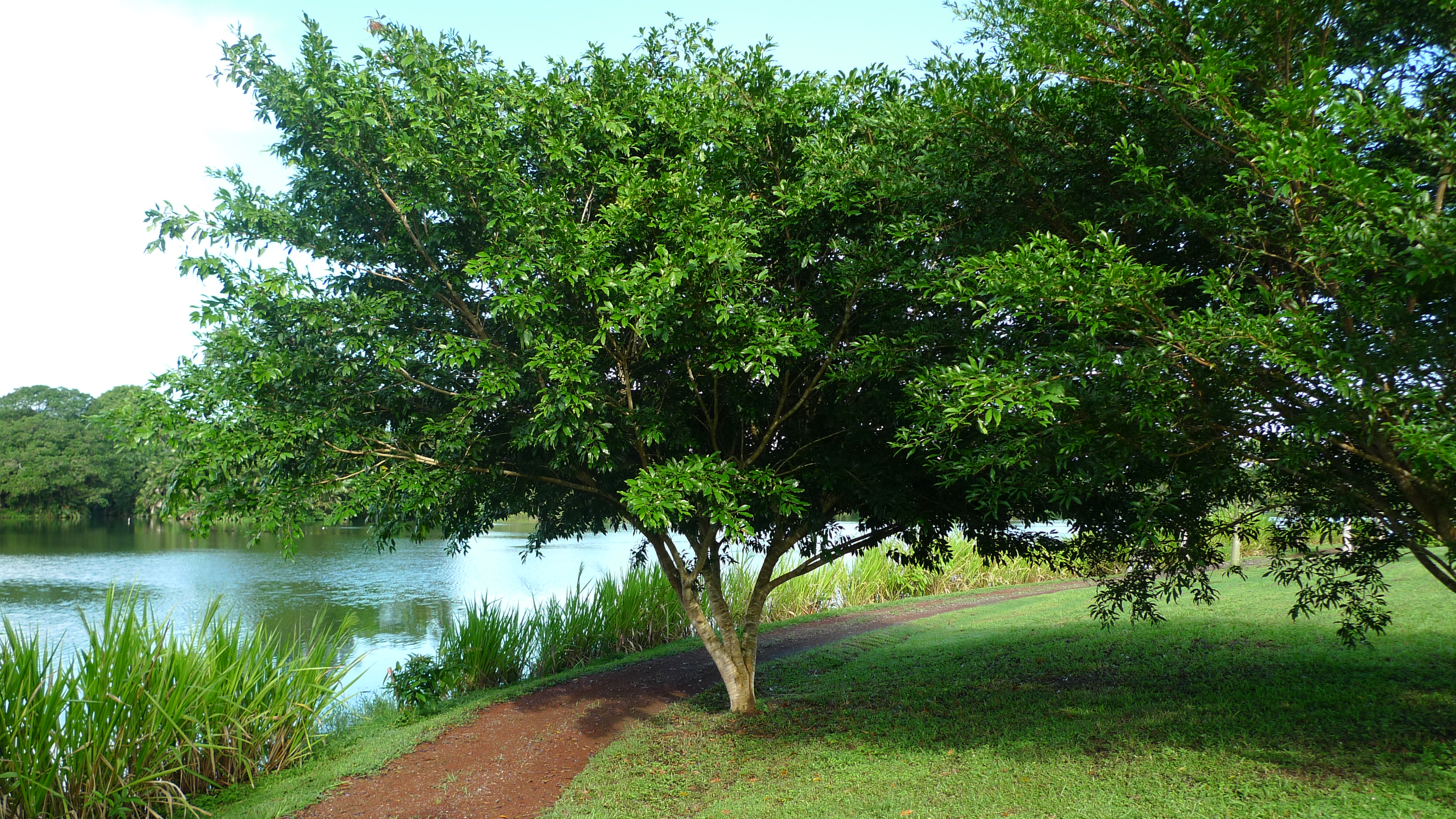
- Zygia latifolia

Scientific classification
- Kingdom: Plantae
- Clade: Tracheophytes
- Clade: Angiosperms
- Clade: Eudicots
- Clade: Rosids
- Order: Fabales
- Family: Fabaceae
- Subfamily: Caesalpinioideae
- Clade: Mimosoid clade
- Genus: Zygia; P.Browne (1756)

Species
- 60; see text

Synonyms
- Marmaroxylon Killip (1940)

= Zygia =

Genus of legumes

Zygia is a genus of flowering plants in the family Fabaceae. It includes 60 species of tres and shrubs native to the tropical Americas, from Southern Mexico and Cuba to northern Argentina. Typical habitats are tropical forest and coastal zones, generally below 900 meters elevation with a few species extending up to 2800 meters. It belongs to the mimosoid clade of the subfamily Caesalpinioideae.

== Species ==
56 species are accepted:

- Zygia ampla (Spruce ex Benth.) Pittier
- Zygia andaquiensis (C.Barbosa) L.Rico
- Zygia bangii Barneby & J.W.Grimes
- Zygia basijuga (Ducke) Barneby & J.W.Grimes
- Zygia biflora L.Rico
- Zygia bifoliola (Rusby) L.Rico
- Zygia bisingula L.Rico
- Zygia brenesii (Standl.) L.Rico
- Zygia cataractae (Kunth) L.Rico
- Zygia cauliflora (Willd.) Killip ex Record
- Zygia claviflora (Spruce ex Benth.) Barneby & J.W.Grimes
- Zygia coccinea (G.Don) L.Rico
  - Zygia coccinea var. coccinea
  - Zygia coccinea var.macrophylla (Spruce ex Benth.) Barneby & J.W.Grimes
  - Zygia coccinea var. oriunda (J.F.Macbr.) Barneby & J.W.Grimes (syn. Zygia oriunda (J.F.Macbr.) L.Rico) (Peru)
- Zygia codonocalyx Barneby & J.W.Grimes
- Zygia cognata (Schltdl.) Britton & Rose (Belize, Guatemala, Honduras)
- Zygia collina (Sandwith) Barneby & J.W.Grimes
- Zygia confusa L.Rico
- Zygia conzattii (Standl.) Britton & Rose
- Zygia cupirensis (C.Barbosa) L.Rico
- Zygia cuspidata Killip ex L.Rico
- Zygia dinizii (Ducke) D.A.Neill et al.
- Zygia dissitiflora Barneby & J.W.Grimes
- Zygia engelsingii (Standl.) Record
- Zygia eperuetorum (Sandwith) Barneby & J.W.Grimes
- Zygia garcia-barrigae (C.Barbosa) Barneby & J.W.Grimes
- Zygia guinetii L.Rico
- Zygia hernandezii (C.Barbosa) L.Rico
- Zygia heteroneura Barneby & J.W.Grimes
- Zygia inaequalis (Humb. & Bonpl. ex Willd.) Pittier
- Zygia juruana (Harms) L.Rico
- Zygia lathetica Barneby & J.W.Grimes
- Zygia latifolia (L.) Fawc. & Rendle
- Zygia lehmannii (Harms) Britton & Rose ex Britton & Killip (Colombia)
- Zygia longifolia (Humb. & Bonpl. ex Willd.) Britton & Rose
- Zygia macbridei (C.Barbosa) L.Rico
- Zygia megistocarpa (C.Barbosa) L.Rico
- Zygia morongii Barneby & J.W.Grimes
- Zygia multipunctata Barneby & J.W.Grimes
- Zygia nubigena B.Ståhl, L.Rico & G.P.Lewis
- Zygia obolingoides L.Rico
- Zygia ocumarensis (Pittier) Barneby & J.W.Grimes
- Zygia odoratissima (Ducke) L.Rico
- Zygia palustris Barneby & J.W.Grimes
- Zygia paucijugata (Lundell) L.Rico
- Zygia peckii (B.L.Rob.) Britton & Rose
- Zygia picramnioides (Standl. ex Killip) Killip ex L.Rico
- Zygia pithecolobioides (Kuntze) Barneby & J.W.Grimes – Granadillo de Río (Argentina, Paraguay)
- Zygia potaroensis Barneby & J.W.Grimes
- Zygia racemosa (Ducke) Barneby & J.W.Grimes
- Zygia rhytidocarpa L.Rico
- Zygia rubiginosa L.Rico & Q.Jiménez
- Zygia selloi (Benth.) L.Rico
- Zygia steyermarkii (Schery) Barneby & J.W.Grimes (Ecuador)
- Zygia tetragona Barneby & J.W.Grimes
- Zygia transamazonica Barneby & J.W.Grimes
- Zygia trunciflora (Ducke) L.Rico
- Zygia turneri (McVaugh) Barneby & J.W.Grimes
- Zygia unifoliolata (Benth.) Pittier
- Zygia vasquezii L.Rico

=== Formerly placed here ===
- Albizia adianthifolia (Schumach.) W.Wight (as Z. fastigiata E.Mey.)
- Albizia petersiana (Bolle) Oliv. (as Z. petersiana Bolle)
- Albizia zygia (DC.) J. F. Macbr. (as Z. brownei Walp.)
- Ebenopsis ebano (Berland.) Barneby & J.W.Grimes (as Z. flexicaulis (Benth.) Sudw.)
- Havardia pallens (Benth.) Britton & Rose (as Z. brevifolia (Benth.) Sudw.)
- Ingopsis inundata (Ducke) Ferm (as Z. inundata (Ducke) H.C.Lima ex Barneby & J.W.Grimes)
- Pithecellobium unguis-cati (L.) Benth. (as Z. unguis-cati (L.) Sudw.)
- Pseudocojoba sabatieri (Barneby & J.W.Grimes) Ferm (as Z. sabatieri Barneby & J.W.Grimes)
