= Eucosmophora sideroxylonella =

Scientific classification
- Domain: Eukaryota
- Kingdom: Animalia
- Phylum: Arthropoda
- Class: Insecta
- Order: Lepidoptera
- Family: Gracillariidae
- Genus: Eucosmophora
- Species: E. sideroxylonella

Binomial name
- Eucosmophora sideroxylonella Busck, 1900

Synonyms
- Acrocercops sideroxylonella; Eucosmophora sideroxylella Meyrick, 1912; Eucosmophora sideroxyloniella (Dyar, [1903])

Species of moth

Eucosmophora sideroxylonella is a moth of the family Gracillariidae. It is known from Cuba and Florida.

The length of the forewings is 3.4 mm for males and 3.8 mm for females.

The larvae feed on Lyonia fruticosa, Dipholis salicifolia, Manilkara jaimiqui, Sideroxylon foetidissimum, Sideroxylon celastrinum and Sideroxylon pallidum. They mine the leaves of their host plant.
