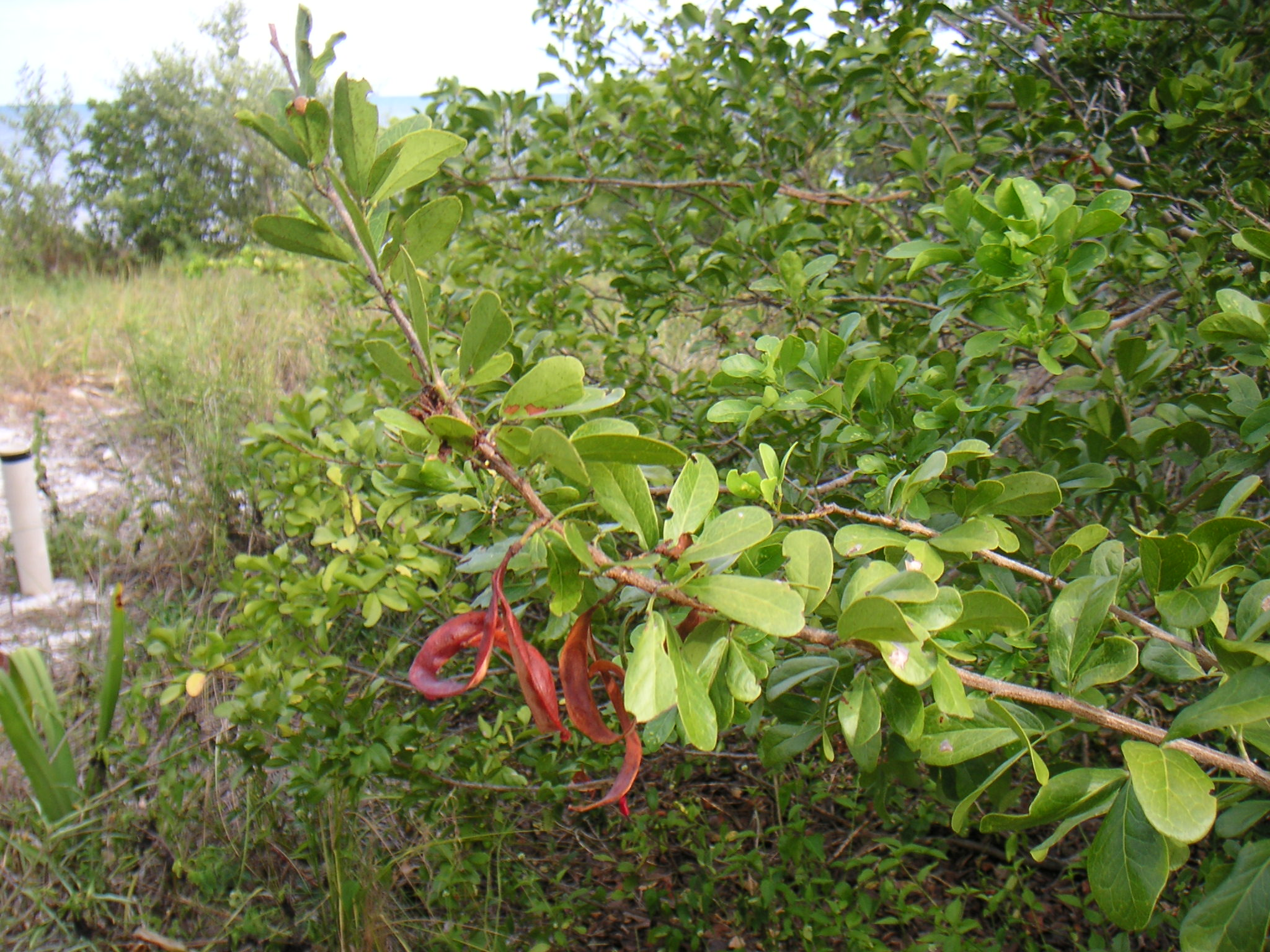
- Pithecellobium keyense

Scientific classification
- Kingdom: Plantae
- Clade: Tracheophytes
- Clade: Angiosperms
- Clade: Eudicots
- Clade: Rosids
- Order: Fabales
- Family: Fabaceae
- Subfamily: Caesalpinioideae
- Clade: Mimosoid clade
- Genus: Pithecellobium; Mart. (1837), nom. cons.

Species
- See text

Synonyms
- Pithecelobium (orth.var.); Pithecollobium Mart.; Pithecolobium (lapsus); Spiroloba Raf. (1838)

= Pithecellobium =

Genus of legumes

Pithecellobium is a genus of flowering plants in the family Fabaceae. It includes approximately 23 species from the tropical Americas, ranging from Mexico to Peru and northern Brazil, including the Caribbean Islands and Florida.

The generic name is derived from the Greek words πίθηκος (pithêkos), meaning "ape" or "monkey," and ἐλλόβιον (ellobion), meaning "earring," which refers to the coiled shape of the fruit pods. Plants of the genus are known generally as blackbeads.

== Species ==
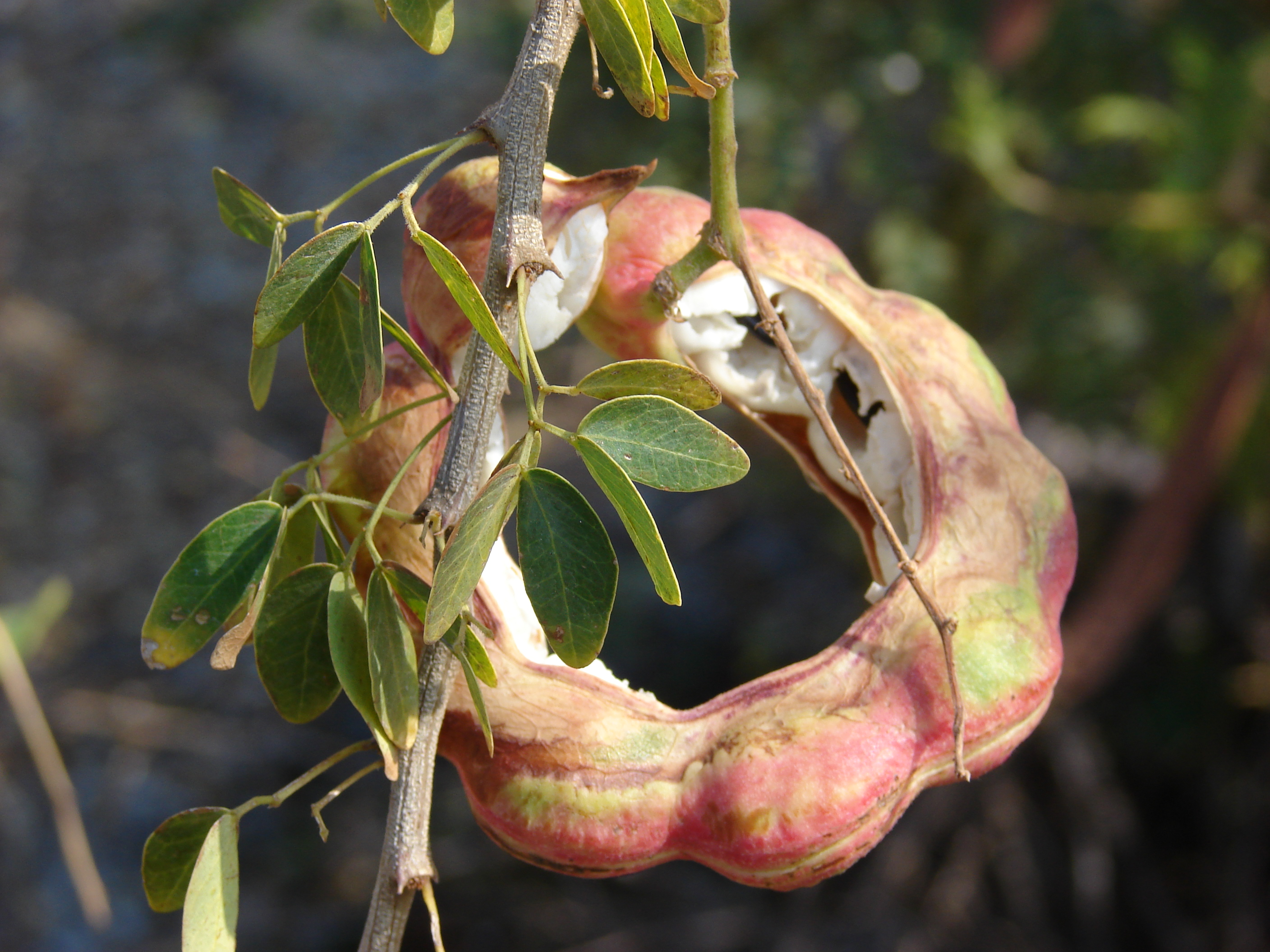
Pithecellobium dulce

23 species are currently accepted:

- Pithecellobium × bahamense Northr. – Bahamas, southern Florida, and northern Cuba
- Pithecellobium bipinnatum L.Rico – Costa Rica
- Pithecellobium circinale (L.) Benth. – Cuba and Hispaniola
- Pithecellobium cynodonticum Barneby & J.W.Grimes – Haiti
- Pithecellobium diversifolium Benth. – northeastern Brazil
- Pithecellobium domingense Alain – Dominican Republic
- Pithecellobium dulce (Roxb.) Benth. – guamúchil, ebony blackbead, monkeypod – Mexico, Central America, northern South America
- Pithecellobium excelsum (Kunth) Mart. – Ecuador and Peru
- Pithecellobium furcatum Benth. – southern Mexico, Guatemala, Belize, and Costa Rica
- Pithecellobium histrix (A.Rich.) Benth. – Bahamas, Cuba, and Dominican Republic
- Pithecellobium hymenaeafolium (Humb. & Bonpl. ex Willd.) Benth. – southern Mexico to Venezuela
- Pithecellobium johansenii Standl. – Belize, Guatemala, and Honduras
- Pithecellobium keyense Coker – Florida Keys blackbead – southern Florida, Bahamas, Turks & Caicos, Cuba, southern Mexico, Guatemala, and Belize
- Pithecellobium lanceolatum (Humb. & Bonpl. ex Willd.) Benth. – Mexico through Central America and Colombia to Venezuela
- Pithecellobium macrandrium Donn.Sm. – southeastern Mexico, Guatemala, and Belize
- Pithecellobium nicoyanum (Britton & Rose) Niezgoda & Nevling – Costa Rica
- Pithecellobium oblongum Benth. – southern Mexico and northern Colombia
- Pithecellobium peckii S.F.Blake – Guatemala and Belize
- Pithecellobium roseum (Vahl) Barneby & J.W.Grimes – buche colorado – Colombia, Venezuela, Guyana, and northern and west-central Brazil
- Pithecellobium striolatum Urb. – Haiti
- Pithecellobium subglobosum Pittier – northeastern Colombia and northwestern Venezuela
- Pithecellobium unguis-cati (L.) Benth. – catclaw blackbead – Mexico, Central America, Caribbean, Colombia, Venezuela, and southern Florida
- Pithecellobium velutinum Britton & Rose – western Mexico (Sinaloa to Michoacán)
- Pithecellobium winzerlingii Britton & Rose – southern Mexico, Belize, and Honduras

=== Formerly placed here ===
Many species now in the genera Albizia, Abarema, Jupunba, and Punjuba were formerly classified in Pithecellobium. Other species previously included:

- Abarema cochliocarpos (as P. cochliocarpum)
- Archidendron bigeminum (as P. bigeminum, P. gracile, P. nicobaricum)
- Chloroleucon foliolosum (as P. foliolosum, P. grisebachianum, P. myriophyllum Malme, P. oligandrum)
- Pseudalbizzia decandra (as P. decandrum)
- Pseudosamanea cubana (as P. bacona)
- Zygia cognata (as P. cognatum, P. stevensonii)
- Zygia pithecolobioides (as P. pithecolobioides, P. reductum)
