= Eucosmophora trimetalla =

Scientific classification
- Kingdom: Animalia
- Phylum: Arthropoda
- Class: Insecta
- Order: Lepidoptera
- Family: Gracillariidae
- Genus: Eucosmophora
- Species: E. trimetalla

Binomial name
- Eucosmophora trimetalla (Meyrick, 1915)

Synonyms
- Acrocercops trimetalla Meyrick, 1915

Species of moth

Eucosmophora trimetalla is a moth of the family Gracillariidae. It is known from Guyana.

The length of the forewings is 3.7 mm for males and females.
