= Zygia lehmannii =

Conservation status
- Vulnerable (IUCN 3.1)

Scientific classification
- Kingdom: Plantae
- Clade: Tracheophytes
- Clade: Angiosperms
- Clade: Eudicots
- Clade: Rosids
- Order: Fabales
- Family: Fabaceae
- Subfamily: Caesalpinioideae
- Clade: Mimosoid clade
- Genus: Zygia
- Species: Z. lehmannii

Binomial name
- Zygia lehmannii (Harms) Britton & Rose ex Britton & Killip

Species of legume

Zygia lehmannii is a species of flowering plant in the family Fabaceae. It is found only in Colombia.
