= Eucosmophora dives =

Scientific classification
- Domain: Eukaryota
- Kingdom: Animalia
- Phylum: Arthropoda
- Class: Insecta
- Order: Lepidoptera
- Family: Gracillariidae
- Genus: Eucosmophora
- Species: E. dives

Binomial name
- Eucosmophora dives Walsingham, 1897

Synonyms
- Acrocercops dives

Species of moth

Eucosmophora dives is a moth of the family Gracillariidae. It is known from Barbados, the British Virgin Islands (Tortola), the Dominican Republic, Grenada and Puerto Rico.

The length of the forewings is 3.3–3.7 mm for males and 3.5–4 mm for females.

The larvae feed on Inga fagifolia, Inga vera and Pithecollobium unguis-cati. They mine the leaves of their host plant.
