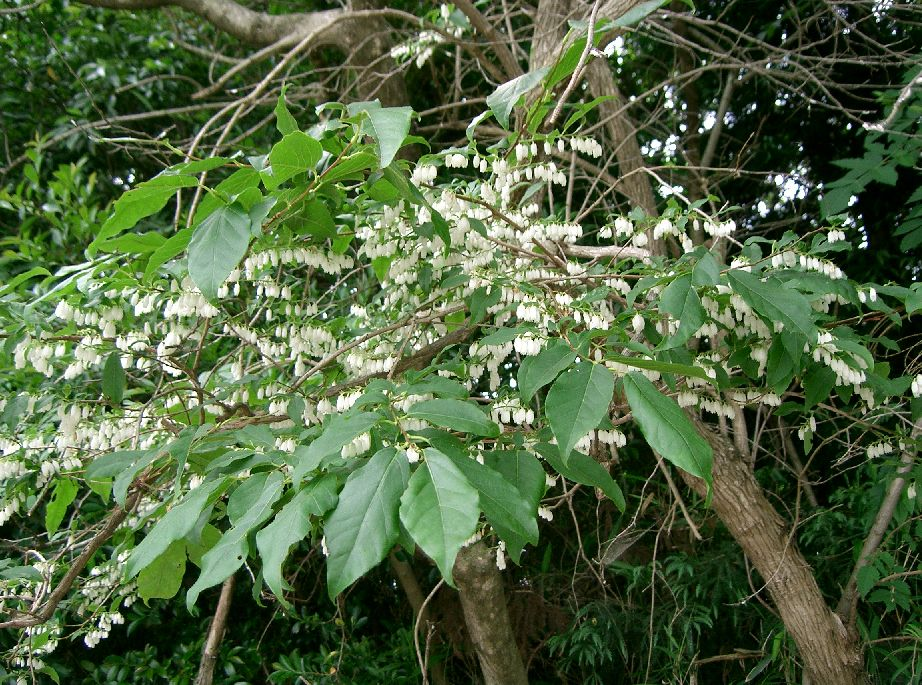
- Lyonia ovalifolia

Scientific classification
- Kingdom: Plantae
- Clade: Embryophytes
- Clade: Tracheophytes
- Clade: Spermatophytes
- Clade: Angiosperms
- Clade: Eudicots
- Clade: Asterids
- Order: Ericales
- Family: Ericaceae
- Subfamily: Vaccinioideae
- Tribe: Lyonieae
- Genus: Lyonia; Nutt.

Synonyms
- Arsenococcus Small; Desmothamnus Small; Neopieris Britton; Xolisma Raf.

= Lyonia (plant) =

Genus of flowering plants

Lyonia is a genus of flowering plants in the family Ericaceae. There are about 39 species native to Asia and North America.

These are shrubs and trees, deciduous or evergreen. Some have rhizomes. The leaves are spirally arranged and the inflorescences grow in the leaf axils. The flowers are usually white, sometimes red. The fruit is a capsule.

== Fossil record ==
37 fossil fruits of †Lyonia danica have been described from middle Miocene strata of the Fasterholt area near Silkeborg in Central Jutland, Denmark.

== Species ==
39 species are accepted.

- Lyonia affinis (A.Rich.) Urb.
- Lyonia alainii Judd
- Lyonia alpina Urb. & Ekman
- Lyonia buchii Urb.
- Lyonia chapaensis (Dop) Merr.
- Lyonia compta (W.W.Sm. & Jeffrey) Hand.-Mazz.
- Lyonia doyonensis (Hand.-Mazz.) Hand.-Mazz.
- Lyonia ekmanii Urb.
- Lyonia elliptica (Small) Alain
- Lyonia ferruginea (Walter) Nutt.
- Lyonia fruticosa (Michx.) G.S.Torr. ex B.L.Rob.
- Lyonia glandulosa (A.Rich.) Griseb.
- Lyonia heptamera Urb.
- Lyonia jamaicensis (Sw.) D.Don
- Lyonia latifolia (A.Rich.) Griseb.
- Lyonia ligustrina (L.) DC.
- Lyonia lippoldii R.Berazaín & Bisse
- Lyonia longipes Urb.
- Lyonia lucida (Lam.) K.Koch
- Lyonia macrocalyx (J.Anthony) Airy Shaw
- Lyonia macrophylla (Britton) Ekman ex Urb.
- Lyonia maestrensis Acuña & Roíg
- Lyonia mariana (L.) D.Don
- Lyonia microcarpa Urb. & Ekman
- Lyonia myrtilloides Griseb.
- Lyonia nipensis Urb.
- Lyonia obtusa Griseb.
- Lyonia octandra (Sw.) Griseb.
- Lyonia ovalifolia (Wall.) Drude
- Lyonia rubiginosa (Pers.) G.Don
- Lyonia santiagoana Bécquer & Berazaín
- Lyonia squamulosa M.Martens & Galeotti
- Lyonia stahlii Urb.
- Lyonia tinensis Urb.
- Lyonia trinidadensis Judd
- Lyonia truncata Urb.
- Lyonia tuerckheimii Urb.
- Lyonia urbaniana (Sleumer) J.Jiménez Alm.
- Lyonia villosa (Hook.f. ex C.B.Clarke) Hand.-Mazz.
