= Eucosmophora =

Scientific classification
- Domain: Eukaryota
- Kingdom: Animalia
- Phylum: Arthropoda
- Class: Insecta
- Order: Lepidoptera
- Family: Gracillariidae
- Subfamily: Acrocercopinae
- Genus: Eucosmophora; Walsingham, 1897

Species
- See text

Genus of moths

Eucosmophora is a genus of moths in the family Gracillariidae.

== Species ==
- Eucosmophora aspila Davis & Wagner, 2005
- Eucosmophora atlantis (Meyrick, 1924)
- Eucosmophora chrysocosma (Meyrick, 1915)
- Eucosmophora dives Walsingham, 1897
- Eucosmophora echinulata Davis & Wagner, 2005
- Eucosmophora eclampsis (Durrant, 1914)
- Eucosmophora eurychalca (Meyrick, 1920)
- Eucosmophora ingae Davis & Wagner, 2005
- Eucosmophora manilkarae Davis & Wagner, 2005
- Eucosmophora melanactis (Meyrick, 1915)
- Eucosmophora paraguayensis Davis & Wagner, 2005
- Eucosmophora pithecollobiae Davis & Wagner, 2005
- Eucosmophora pouteriae Davis & Wagner, 2005
- Eucosmophora prolata Davis & Wagner, 2005
- Eucosmophora schinusivora D.R. Davis & Wheeler, 2011
- Eucosmophora sideroxylonella Busck, 1900
- Eucosmophora trimetalla (Meyrick, 1915)
