= Eucosmophora ingae =

Scientific classification
- Kingdom: Animalia
- Phylum: Arthropoda
- Class: Insecta
- Order: Lepidoptera
- Family: Gracillariidae
- Genus: Eucosmophora
- Species: E. ingae

Binomial name
- Eucosmophora ingae Davis & Wagner, 2005

Species of moth

Eucosmophora ingae is a moth of the family Gracillariidae. It is known from Costa Rica.

The length of the forewings is 3.1-3.6 mm for males and 3.1-3.4 mm for females.

The larvae feed on Inga oerstediana and Pithecollobium catenatum. They mine the leaves of their host plant.

== Etymology ==
The species name is derived from the generic name, Inga, of the larval host plant.
