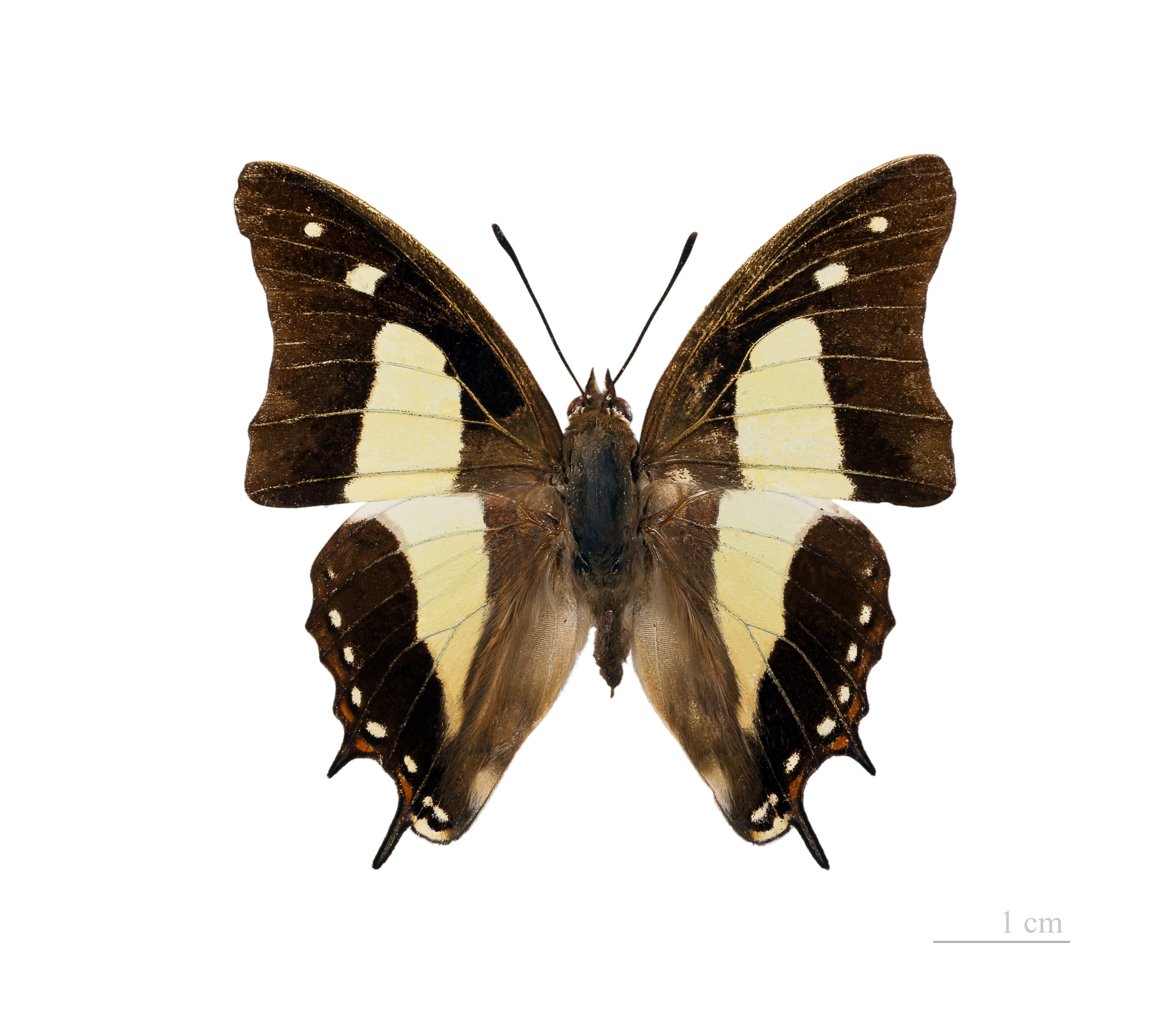
- P. a. attalus dorsal side
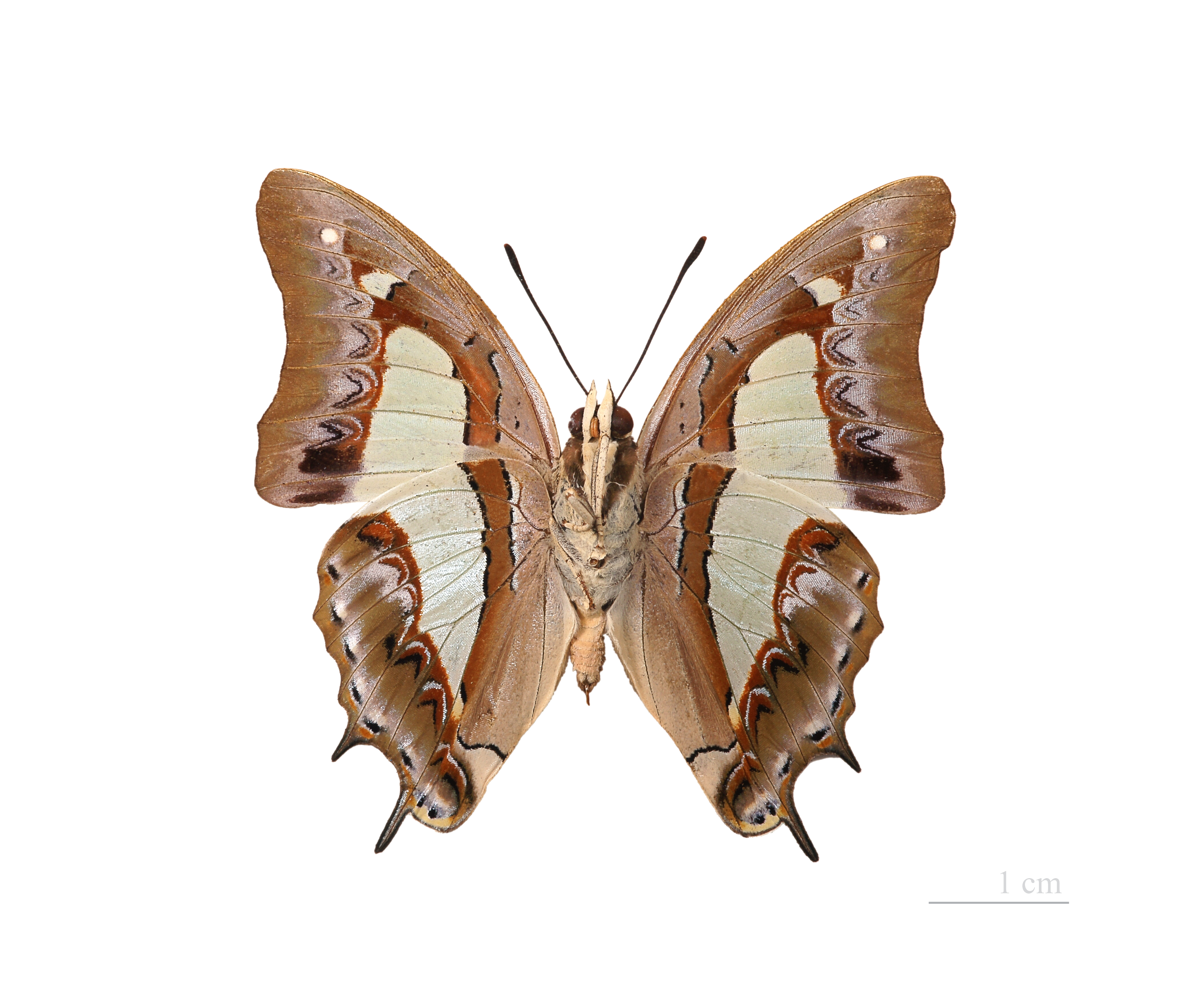
- P. a. attalus ventral side

Scientific classification
- Kingdom: Animalia
- Phylum: Arthropoda
- Clade: Pancrustacea
- Class: Insecta
- Order: Lepidoptera
- Family: Nymphalidae
- Genus: Polyura
- Species: P. athamas

Binomial name
- Polyura athamas (Drury) 1773

Synonyms
- Polyura samatha Moore, [1879]; Charaxes bharata Felder & Felder, 1867

= Polyura athamas =

Common nawab

Species of butterfly

Polyura athamas, the common nawab, is a species of fast-flying canopy butterfly found in tropical Asia. It belongs to the Charaxinae (rajahs and nawabs) in the brush-footed butterfly family (Nymphalidae).

It occurs in the Himalayas from Kashmir to Sikkim, the hills of central India and the Eastern Ghats, the Western Ghats and southern India, Sri Lanka, Assam, Cachar, and via Myanmar, Cambodia and the Tenasserim Hills far into Indonesia. In August 2016 a specimen was spotted and caught in Palawan, Philippines.

== Description ==
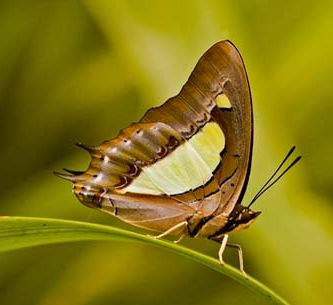

Male and female. Upperside black. Forewings and hindwings with a discal broad transverse area from below vein 4 in forewing to vein 2 on hindwing, a moderately large spot in interspace 5, a minute preapical dot beyond in interspace 6 on forewing, and a subterminal row of spots with two or three spots beyond them on the tornal angle of the hindwing, pale yellow, sometimes with an ochraceous, sometimes with a greenish tinge.

The discal area on the forewing is nearly as broad in interspace 3 as on the dorsum, on the hindwing narrowing to an acute point on vein 2 at two-thirds of its length from the base of the wing. Tails are touched with bluish grey. Underside with the discal transverse area and spot in interspace 5 as on the upperside; base and costal margin of the forewing to apex, and base and dorsal margin of the hindwing broadly lilacine brown, on the forewing with two small black spots near the base.

Bordering the transverse discal area on the inner side, where it is margined with black lines, and above, is a broad chocolate carved band, continued more narrowly along the outer side of the discal area; beyond this on the forewing is a concave series of dusky black lunules, on the hindwing the band itself is traversed by a line of obscure pale lunules; finally on the hindwing there is a subterminal series of internally white-bordered black spots followed by an obscure ochraceous terminal line, and above the tornal angle a slender transverse black line from vein 1 to the dorsal margin.

Wingspan 64–85 mm.

=== Variation ===
"The species exhibits considerable seasonal variation, especially in South and North India; for we find that the specimens obtained in March and April in North and North-west India have the discal band much widened and the underside pale, while the individuals flying in May and June have the band narrower, and those found in Sikkim from August to November have it narrowest.

In South India there are two well-distinguished forms, the one corresponding to the spring form of North India, but with the band less broad and representing most likely the dry-season brood. Respectively, a form that inhabits dry districts, and the second having the band narrower and the underside brighter in tint. In Burma broad-banded, pale specimens occur also, besides narrow-banded ones. The differences exhibited by the pale and the narrow-banded forms have often been treated as being of specific value; for instance, the pale South Indian form has been described as E. agrarius, while the darker form is referred to as E. samatha; the North Indian spring form has been designated as E. hamasta, the form May to June as E. bharata, and the summer form as E. athama.

As the species is so susceptible to climatical differences, it is self-evident that the individuals caught in the same month at the same locality, but in different years, are not always identical in the width of the band, and that, further, in different localities of the same country one may meet with somewhat different forms of athamas in one year, and identical forms in another year. This one must bear in mind in working with the individuals of athamas from a certain country."

"Messrs. Rothschild and Jordan in their monograph of Charaxes and allied Prionopterous genera divide the forms of athamas (then placed in genus Eulepis) occurring within our limits into two subspecies—(1) E. athamas athamas, the Northern and Eastern race, with three seasonal forms; and (2) E. athamas agrarius, the Southern Indian and Ceylon race, with two seasonal forms. The differences between the subspecies seem not to be sufficient to necessitate detailed descriptions in the present work. Following Messrs. Rothschild and Jordan, I keep, with much doubt, however, the next form separate from athamas, of which it is possibly only a dimorph."

C. & R. Felder described Charaxes bharata in 1867 which was later considered a synonym of this species. A molecular phylogenetic work (Toussaint et al. 2015) has suggested this to be a distinct species.

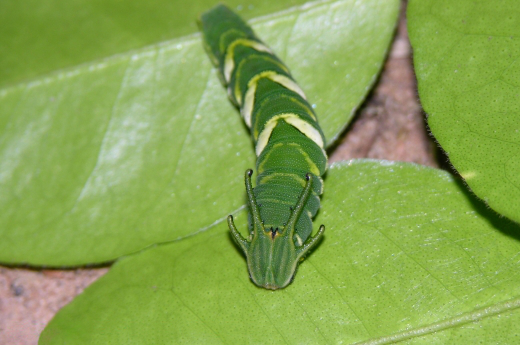
Caterpillar

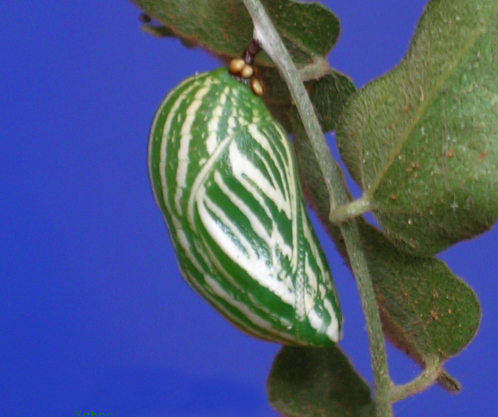
Pupa

=== Caterpillar ===
"Elongated, slug-shaped, dark green; head large, wide and surmounted by four divergent curved fleshy spinous processes; anal segment with two short naked terminal points; the segments with an oblique yellowish-white lateral stripe, most prominent on the 7th, 9th and 11th segments, and beneath these a lower series of small white spots." (Moore.) The caterpillars are popularly known as "Dragon-headed Caterpillars" because of the shape of the "horns".

=== Pupa ===
"Thick, cylindrically oval; green streaked with white; dorsum and thorax convex; head broad, truncated, obtusely pointed in front." (Moore.)

== Ecology ==
Eggs are laid on various species of Fabaceae plants. These include acacias such as A. caesia, A. catechu (black cutch) and A. farnesiana (needle bush), Adenanthera pavonina, Albizia species such as A. chinensis, A. corniculata, A. julibrissin (nemu tree) and A. lebbeck (siris or lebbeck), Caesalpinia species such as C. bonduc, C. major and C. regia, Delonix regia (gulmohar), Grewia species, Leucaena leucocephala (white popinac), Peltophorum pterocarpum (copperpod), Pithecellobium clypearia and Pithecellobium dulce (monkeypod).

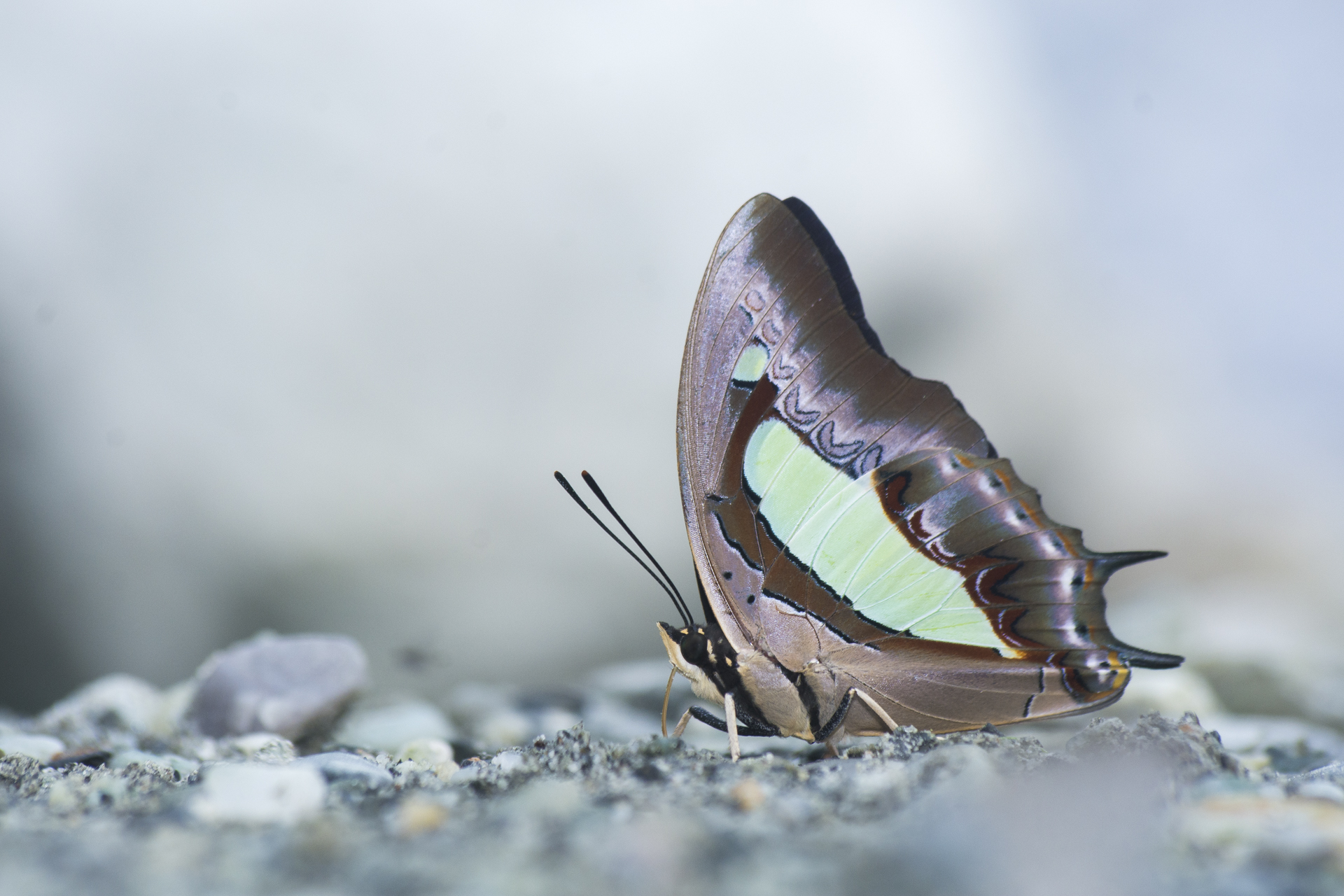
Common nawab puddling in Buxa Tiger Reserve.

At least on Borneo but probably elsewhere too, adults do generally not visit carrion or old fruit to drink liquids.

== See also ==
- Anomalous common nawab (Polyura agraria, now Charaxes agrarius)
