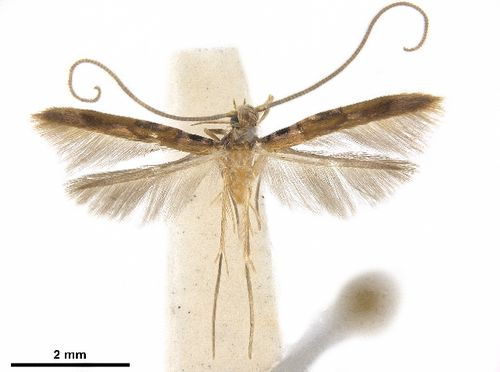

Scientific classification
- Kingdom: Animalia
- Phylum: Arthropoda
- Clade: Pancrustacea
- Class: Insecta
- Order: Lepidoptera
- Family: Gracillariidae
- Genus: Eucosmophora
- Species: E. manilkarae

Binomial name
- Eucosmophora manilkarae Davis & Wagner, 2005

= Eucosmophora manilkarae =

Species of moth

Eucosmophora manilkarae is a moth of the family Gracillariidae. It is known from Florida and Texas in the United States.

The length of the forewings is 3.3–3.5 mm for males and 3–4 mm for females.
