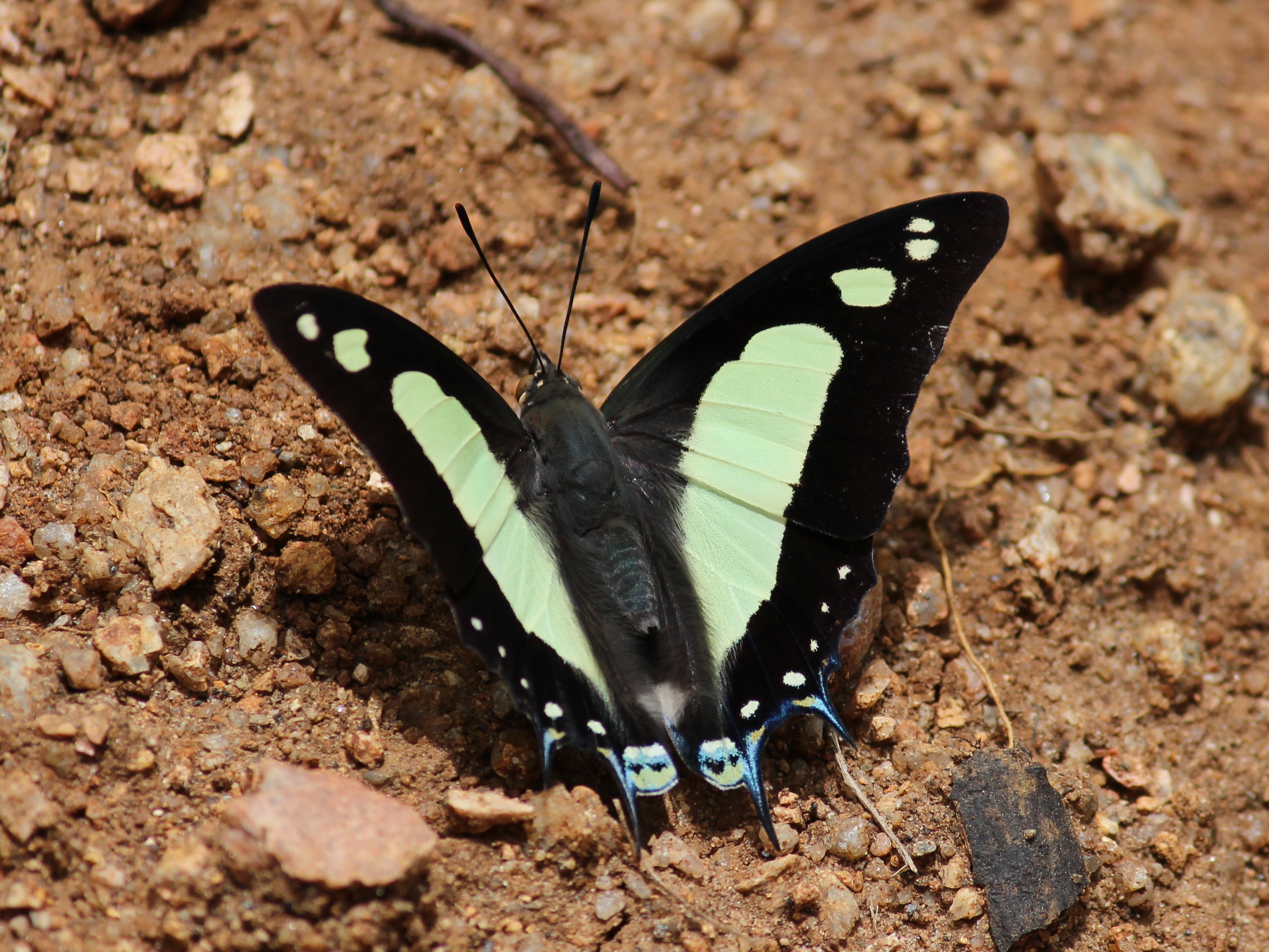
- Dorsal view
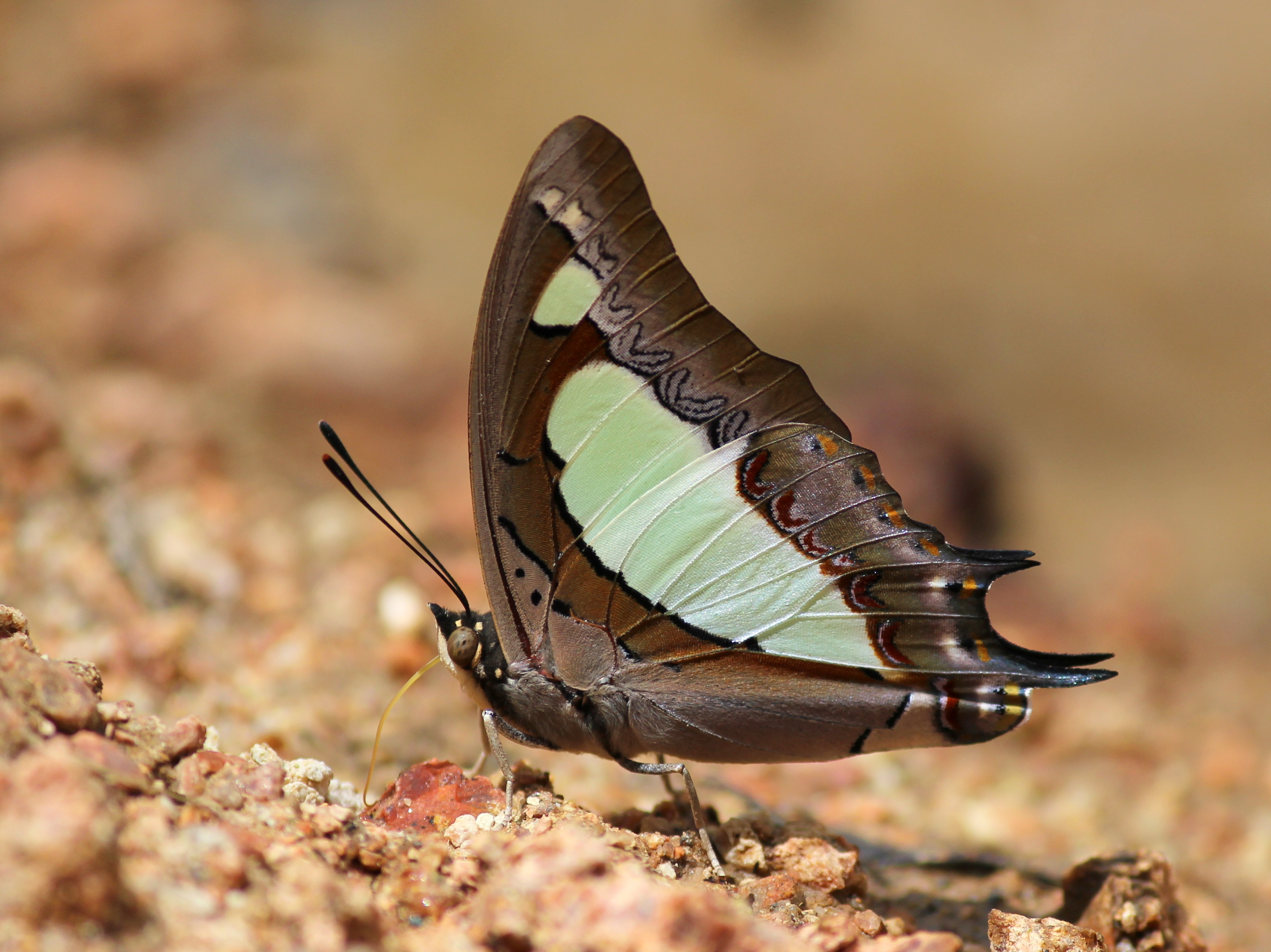
- Ventral view, Karnataka, India

Scientific classification
- Domain: Eukaryota
- Kingdom: Animalia
- Phylum: Arthropoda
- Class: Insecta
- Order: Lepidoptera
- Family: Nymphalidae
- Genus: Charaxes
- Species: C. agrarius

Binomial name
- Charaxes agrarius C. Swinhoe, 1887

Synonyms
- Charaxes agraria; Polyura agraria; Polyura athamas agraria

= Charaxes agrarius =

Anomalous nawab

Species of butterfly

Charaxes agrarius, the anomalous nawab, is a butterfly found in Asia that belongs to the rajahs and nawabs group, that is, the Charaxinae subfamily of the brush-footed butterflies family. The name is based on their resemblance to the common nawab (Polyura athamas), which was described before the discovery of this species.

== Description ==
Male and female: Both wings with the yellow discal band uniformly narrower, the outer edge of the band more irregular, undulated, the portions between the medians being each somewhat incurved. Forewing with a large quadrate lower submarginal spot and two small superposed apical spots. Hindwing with yellowish-white rounded submarginal spots, the upper minute, the lower three large and dento-lunate; marginal ochreous lunules not present in the male, very indistinct in female, the lower bluish-grey streaks only present in male. Underside similar to Polyura athamas, but paler.

— Frederic Moore, Lepidoptera Indica: Volume II

== See also ==
- Polyura athamas
- List of butterflies of India (Nymphalidae)
