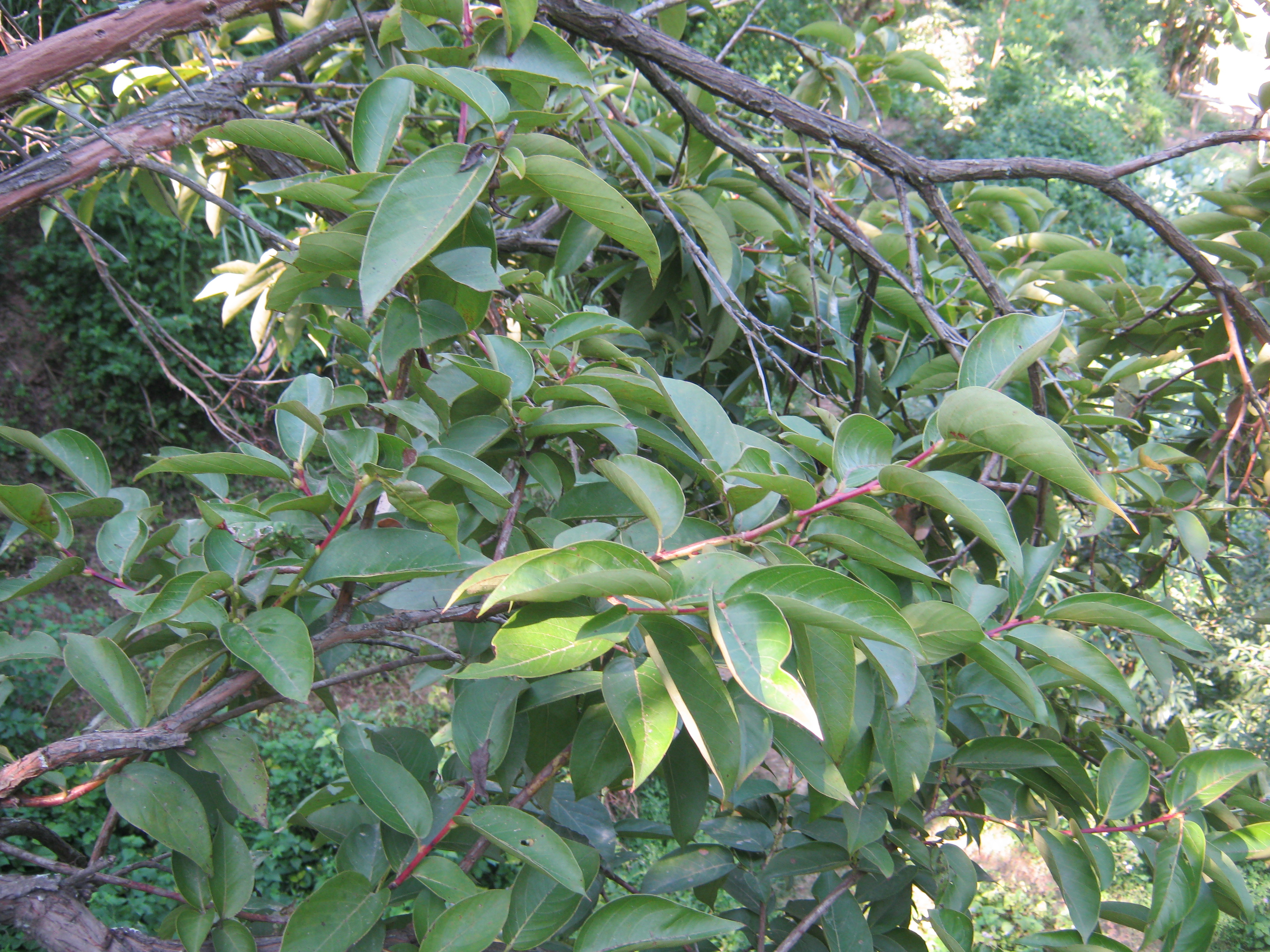
- Lyonia ovalifolia found in Panchkhal, Nepal

Scientific classification
- Kingdom: Plantae
- Clade: Embryophytes
- Clade: Tracheophytes
- Clade: Angiosperms
- Clade: Eudicots
- Clade: Asterids
- Order: Ericales
- Family: Ericaceae
- Genus: Lyonia
- Species: L. ovalifolia

Binomial name
- Lyonia ovalifolia (Wall.) Drude(1897)

= Lyonia ovalifolia =

Species of plant

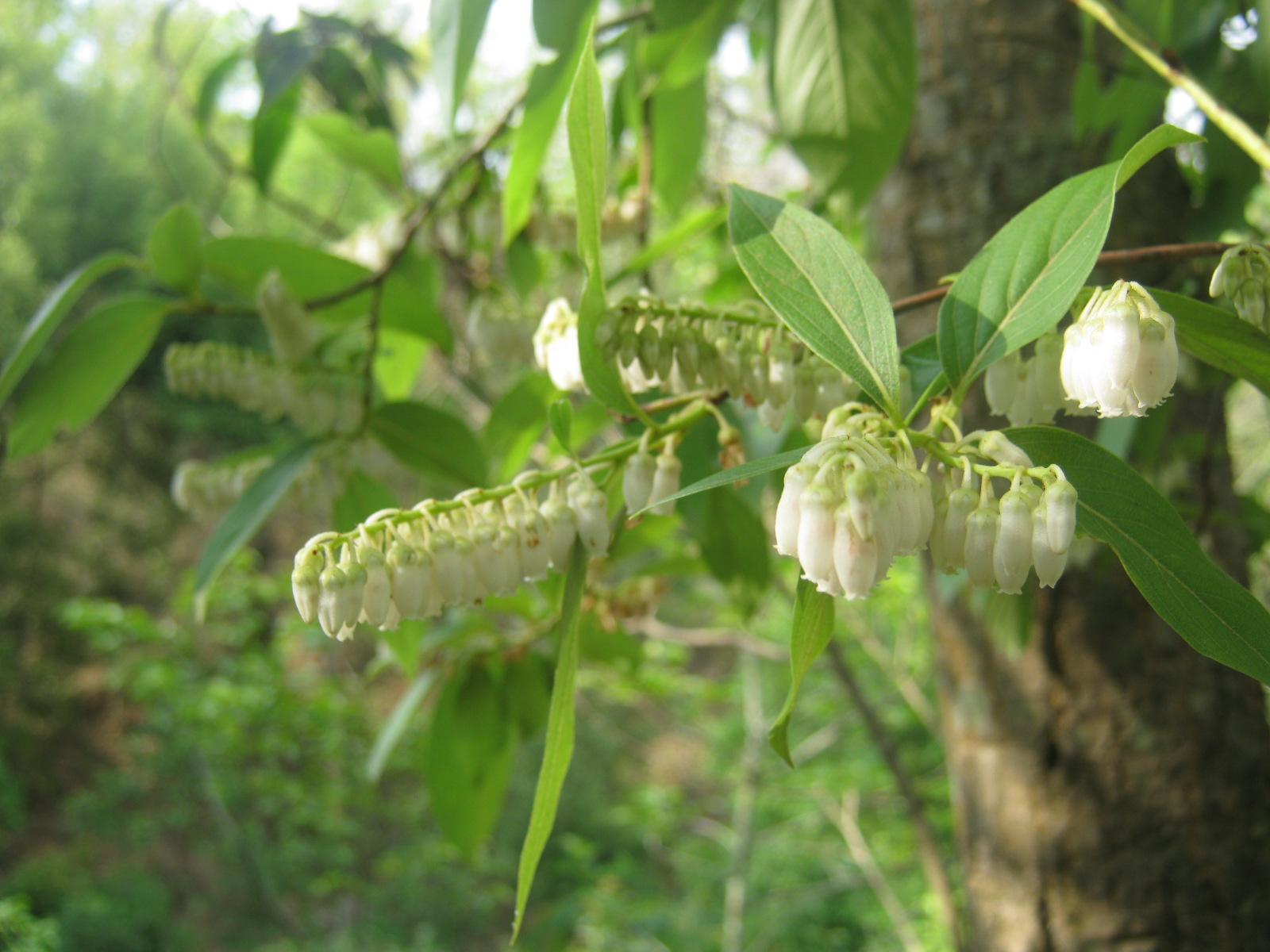
Lyonia ovalifolia flowers during May in Panchkhal, Nepal.

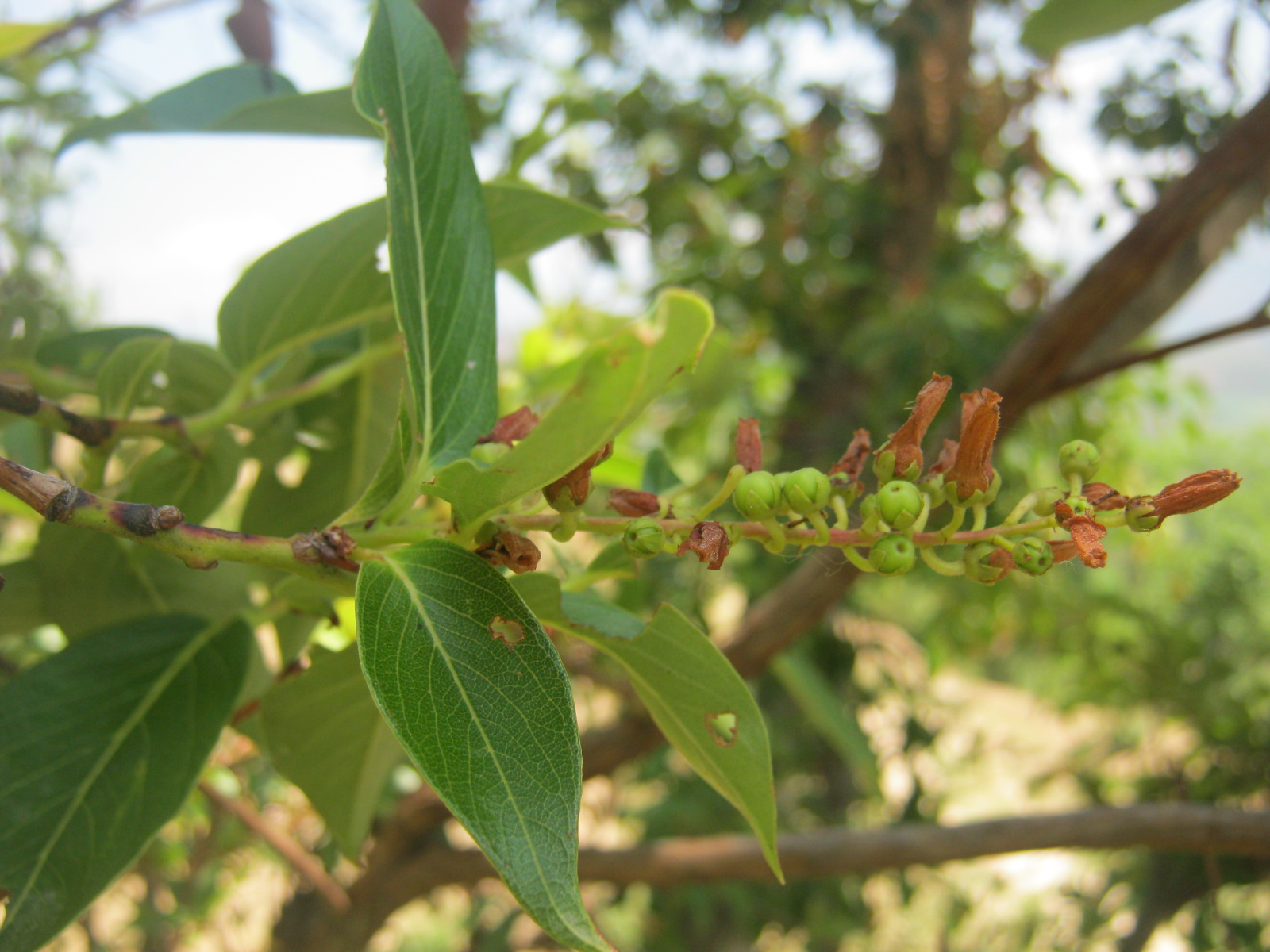
Lyonia ovalifolia fruits

Lyonia ovalifolia is a species of plant in the family Ericaceae. This plant is Native to Himalaya, Nepal, China, Japan, Cambodia, Myanmar, Thailand, Vietnam and Malaysia. It is known as Anyaar in India and Angeri in Nepal.

== Poisoning ==
One case of poisoning by this plant has been described.
