= Eucosmophora paraguayensis =

Scientific classification
- Kingdom: Animalia
- Phylum: Arthropoda
- Class: Insecta
- Order: Lepidoptera
- Family: Gracillariidae
- Genus: Eucosmophora
- Species: E. paraguayensis

Binomial name
- Eucosmophora paraguayensis Davis & Wagner, 2005

Species of moth

Eucosmophora paraguayensis is a moth of the family Gracillariidae. It is known from Paraguay.

The length of the forewings is 3.0–3.7 mm for males.

The larvae probably feed on a Sapotaceae species and probably mine the leaves of their host plant.
