= Eucosmophora pouteriae =

Scientific classification
- Kingdom: Animalia
- Phylum: Arthropoda
- Class: Insecta
- Order: Lepidoptera
- Family: Gracillariidae
- Genus: Eucosmophora
- Species: E. pouteriae

Binomial name
- Eucosmophora pouteriae Davis & Wagner, 2005

Species of moth

Eucosmophora pouteriae is a moth of the family Gracillariidae. It is known from Costa Rica.

The length of the forewings is 3.2–3.6 mm for males and 3.7 mm for females.

The larvae feed on Pouteria campechiana. They mine the leaves of their host plant.

== Etymology ==
The specific name is derived from the generic name, Pouteria, of the only recorded larval host.
