= Eucosmophora echinulata =

Scientific classification
- Kingdom: Animalia
- Phylum: Arthropoda
- Class: Insecta
- Order: Lepidoptera
- Family: Gracillariidae
- Genus: Eucosmophora
- Species: E. echinulata

Binomial name
- Eucosmophora echinulata Davis & Wagner, 2005

Species of moth

Eucosmophora echinulata is a moth of the family Gracillariidae. It is known from Paraguay.

The length of the forewings is 4.1 mm for females.

The larvae probably feed on a Fabaceae species and probably mine the leaves of their host plant.
