= Eucosmophora eurychalca =

Scientific classification
- Kingdom: Animalia
- Phylum: Arthropoda
- Class: Insecta
- Order: Lepidoptera
- Family: Gracillariidae
- Genus: Eucosmophora
- Species: E. eurychalca

Binomial name
- Eucosmophora eurychalca (Meyrick, 1920)

Synonyms
- Acrocercops eurychalca Meyrick, 1920

Species of moth

Eucosmophora eurychalca is a moth of the family Gracillariidae. It is known from Brazil.

The length of the forewings is 3 mm for males.
