= Lyonia maestrensis =

Conservation status
- Endangered (IUCN 3.1)

Scientific classification
- Kingdom: Plantae
- Clade: Tracheophytes
- Clade: Angiosperms
- Clade: Eudicots
- Clade: Asterids
- Order: Ericales
- Family: Ericaceae
- Genus: Lyonia
- Species: L. maestrensis

Binomial name
- Lyonia maestrensis Acuña & Roíg

Species of flowering plant

Lyonia maestrensis is a species of flowering plant in the family Ericaceae. It is a shrub or tree endemic to eastern Cuba. It is native to the Sierra Maestra of Santiago de Cuba Province, where it grows in montane moist forest above 1,100 metres elevation.
