= Eucosmophora atlantis =

Scientific classification
- Kingdom: Animalia
- Phylum: Arthropoda
- Class: Insecta
- Order: Lepidoptera
- Family: Gracillariidae
- Genus: Eucosmophora
- Species: E. atlantis

Binomial name
- Eucosmophora atlantis (Meyrick, 1924)

Synonyms
- Acrocercops atlantis Meyrick, 1924; Acrocercops atalantis

Species of moth

Eucosmophora atlantis is a moth of the family Gracillariidae. It is known from Costa Rica.

The length of the forewings is 3.6–4.5 mm for males and 4-4.8 mm. for females.

The larvae probably feed on a Sapotaceae species and probably mine the leaves of their host plant.
