= Eucosmophora aspila =

Scientific classification
- Kingdom: Animalia
- Phylum: Arthropoda
- Class: Insecta
- Order: Lepidoptera
- Family: Gracillariidae
- Genus: Eucosmophora
- Species: E. aspila

Binomial name
- Eucosmophora aspila Davis & Wagner, 2005

Species of moth

Eucosmophora aspila is a moth of the family Gracillariidae. It is known from Brazil and Peru.

The length of the forewings is 3.3 mm for males and 3.5 for females.
