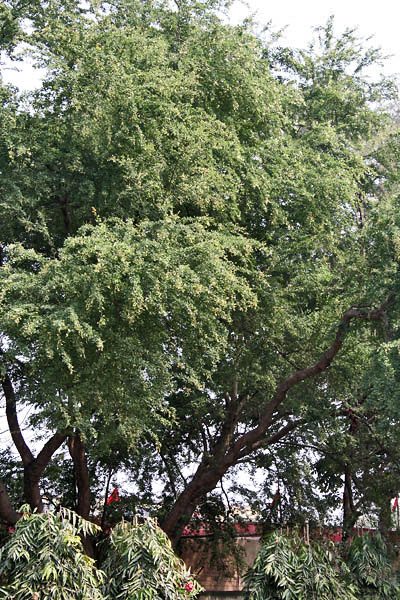
- In Kolkata, West Bengal (India)
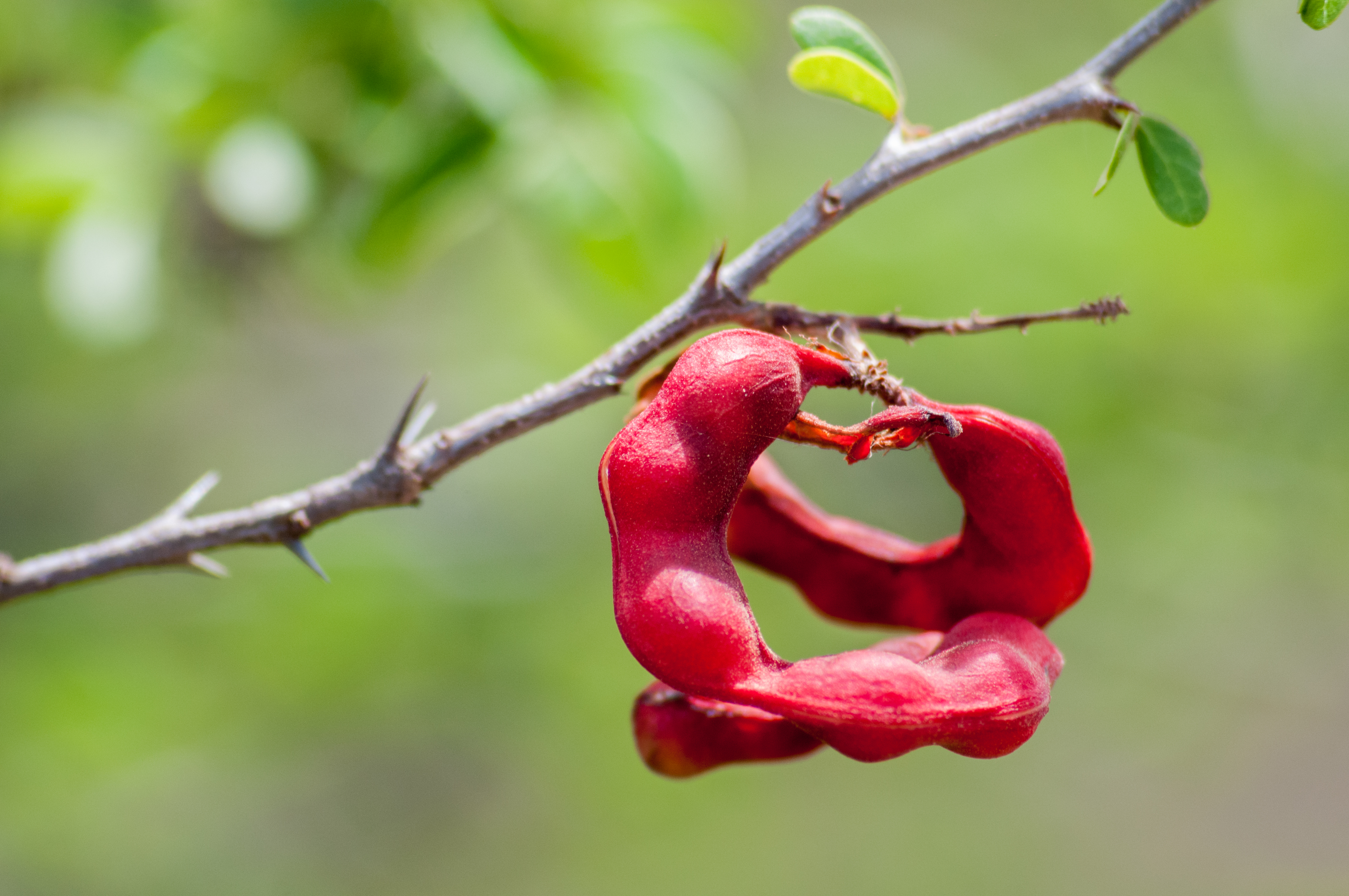
- Ripe Pithecellobium dulce bean

Conservation status
- Least Concern (IUCN 3.1)

- Secure (NatureServe)

Scientific classification
- Kingdom: Plantae
- Clade: Tracheophytes
- Clade: Angiosperms
- Clade: Eudicots
- Clade: Rosids
- Order: Fabales
- Family: Fabaceae
- Subfamily: Caesalpinioideae
- Clade: Mimosoid clade
- Genus: Pithecellobium
- Species: P. dulce

Binomial name
- Pithecellobium dulce (Roxb.) Benth.

= Pithecellobium dulce =

Species of flowering plant

Pithecellobium dulce, commonly known as Manila tamarind, Madras thorn, monkeypod tree or camachile, is a species of flowering plant in the pea family, Fabaceae, that is native to the Pacific Coast and adjacent highlands of Mexico, Central America, and northern South America. It is also sometimes known as monkeypod, but that name is also used for several other plants, including Samanea saman. It is an introduced species and extensively naturalized in the Caribbean and Florida, as well as the Philippines and Guam via the Manila galleons. It has also been introduced to Cambodia, Thailand and South Asia, It is considered an invasive species in Hawaii.

== Description ==
Pithecellobium dulce is a tree that reaches a height of about 10 to 15 m (33 to 49 ft). Its trunk is spiny and up to nine meters in girth (9.4 feet thick DBH) and its leaves are bipinnate. Each pinna has a single pair of ovate-oblong leaflets that are about 2 to 4 cm (0.79 to 1.57 in) long. The flowers are greenish-white, fragrant, sessile and reach about 12 cm (4.7 in) in length, though appear shorter due to coiling. The flowers produce a pod, which turns pink when ripe and opens to expose the seed arils; a pink or white, edible pulp. The pulp contains black shiny seeds that are circular and flat. Pollen is a polyad of many pollen grains stitched together.

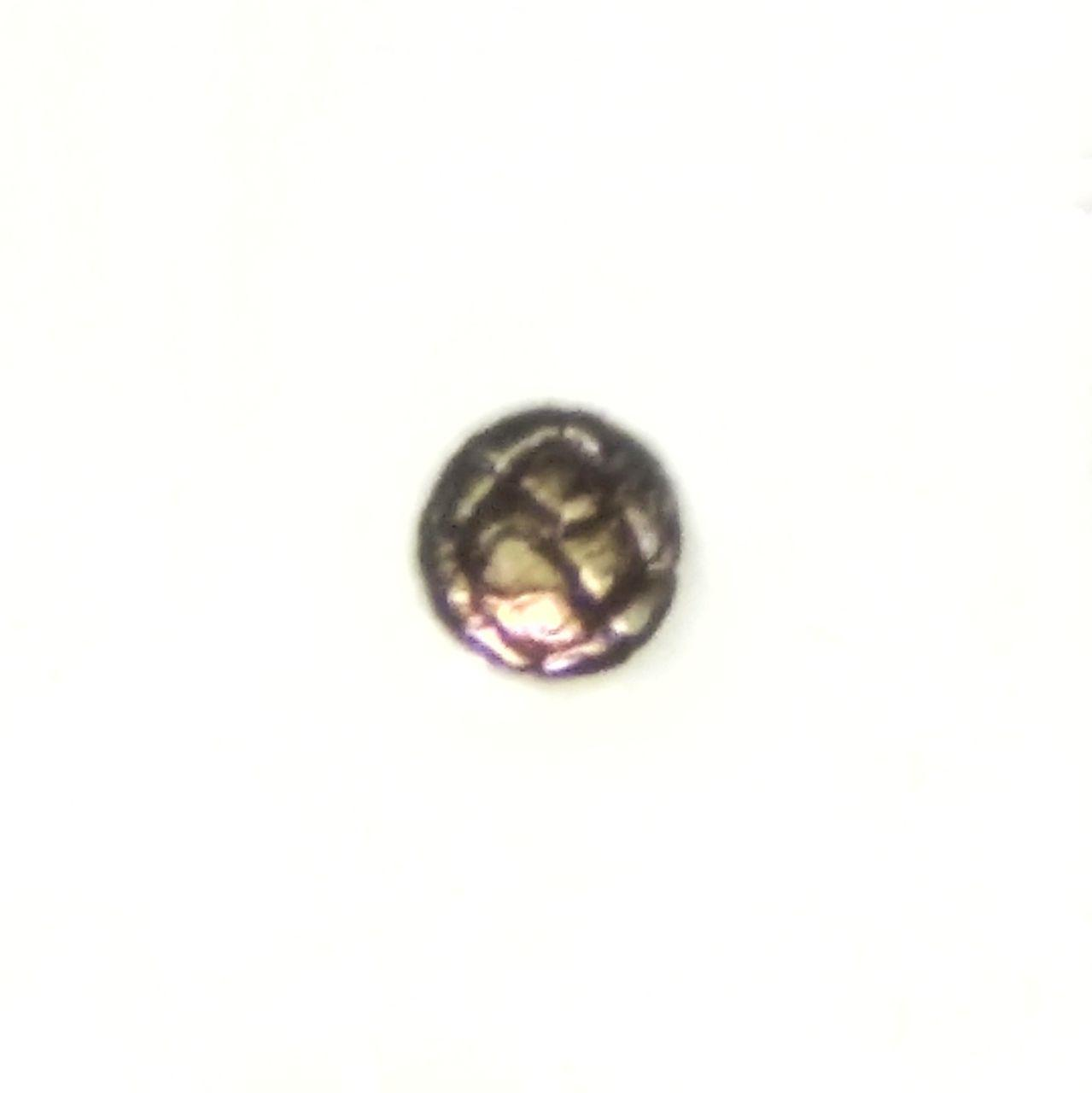
Pollen of Pithecellobium dulce

The seed is dispersed via birds that feed on the sweet pulp. The tree is drought resistant and can survive in dry lands from sea level to an elevation of 1,500 m (4,900 ft), making it suitable for cultivation as a street tree.

== Vernacular names ==
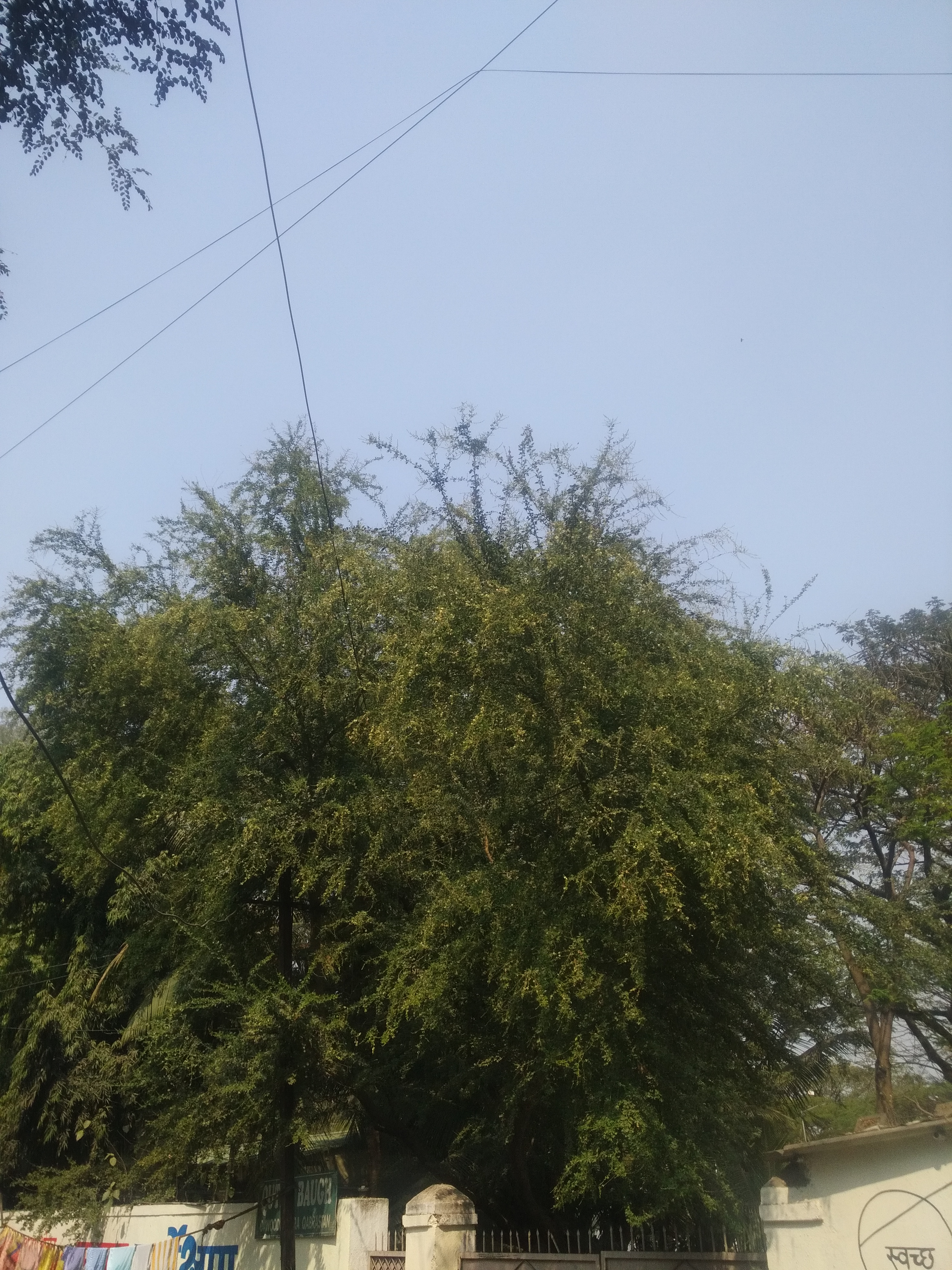
Pithecellobium dulce in Swargate, Pune, India

The English names "Manila tamarind" and "Madras thorn" are both misleading since it is neither related to the tamarind nor native to Manila (though it was introduced early to the Philippines) or Madras. Other English names include blackbead, sweet Inga, and monkeypod.

Depending on the region of its occurrence, Pithecellobium dulce is known by different names. In its native Mexico, the tree is known as huamuche, guamuche, huamúchil, guamúchil, or cuamúchil, deriving from its Nahuatl name cuauhmochitl. The Nahuatl derivations are also preserved in its names in the Philippines, where it was first introduced into Asia via the Manila galleons. It is known as kamachile in Tagalog (from where the English name "camachile" is derived), kamunsil in Hiligaynon, and damortis or kamantiris in Ilokano.

In the wider region of Latin America, it is also called pinzán, or guamá americano (Puerto Rico). In Colombia it is known as chiminango and payandé. It is also known as ʻopiuma in (Hawaiian).

In South Asia and the rest of Southeast Asia, it is known by many names, most of which literally translate to "foreign tamarind". These include: makham thet in Thai; plaeh umpel tek in Khmer; kona puliyangai in the Kongu region and kodukkappuli in other regions of Tamil Nadu; sīma cintakāya or sīma tummakāya in Telugu; dora hunase or sīme hunase in Kannada; bakhai ambli or goras amali ,katra in Gujarati; vilayati cinc or cinc bilai or cheese bilai in Marathi; jungle jalebi in Hindi; sīma kaiyan in Odia; achi gidamiri in Sindhi; and jilapi or khoiya babla in Bengali. In Pakistan, it is also known as "jungle jalebi", after the resemblance of its fruits to the jalebi.

== Uses ==
=== As food ===
The seed pods contain a sweet and sour pulp which is eaten raw in Mexico, the Philippines, Pakistan, Qatar and India as an accompaniment to various meat dishes and used as a base for drinks with sugar and water ('agua de guamúchil').

The seeds are said to be eaten (locally?) in the 'Revised handbook to the flora of Ceylon' (1980), edited by M.D. Dassanayake (this information is not in the original 'Flora of Ceylon' of 1894).

A number of studies since the 1980s have investigated the composition and possible uses of the seeds; it has been demonstrated that the seeds can be processed to extract a greenish oil, which when refined and analysed consists of potentially edible fatty acids (the precise composition varies depending on the study, but all agree oleic acid and palmitic acid are common, which is to be expected). Oils amount to 10-17% of the weight of the seeds. The seeds also contain 30-37.5-67.11% protein, which researchers suggest might in the future be used as animal feed.

=== As traditional medicine ===
The bark is used as an astringent for dysentery in India.

It is said to have been used as an antipyretic in India (information originally from 1933), used for eye inflammation, although an anecdote from Sri Lanka claims the bark contains a substance that causes eye infections and swelling of the eyelids.

The Huastec people of northern Veracruz and San Luis Potosí in Mexico used different parts of the tree to treat gum ailments, toothache and cancer.

The leaves are said to be used in a poultice with alcohol to treat bile, as well as being used to prevent abortions/miscarriage, although the leaves are also said to be used to cause abortions.

The pulp from the fruits is said to be astringent and hemostatic, and used for hemoptysis.

The ground seed is sometimes traditionally used to clean ulcers.

Non-specified parts of the plant are said to be used extract is also used against hemorrhages, chronic diarrhea, and tuberculosis.

== Ecology ==
Pithecellobium dulce is a host plant for the caterpillars of the Common nawab (Polyura athamas), three-spot grass yellow (Eurema blanda), Bright babul blue (Azanus ubaldus) and several moths.

== Synonyms ==
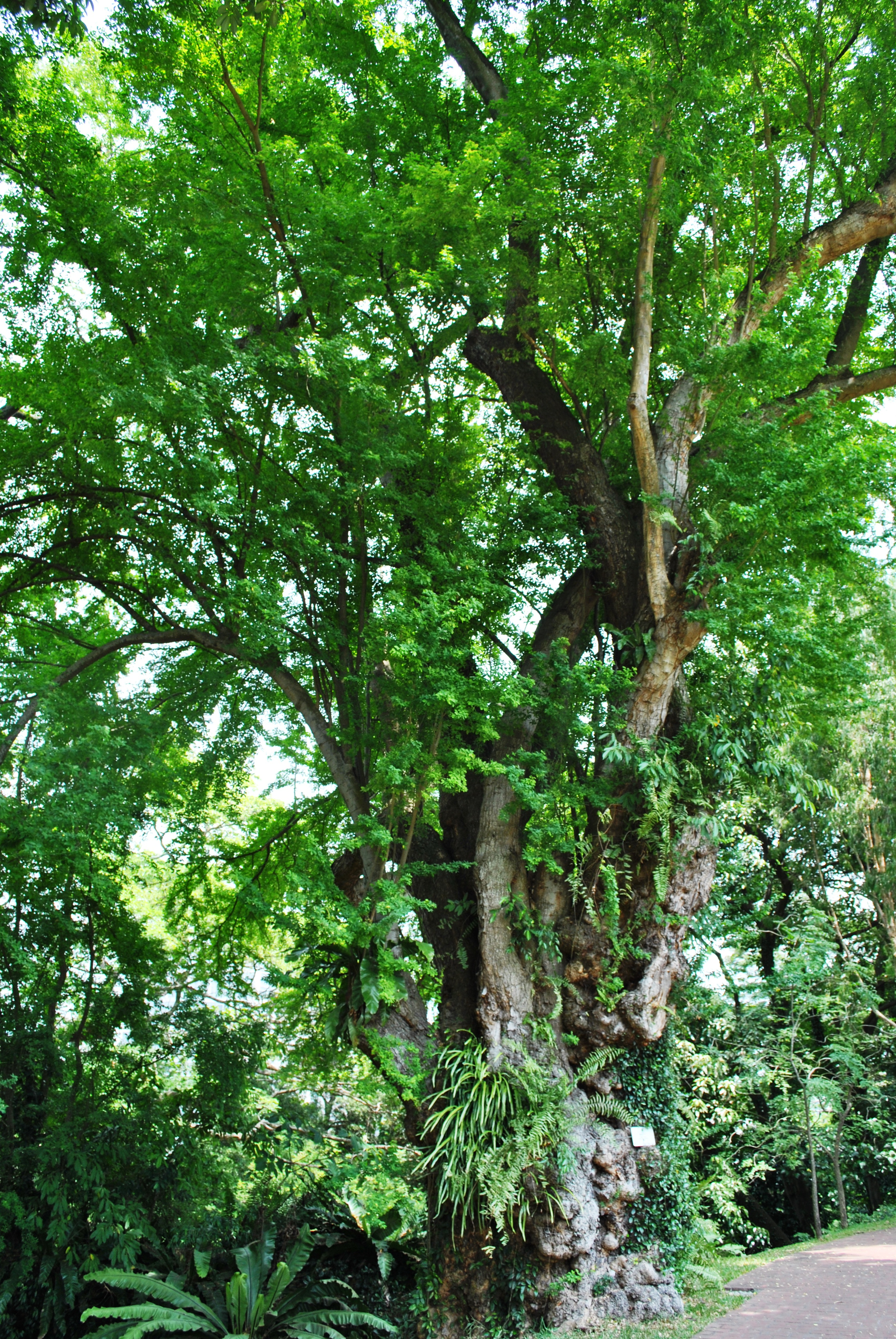
Pithecellobium dulce, Heritage Tree, Madras Thorn, Fort Canning, Singapore

Pithecellobium dulce is known under numerous junior synonyms:

- Acacia obliquifolia M.Martens & Galeotti
- Albizia dulcis (Roxb.) F.Muell.
- Feuilleea dulcis (Roxb.) Kuntze
- Inga camatchili Perr.
- Inga dulcis (Roxb.) Willd.
- Inga javana DC.
- Inga javanica DC.
- Inga lanceolata sensu Blanco
- Inga lanceolata Willd. is Pithecellobium lanceolatum
- Inga leucantha C.Presl
- Inga pungens Willd.
- Mimosa dulcis Roxb.
- Mimosa edulis Gagnep.
- Mimosa pungens (Willd.) Poir.
- Mimosa unguis-cati Blanco
- Mimosa unguis-cati L. is Pithecellobium unguis-cati
- Pithecellobium littorale Record
- Pithecollobium dulce (Roxb.) Benth. (lapsus)
