= Eucosmophora melanactis =

Scientific classification
- Kingdom: Animalia
- Phylum: Arthropoda
- Class: Insecta
- Order: Lepidoptera
- Family: Gracillariidae
- Genus: Eucosmophora
- Species: E. melanactis

Binomial name
- Eucosmophora melanactis (Meyrick, 1915)

Synonyms
- Acrocercops melanactis Meyrick, 1915

Species of moth

Eucosmophora melanactis is a moth of the family Gracillariidae. It is known from Guyana.

The length of the forewings is 3.5 mm for males.
