= Eucosmophora schinusivora =

Scientific classification
- Kingdom: Animalia
- Phylum: Arthropoda
- Class: Insecta
- Order: Lepidoptera
- Family: Gracillariidae
- Genus: Eucosmophora
- Species: E. schinusivora

Binomial name
- Eucosmophora schinusivora Davis & Wheeler, 2011

Species of moth

Eucosmophora schinusivora is a moth of the family Gracillariidae. It is found in Paraná, Brazil.

The larvae feed on Schinus terebinthifolus. They mine the leaves of their host plant.
