= Pithecellobium johansenii =

Conservation status
- Endangered (IUCN 2.3)

Scientific classification
- Kingdom: Plantae
- Clade: Tracheophytes
- Clade: Angiosperms
- Clade: Eudicots
- Clade: Rosids
- Order: Fabales
- Family: Fabaceae
- Subfamily: Caesalpinioideae
- Clade: Mimosoid clade
- Genus: Pithecellobium
- Species: P. johansenii

Binomial name
- Pithecellobium johansenii Standl.

Synonyms
- Pithecellobium telense Britton & Rose

Species of legume

Pithecellobium johansenii is a species of plant in the family Fabaceae. It is found in Belize, Guatemala, and Honduras.
