= Lyonia elliptica =

Conservation status
- Endangered (IUCN 3.1)

Scientific classification
- Kingdom: Plantae
- Clade: Tracheophytes
- Clade: Angiosperms
- Clade: Eudicots
- Clade: Asterids
- Order: Ericales
- Family: Ericaceae
- Genus: Lyonia
- Species: L. elliptica

Binomial name
- Lyonia elliptica (Small) Alain

Synonyms
- Xolisma elliptica Small

Species of flowering plant

Lyonia elliptica is a species of flowering plant in the family Ericaceae. It is a shrub or tree endemic to eastern Cuba. It is native to mountains of Guantanamo Province, where it grows in tropical submontane moist forest and xeromorphic scrubland on serpentine soils from 400 to 800 metres elevation. It is threatened by habitat loss.

The species was described as Xolisma elliptica by John Kunkel Small in 1914. In 1956 Henri Alain Liogier placed the species in genus Lyonia as L. elliptica.
