= Zygia juruana =

Scientific classification
- Kingdom: Plantae
- Clade: Tracheophytes
- Clade: Angiosperms
- Clade: Eudicots
- Clade: Rosids
- Order: Fabales
- Family: Fabaceae
- Subfamily: Caesalpinioideae
- Clade: Mimosoid clade
- Genus: Zygia
- Species: Z. juruana

Binomial name
- Zygia juruana (Harms) L.Rico

Synonyms
- Pithecellobium juruanum Harms

Species of plant

Zygia juruana is a species of flowering plant in the family Fabaceae, native to southeastern Colombia, Ecuador, Peru, northern Brazil, and Guyana. A tree, it is an important species in the low restinga habitat.
