= Zygia steyermarkii =

Conservation status
- Endangered (IUCN 3.1)

Scientific classification
- Kingdom: Plantae
- Clade: Tracheophytes
- Clade: Angiosperms
- Clade: Eudicots
- Clade: Rosids
- Order: Fabales
- Family: Fabaceae
- Subfamily: Caesalpinioideae
- Clade: Mimosoid clade
- Genus: Zygia
- Species: Z. steyermarkii

Binomial name
- Zygia steyermarkii (Schery) Barneby & J.W.Grimes

Species of legume

Zygia steyermarkii is a species of flowering plant in the family Fabaceae. It can only be found in Ecuador.
