= Eucosmophora eclampsis =

Scientific classification
- Domain: Eukaryota
- Kingdom: Animalia
- Phylum: Arthropoda
- Class: Insecta
- Order: Lepidoptera
- Family: Gracillariidae
- Genus: Eucosmophora
- Species: E. eclampsis

Binomial name
- Eucosmophora eclampsis (Durrant, 1914)

Synonyms
- Acrocercops eclampsis Durrant, 1914

Species of moth

Eucosmophora eclampsis is a moth of the family Gracillariidae. It is known from Panama.

The length of the forewings is 3.5 mm for females.
