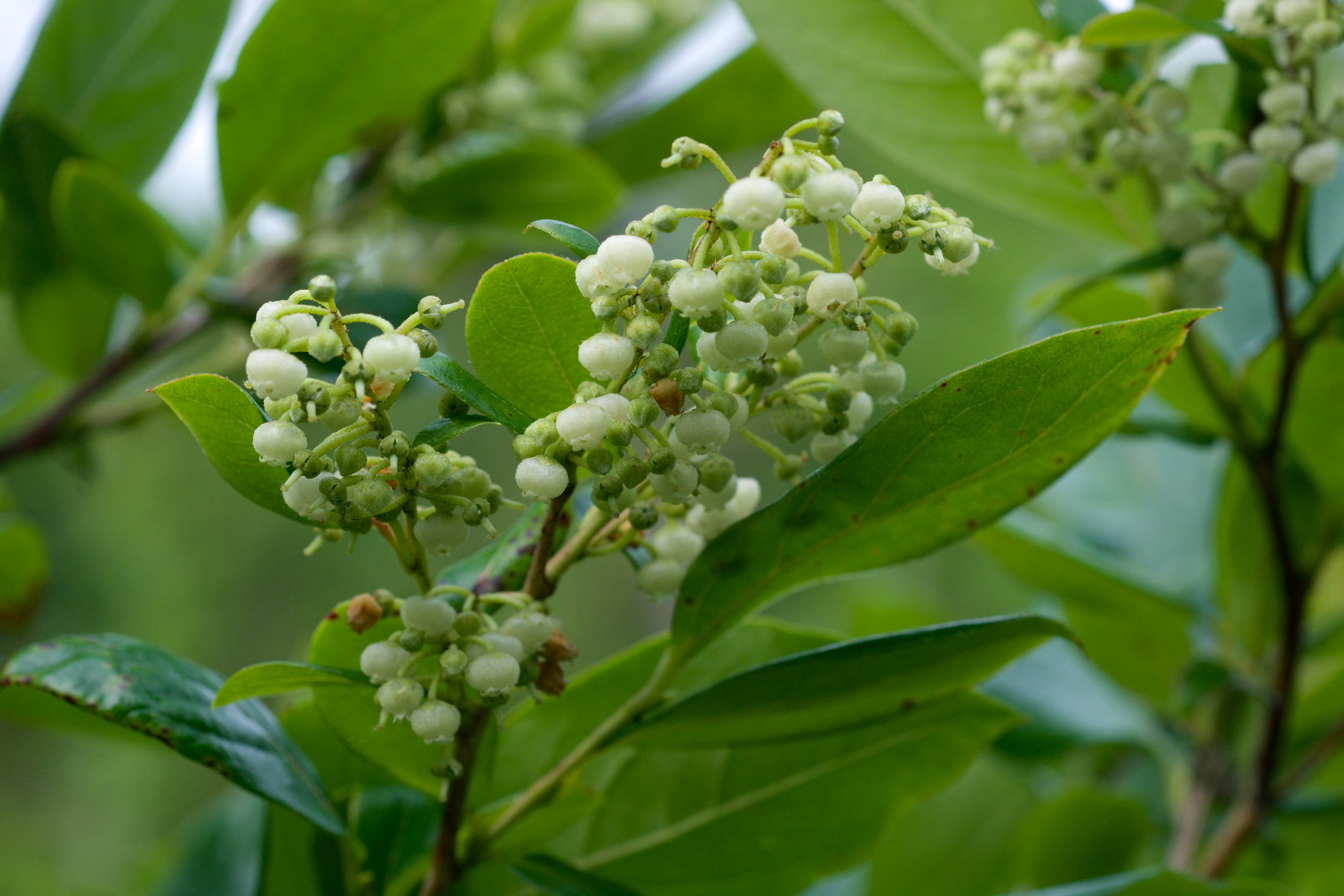

Conservation status
- Secure (NatureServe)

Scientific classification
- Kingdom: Plantae
- Clade: Embryophytes
- Clade: Tracheophytes
- Clade: Spermatophytes
- Clade: Angiosperms
- Clade: Eudicots
- Clade: Asterids
- Order: Ericales
- Family: Ericaceae
- Genus: Lyonia
- Species: L. ligustrina

Binomial name
- Lyonia ligustrina (L.) DC.

= Lyonia ligustrina =

Species of tree

Lyonia ligustrina is a species of flowering plant in the family Ericaceae known by the common names maleberry and he-huckleberry. It is native to the eastern United States from Maine to Florida and west to Texas and Oklahoma.

This shrub grows up to 4 m (13 ft) tall. It has long rhizomes which may send up new stems up to 4 m (13 ft) apart. The stems have longitudinally furrowed bark. The leaves may be deciduous or not, depending on variety. They are oval in shape and up to 10.5 cm (4.1 in) long by 5 cm (2.0 in) wide. The small flowers are white. The fruit is a small, dry capsule.

This is a common plant in several types of habitat, including savanna, bog, forest, pocosin, and swamp. It often occurs in ecotones. It can grow in wet and dry habitat types. It is tolerant of fire, budding and sending up shoots from its rhizome if aboveground parts are burned away. It grows in fire-prone habitat types, such as pine barrens.

The plant gets its common names from the fact that it produces hard, dry capsules instead of fleshy, juicy, edible fruits like other Ericaceae species such as huckleberries and blueberries.
