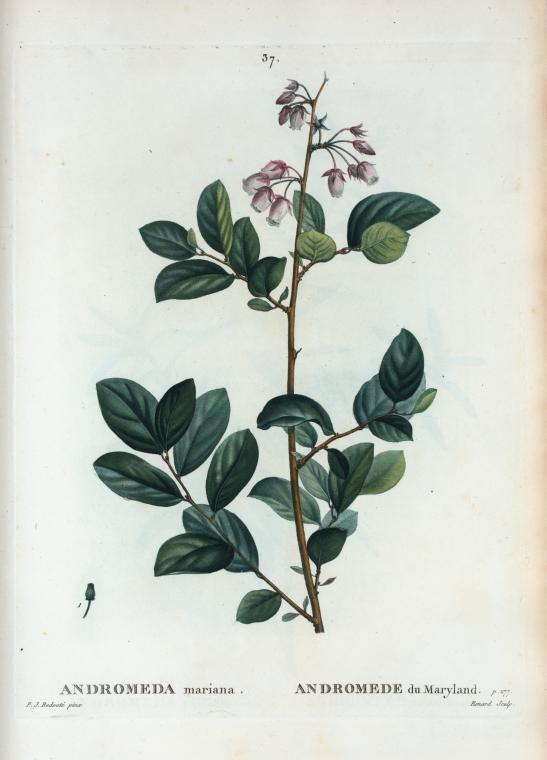

Scientific classification
- Kingdom: Plantae
- Clade: Tracheophytes
- Clade: Angiosperms
- Clade: Eudicots
- Clade: Asterids
- Order: Ericales
- Family: Ericaceae
- Genus: Lyonia
- Species: L. mariana

Binomial name
- Lyonia mariana (L.) D. Don

= Lyonia mariana =

Species of shrub

Lyonia mariana, the Piedmont staggerbush and staggerbush, is a perennial shrub that is native to the United States.

== Conservation status ==
It is listed as endangered in Pennsylvania, historical in Rhode Island, and as a species of special concern and believed extirpated in Connecticut.

== Ethnobotany ==
The Cherokee use an infusion of the plant for toe itch, 'ground-itch' and ulcers.

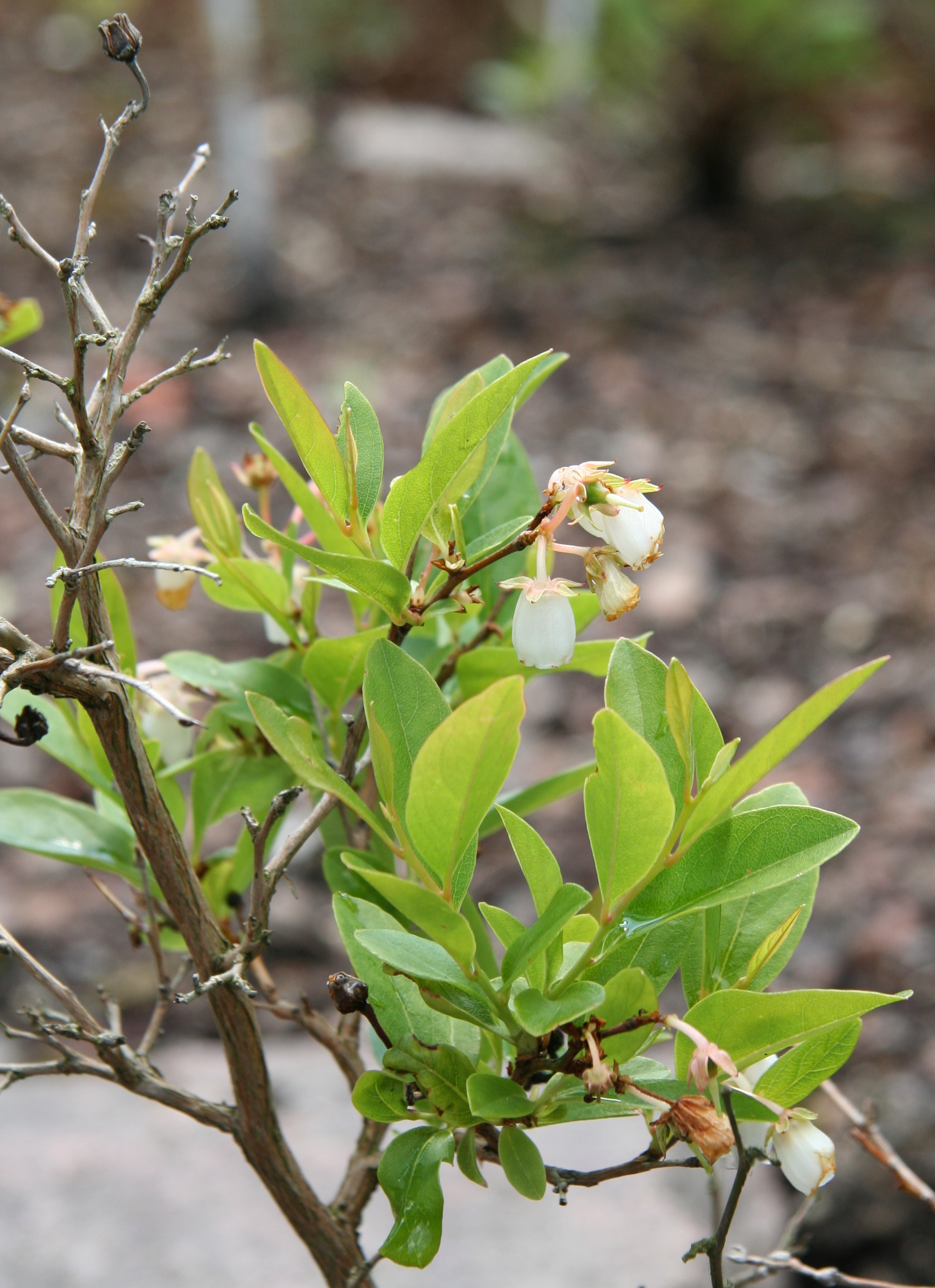

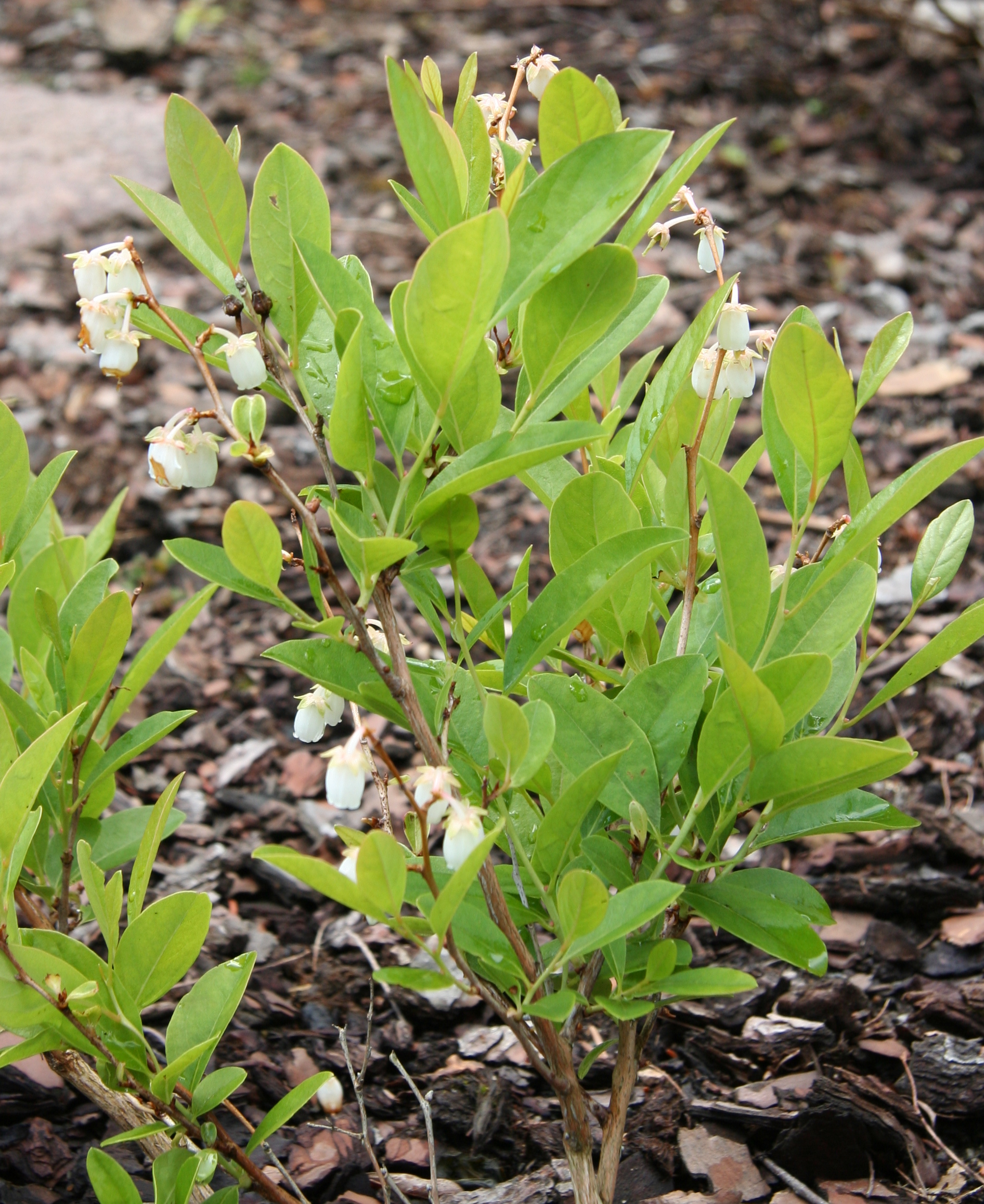

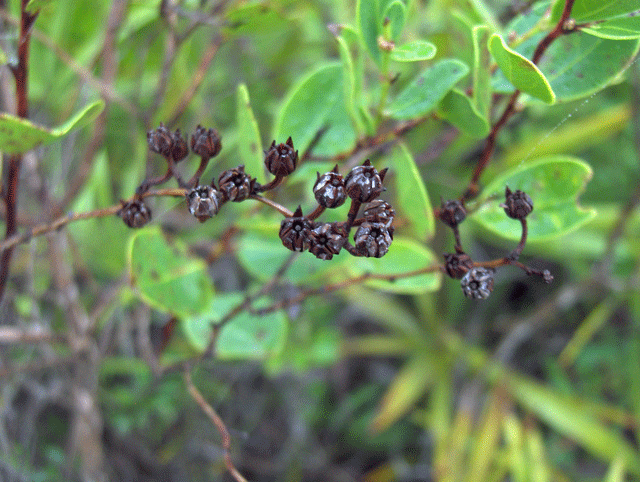
