= Lyonia octandra =

Conservation status
- Near Threatened (IUCN 2.3)

Scientific classification
- Kingdom: Plantae
- Clade: Tracheophytes
- Clade: Angiosperms
- Clade: Eudicots
- Clade: Asterids
- Order: Ericales
- Family: Ericaceae
- Genus: Lyonia
- Species: L. octandra

Binomial name
- Lyonia octandra (Sw.) Griseb.

Species of flowering plant

Lyonia octandra is a species of plant in the family Ericaceae. It is endemic to Jamaica.
