= Eucosmophora chrysocosma =

Scientific classification
- Kingdom: Animalia
- Phylum: Arthropoda
- Clade: Pancrustacea
- Class: Insecta
- Order: Lepidoptera
- Family: Gracillariidae
- Genus: Eucosmophora
- Species: E. chrysocosma

Binomial name
- Eucosmophora chrysocosma (Meyrick, 1915)

Synonyms
- Acrocercops chrysocosma Meyrick, 1915

Species of moth

Eucosmophora chrysocosma is a moth of the family Gracillariidae. It is known from Guyana.

The length of the forewings is 3.4–4 mm for males and 3.7–5 mm for females.

The larvae probably feed on a Sapotaceae species and probably mine the leaves of their host plant.
