= Zygia oriunda =

Conservation status
- Vulnerable (IUCN 2.3)

Scientific classification
- Kingdom: Plantae
- Clade: Tracheophytes
- Clade: Angiosperms
- Clade: Eudicots
- Clade: Rosids
- Order: Fabales
- Family: Fabaceae
- Subfamily: Caesalpinioideae
- Clade: Mimosoid clade
- Genus: Zygia
- Species: Z. oriunda

Binomial name
- Zygia oriunda (J. F. Macbr.) L. Rico

Species of plant

Zygia oriunda is a species of flowering plant in the family Fabaceae. It is found only in Peru.
