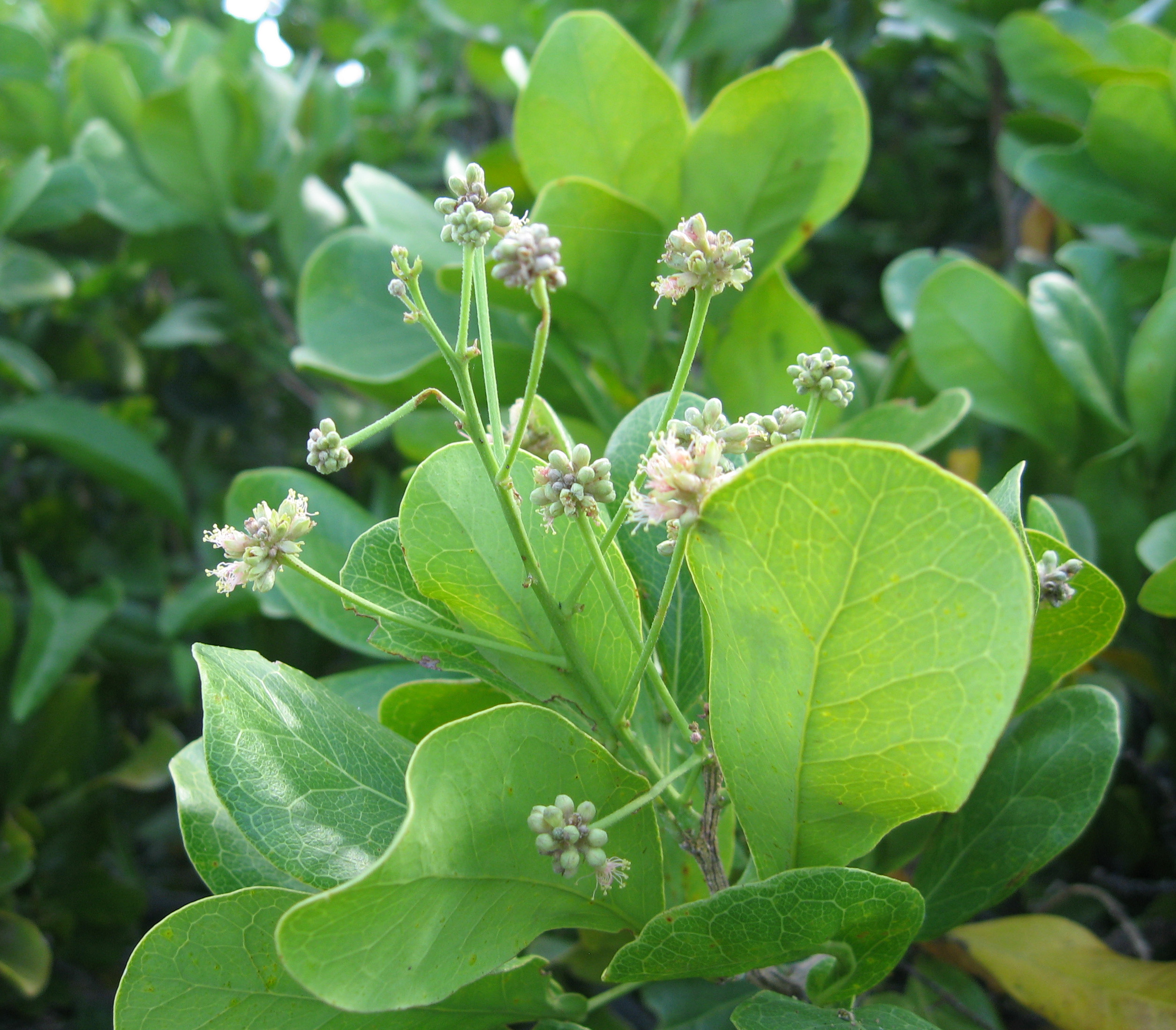
- Showing emerging flowers

Conservation status
- Apparently Secure (NatureServe)

Scientific classification
- Kingdom: Plantae
- Clade: Tracheophytes
- Clade: Angiosperms
- Clade: Eudicots
- Clade: Rosids
- Order: Fabales
- Family: Fabaceae
- Subfamily: Caesalpinioideae
- Clade: Mimosoid clade
- Genus: Pithecellobium
- Species: P. keyense

Binomial name
- Pithecellobium keyense Britton ex Britton & Rose

= Pithecellobium keyense =

Species of legume

Pithecellobium keyense, commonly called Florida Keys blackbead or Florida Key apes-earring, is a species of flowering plant in the legume family (Fabaceae).

== Distribution and habitat ==
It is native to The Bahamas, Belize, Cuba, Mexico (in the states of Quintana Roo and Yucatán), and the U.S. state of Florida. It typically grows over sand and limestone substrates, often near coastal areas. It is a common species throughout much of its range.

== Description ==
Pithecellobium keyense is a shrub or small tree. It has pinnately compound leaves, with 2–4 leaflets. The leaves are evergreen and leathery in texture. Flowers are produced in heads, and range in color from white to pink. Its fruits are a long coiled bean.

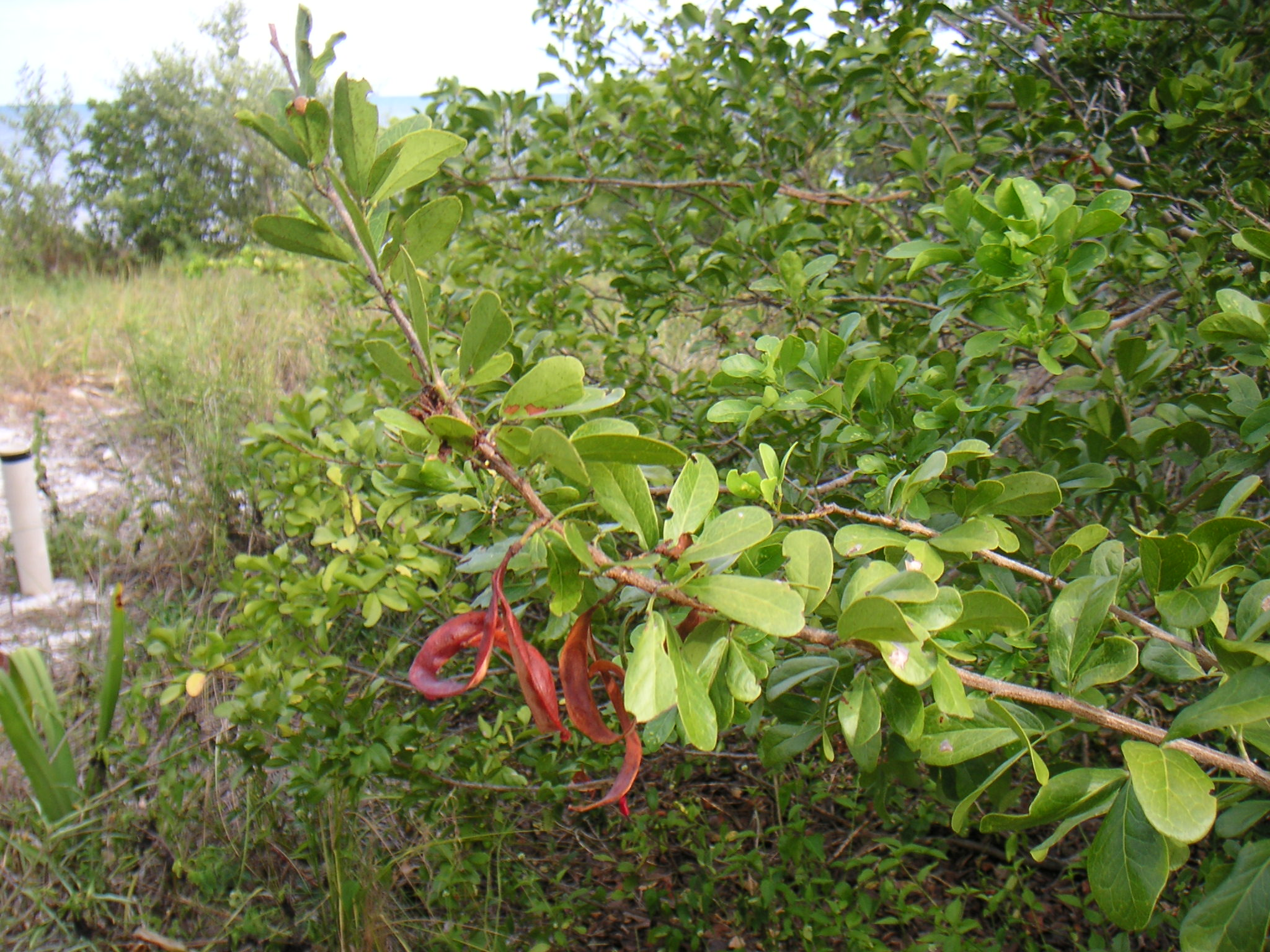
A fruiting specimen
