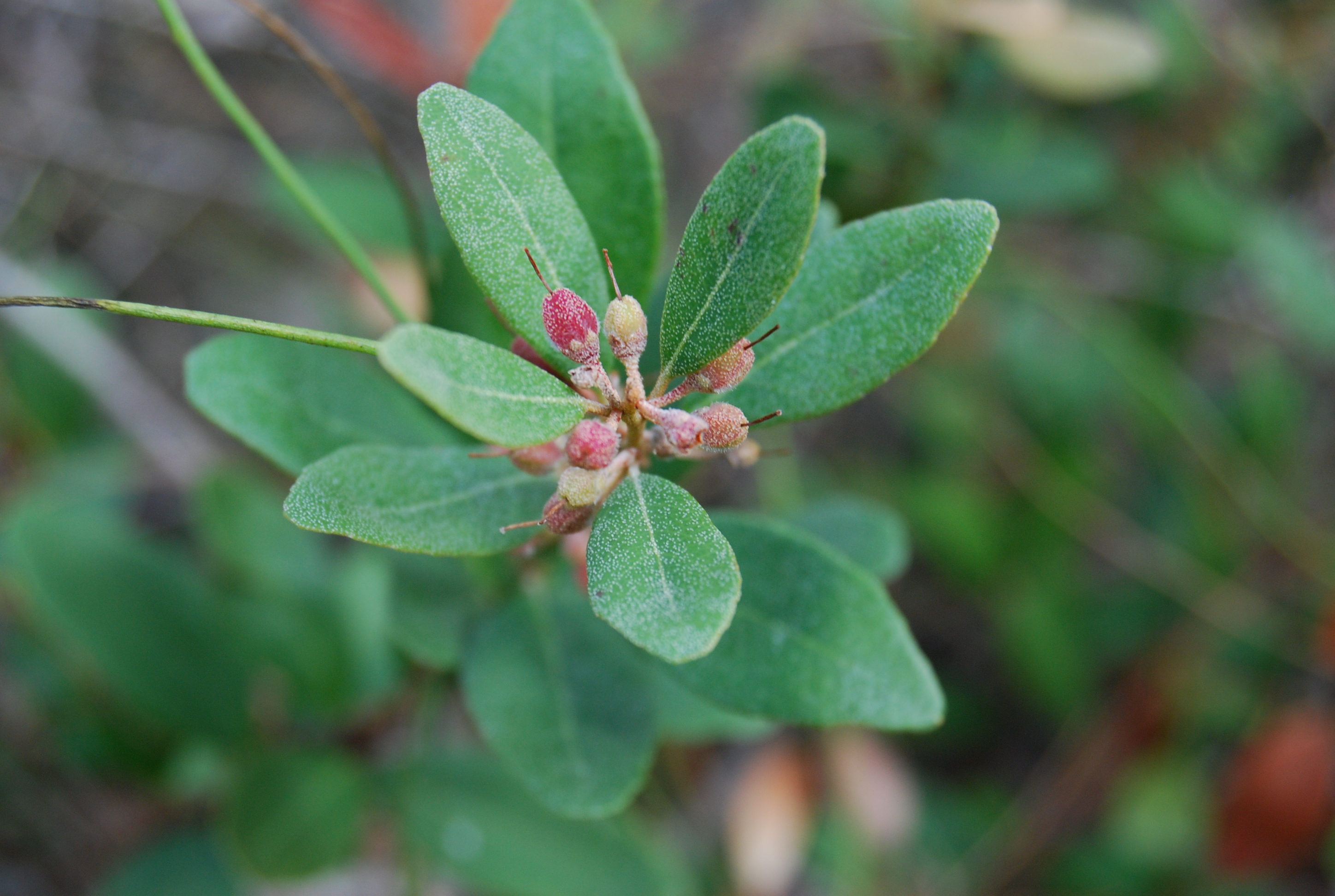
- var. proctorii

Scientific classification
- Kingdom: Plantae
- Clade: Tracheophytes
- Clade: Angiosperms
- Clade: Eudicots
- Clade: Asterids
- Order: Ericales
- Family: Ericaceae
- Genus: Lyonia
- Species: L. truncata

Binomial name
- Lyonia truncata Urb.

Varieties
- Lyonia truncata var. montecristina (Urb. & Ekman) Judd; Lyonia truncata var. proctorii Judd; Lyonia truncata var. truncata

= Lyonia truncata =

Species of flowering plant

Lyonia truncata is a species of flowering plant in the family Ericaceae known as Dominican staggerbush. It is a shrub or tree native to Hispaniola (the Dominican Republic and Haiti) and Puerto Rico.

Three varieties are accepted:

- Lyonia truncata var. montecristina (Urb. & Ekman) Judd – Hispaniola
- Lyonia truncata var. proctorii Judd – Puerto Rico
- Lyonia truncata var. truncata – Hispaniola

Lyonia truncata var. proctorii, or Proctor's staggerbush, is a rare plant endemic to Puerto Rico. It is federally listed as an endangered species by the United States government.
