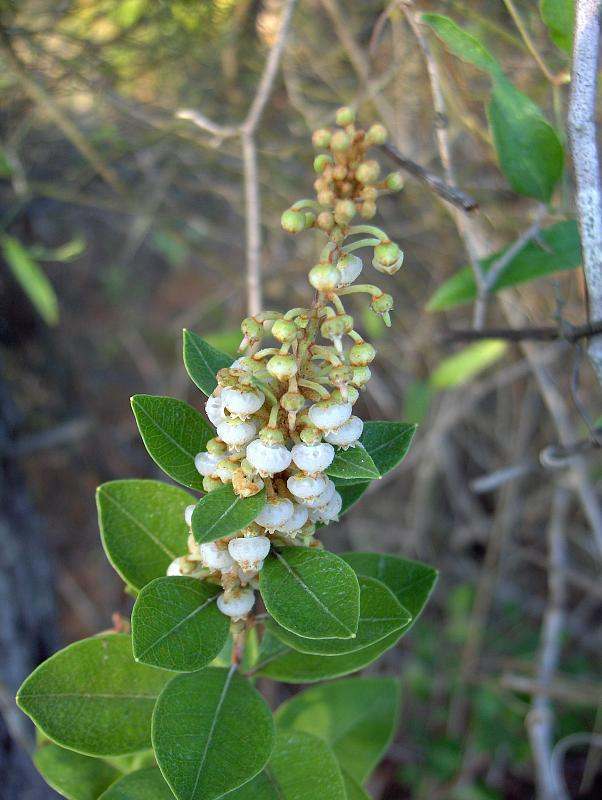

Conservation status
- Apparently Secure (NatureServe)

Scientific classification
- Kingdom: Plantae
- Clade: Tracheophytes
- Clade: Angiosperms
- Clade: Eudicots
- Clade: Asterids
- Order: Ericales
- Family: Ericaceae
- Genus: Lyonia
- Species: L. fruticosa

Binomial name
- Lyonia fruticosa (Michx.) G.S.Torr.

Synonyms
- Andromeda ferruginea var. fruticosa Michx.; Xolisma fruticosa (Michx.) Nash

= Lyonia fruticosa =

Poor-grub

Species of flowering plant

Lyonia fruticosa, the poor-grub or coastal plain staggerbush, is a plant species native to the US states of Florida, southern Georgia and the extreme southern part of South Carolina. It grows in pine woodlands and shrub bogs at elevations less than 100 meters (333 feet).

Lyonia fruticosa is an evergreen shrub up to 3 m (10 feet) tall. Leaves are broadly elliptical, up to 6 cm (2.4 inches) long. Its flowers are white, urn-shaped, hanging downward. The fruit is a dry, egg-shaped capsule about 4 mm (0.16 in) in diameter.
