= Zygia cognata =

Conservation status
- Least Concern (IUCN 3.1)

Scientific classification
- Kingdom: Plantae
- Clade: Tracheophytes
- Clade: Angiosperms
- Clade: Eudicots
- Clade: Rosids
- Order: Fabales
- Family: Fabaceae
- Subfamily: Caesalpinioideae
- Clade: Mimosoid clade
- Genus: Zygia
- Species: Z. cognata

Binomial name
- Zygia cognata (Schltdl.) Britton & Rose

Synonyms
- Numerous, see text

Species of legume

Zygia cognata is a tree species in the legume family (Fabaceae). It is found in Belize, Guatemala, and Honduras.

Junior synonyms are:

- Feuilleea cognata (Schltdl.) Kuntze
- Inga cognata Schltdl.
- Inga stevensonii Standl.
- Pithecellobium cognatum (Schltdl.) Benth.
- Pithecellobium stevensonii (Standl.) Standl. & Steyerm.
- Pithecolobium cognatum (Schltdl.) Benth. (lapsus)
- Pithecolobium stevensonii (Standl.) Standl. & Steyerm. (lapsus)
- Zygia stevensonii (Standl.) Record
