= Zygia pithecolobioides =

Conservation status
- Vulnerable (IUCN 2.3)

Scientific classification
- Kingdom: Plantae
- Clade: Tracheophytes
- Clade: Angiosperms
- Clade: Eudicots
- Clade: Rosids
- Order: Fabales
- Family: Fabaceae
- Subfamily: Caesalpinioideae
- Clade: Mimosoid clade
- Genus: Zygia
- Species: Z. pithecolobioides

Binomial name
- Zygia pithecolobioides (Kuntze) Barneby & J.W.Grimes

Synonyms
- Several, see text

Species of legume

Pithecellobium pithecolobioides, known as the granadillo de río, is a tree species in the legume family (Fabaceae).

Found in Argentina and Paraguay, it is threatened by habitat destruction; whether it still exists in Brazil is at least doubtful.

Junior synonyms are:

- Feuilleea pithecolobioides (Kuntze) Kuntze
- Inga pithecolobioides Kuntze
- Pithecellobium pithecolobioides (Kuntze) Hassl.
- Pithecellobium pithecolobioides (Kuntze) Hassl. var. harmsii Hassl.
- Pithecellobium pithecolobioides (Kuntze) Hassl. var. pithecolobioides (Kuntze)Hassl.
- Pithecellobium pithecolobioides (Kuntze) Hassl. var. reductum (Malme) Hassl.
- Pithecellobium reductum Malme
- Zygia reducta (Malme) L.Rico
