= Pithecellobium unguis-cati =

Conservation status
- Endangered (IUCN 2.3)

Scientific classification
- Kingdom: Plantae
- Clade: Tracheophytes
- Clade: Angiosperms
- Clade: Eudicots
- Clade: Rosids
- Order: Fabales
- Family: Fabaceae
- Subfamily: Caesalpinioideae
- Clade: Mimosoid clade
- Genus: Pithecellobium
- Species: P. unguis-cati

Binomial name
- Pithecellobium unguis-cati (L.) Benth.

Synonyms
- Feuilleea unguis-cati (L.) Kuntze; Feuilleea unguis-cati var. latifolia Kuntze; Inga felina Stokes; Inga guadalupensis (Pers.) Desv.; Inga microphylla Humb. & Bonpl. ex Willd.; Inga unguis-cati (L.) Willd.; Mimosa guadalupensis Pers.; Mimosa microphylla Poir., nom. illeg.; Mimosa unguis-cati L.; Pithecellobium flavovirens Britton; Pithecellobium guadalupense (Pers.) Chapm.; Pithecellobium guaricense Pittier; Pithecellobium microchlamys Pittier; Pithecellobium microphyllum (Humb. & Bonpl. ex Willd.) Benth.; Pithecellobium paniculatum Pittier; Pithecellobium pulchellum Pittier; Pithecellobium saxosum Standl. & Steyerm.; Pithecellobium seleri Harms; Spiroloba unguis Raf.; Zygia guadalupensis (Pers.) A.Heller; Zygia unguis-cati (L.) Sudw.

Species of legume

Pithecellobium unguis-cati is a species of plant in the family Fabaceae. It ranges from Mexico through Central America and the Caribbean to Colombia, Venezuela, and Florida. It is known by many synonyms.

The IUCN Red List lists a synonym, Pithecellobium saxosum, as endangered, with a distribution in Guatemala and Honduras.
