= Tropical hardwood hammock =

Ecological region of Florida, US

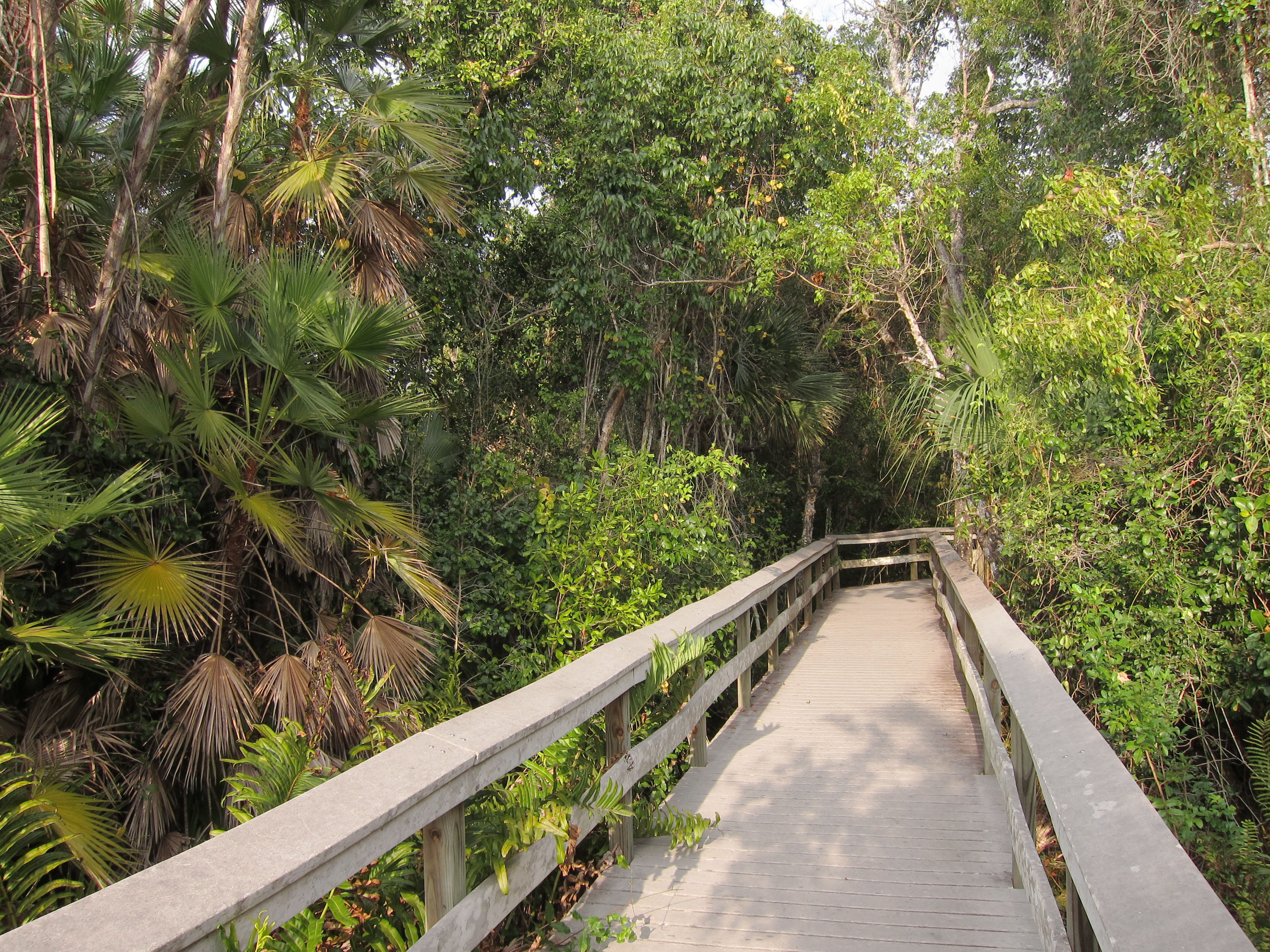
Mahogany Hammock Trail, an accessible tropical hardwood hammock in Everglades National Park

Tropical hardwood hammocks are closed canopy forests, dominated by a diverse assemblage of evergreen and semi-deciduous tree and shrub species, mostly of West Indian origin. Tropical hardwood hammocks are found in South Florida or the Everglades, with large concentrations on the Miami Rock Ridge, in the Florida Keys, along the northern shores of Florida Bay, and in the Pinecrest region of the Big Cypress Swamp.

Tropical hardwood hammocks are habitat for a few endemic plants and are critical habitat for many West Indian plant species whose ranges extend into South Florida. Tropical hardwood hammocks provide important habitat for many species of wildlife, including nine federally listed species. Tropical hardwood hammocks have been heavily affected by outright destruction, conversion to agriculture, exotic plant and animal species, collecting pressure on plants and animals, anthropogenic fires, and alterations in hydrology. There are efforts to restore disturbed tropical hardwood hammocks and to control exotic plant species. While most remaining hammocks outside of the Florida Keys are protected, hammocks are still threatened by development in the Keys.

== Distribution ==
Large areas of tropical hardwood hammocks are found in Everglades National Park and Biscayne National Park, throughout the Florida Keys, and in Big Cypress National Preserve. Tropical hardwood hammocks also persist in small preserves along the Atlantic coastal strip from Miami-Dade County north to Martin County. Analogous communities are found in the Bahamas and the Greater Antilles. Most maritime hammocks on barrier islands in South Florida are similar to this community.

== Description ==
Tropical hardwood hammock is a closed canopy forest, dominated by a diverse assemblage of evergreen and semi-deciduous tree and shrub species, mostly of West Indian origin. It is important habitat for ferns and orchids of West Indian origin. Tropical hardwood hammock is not a fire maintained community, although fire may burn into tropical hardwood hammocks under certain conditions. Soils in tropical hardwood hammocks are primarily composed of organic material which has accumulated directly on top of mineral substrate, and are moist but rarely inundated.

Five major types of hammocks are:

1. Rockland hammock "islands" on limestone substrate in or on the edges of pine rockland or marl prairie communities on the Miami Rock Ridge and in Big Cypress National Preserve.
2. Keys rockland hammock on limestone substrate, making up the dominant forest type in the Florida Keys.
3. Coastal berm hammock on storm-deposited berms in the Sand Keys (west of Key West), the Florida Keys, and along the northern shores of Florida Bay.
4. Tree island hammock in the Everglades marsh and surrounding marl prairie.
5. Shell mound hammock on aboriginal sites.

Tropical hardwood hammocks also include the more open coastal rock barren and sinkhole communities as classified by the Florida Natural Areas Inventory. Coastal rock barren is a rare community occurring in tiny patches in the Florida Keys. Sinkholes are found in areas of karst limestone, primarily in hammocks on the Miami Rock Ridge.

Tropical hardwood hammocks are habitat for a few endemic vascular plants. While few plant species are endemic to tropical hardwood hammocks, hammocks are critical habitat for West Indian species where the northernmost portions of their ranges extend into South Florida. The canopy height of tropical hardwood hammocks varies according to substrate and climate. On the Miami Rock Ridge, a mature hammock will have a closed canopy at 18 m (59 ft) or less, while those on the Florida Keys have a canopy 9 to 12 m (30 to 39 ft) tall. The tropical hardwood hammock shrub and herb layer is sparse, mostly consisting of seedlings and saplings of canopy and subcanopy trees and shrubs.

One of the most important ecotonal communities associated with tropical hardwood hammocks is the hammock edge where it interfaces with pine rockland, buttonwood wetlands, marl prairie, or other communities. The edges of hammocks are floristically very important, and many tropical hardwood hammock species are limited to these ecotones (although they may be found in other communities such as pine rocklands, or in hammock gaps following disturbance). Hammock gaps, similar to but substantially different from hammock edges, are also important to hammock dynamics. Historically, hammock gaps were created by storm events, including hurricanes, which allowed pioneer species to invade openings in the hammock canopy.

Coastal rock barrens are composed of two distinct subcommunities. Upland coastal rock barrens are openings on flat rocklands with sparse, mostly low-growing xeric plants and exposed limestone. Wetland coastal rock barrens are influenced by spring high tides and are dominated by common wetland plants and coastal shrubs.

=== Soils, hydrology, and climate ===
Tropical hardwood hammock occurs on limestone, sand, and shell substrates which are moist and usually do not flood. Hammocks on limestone substrates, however, are dependent on the underlying water table to keep humidity levels high, especially in limestone sinkholes. Mesic conditions are developed by a combination of the hammock's rounded profile and nearly impenetrable edges, which deflect wind and limit the effects of desiccation. The dense canopy minimizes temperature fluctuations by reducing soil warming during the day and heat loss during the night.

Rockland hammocks are found on elevated outcrops of limestone, often in association with limestone sinkholes. Coastal berm hammocks are found on ridges of storm-deposited marine debris, usually within mangrove or salt marsh communities. In the Keys, these hammocks also occur fronting open water areas. Shell mound hammocks are found on elevated mounds of mollusk shells and aboriginal garbage on which a hardwood, closed canopy forest has developed. Coastal rock barrens are found on flat rocky surfaces either immediately adjacent to the coast or within the interior of islands in the Florida Keys. Sinkholes are cylindrical or conical depressions with steep limestone walls, found in karst rockland areas. Soils, when they exist, consist of calcareous marls and organic debris on the surface, within solution depressions, and in crevices in limestone.

Elevations on the Miami Rock Ridge vary from greater than 7 m (23 ft) above sea level in the vicinity of Biscayne Bay to less than 2 m (6.6 ft) above sea level in the Long Pine Key area of Everglades National Park, with an average elevation of approximately 3 m (9.8 ft), and varying in width from 6 to 16 km (3.7 to 9.9 mi). Elevations of the limestone formations in the Keys are significantly lower, from 1 to 2 m (6.6 ft) above sea level. However, high elevations of 4 to 5 m (13 to 16 ft) above sea level are found in Key West and Lignumvitae Key.

Rainfall in southeastern Florida averages from over 163 cm (64 in) annually in the northwest portion of Miami-Dade County to between 122 and 142 cm (48 and 56 in) annually in the rest of the county. Mean rainfall in the upper Florida Keys is 127 cm (50 in), and in the lower Keys is about 102 cm (40 in). The majority of this precipitation (75 percent) occurs between June and October. Rainfall generally percolates quickly through the soil, maintaining fresh water or low salinity "lenses" below many hammocks.

== Flora and fauna ==
=== Flora ===
Tropical hardwood hammocks are dominated by species of tropical origin, many of which are limited in their U.S. distribution to hammocks in the Florida Keys. While some West Indian species are relatively common in South Florida (e.g., gumbo limbo and strangler fig), many of these species are extremely rare and are listed as threatened or endangered by the State of Florida. Miami Rock Ridge hammocks are also important habitat for a number of listed epiphytic orchids, bromeliads, ferns, and peperomias found in the Big Cypress and other regions.

Trees

- Buccaneer palm (Pseudophoenix sargentii)
- Canella (Canella winterana)
- Crabwood (Gymnanthes lucida)
- Cuban Nakedwood (Colubrina cubensis)
- Cupania (Cupania glabra)
- Darlingplum (Reynosia septentrionalis)
- Florida thatch palm (Thrinax radiata)
- Gulf licaria (Licaria triandra)
- Gumbo-limbo (Bursera simaruba)
- Hackberry (Celtis laevigata)
- Holywood lignum-vitae (Guaiacum sanctum)
- Jamaican dogwood (Piscidia piscipula)
- Krug's holly (Ilex krugiana)
- Live oak (Quercus virginiana)
- Manchineel (Hippomane mancinella)
- Milkbark (Drypetes diversifolia)
- Paradise tree (Simarouba glauca)
- Pigeon plum (Coccoloba diversifolia)
- Princewood (Exostema caribaea)
- Pond apple (Annona glabra)
- Red mulberry (Morus rubra)
- Red stopper (Eugenia rhombea)
- Short-leaf fig (Ficus citrifolia)
- Soapberry (Sapindus saponaria)
- Soldierwood (Colubrina elliptica)
- Strangler fig (Ficus aurea)
- Torchwood (Amyris elemifera)
- West Indian mahogany (Swietenia mahagoni)
- Wild lime (Zanthoxylum fagara)
- Wild mastic (Sideroxylon foetidissimum)
- Wild tamarind (Lysiloma latisiliquum)
- Willow bustic (Sideroxylon salicifolium)
- Yellowheart (Zanthoxylum flavum)

Shrubs

- Bahama strongback (Bourreria succulenta)
- Bay cedar (Suriana maritima)
- Beeftree (Guapira discolor)
- Bitterbush (Picramnia pentandra)
- Blackbead (Pithecellobium keyense)
- Black ironwood (Krugiodendron ferreum)
- Buttonwood (Conocarpus erectus)
- Cape Sable thoroughwort (Chromolaena frustrata)
- Cinnecord (Acacia choriophylla)
- Cocoplum (Chrysobalanus icaco)
- Coontie (Zamia integrifolia)
- Coralbean (Erythrina herbacea)
- Costa Rican ladies-tresses (Spiranthes costaricensis)
- Cuban colubrina (Colubrina cubensis)
- Firebush (Hamelia patens)
- Florida boxwood (Schaefferia frutescens)
- Florida trema (Trema micrantha)
- Hammock lantana (Lantana canescens)
- Inkwood (Hypelate trifoliata)
- Jamaica caper (Capparis cynophallophora)
- Keys hopbush (Dodonaea elaeagnoides)
- Lancewood (Ocotea coriacea)
- Limber caper (Capparis flexuosa)
- Maidenbush (Heterosavia bahamensis)
- Marlberry (Ardisia escallonoides)
- Mayten (Maytenus phyllanthoides)
- Mexican alvaradoa (Alvaradoa amorphoides)
- Myrsine (Myrsine cubana)
- Myrtle-of-the-river (Calyptranthes zuzygium)
- Poisonwood (Metopium toxiferum)
- Potatowood (Solanum erianthum)
- Rough strongback (Bourreria radula)
- Rough velvetseed (Guettarda scabra)
- Satinleaf (Chrysophyllum oliviforme)
- Saffron plum (Sideroxylon celastrinum)
- Seashore ageratum (Ageratum littorale)
- Shrub eupatorium (Koanophyllon villosum)
- Spanish stopper (Eugenia foetida)
- Spicewood (Calyptranthes pallens)
- West Indies cherry (Prunus myrtifolia)
- West Indies lilac (Tetrazygia bicolor)
- White indigoberry (Randia aculeata)
- Wild coffee (Psychotria nervosa)
- White stopper (Eugenia axillaris)
- Wild dilly (Manilkara jaimiqui)

Plants and flowers

- American beautyberry (Callicarpa americana)
- Ames' halbard fern (Tectaria × amesiana)
- Baby rubber plant (Peperomia obtusifolia)
- Bahama tree cactus (Pilosocereus bahamensis)
- Ballmoss (Tillandsia recurvata)
- Bamboo grass (Lasciasis divaricata)
- Barbwire cactus (Acanthocereus tetragonus)
- Biscayne spleenwort (Asplenium × biscayneanum)
- Blodgett's wild-mercury (Argythamnia bodgettii)
- Blue porterweed (Stachytarpheta jamaicensis)
- Boston fern (Nephrolepis exaltata)
- Brittle maidenhair fern (Adiantum tenerum)
- Broad halberd fern (Tectaria heracleifolia)
- Cape Sable thoroughwort (Chromolaena frustrata)
- Common nightshade (Solanum americanum)
- Costa Rican ladies tresses (Spiranthes costaricensis)
- Creeping fern (Thelypteris reptans)
- Cupania (Cupania glabra)
- False leadplant (Dalea carthagenense var. floridana)
- Florida dancinglady orchid (Oncidium floridanum)
- Florida filmy fern (Trichomanes punctatum ssp. floridanum)
- Florida govenia (Govenia floridana) - extinct
- Holly fern (Lomariopsis kunzeana)
- Least halberd fern (Tectaria fimbriata)
- Florida oncidium (Oncidium floridanum)
- Giant airplant (Tillandsia fasciculata)
- Greenbrier (Smilax auriculata)
- Havana clustervine (Jacquemontia havanensis)
- Helmet orchid (Galeandra beyrichii)
- Holly fern (Lomariopsis kunzeana)
- Keys indigo (Indigofera mucronata var. keyensis)
- Key's jumping cactus (Opuntia triacanthos)
- Key's nutrush (Scleria lithosperma)
- Key's tree cactus (Pilosocereus robinii)
- Kraus' filmy fern (Trichomanes krausii)
- Limestone flatsedge (Cyperus fuligineus)
- Leatherleaf airplant (Tillandsia variabilis)
- Least halberd fern (Tectaria fimbriata)
- Maidenhair fern (Adiantum melanoleucum)
- Mahogany mistletoe (Phoradendron rubrum)
- Marsh's Dutchman's pipe (Aristolochia pentandra)
- Morning glory (Jacquemontia pentanthos)
- Muscadine grape (Vitis rotundifolia)
- Northern needleleaf (Tillandsia balbisiana)
- Pearlberry (Vallesia glabra)
- Pine fern (Anemia adiantifolia)
- Prickly-pear (Opuntia stricta)
- Resurrection fern (Polypodium polypodioides)
- Rouge plant (Rivina humilis)
- Seashore ageratum (Ageratum littorale)
- Sea lavender (Tournefortia gnaphalodes)
- Shiny-leaf wild coffee (Psychotria nervosa)
- Sixangle foldwing (Dicliptera sexangularis)
- Slender spleenwort (Asplenium dentatum)
- Small-flowered orchid (Prescottia oligantha)
- Semaphore cactus (Opuntia corallicola)
- Spanish moss (Tillandsia usneoides)
- Spleenwort (Asplenium verecundum)
- Spreading airplant (Tillandsia utriculata)
- Strap-leaved guzmania (Guzmania monostachya)
- Swartz' snoutbean (Rhynchosia swartzii)
- Sword fern (Nephrolepis biserrata)
- Twisted airplant (Tillandsia flexuosa)
- West Indian cock's comb (Celosia nitida)
- West Indian false-box (Gyminda latifolia)
- West Indian snowberry (Chiococca alba)
- White-flowered passionvine (Passiflora multiflora)
- Woods fern (Thelypteris kunthii)
- Woods grass (Oplismenus hirtellus)
- Yellow hibiscus (Cienfuegosia yucatanensis)
- Yellow nicker (Caesalpinia major)

=== Fauna ===
There are numerous Federally listed animals that depend upon or utilize tropical hardwood hammocks. Hardwood hammocks in the Big Cypress region provide important habitat for the Florida panther. The eastern indigo snake is found in tropical hardwood hammocks throughout South Florida, as well as other communities such as sandhill and scrub. The Key deer is restricted to pine rocklands and tropical hardwood hammocks on Big Pine Key. Both the Key Largo cotton mouse and the Key Largo woodrat are endemic to tropical hardwood hammocks on Key Largo in the upper Florida Keys. The Stock Island tree snail is historically known only from hammocks on Stock Island and Key West.

The endangered Florida bonneted bat is considered to be the largest bat in Florida. Although the bat numbers are unknown, the species was once believed to be common on Florida's east coast but has been reported there only once since 1967. Other than a single colony of eight individuals, no sightings have been reported on Florida's west coast. Although the Florida bonneted bat's favorite diurnal roosts may be under the shingles of Spanish tiles, they have also been found in the shafts of royal palm leaves and in cavities created by red-cockaded woodpeckers and enlarged by a pileated woodpecker. Most of these animals were found in heavily forested areas. Tree cavities in South Florida are rare and, therefore, competition is fierce.

Birds

- Black-whiskered vireo (Vireo altiloquus)
- Blue jay (Cyanocitta cristata)
- Northern cardinal (Cardinalis cardinalis)
- Carolina wren (Thryothorus ludovicianus)
- Gray kingbird (Tyrannus dominicensis)
- Great crested flycatcher (Myiarchus crinitus)
- Key West quail-dove (Geotrygon chrysia)
- Kirtland's warbler (Setophaga kirtlandii)
- Mangrove cuckoo (Coccyzus minor)
- Pine warbler (Setophaga pinus)
- Red-bellied woodpecker (Melanerpes carolinus)
- Smooth-billed ani (Crotophaga ani)
- White-crowned pigeon (Columba leucocephala)
- White-eyed vireo (Vireo griseus)
- Zenaida dove (Zenaida aurita)

Mammals

- Florida black bear (Ursus americanus floridanus)
- Florida bonneted bat (Eumops floridanus)
- Florida panther (Puma concolor couguar)
- Key deer (Odocoileus virginianus clavium)
- Key Largo cotton mouse (Peromyscus gossypinus allapaticola)
- Key Largo woodrat (Neotoma floridana smalli)

Reptiles and amphibians

- Brown anole (Anolis sagrei)
- Eastern indigo snake (Drymarchon couperi)
- Eastern narrow-mouthed toad (Gastrophryne carolinensis)
- Florida brown snake (Storeria dekayi victa)
- Florida ribbon snake (Thamnophis saurita sackenii)
- Florida Keys mole skink (Eumeces egregius egregius)
- Greenhouse frog (Eleutherodactylus planirostris)
- Red rat snake (Elaphe guttata guttata)
- Rim rock crowned snake (Tantilla oolitica)
- Southeastern five-lined skink (Eumeces inexpectatus)
- Southern leopard frog (Lithobates sphenocephalus)
- Southern toad (Anaxyrus terrestris)

Invertebrates

- Banded tree snail (Orthalicus floridensis)
- Crablike spiny orb weaver (Gasteracantha cancriformis)
- Florida tree snail (Liguus fasciatus)
- Giant orb weaver (Trichonephila clavipes)
- Lined treesnail (Drymaeus multilineatus)
- Schaus swallowtail butterfly (Papilio aristodemus ponceanus)
- Stock Island tree snail (Orthalicus reses)
- Tropical orb weaver (Eriophora ravilla)

== Ecology ==
Tropical hardwood hammocks burn infrequently, although the precise role of fire in tropical hardwood hammocks is poorly understood. Recovery of tropical hardwood hammocks following fire is dependent on the nature of the fire, in particular whether the fire consumes a thick layer of the organic matter containing the tree roots. When the organic layer is not consumed, recovery of tropical hardwood trees is rapid, and canopy closure can be achieved in 40 years or less. Fire is a crucial element to the South Florida ecosystem. Without fire, hammock expansion into pine rocklands would occur only as a result of anthropogenic factors.

== Status and trends ==
=== Development ===
The majority of the remaining tropical hardwood hammocks outside of the Florida Keys have now been acquired and are no longer threatened by development. Large areas of tropical hardwood hammocks are protected in Everglades National Park, Big Cypress National Preserve, and Biscayne National Park.

In the Florida Keys, significant areas are protected in Dagny Johnson Key Largo Hammock Botanical State Park, National Key Deer Refuge, and other federal, state, local, and privately owned conservation areas. Nevertheless, a significant amount of tropical hardwood hammock remains in private ownership and is still threatened by development in the Keys. The upland coastal rock barren is the most threatened by development. The small number and size, five sites totaling 4.5 ha (11 acres) of these unique areas, makes them susceptible to development impacts and invasion by exotic plants. Shell mounds have been damaged and continue to be threatened by damage from artifact-seekers and archeological excavations.

Some significant hammock areas have been completely destroyed; most notable is the virtually complete destruction of Brickell Hammock just south of downtown Miami. This once pristine hammock has been reduced to three small fragments totaling less than 20 ha (49 acres). Miami Rock Ridge hammocks have also been fragmented and isolated from surrounding natural communities through urban and rural development. In the upper Florida Keys, virtually all of the tropical hardwood hammock is secondary growth, because of earlier conversions to agriculture. Hammocks in Key West have been completely obliterated with the exception of one tiny patch at Little Hamaca Park in the Key West salt ponds. Logging for West Indian mahogany and buttonwood has also occurred in hammocks along the northern shores of Florida Bay. In some cases, habitat loss has been the direct cause of plant extirpations.

Although tropical hardwood hammocks tend to be located in patches across the landscape, they compose part of a complex mosaic of communities including mangroves, coastal marshes and prairies, freshwater swamps, and pinelands. Fragmentation of tropical hardwood hammocks and their artificial separation from other communities has had serious effects on both the hammocks and the wildlife that utilize them. For instance, the physical separation of Key Largo woodrats caused by hammock fragmentation makes it more difficult for them to locate a mate. Fragmentation may also make it difficult for certain migratory bird species to survive in the developed landscape.

In addition to outright habitat loss and its associated fragmentation effects, the process of urbanization and rural development has caused significant negative effects on tropical hardwood hammocks. The development of roads has increased access to natural areas, including hammocks, to collectors of orchids, bromeliads, ferns, butterflies, and Liguus tree snails. Collecting pressure is also one of the principal threats to the Stock Island tree snail and the semaphore cactus. Roads also lead to wildlife mortality from automobile traffic, including that of the Florida panther.

Tropical hardwood hammock has been affected by both reductions and increases in the mean water table. On the Miami Rock Ridge, the average water table has dropped by several feet since the beginning of the century. In contrast, hammocks in the South Florida Water Management District Water Conservation Areas have been flooded within the last few decades, and many hardwood trees have been destroyed by high water.

A variety of contaminants have also affected tropical hardwood hammocks and their constituent fauna. Mosquito spraying has been implicated in a number of problems, including the direct mortality of the Schaus swallowtail butterfly and other butterflies. This in turn, reduces food availability for land birds. Mosquito spraying may also impact food availability of the Key Largo woodrat. Rodent control agents are also known to be problems, specifically for the Key Largo woodrat. Other pesticides are known to cause the mortality of Stock Island tree snails and other invertebrates.

=== Invasive species ===
Exotic plant species have also significantly affected tropical hardwood hammocks. Impacts of exotic plant species have been particularly severe in hammocks on the Miami Rock Ridge. In some cases, exotic plants now compose 50% of the flora of hammock fragments on the Ridge. Vines, such as Gold Coast jasmine (Jasminum dichotomum), air-potato (Dioscorea bulbifera), and nephthytis (Syngonium podophyllum), have decimated many hammocks on the Miami Rock Ridge. Exotic trees and shrubs such as Brazilian pepper (Schinus terebinthifolius) are problematic in hammocks throughout South Florida, including undisturbed areas in the Everglades. Coastal berm hammocks along the shores of Florida Bay have been heavily impacted by the sprawling vine-like shrub latherleaf (Colubrina asiatica). Recent GIS mapping of invasive exotics throughout the Florida Keys shows that approximately 2,833 ha (7,000 acres) of susceptible upland habitat have been invaded by exotic plants, especially Australian pine, Brazilian pepper and latherleaf. Areas of disturbed substrate within and adjoining Keys hardwood hammocks are often heavily infested with exotic plants that are rapidly spreading into and displacing the natural plant community.

Exotic animals have also impacted tropical hardwood hammocks. Introduced species that occur in South Florida rocklands include 7 mammals, about 30 birds, 4 amphibians, and 25 reptiles. Armadillo (Dasypus novemcinctus), black rat (Rattus rattus), fire ant (Solenopsis invicta), and hog (Sus scrofa) as well as the domestic cat (Felis domesticus), have all been found in South Florida hammocks. Black rats and fire ants both prey on the endangered Stock Island tree snail, and fire ants may increase the mortality of the Key Largo woodrat.

=== Natural events ===
Hurricanes and other disturbance phenomena, which are natural parts of the South Florida ecosystem, can also have negative effects once fragmentation and the spread of exotic plant species have occurred. This was recently exemplified by Hurricane Andrew. This hurricane had sustained winds in excess of 233 km/h (145 mph) with vortices up to 322 km/h (200 mph). Once species become rare (e.g.., the Schaus swallowtail butterfly), extreme climatic events, such as hurricanes, freezes, and droughts, can become serious threats. In September 1998, Hurricane Georges caused major alterations to tropical hardwood hammocks in the lower Keys including damage where roads and other forms of fragmentation opened the hammocks to wind turbulence resulting in downed or broken trees. Aside from wind damage, the storm surge associated with Hurricane Georges overwashed the Cactus Hammock on Big Pine Key resulting in the loss of the hammock's understory.

== Management ==
In both Miami-Dade County and the Florida Keys, cooperation with landowners of tropical hardwood hammocks is essential to the long-term protection of this natural community. In 1979, Dade County enacted the Environmentally Endangered Lands Covenant Program which reduces taxes for owners of tropical hardwood hammocks and pine rocklands who agree not to develop these systems and to manage them for a period of 10 years. This program is still ongoing and protects many tropical hardwood hammock sites. No similar system exists in Monroe County, where a significant amount of tropical hardwood hammock is still in private ownership, and much is subdivided into small parcels. The Forest Resources Program is also collaborating with the Boy Scouts of America to link private sites with Eagle Scout projects and is exploring several mechanisms to provide monetary support for management on private lands.

Ecologist's research is not conclusive as to allow a hammock to age through a matrix of old and new growth or whether to restore it with the assistance of human intervention.

The most aggressive campaign to restore tropical hardwood hammocks is being conducted by Miami-Dade County Parks and Recreation Department, Natural Areas Management Division. This program has been very active since Hurricane Andrew in 1992, and has completed a substantial amount of management work in hammocks in four parks on the Miami Rock Ridge: The Charles Deering Estate, R. Hardy Matheson Preserve, Castellow Hammock Park, and Matheson Hammock Park. Monitoring of this program at three hammocks has been conducted by the University of Miami, and ongoing technical assistance has been provided by the Institute for Regional Conservation. The Natural Areas Management Division has also provided technical assistance and training to the City of Miami for the restoration of tropical hardwood hammocks there. This included two of the three Brickell Hammock fragments that remain: parts of Alice Wainwright Park, and Simpson Park Hammock.

In the Florida Keys, significant work on exotic plant control has been initiated. Most exotics in this area are on the margins of hammocks and in disturbed areas. Fairchild Tropical Garden and The Nature Conservancy have also been active in reintroducing and augmenting populations of rare plants to tropical hardwood hammocks in the Florida Keys.

Tropical hardwood hammocks can also be restored where they have been destroyed. A testament to this is the fact that virtually all of the tropical hardwood hammocks in the Florida Keys are secondary and have recovered following clearing for agriculture and settlements. Hammocks on Elliott and Rhodes Keys had recovered well after 35 years of natural regeneration. Tropical hardwood hammocks can also become established in areas of pine rockland that has been cleared and then abandoned. Secondary forests can be useful for wildlife, even at a relatively young age. Key Largo woodrats and the Schaus swallowtail butterfly both utilize relatively young secondary forests in the Florida Keys.

Native plant enthusiasts have been promoting the use of native plants and the restoration of native plant communities in South Florida since the early 1970s, and tropical hardwood hammocks are one of the first natural communities which people attempted to create from scratch. Efforts to create tropical hardwood hammocks began as early as 1965.

One of the downsides of the trend in landscaping with native plants is that some species are being distributed outside of their historic range, where they can become established and potentially invasive. For example, the pitch-apple (Clusia rosea), which is perhaps native to the lower Florida Keys, has been widely distributed in cultivation throughout southeastern Florida. It now has begun to naturalize throughout southeastern Florida and poses a threat to several natural communities, including tropical hardwood hammocks. In South Florida, native species have very specific natural ranges, and these ranges must be respected within the restoration planning context.

Monitoring of tropical hardwood hammocks and their management is also critical.

== See also ==
- Hammock (ecology)
- Restoration of the Everglades
