= P. moritziana =

P. moritziana may refer to:

- Pitcairnia moritziana, a plant endemic to Venezuela
- Platystachys moritziana, an air plant
- Polysiphonia moritziana, a red algae
