= T. moritziana =

T. moritziana may refer to:

- Tayloria moritziana, a moss that has spore capsules with teeth that are arthrodontous
- Tillandsia moritziana, an air plant
