= Govenia floridana =

Conservation status
- Extinct (1964) (IUCN 3.1)

- Presumed Extinct (1964) (NatureServe)

Scientific classification
- Kingdom: Plantae
- Clade: Tracheophytes
- Clade: Angiosperms
- Clade: Monocots
- Order: Asparagales
- Family: Orchidaceae
- Subfamily: Epidendroideae
- Genus: Govenia
- Species: †G. floridana

Binomial name
- †Govenia floridana P.M.Br.

Species of orchid

Govenia floridana, the Florida govenia or tropical govenia, is an extinct species of orchid that was endemic to Everglades National Park in Florida. It was discovered for the first time in 1957, with a total population of 25 individuals, and the last verified report was from the same site in 1964, where the population had declined to just 10 individuals. It is likely that poaching of plants contributed to its decline and extinction.

== Description ==
Govenia floridana was a perennial herb that grew up to 50 cm (19.5 in) tall. It had only 2 leaves, each with a sheath 3–30 cm (1–12 in) long and an elliptical blade up to 35 cm (14 in) long. Flowers were white with purple spots. It grew in deeply shaded tropical hardwood hammock habitat on the island of Long Pine Key, a 77 km^{2} (30 sq mi) island in Everglades National Park.
