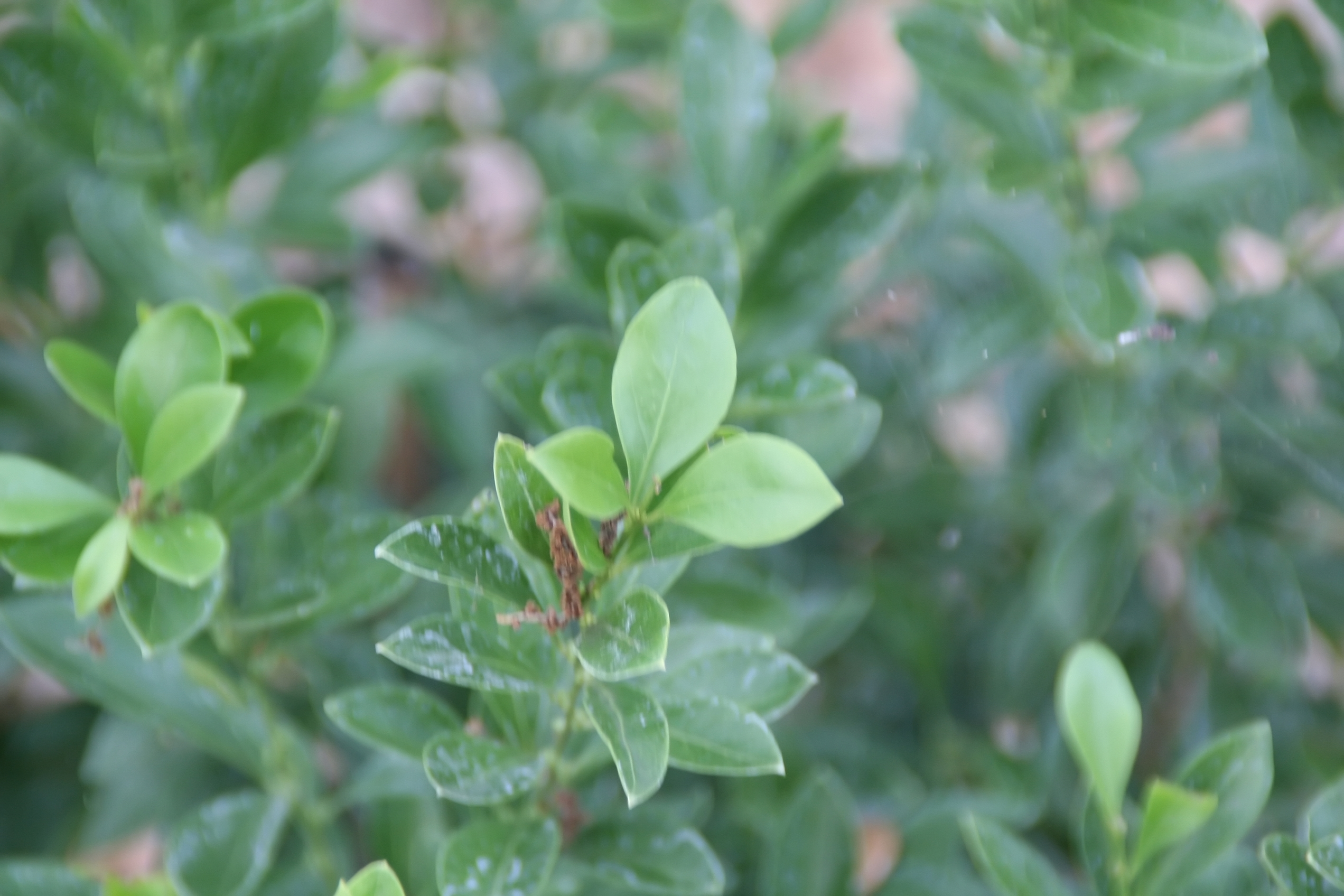
- Schaefferia frutescens at Fairchild Tropical Botanic Garden, Miami

Scientific classification
- Kingdom: Plantae
- Clade: Tracheophytes
- Clade: Angiosperms
- Clade: Eudicots
- Clade: Rosids
- Order: Celastrales
- Family: Celastraceae
- Genus: Schaefferia; Jacq.

Species
- 15; see text

= Schaefferia (plant) =

Family of shrubs and trees

Schaefferia is a genus of flowering shrubs and small trees in the family Celastraceae. The generic name honours German mycologist and clergyman Jacob Christian Schäffer (1718–1790). Members of the genus are found in the Neotropics. The plants are dioecious, with flowers that are unisexual due to abortion. The flowers are usually clustered in the leaf axil, although they are solitary in some species. The calyx of the flowers has four lobes, and the corolla consists of four petals. The ovary consists of two locules; each locule contains a single ovule which develops into a single seed. The fruit is a drupe.

== Species ==
Acevedo-Rodríguez reports 16 species in the genus. Plants of the World Online accepts 15 species.

- Schaefferia angustifolia Urb. & Ekman
- Schaefferia argentinensis Speg.
- Schaefferia cuneifolia A.Gray – Desert yaupon
- Schaefferia dietheri Herter
- Schaefferia ephedroides Urb.
- Schaefferia frutescens Jacq. – Florida boxwood
- Schaefferia lottiae Lundell
- Schaefferia marchii Griseb. ex Urb.
- Schaefferia oaxacana Standl.
- Schaefferia obovata Urb.
- Schaefferia ovatifolia Lundell
- Schaefferia pilosa Standl.
- Schaefferia serrata Loes.
- Schaefferia shrevei Lundell
- Schaefferia stenophylla Standl.

=== Formerly placed here ===
- Drypetes lateriflora (Sw.) Krug & Urb. (as S. lateriflora Sw.)
