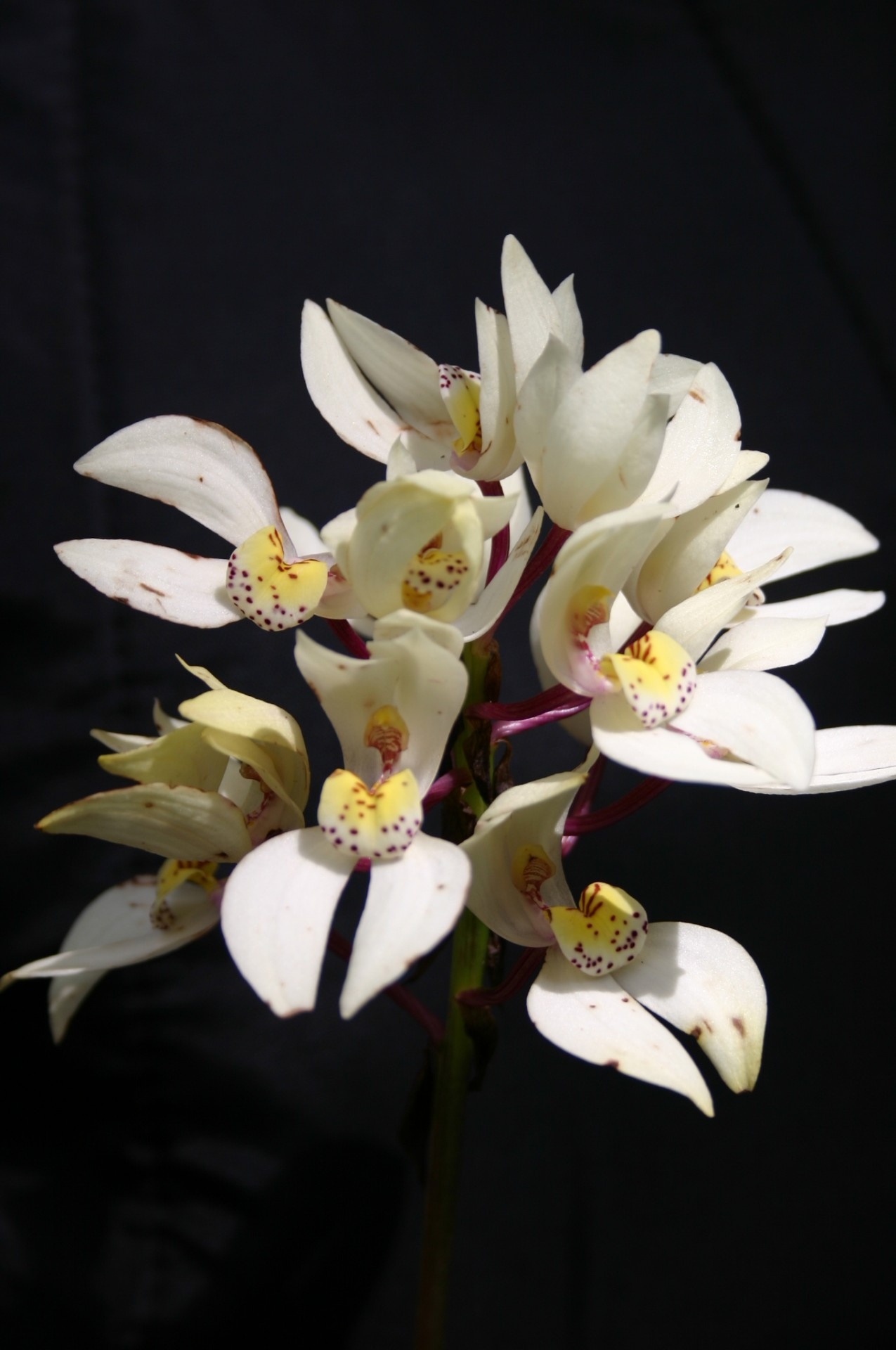
- Govenia capitata

Scientific classification
- Kingdom: Plantae
- Clade: Tracheophytes
- Clade: Angiosperms
- Clade: Monocots
- Order: Asparagales
- Family: Orchidaceae
- Subfamily: Epidendroideae
- Tribe: Epidendreae
- Subtribe: Calypsoinae
- Genus: Govenia; Lindl., 1832

Type species
- Govenia superba (La Llave & Lex.) Lindl. ex Lodd.

Synonyms
- Eucnemis Lindl.; Eucnemia Rchb.

= Govenia =

Genus of orchids

Govenia is a genus of flowering plants belonging to the orchid family Orchidaceae. The type species, Govenia superba, was transferred from Maxillaria superba and a genus name was given to commemorate J.R. Gowen, secretary of the Horticultural Society of London.

The species in this genus are terrestrial or sometimes epiphytic, and native to Mexico, Central and South America, the West Indies and Florida. This genus has cormous, egg-shaped pseudobulbs and thin, plicate leaves that are always paired. According to the Royal Horticultural Society, Gov. is the official abbreviation for this genus.

== Species ==
The following species are recognized as of June 2014:

1. Govenia alba A. Rich. & Galeotti 1845
2. Govenia bella E.W. Greenw. 1987 (Oaxaca, Mexico)
3. Govenia ciliilabia Ames & C. Schweinf. 1930 (Costa Rica; El Salvador; Panama)
4. Govenia dressleriana E.W. Greenw. 1993 (El Salvador; Guatemala; Mexico)
5. Govenia elliptica S. Watson 1891 (Mexico)
6. Govenia fasciata Lindl. 1843 (Venezuela)
7. †Govenia floridana P.M. Br. 2000 (Florida; extinct)
8. Govenia greenwoodii Dressler & Soto Arenas 2003 (Honduras)
9. Govenia jouyana R. González 1983
10. Govenia lagenophora Lindl. 1839 (El Salvador; Guatemala; Mexico)
11. Govenia latifolia (Kunth) Garay & G.A.Romero 1999
12. Govenia liliacea (Lex.) Lindl. 1835 (Mexico; Central America)
13. Govenia matudae E.W.Greenw. & Soto Arenas 2002
14. Govenia praecox Salazar & E.W. Greenw. 1993 (Veracruz, Mexico)
15. Govenia purpusii Schltr. 1918
16. Govenia quadriplicata Rchb. f. 1866
17. Govenia rubellilabia García-Cruz 2006
18. Govenia sodiroi Schltr. 1921 (Ecuador)
19. Govenia superba (La Llave & Lex.) Lindl. ex Lodd. 1831 : El Salvador; Guatemala; Mexico)
20. Govenia tequilana Dressler & Hágsater 1973 (Mexico)
21. Govenia tingens Poepp. & Endl. 1837-1838 (Ecuador; Peru)
22. Govenia utriculata (Sw.) Lindl. 1839 (Bolivia; Ecuador; Argentina)
23. Govenia viaria Dressler 2002
24. Govenia vilcabambana Dodson 1994 (Ecuador)
