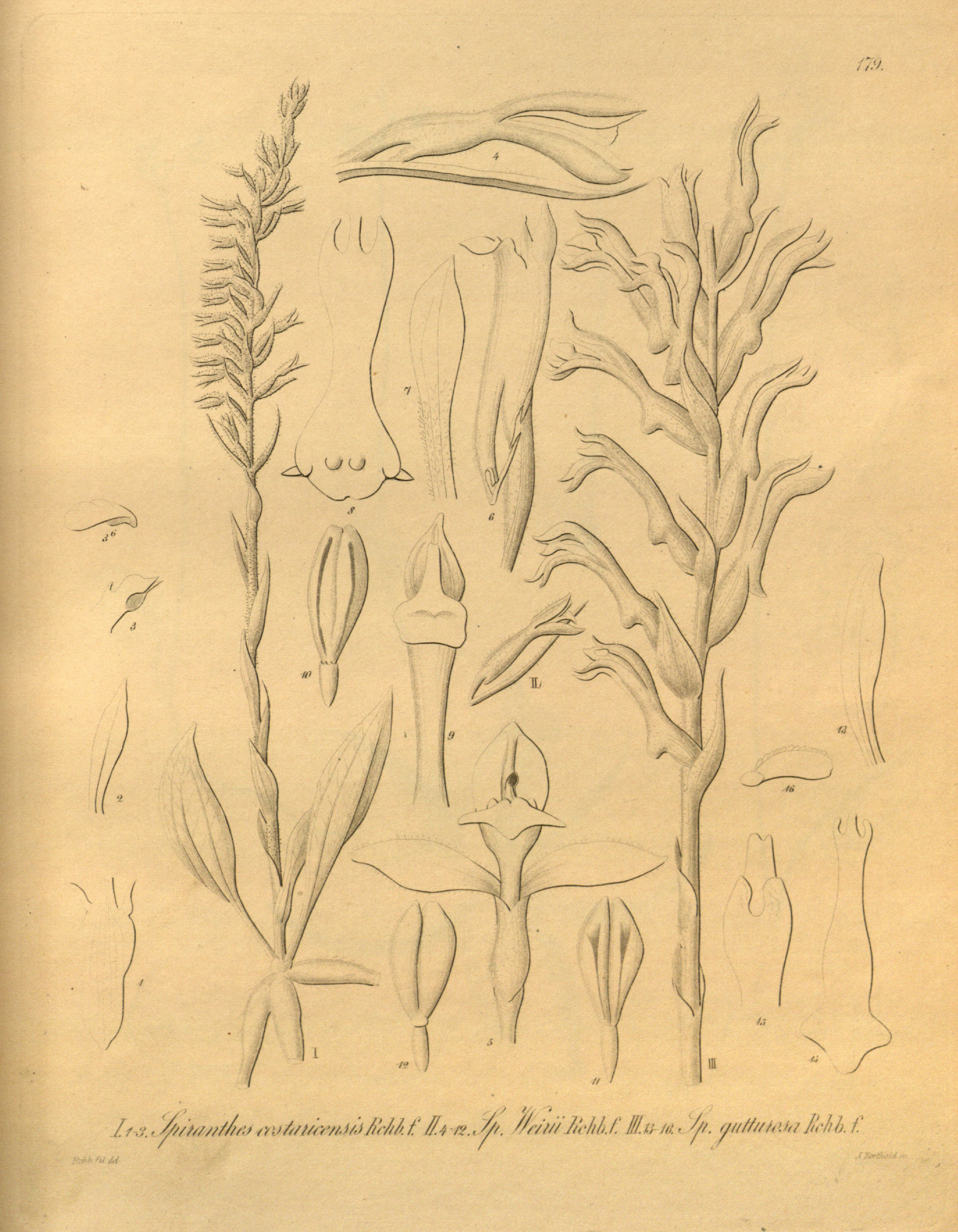
- Spiranthes costaricensis (synonym of Beloglottis costaricensis)

Scientific classification
- Kingdom: Plantae
- Clade: Tracheophytes
- Clade: Angiosperms
- Clade: Monocots
- Order: Asparagales
- Family: Orchidaceae
- Subfamily: Orchidoideae
- Tribe: Cranichideae
- Subtribe: Spiranthinae
- Genus: Beloglottis; Schlechter

Type species
- Beloglottis costaricensis (Rchb.f.) Schltr.

= Beloglottis =

Genus of flowering plants

Beloglottis is a genus of the family Orchidaceae. This genus belongs to the tribe Cranichideae and subtribe Spiranthinae. Orchids of the genus Beloglottis are terrestrial sympodial plants that can be used as herbal supplements. They have short, solitary stems that stand erect and the fleshy roots contain small hair-like projections and are arranged in a fascicle. Several leaves containing a petiole form at the base of the plant. The flowers appear as if they are upside down.

== Species ==
At present, 6 species are recognized, native to Mexico, Central America, the West Indies, South America and Florida:

- Beloglottis boliviensis Schltr. - Bolivia, Argentina
- Beloglottis costaricensis (Rchb.f.) Schltr. - widespread from Florida and San Luis Potosí through Central America, the Caribbean and South America as far south as Bolivia
- Beloglottis ecallosa (Ames & C.Schweinf.) Hamer & Garay in F.Hamer - Costa Rica, El Salvador
- Beloglottis hameri Garay in F.Hamer - Costa Rica, El Salvador, Honduras, Nicaragua
- Beloglottis mexicana Garay & Hamer in F.Hamer - El Salvador, Honduras, Nicaragua, Guatemala, Veracruz, Oaxaca
- Beloglottis subpandurata (Ames & C.Schweinf.) Garay - Costa Rica, Honduras, Panama, Guatemala
