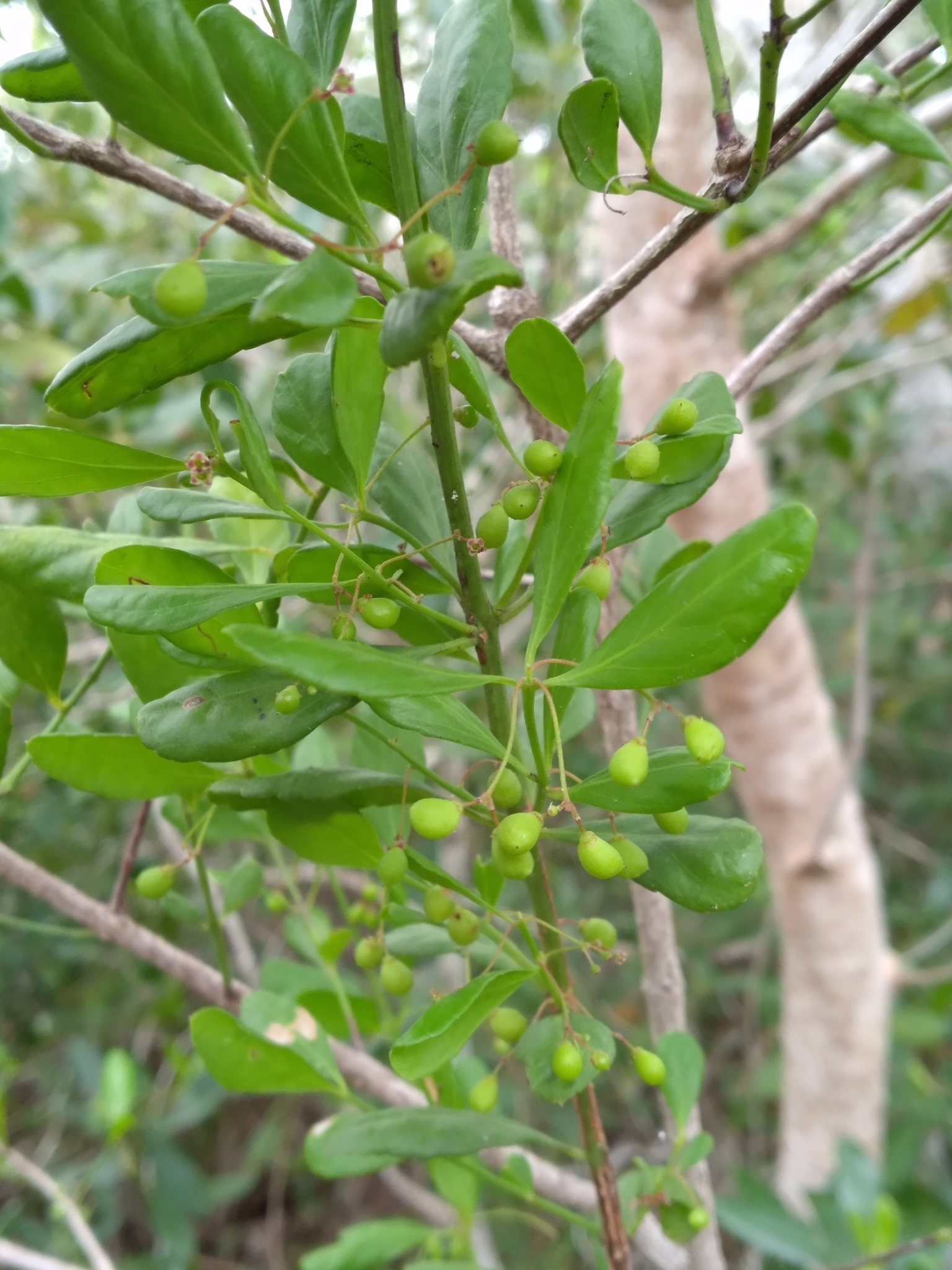
- Gyminda latifolia

Scientific classification
- Kingdom: Plantae
- Clade: Tracheophytes
- Clade: Angiosperms
- Clade: Eudicots
- Clade: Rosids
- Order: Celastrales
- Family: Celastraceae
- Genus: Gyminda (Griseb.) Sarg. (1891)

Species
- 4; see text

= Gyminda =

Genus of flowering plants

Gyminda (false box) is a genus of flowering plants in the family Celastraceae. It includes four species native to Mexico, Central America, Florida, and the Caribbean Islands.

- Gyminda fimbrillata Lundell
- Gyminda latifolia (Sw.) Urb.
- Gyminda orbicularis Borh. & O.Muñiz
- Gyminda tonduzii Loes.
