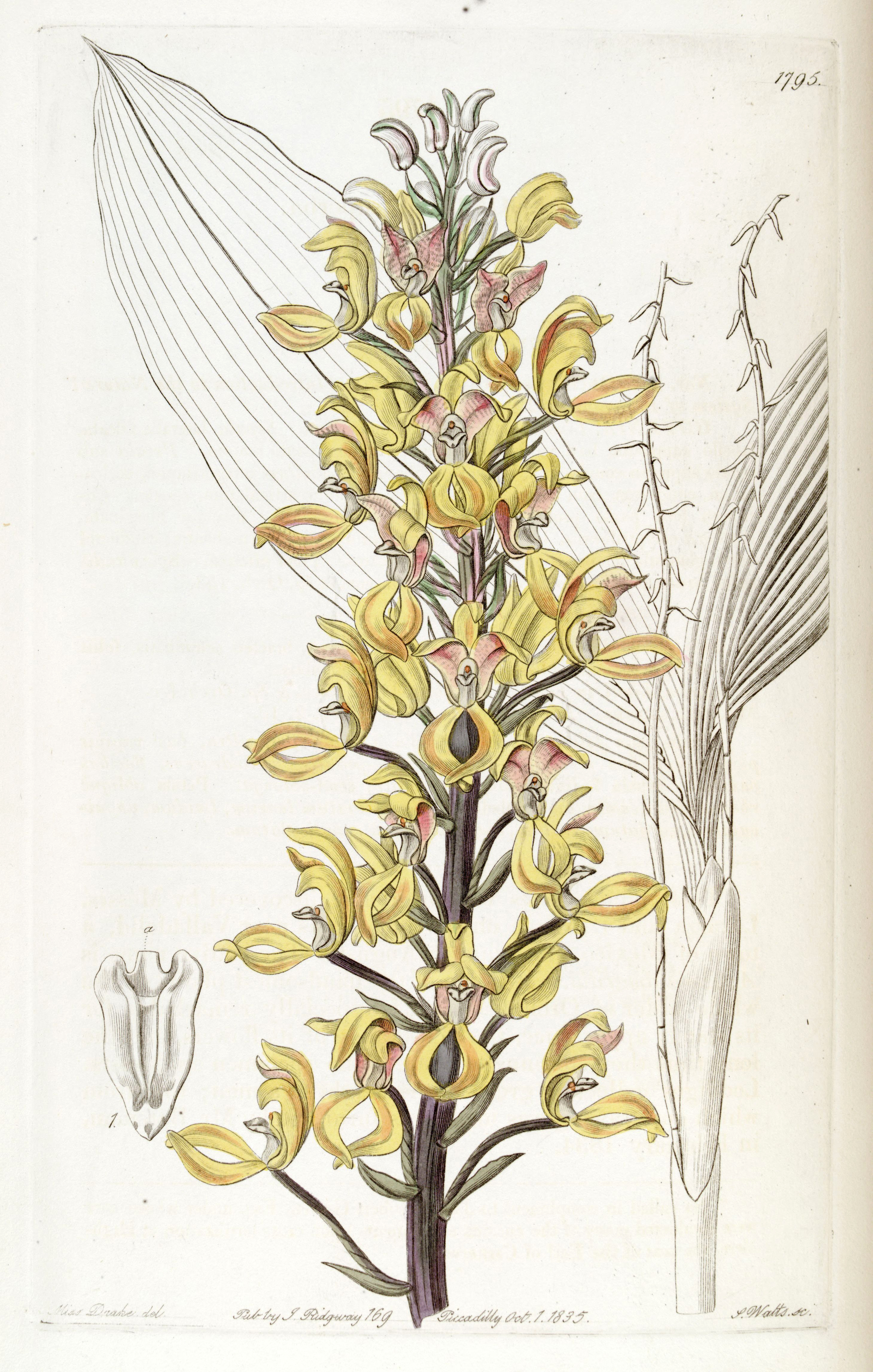
- 1836 illustration

Scientific classification
- Kingdom: Plantae
- Clade: Tracheophytes
- Clade: Angiosperms
- Clade: Monocots
- Order: Asparagales
- Family: Orchidaceae
- Subfamily: Epidendroideae
- Genus: Govenia
- Species: G. superba

Binomial name
- Govenia superba (Lex.) Lindl.

Synonyms
- Maxillaria superba Lex. (basionym)

= Govenia superba =

Species of orchid

Govenia superba is a species of orchid. Its natural range runs from central Mexico south to Honduras.
