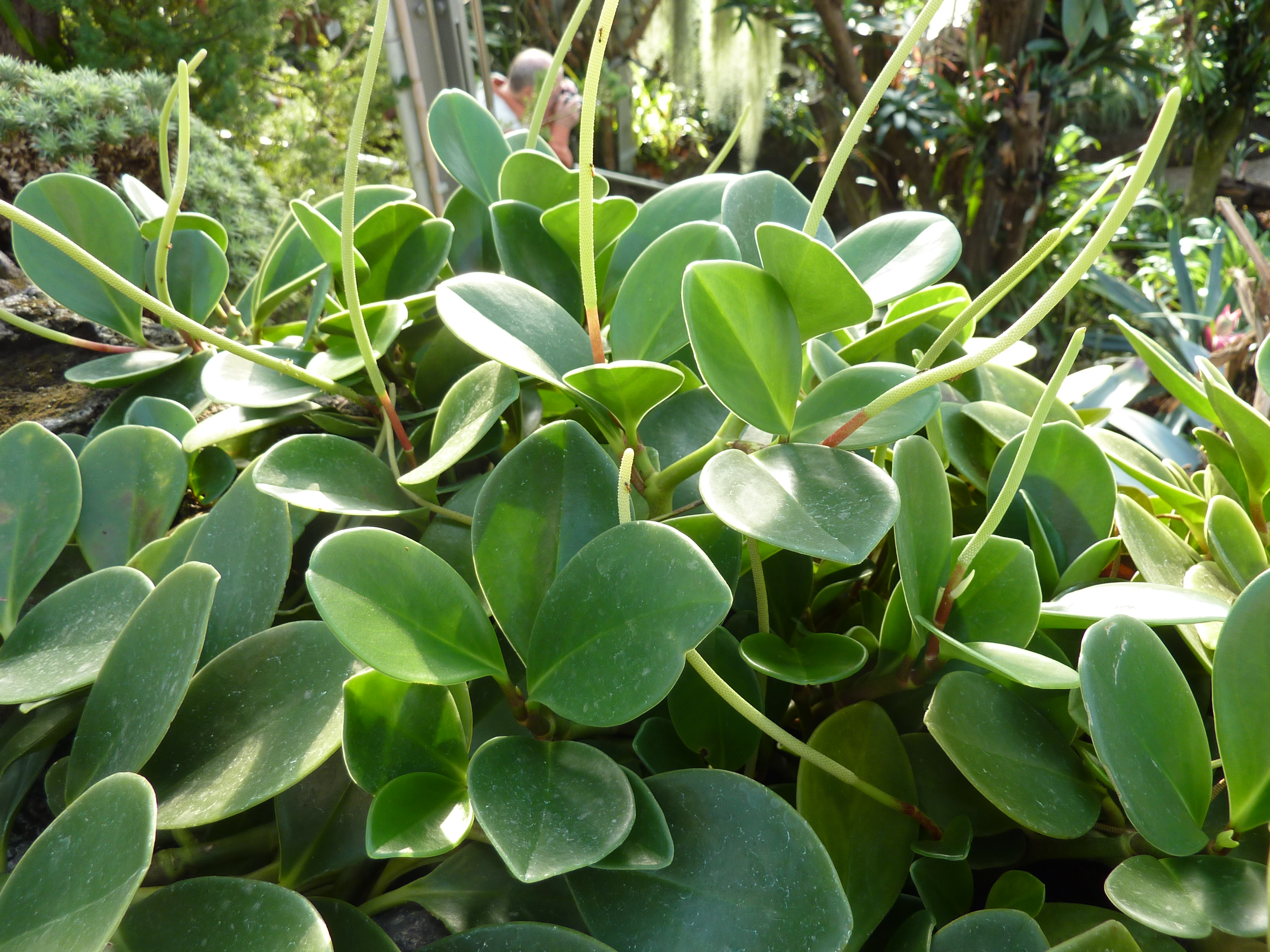

Scientific classification
- Kingdom: Plantae
- Clade: Tracheophytes
- Clade: Angiosperms
- Clade: Magnoliids
- Order: Piperales
- Family: Piperaceae
- Genus: Peperomia
- Species: P. magnoliifolia

Binomial name
- Peperomia magnoliifolia (Jacq.) A.Dietr.

= Peperomia magnoliifolia =

Species of plant

Peperomia magnoliifolia, commonly known as the spoonleaf peperomia, is a species of plant in the genus Peperomia. Its native range reaches from parts of southern Florida and Mexico to the Caribbean and northern South America including Uruguay.

P. magnoliifolia is sometimes confused with Peperomia obtusifolia, and some earlier botanists considered these two names merely synonyms for the same species. As dried specimens the plants can look highly similar but the differences can be seen more easily from living plants: P. obtusifolia leaves are waxy while P. mangoliifolia leaves are considered fleshy. But because of the confusion plants in collections or being sold might continue to be falsely labelled.
