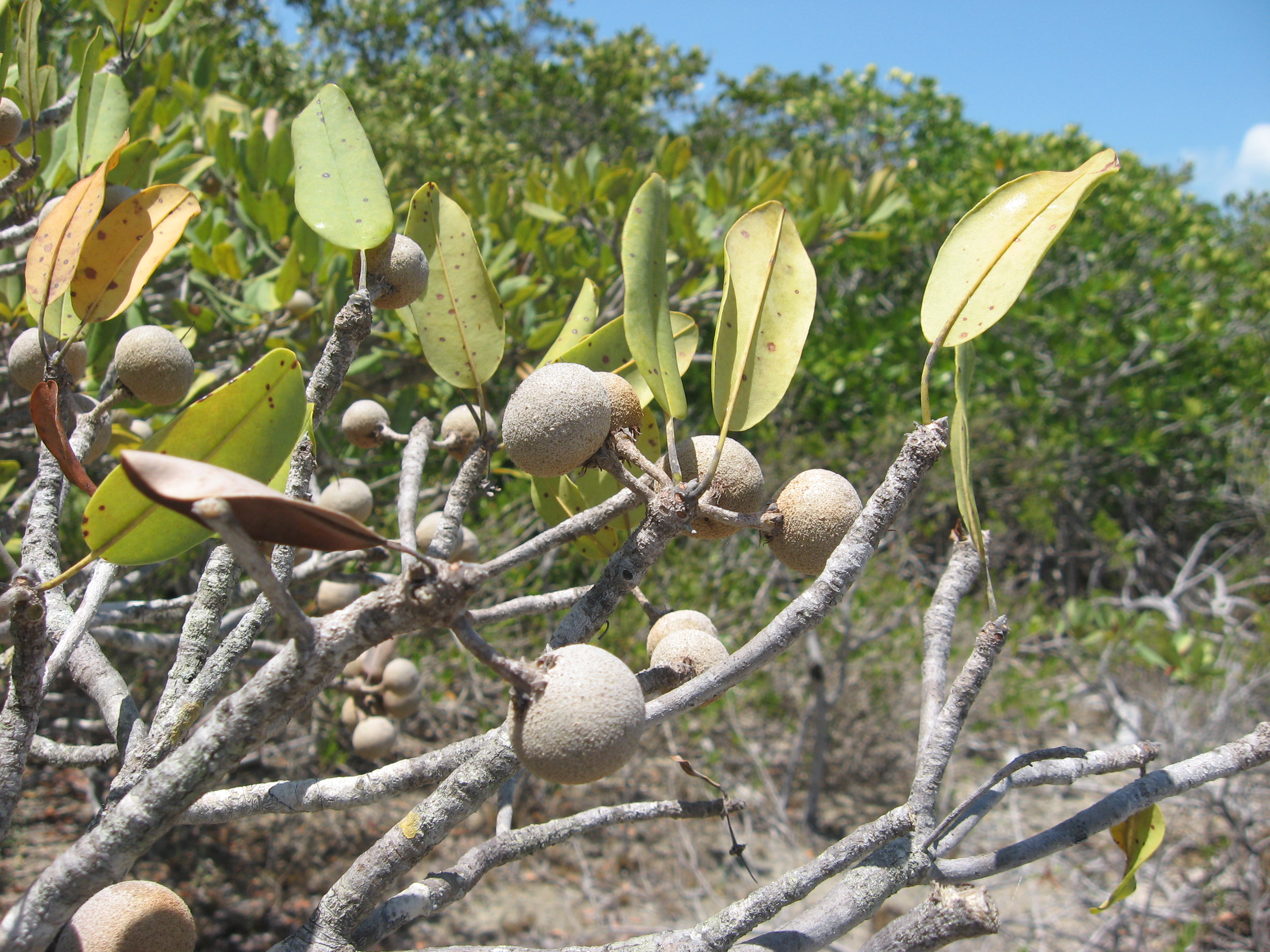
- Manilkara jaimiqui ssp. emarginata

Conservation status
- Least Concern (IUCN 3.1)

- Apparently Secure (NatureServe)

Scientific classification
- Kingdom: Plantae
- Clade: Tracheophytes
- Clade: Angiosperms
- Clade: Eudicots
- Clade: Asterids
- Order: Ericales
- Family: Sapotaceae
- Genus: Manilkara
- Species: M. jaimiqui

Binomial name
- Manilkara jaimiqui (C.Wright ex Griseb.) Dubard

Synonyms
- Manilkara emarginata subsp. jaimiqui (C.Wright ex Griseb.) Cronquist; Mimusops jaimiqui C.Wright ex Griseb.

= Manilkara jaimiqui =

Species of flowering plant

Manilkara jaimiqui, commonly known as wild dilly, is a woody plant in the family Sapotaceae. It is native to tropical regions of North America, where it is found in the West Indies and south Florida. Its natural habitat is areas of coastal hammocks and pine rocklands.

It is a small tree or shrub with thick evergreen leaves. It produces small yellow flowers throughout the year, and has large scaly fruits.

This species is divided into four well-marked subspecies, which show little geographic overlap. They are:

- M. jaimiqui subsp. emarginata - The Bahamas and south Florida
- M. jaimiqui subsp. haitensis - Dominican Republic and Haiti
- M. jaimiqui subsp. jaimiqui - Cuba (Pinar del Río and Oriente), and Jamaica
- M. jaimiqui subsp. wrightiana - Cuba (central area, occasionally in Oriente)
