= Gyminda orbicularis =

Conservation status
- Vulnerable (IUCN 2.3)

Scientific classification
- Kingdom: Plantae
- Clade: Tracheophytes
- Clade: Angiosperms
- Clade: Eudicots
- Clade: Rosids
- Order: Celastrales
- Family: Celastraceae
- Genus: Gyminda
- Species: G. orbicularis

Binomial name
- Gyminda orbicularis Borh. & Muniz

Species of flowering plant

Gyminda orbicularis is a species of plant in the family Celastraceae. It is endemic to Cuba.
