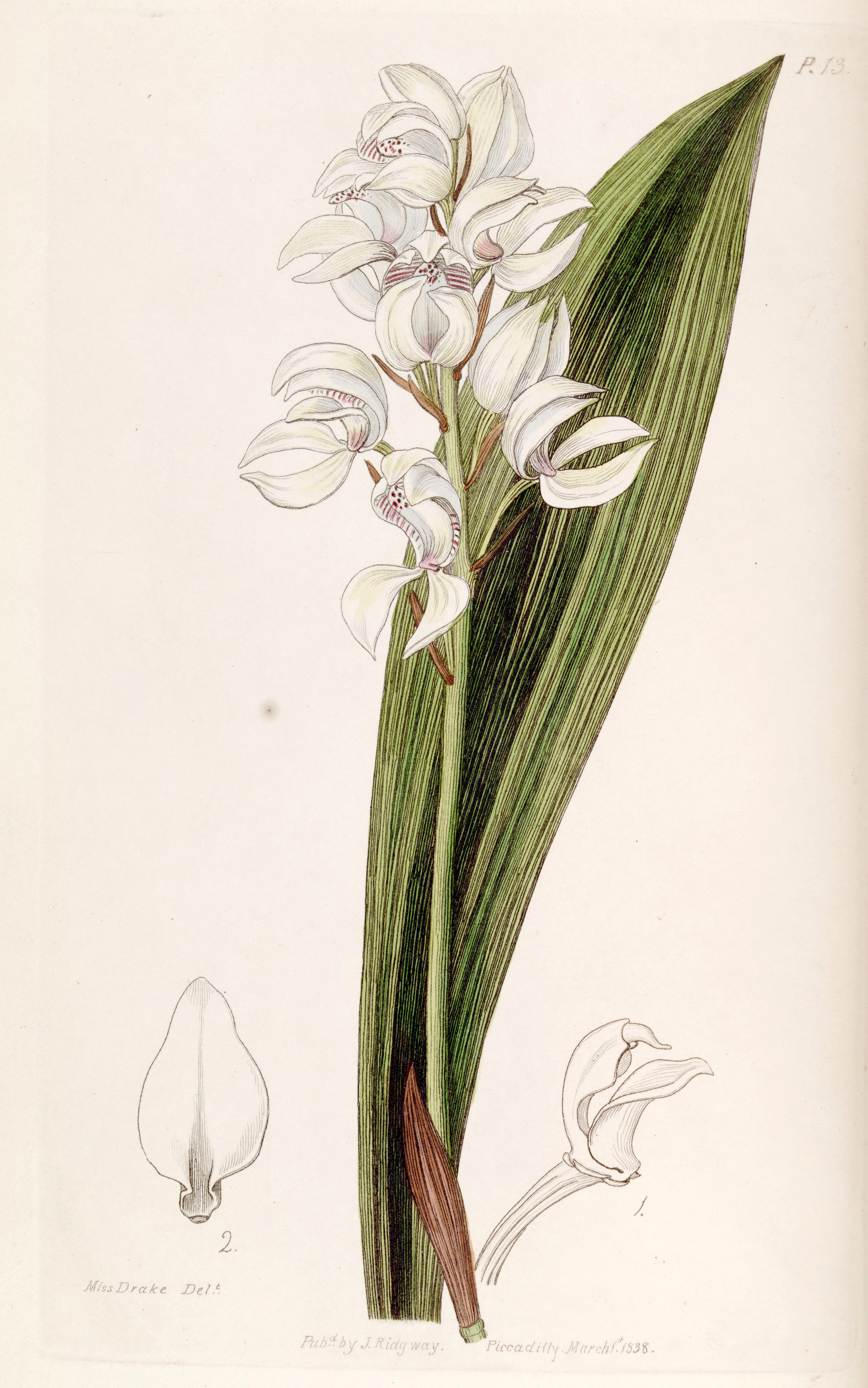
- 1838 illustration

Scientific classification
- Kingdom: Plantae
- Clade: Embryophytes
- Clade: Tracheophytes
- Clade: Spermatophytes
- Clade: Angiosperms
- Clade: Monocots
- Order: Asparagales
- Family: Orchidaceae
- Subfamily: Epidendroideae
- Genus: Govenia
- Species: G. liliacea

Binomial name
- Govenia liliacea (Lex.) Lindl.

Synonyms
- Govenia deliciosa Rchb.f.; Maxillaria liliacea Lex. (basionym); Eulophia liliacea (Lex.) Lindl.; Eucnemis brevilabris Lindl.; Govenia brevilabris (Lindl.) Hemsl.

= Govenia liliacea =

Species of orchid

Govenia liliacea is a species of orchid. Its native range extends from Chihuahua south to Panama.
