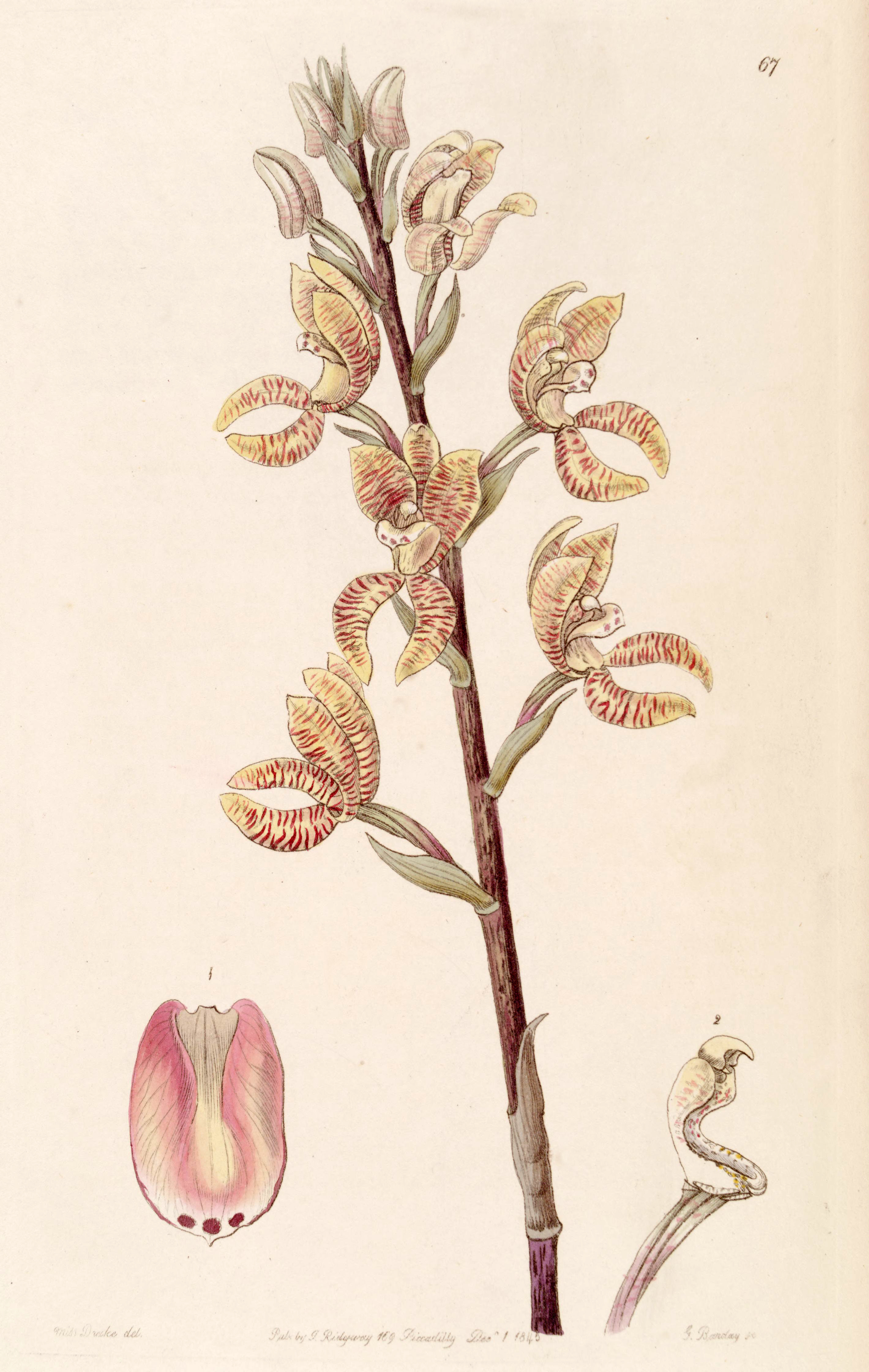
- 1845 illustration

Scientific classification
- Kingdom: Plantae
- Clade: Tracheophytes
- Clade: Angiosperms
- Clade: Monocots
- Order: Asparagales
- Family: Orchidaceae
- Subfamily: Epidendroideae
- Genus: Govenia
- Species: G. fasciata

Binomial name
- Govenia fasciata Lindl.

= Govenia fasciata =

Species of orchid

Govenia fasciata is a species of orchid endemic to Venezuela.
