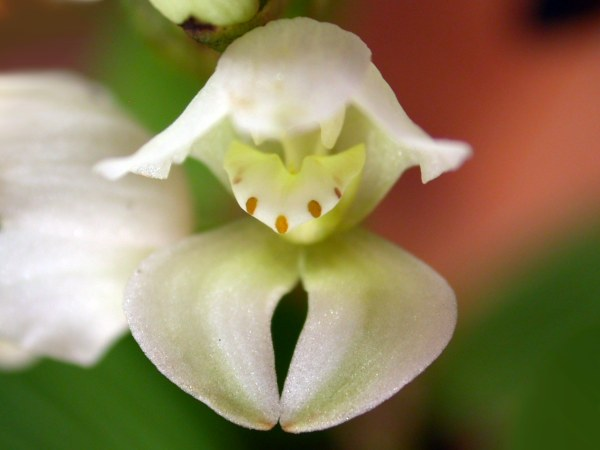

Scientific classification
- Kingdom: Plantae
- Clade: Tracheophytes
- Clade: Angiosperms
- Clade: Monocots
- Order: Asparagales
- Family: Orchidaceae
- Subfamily: Epidendroideae
- Genus: Govenia
- Species: G. utriculata

Binomial name
- Govenia utriculata (Sw.) Lindl.

Synonyms
- Limodorum utriculatum Sw. (1788); Cymbidium utriculatum (Sw.) Sw. (1799); Epidendrum utriculatum (Sw.) Poir. (1810); Govenia capitata Lindl. (1835); Govenia gardneri Hook. (1838); Govenia andrieuxii Rchb.f. (1852); Govenia sulphurea Rchb.f. (1885); Govenia boliviensis Rolfe (1895); Govenia ernsti Schltr. (1919); Govenia platyglossa Schltr. (1920); Govenia powellii Schltr. (1922); Govenia utriculata var. capitata (Lindl.) Correll (1947)

= Govenia utriculata =

Species of orchid

Govenia utriculata is a species of orchid. It is widespread across much of Latin America and the West Indies, from Mexico and Puerto Rico south to Argentina.
