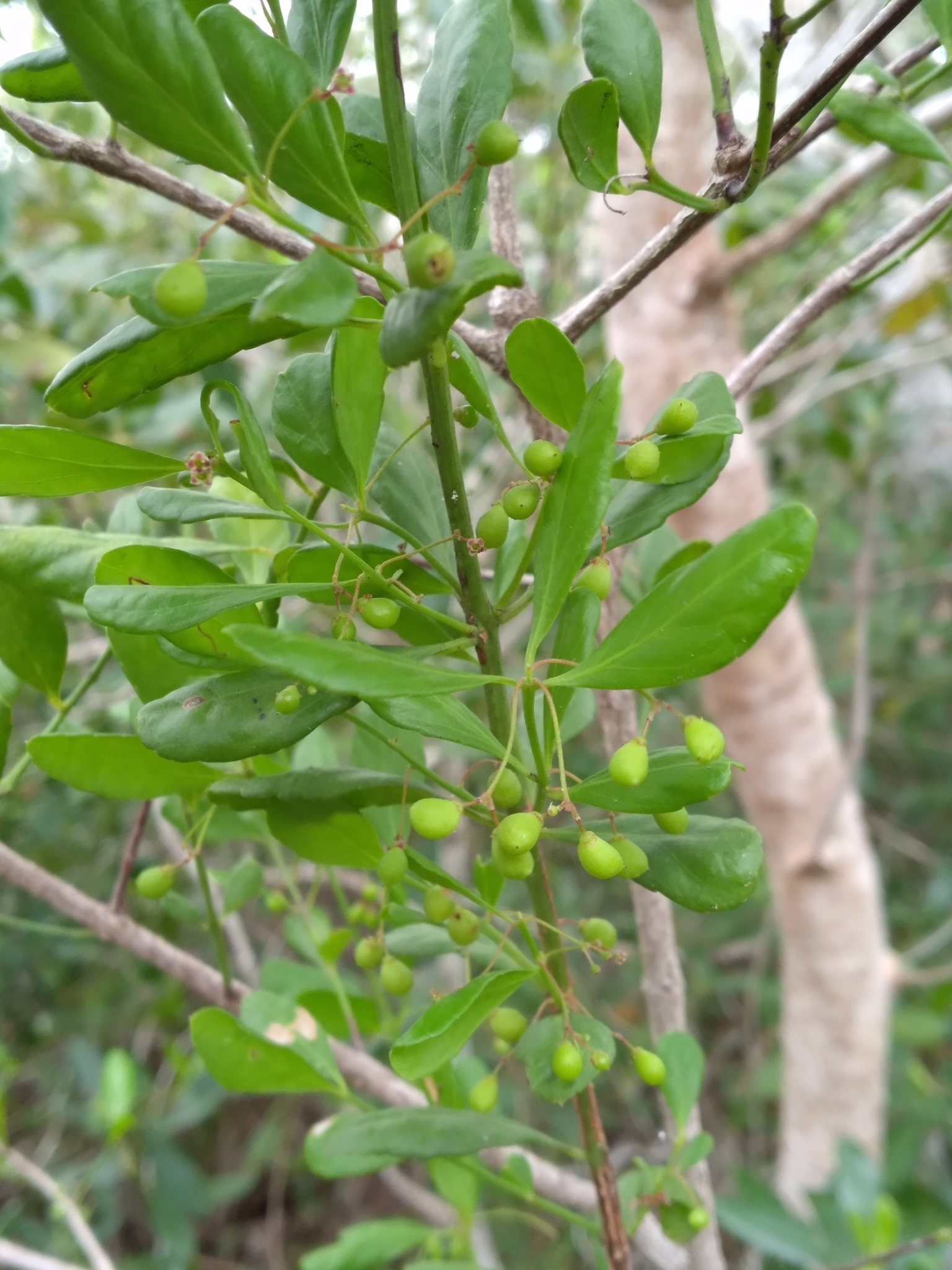
- On Little Pine Key

Conservation status
- Least Concern (IUCN 3.1)

Scientific classification
- Kingdom: Plantae
- Clade: Tracheophytes
- Clade: Angiosperms
- Clade: Eudicots
- Clade: Rosids
- Order: Celastrales
- Family: Celastraceae
- Genus: Gyminda
- Species: G. latifolia

Binomial name
- Gyminda latifolia (Sw.) Urb.

Synonyms
- List: Crossopetalum latifolium (Sw.) Kuntze; Gyminda grisebachii Sarg.; Gyminda grisebachii var. glaucescens Sarg.; Gyminda grisebachii var. glaucifolia (C.Wright ex Griseb.) Sarg.; Gyminda latifolia glaucifolia (C.Wright ex Griseb.) Small; Gyminda latifolia var. glaucescens (Sarg.) Small ex Sarg.; Myginda integrifolia f. glaucifolia C.Wright ex Griseb.; Myginda latifolia Sw.; Myginda latifolia var. styliflora Griseb.; Rhacoma integrifolia M.Gómez; Rhacoma latifolia (Sw.) Loes.; Rhacoma vildosolaeanum M.Gómez

= Gyminda latifolia =

Species of plant

Gyminda latifolia, the West Indian false box, is a species of flowering plant in the family Celastraceae. It is native to coastal Mexico, the Florida Keys, and the islands of the Caribbean. A shrub or tree reaching 7.5 m (25 ft), it is typically found in hammocks 0 to 10 m (0 to 33 ft) above sea level.

== Subtaxa ==
The following subspecies are accepted:

- Gyminda latifolia subsp. glaucifolia (C.Wright ex Griseb.) Mory – western Cuba
- Gyminda latifolia subsp. latifolia – entire range
