= Cyperus fuligineus =

Scientific classification
- Kingdom: Plantae
- Clade: Tracheophytes
- Clade: Angiosperms
- Clade: Monocots
- Clade: Commelinids
- Order: Poales
- Family: Cyperaceae
- Genus: Cyperus
- Species: C. fuligineus

Binomial name
- Cyperus fuligineus Chapm., 1860

Species of sedge

Cyperus fuligineus is a species of sedge that is native to southern parts of North America and parts of the Caribbean.

== See also ==
- List of Cyperus species
