= Ageratum littorale =

Cape Sable whiteweed

Scientific classification
- Kingdom: Plantae
- Clade: Tracheophytes
- Clade: Angiosperms
- Clade: Eudicots
- Clade: Asterids
- Order: Asterales
- Family: Asteraceae
- Genus: Ageratum
- Species: A. littorale

Binomial name
- Ageratum littorale A. Gray

Synonyms
- Ageratum intermedium Hemsley; Carelia littorale (A. Gray) Kuntze

Species of flowering plant

Ageratum littorale, the Cape Sable whiteweed, is a plant species native to Florida, the common name referring to Cape Sable inside Everglades National Park. Some publications (e. g. Flora of North America) consider this as being the same species as the West Indian A. maritimum, but The Plant List accepts the two as distinct taxa. It is their lead that we are following here.

Ageratum littorale grows in beach sand and nearby thickets along the coast as well as hummocks and roadsides at elevations of less than 10 m (33 ft). It is a trailing to decumbent perennial herb up to 50 cm (19.5 in) tall, spreading by means of underground rhizomes. Stems are glabrous except at the nodes. Leaf blades are ovate to oblong, up to 4 cm (1.5 in) long. Flowers are blue, lavender or white, in cyme-like arrays.
