= Pitcairnia moritziana =

Conservation status
- Least Concern (IUCN 3.1)

Scientific classification
- Kingdom: Plantae
- Clade: Tracheophytes
- Clade: Angiosperms
- Clade: Monocots
- Clade: Commelinids
- Order: Poales
- Family: Bromeliaceae
- Genus: Pitcairnia
- Species: P. moritziana

Binomial name
- Pitcairnia moritziana K.Koch & C.D.Bouché

Synonyms
- Hepetis moritziana (K.Koch & C.D.Bouché) Mez; Pitcairnia klotzschiana Baker

Species of flowering plant

Pitcairnia moritziana is a species of flowering plant in the family Bromeliaceae. This species is endemic to Venezuela.
