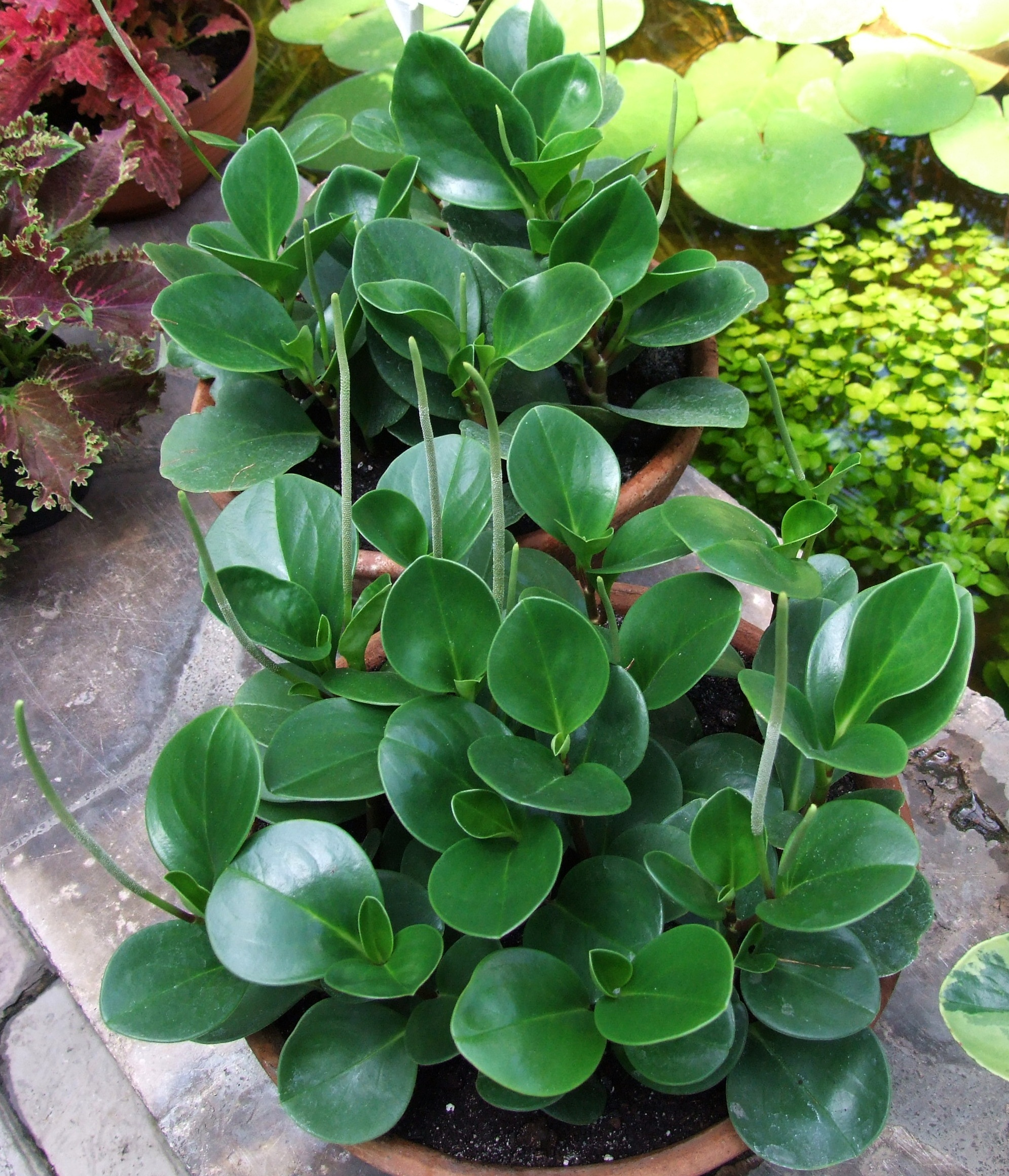

Scientific classification
- Kingdom: Plantae
- Clade: Embryophytes
- Clade: Tracheophytes
- Clade: Spermatophytes
- Clade: Angiosperms
- Clade: Magnoliids
- Order: Piperales
- Family: Piperaceae
- Genus: Peperomia
- Species: P. obtusifolia

Binomial name
- Peperomia obtusifolia (L.) A.Dietr.

= Peperomia obtusifolia =

Species of flowering plant

Peperomia obtusifolia, also known as the baby rubberplant, American rubber plant, or pepper face, is a species of flowering plant in the genus Peperomia under the family Piperaceae, native to Tropical America. The specific epithet obtusifolia means "blunt-leaved". The plant has gained the Royal Horticultural Society's Award of Garden Merit.

== Description ==
The baby rubberplant is an evergreen perennial growing to 25 cm (10 in) tall and broad with cupped leathery leaves and narrow spikes of white flowers up to 12 cm (5 in) long, which grow in a shiny, winding manner and constitute the main decorative value of the plant.

P. obtusifolia is often confused with Peperomia magnoliifolia, and some earlier botanists considered these two names merely synonyms for the same species. As dried specimens, the plants can look highly similar, though the difference can be seen more easily with living plants: P. obtusifolia leaves are waxy, while P. mangoliifolia leaves are considered fleshy. Due to the confusion, plants in collections or on sale may be falsely labelled.

== Cultivation ==
With a minimum temperature of 15 °C (59 °F), the baby rubberplant must be grown indoors in most temperate regions. Although it needs high humidity, it does not require much care. Good lighting is enough to maintain the bright and intense colour of the leaves, though direct light causes discoloration. The stem is fleshy, so the plant does not need abundant or frequent watering. A popular houseplant, numerous cultivars have been developed, some of which show leaf variegation.

== Pests and diseases ==
In general, the baby rubberplant is a resistant plant, though it can have problems with aphids and mealybugs. As with many houseplants, excessive watering can cause root rot.

== Gallery ==
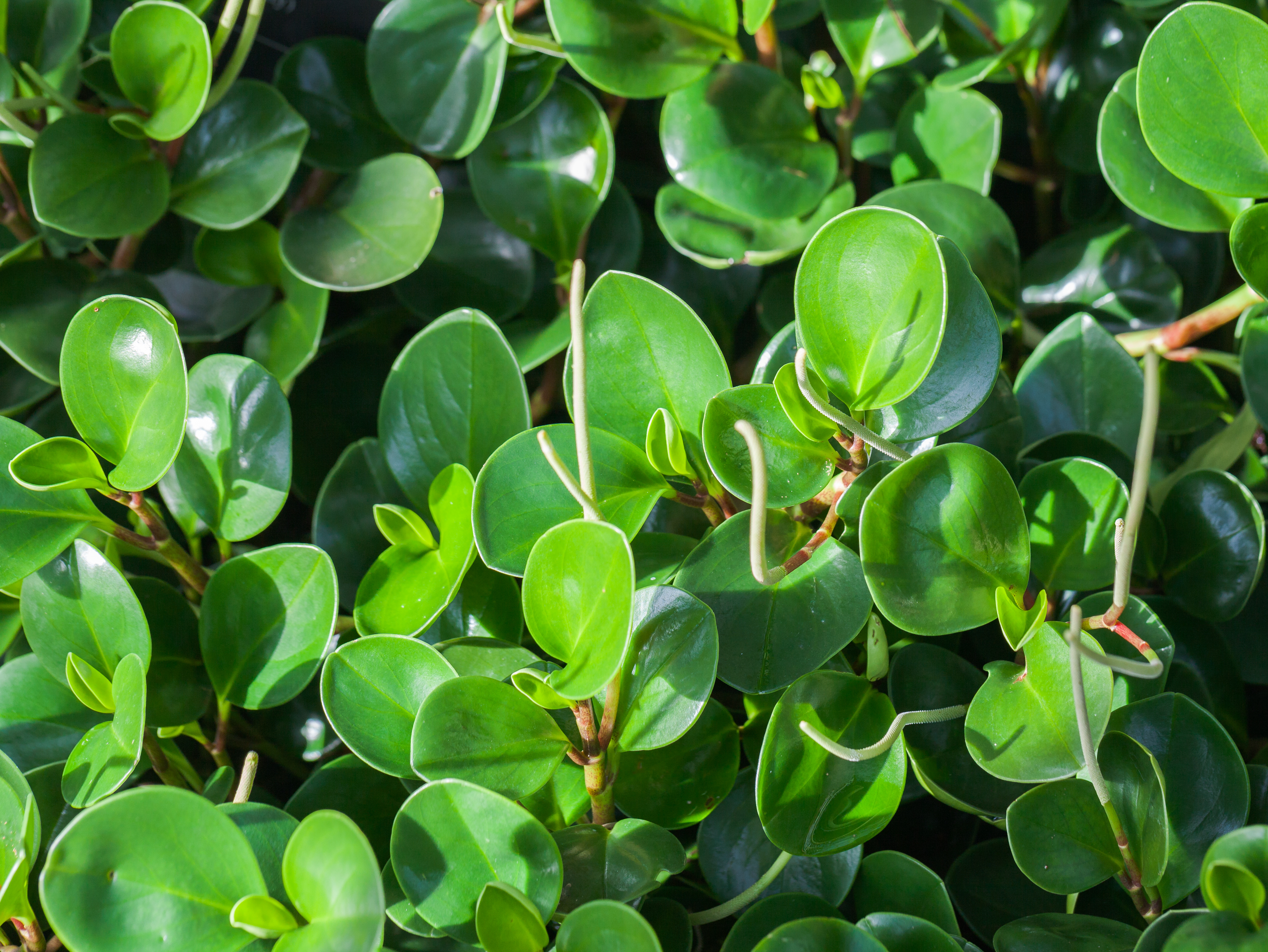
Shrubby setting

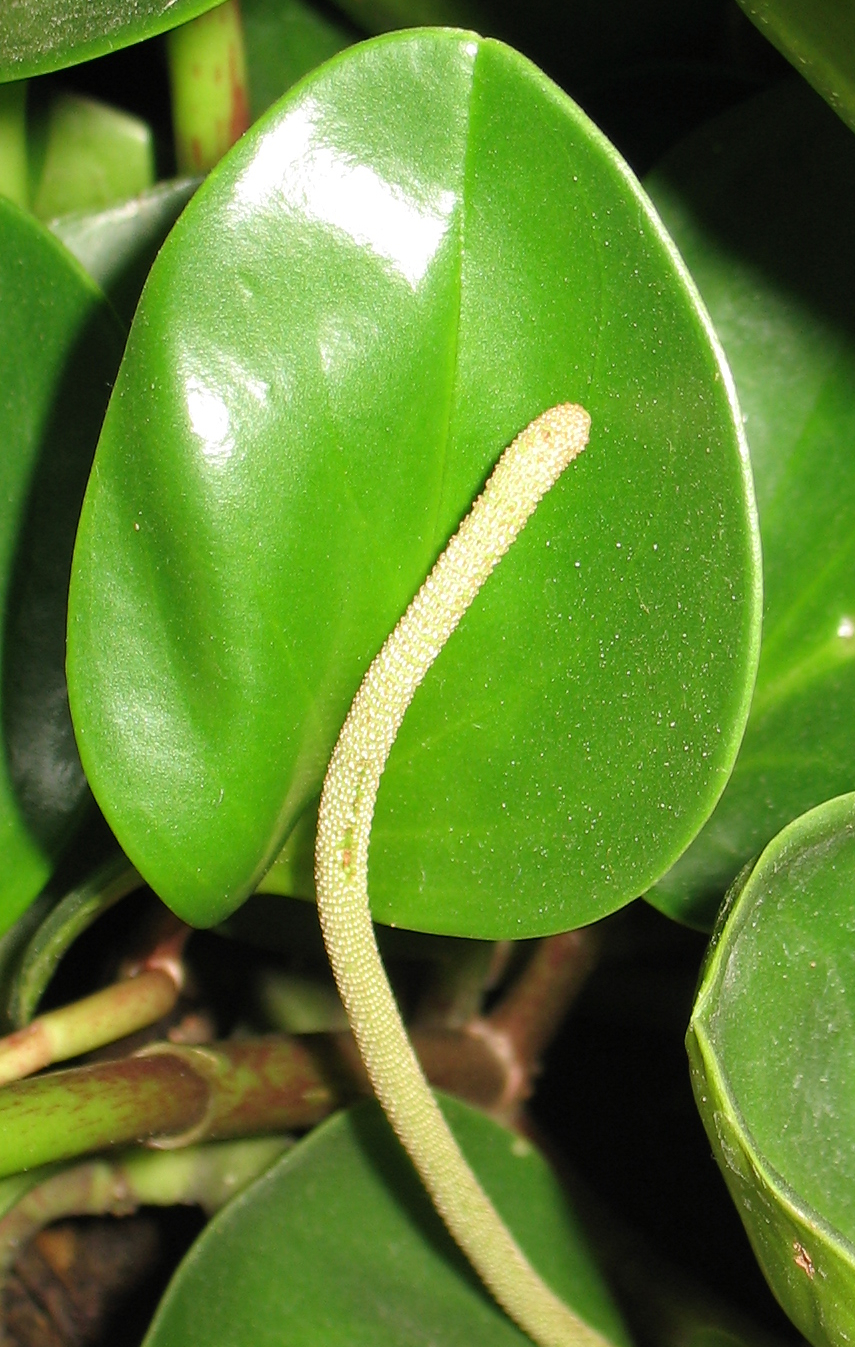
Flower

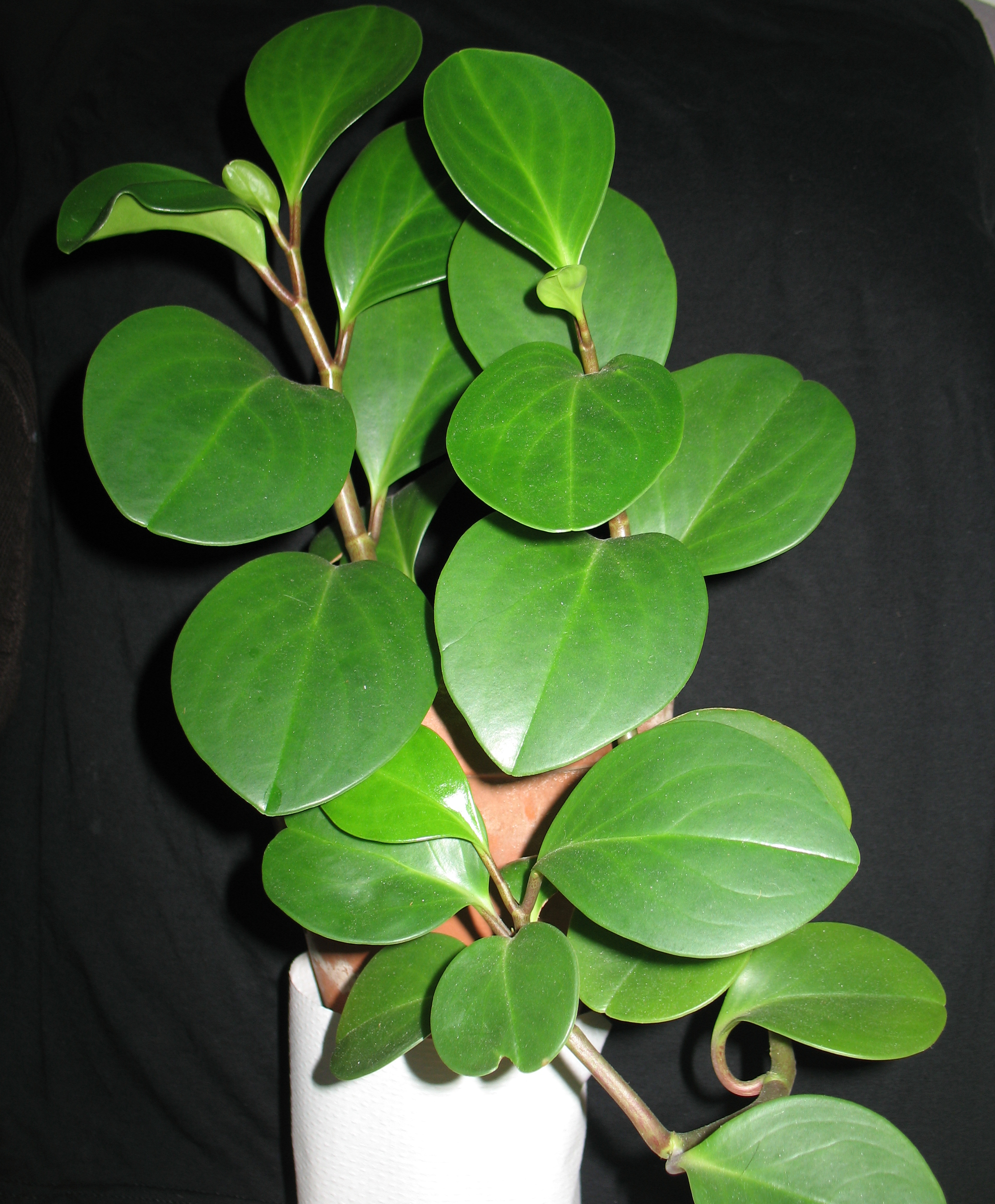
Leafy stem

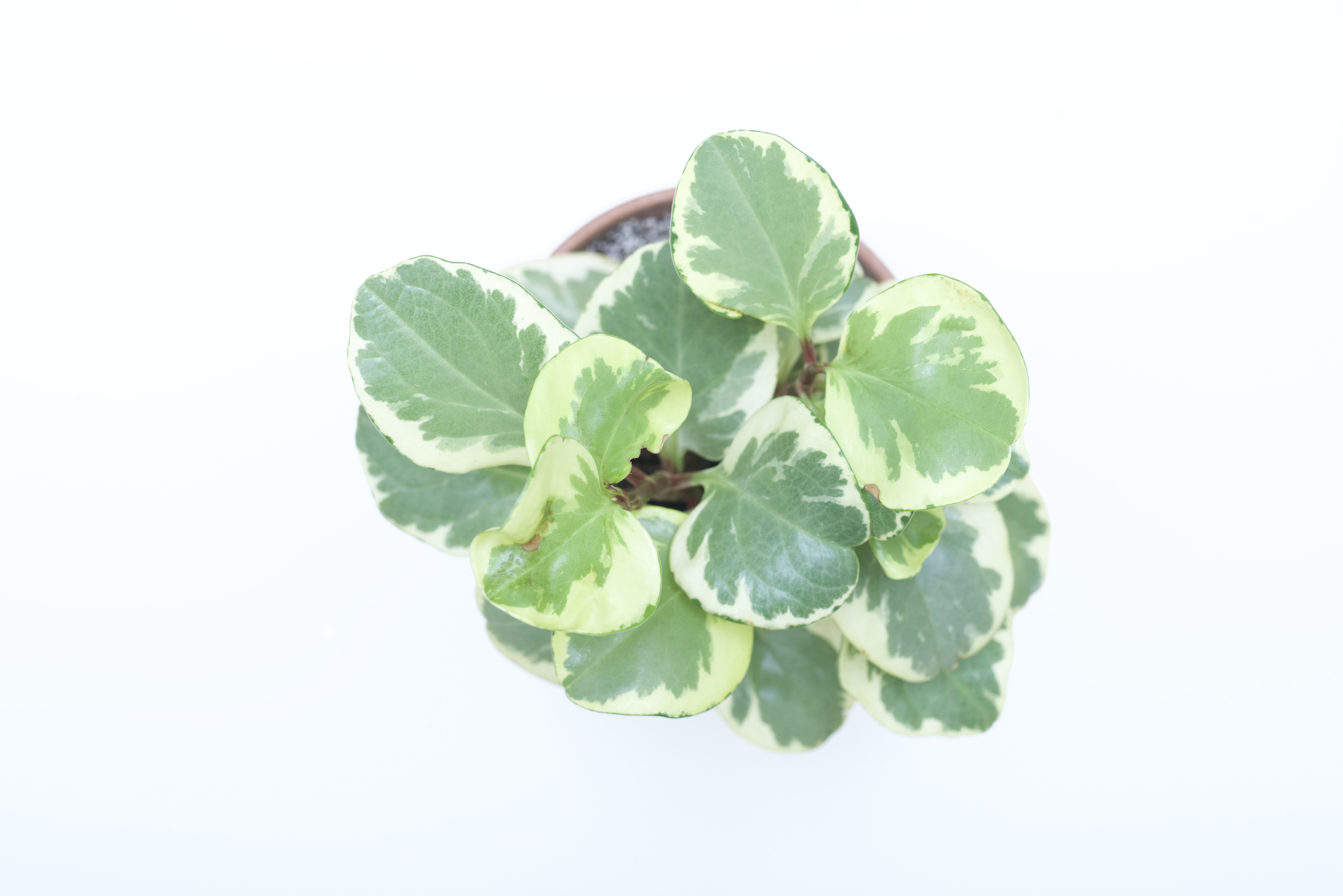
Variegated form

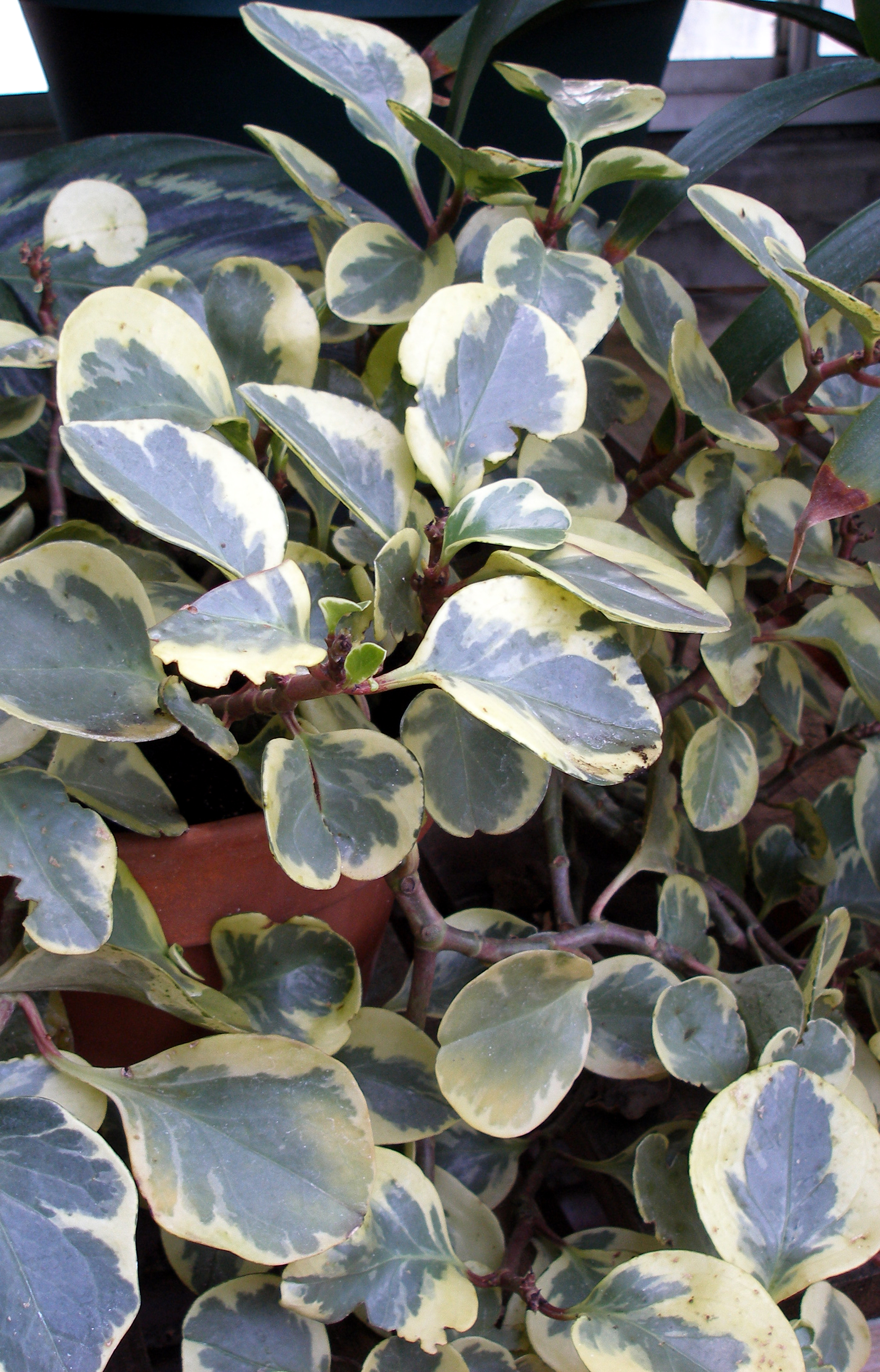
Variegated leaves closeup
