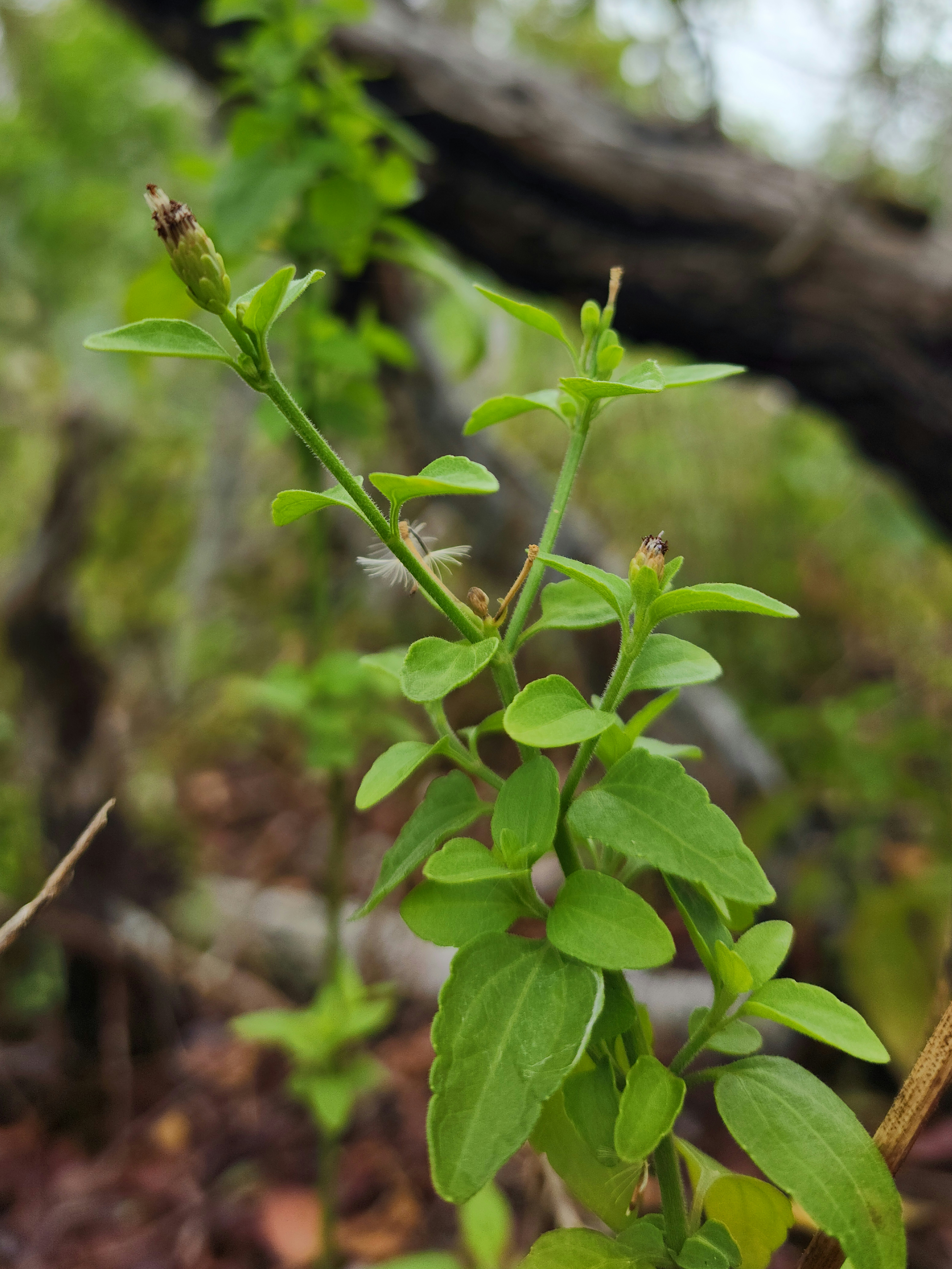
- Growing in understory on margins of Keys cactus barren

Conservation status
- Critically Imperiled (NatureServe)

Scientific classification
- Kingdom: Plantae
- Clade: Tracheophytes
- Clade: Angiosperms
- Clade: Eudicots
- Clade: Asterids
- Order: Asterales
- Family: Asteraceae
- Genus: Chromolaena
- Species: C. frustrata

Binomial name
- Chromolaena frustrata (B.L.Rob.) R.M.King & H.Rob.

Synonyms
- Eupatorium frustratum B.L.Rob.; Osmia frustrata (B.L.Rob.) Small

= Chromolaena frustrata =

Species of flowering plant

Chromolaena frustrata called Cape Sable false thoroughwort or Cape Sable thoroughwort, is a rare North American species of Flowering plant in the family Asteraceae. It is found only in southern Florida, on the Florida Keys, inside Everglades National Park, and other nearby low-lying areas. It grows on coastal rock outcrops, the edges of hammocks, and other undisturbed sites at elevations less than 10 meters (33 feet) above sea level.

Chromolaena frustrata is a perennial herb rarely more than 25 cm (10 inches) tall. Flower heads are produced in groups of 2–6. The heads contain blue or lavender disc florets but no ray florets.
