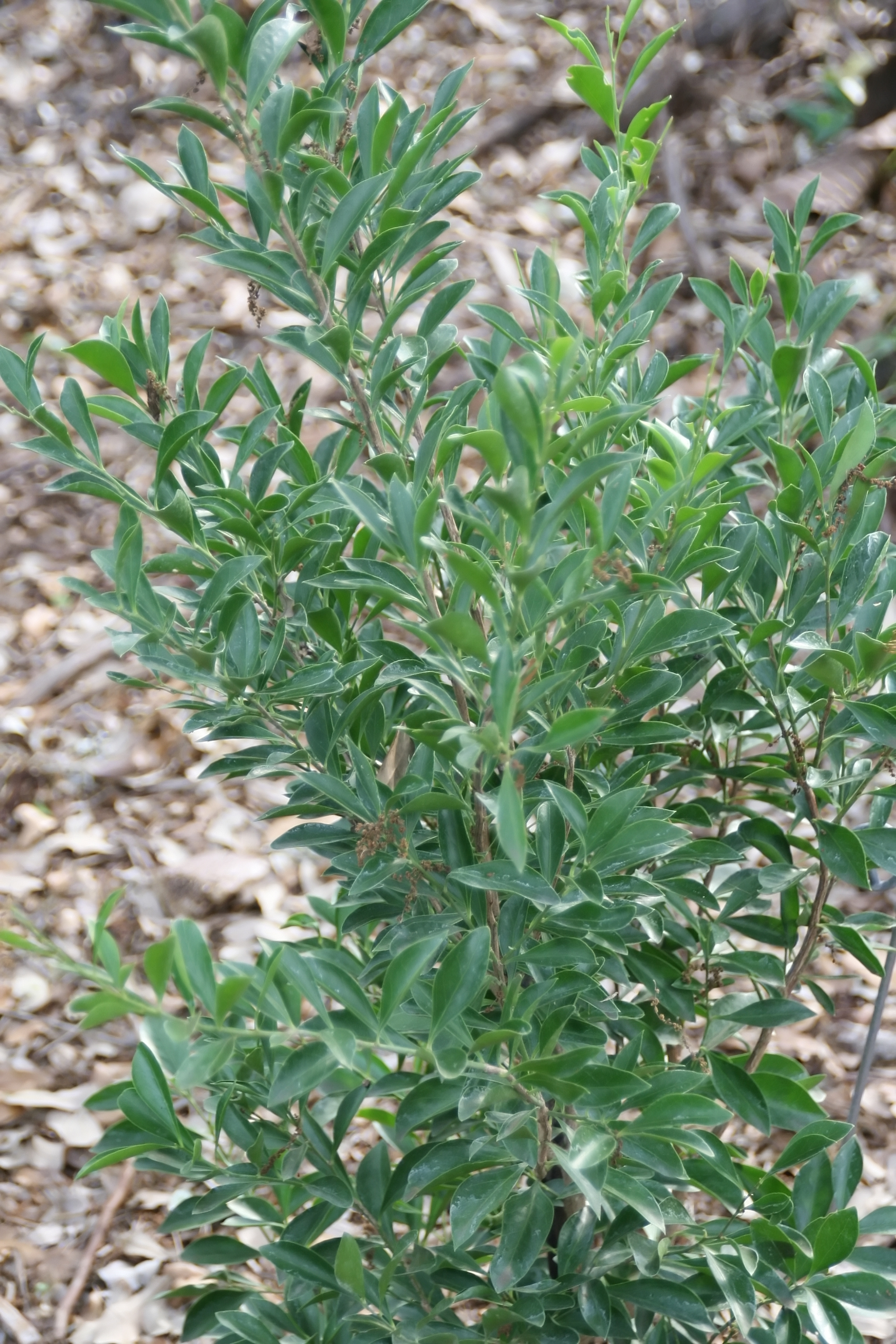
- Schaefferia frutescens photographed at the Fairchild Tropical Botanic Garden

Conservation status
- Least Concern (IUCN 3.1)

Scientific classification
- Kingdom: Plantae
- Clade: Tracheophytes
- Clade: Angiosperms
- Clade: Eudicots
- Clade: Rosids
- Order: Celastrales
- Family: Celastraceae
- Genus: Schaefferia
- Species: S. frutescens

Binomial name
- Schaefferia frutescens Jacq.

Synonyms
- Schaefferia completa Sw. S. frutescens var. buxifolia DC. Schaefferia buxifolia (DC.) Nutt.

= Schaefferia frutescens =

Species of flowering plant

Schaefferia frutescens, the Florida-boxwood, is a species of flowering plant in the family Celastraceae, that is native to tropical regions of the Americas, from southern Florida in the United States, south through the Caribbean to Central America and northwestern South America (Colombia, Venezuela, Ecuador), and also Veracruz in Mexico. It grows at close to sea level in Florida, and up to 600 m altitude in Puerto Rico.

It is an evergreen shrub or rarely a small tree growing to 4–5 m tall (exceptionally to 8 m), usually with several stems from the base; stem size is up to 18 cm diameter. The bark is smooth light gray, roughened by many narrow ridges. The leaves are leathery, yellow-green, 4–7 cm long and 12–25 mm broad. The flowers are small, pale green to whitish, produced in small clusters in the leaf axils. The fruit is an orange red to red berry 4–8 mm diameter.
