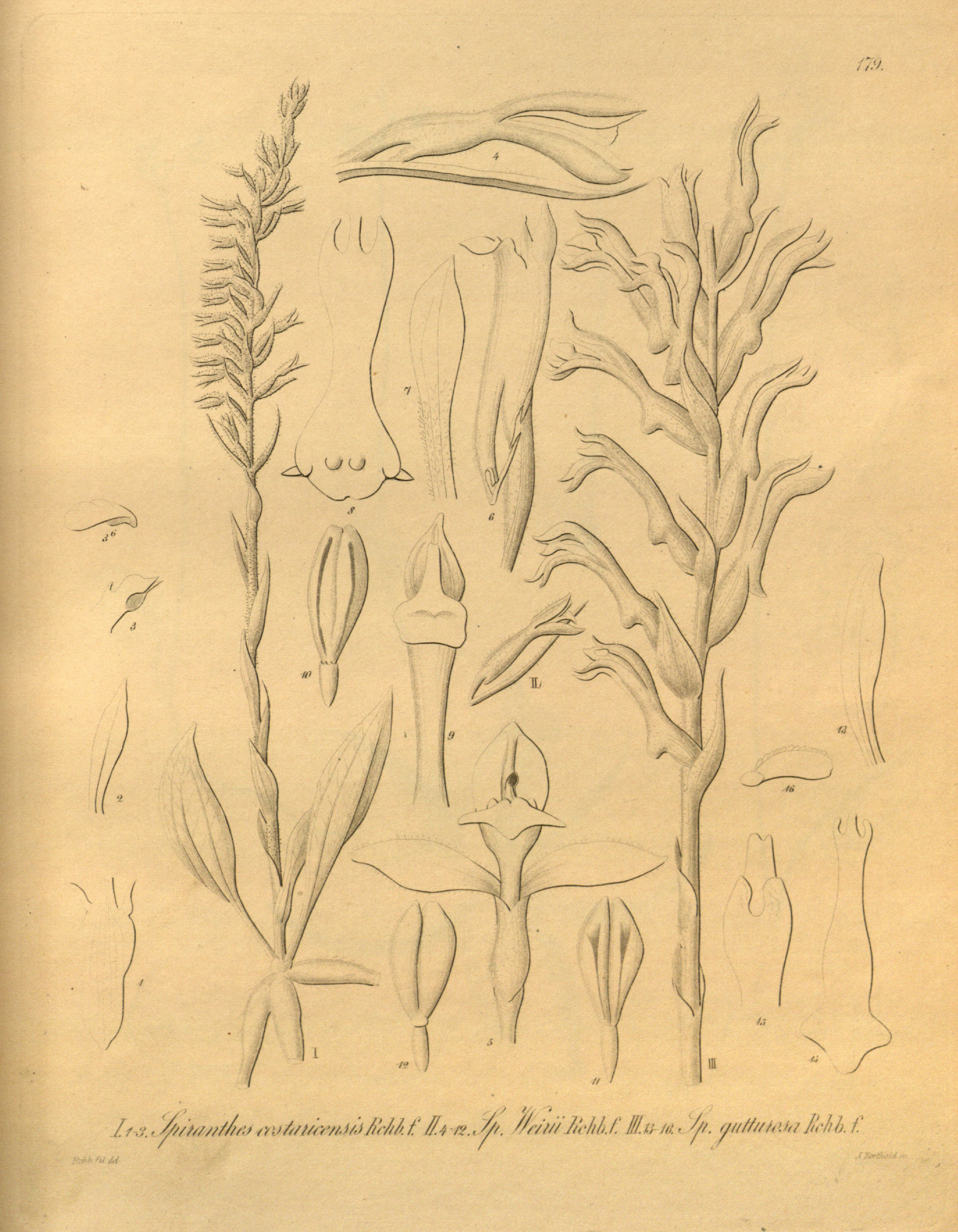
- Beloglottis costaricensis (syn. Spiranthes costaricensis) - Xenia v. 2 (1874)

Conservation status
- Apparently Secure (NatureServe)

Scientific classification
- Kingdom: Plantae
- Clade: Tracheophytes
- Clade: Angiosperms
- Clade: Monocots
- Order: Asparagales
- Family: Orchidaceae
- Subfamily: Orchidoideae
- Tribe: Cranichideae
- Genus: Beloglottis
- Species: B. costaricensis

Binomial name
- Beloglottis costaricensis (Rchb.f.) Schltr.

Synonyms
- Spiranthes costaricensis Rchb.f.; Gyrostachys costaricensis (Rchb.f.) Kuntze; Spiranthes bicaudata Ames; Beloglottis bicaudata (Ames) Garay

= Beloglottis costaricensis =

Species of flowering plant

Beloglottis costaricensis is a terrestrial species of orchid. It has a wide distribution, reported from Mexico (from San Luis Potosí south to Chiapas), Central America (all 7 countries), the West Indies (Trinidad, Dominican Republic and Cayman Islands), South America (Colombia, Venezuela, Suriname, Brazil, Ecuador, Peru, Bolivia), and Dade County Florida.
