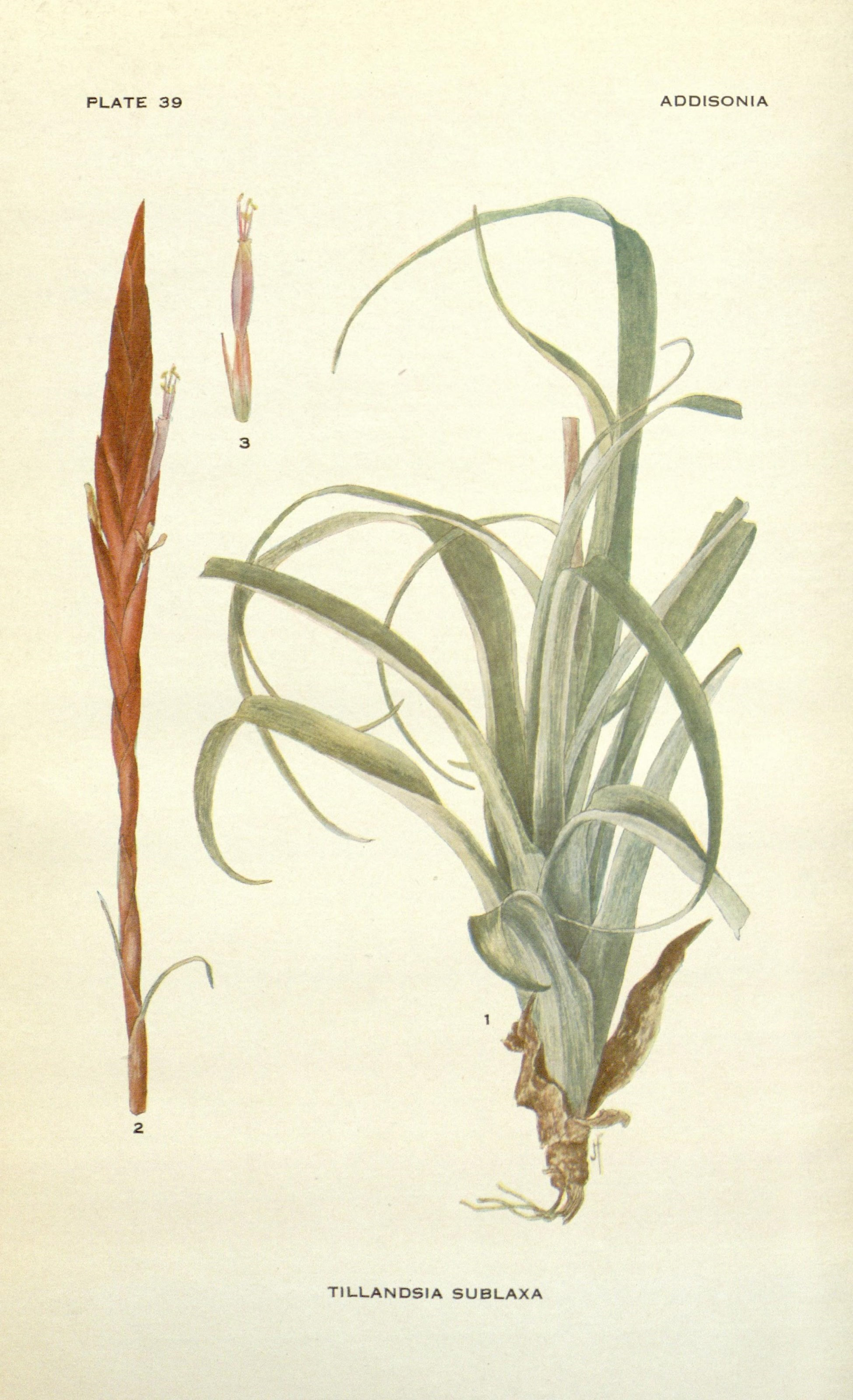
- Illustration as Tillandsia sublaxa

Scientific classification
- Kingdom: Plantae
- Clade: Tracheophytes
- Clade: Angiosperms
- Clade: Monocots
- Clade: Commelinids
- Order: Poales
- Family: Bromeliaceae
- Genus: Tillandsia
- Subgenus: Tillandsia subg. Tillandsia
- Species: T. variabilis

Binomial name
- Tillandsia variabilis Schltdl.

Synonyms
- Platystachys moritziana Beer; Tillandsia brachypoda Baker; Tillandsia domingensis Mez; Tillandsia houzeavii Chapm.; Tillandsia laxa Griseb.; Tillandsia moritziana Beer; Tillandsia polystachia var. alba Wittm.; Tillandsia sublaxa Baker; Tillandsia valenzuelana A. Rich.

= Tillandsia variabilis =

Species of plant

Tillandsia variabilis, the leatherleaf airplant, is a species of bromeliad in the genus Tillandsia. This species is native to Bolivia, Costa Rica, Mexico (Veracruz, Oaxaca, San Luis Potosí, Tabasco, Chiapas, Yucatán, Puebla), Venezuela, Colombia, the West Indies and southern Florida.

Tillandsia variabilis is an epiphyte growing in the branches of various trees in moist forests. It is up to 40 cm long including the inflorescence, usually single but occasionally in clumps. Leaves are narrowly triangular, soft and brittle, up to 30 cm long. Inflorescence is usually simple, sometimes with 2–3 branches but never palmately branched. Bracts are red, green or purple, less than 1 cm wide, covering and obscuring the rachis. Flowers are lavender to blue, up to 3 cm long.
