= Haw Branch (disambiguation) =

Haw Branch is a historic house in Virginia. Haw Branch may also refer to:

- Haw Branch (Cane Creek), a stream in Missouri
- Haw Branch (Daviess County), a stream in Missouri
