= Sideroxylon marginatum =

Conservation status
- Endangered (IUCN 3.1)

Scientific classification
- Kingdom: Plantae
- Clade: Tracheophytes
- Clade: Angiosperms
- Clade: Eudicots
- Clade: Asterids
- Order: Ericales
- Family: Sapotaceae
- Genus: Sideroxylon
- Species: S. marginatum

Binomial name
- Sideroxylon marginatum (Decne. ex Webb) Cout.

Synonyms
- Sideroxylon mirmulano var. marginata; Calvaria marginata (Decne. ex Webb) Dubard; Sapota marginata Decne. ex Webb

Species of flowering plant

Sideroxylon marginatum is a species of flowering plant in the family Sapotaceae. It is endemic to the Cape Verde Islands, where it is a mesophytic species whose habitat is now limited to steep escarpments and inaccessible places. It is threatened by continued habitat loss.

== Distribution ==
There are records of the species on seven islands in the Cape Verde archipelago – Santo Antão, São Vicente, São Nicolau, Sal, Boavista, Santiago, Fogo, and Brava, between 500 and 1,200 meters elevation. Its range has decreased from human activity, and it is currently extinct in the wild on São Vicente, Sal and Boavista.

== Species delineation ==
It was formerly considered a subspecies (marginata) of Sideroxylon mirmulano, which is native to Madeira. Plants of S. mirmulano from the Canary Islands are now considered Sideroxylon canariense.
