= Sideroxylon reclinatum subsp. austrofloridense =

Conservation status
- Vulnerable (NatureServe)

Scientific classification
- Kingdom: Plantae
- Clade: Embryophytes
- Clade: Tracheophytes
- Clade: Angiosperms
- Clade: Eudicots
- Clade: Asterids
- Order: Ericales
- Family: Sapotaceae
- Genus: Sideroxylon
- Species: S. reclinatum
- Subspecies: S. r. subsp. austrofloridense

Trinomial name
- Sideroxylon reclinatum subsp. austrofloridense (Whetstone) Kartesz & Gandhi

Subspecies of plant

Sideroxylon reclinatum subsp. austrofloridense, known as the Everglades bully, is a species of rare plant native to southern Florida. It was described in 1990.

== Description ==
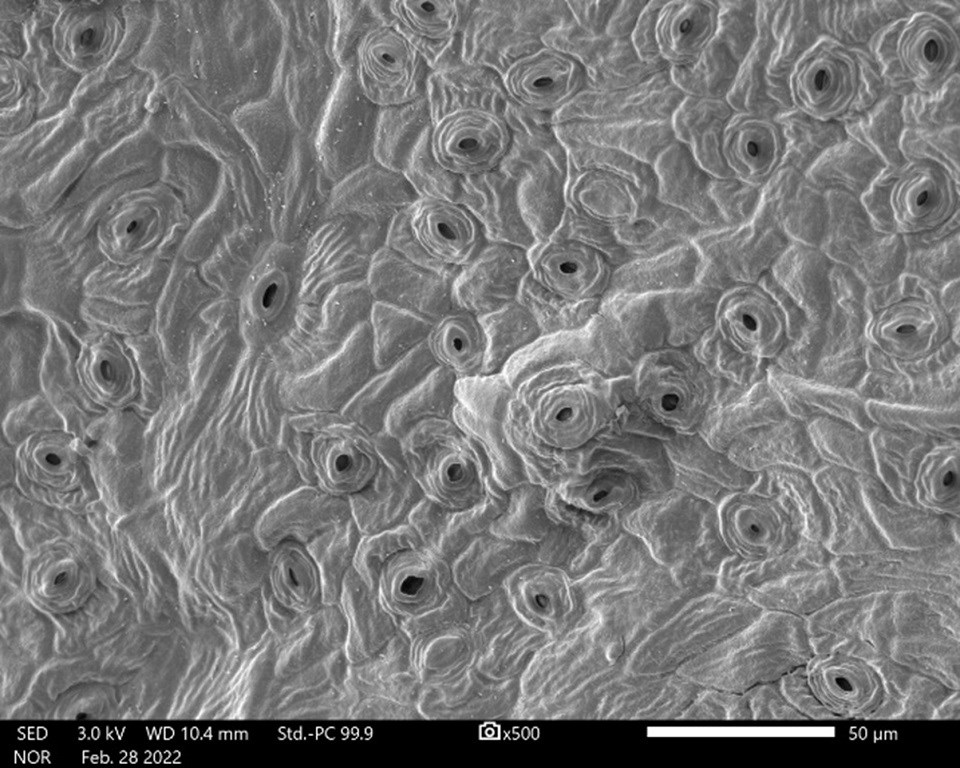
Scanning electron microscope image of S. r. austrofloridense. The cells of the leaf surface (epidermis) have visible grooves. The darker, "mouth-like" openings are stomata.

Everglades bully is a small, thorny shrub with one to several stems. It can grow to be 3–6 ft tall. The plant's oval-shaped leaves are evergreen and typically fuzzy on their undersides. They have clusters of small, white flowers.

It can be distinguished from the more widespread Florida bully (S. r. reclinatum) as the Everglades bully has a fuzzy (or hairy) appearance on the undersides of its leaves, while Florida bully does not.

It is difficult to identify Sideroxylon reclinatum to subspecies in the field. Many individual plants have leaf characteristics (fuzziness on the undersides of the leaves) intermediate between the rare subspecies and the widespread subspecies. Researchers found that the two subspecies could be reliably distinguished from one another by looking at different leaf characteristics of the undersides of the leaves using a high-powered microscope.

== Distribution and habitat ==
The species is only found in southern Florida, where it occurs in the counties of Collier, Miami-Dade, and Monroe. It has been found in Everglades National Park and Big Cypress National Preserve. It typically grows in pine rockland/marl prairie ecotones (or transition areas), but can also grow in either habitat type.

== Threats ==
Everglades bully was listed as threatened by the U.S. Fish and Wildlife Service due to several reasons, including habitat loss and modification from urban and agricultural development, lack of adequate fire management, non-native invasive plants, events such as hurricanes and wildfire, and sea level rise. In Big Cypress National Preserve, pressures include off-road vehicle disturbance, competition with non-native invasive plants, and alterations in natural fire and hydrology patterns.
