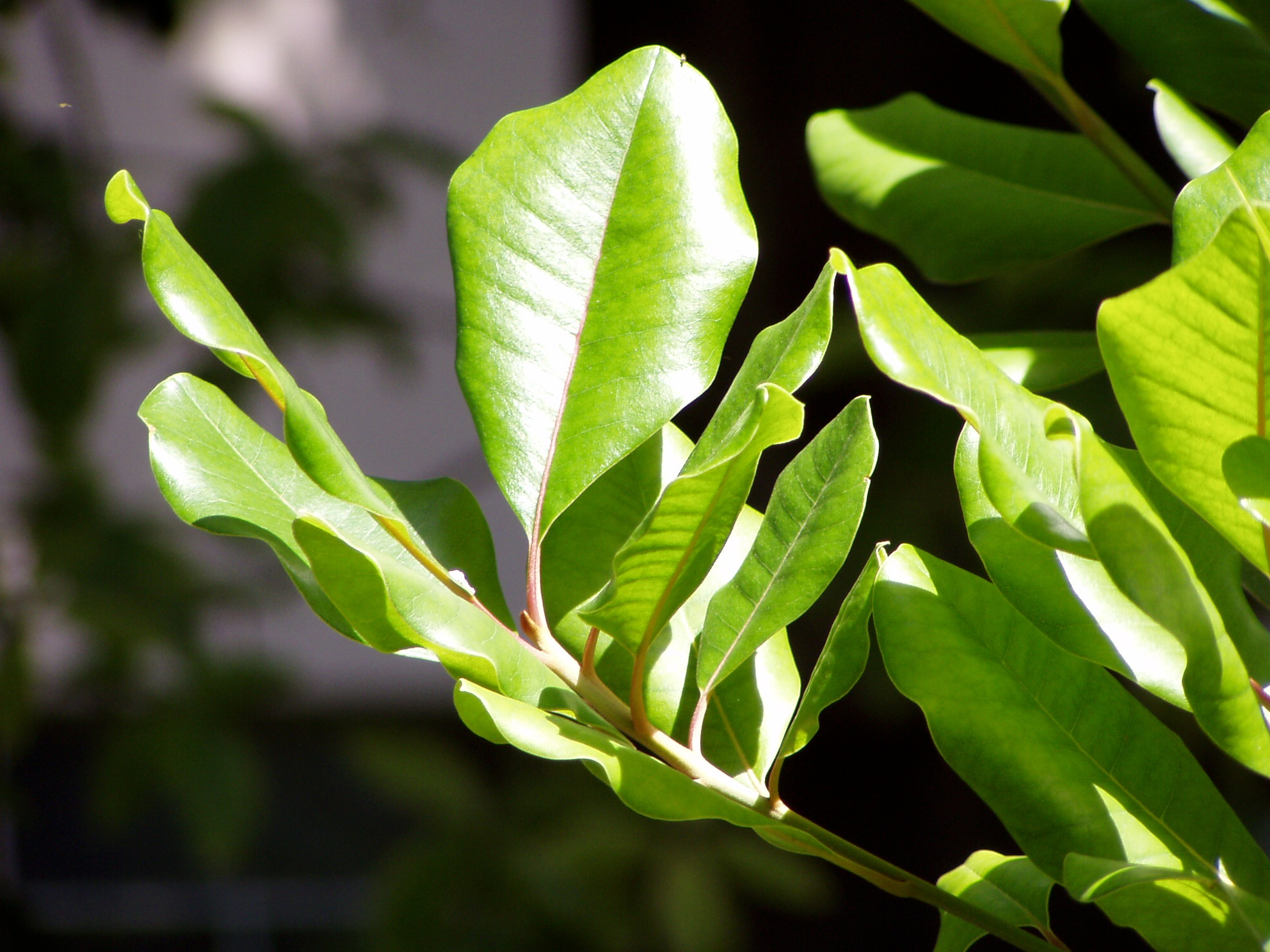
- An example of Sideroxylon mirmulano (ironwood) at the Lisbon Botanical Garden in Portugal

Conservation status
- Endangered (IUCN 3.1)

Scientific classification
- Kingdom: Plantae
- Clade: Tracheophytes
- Clade: Angiosperms
- Clade: Eudicots
- Clade: Asterids
- Order: Ericales
- Family: Sapotaceae
- Genus: Sideroxylon
- Species: S. mirmulano

Binomial name
- Sideroxylon mirmulano R.Br. in C.L.von Buch (1828)

Synonyms
- Calvaria mirmulano (Sol. ex Lowe) Dubard (1912); Sideroxylon mermulana Sol. ex Lowe (1831), orth. var.

= Sideroxylon mirmulano =

Species of flowering plant

Sideroxylon mirmulano, commonly known as marmulano, is a species of flowering plants in the family Sapotaceae. It is endemic to the Madeira Islands (Portugal). It is threatened by habitat loss.

== Description ==
It is an evergreen 3–5 m (9.8–16.4 ft) high tree. Its leathery, elliptic leaves are 5–12 cm (2.0–4.7 in) long and 3–6 cm (1.2–2.4 in) wide. Its flowers are whitish rose to purple with 5 petals measuring up to 7 mm (0.28 in). Its fruit is a drupe, 1 to 1.5 cm (0.39 to 0.59 in) long.

== Distribution and habitat ==
The species is found on Madeira Island, Porto Santo Island and Desertas Islands. It is the dominant species in low coastal forests along the northern shore of Madeira from 0 to 80 m (0 to 262 ft) elevation, and in pockets on the southern side of the island between 200 and 300 meters elevation. It is commonly found with the shrubs Maytenus umbellata and Globularia salicina.

== Systematics ==
The former subspecies marginata from Cape Verde is now considered a separate species: Sideroxylon marginatum. Plants from the Canary Islands are now considered Sideroxylon canariense.
