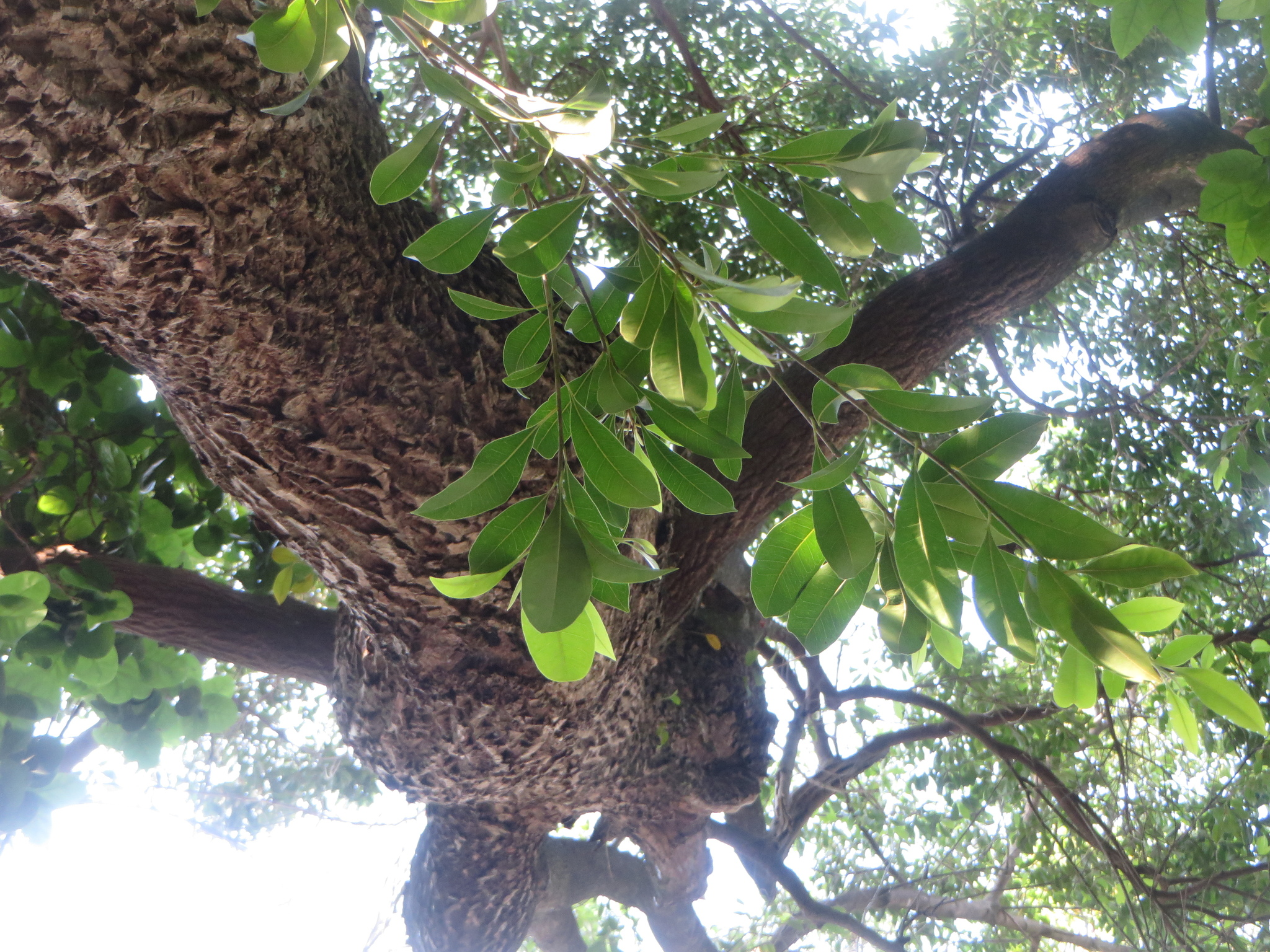
- In Florida

Conservation status
- Least Concern (IUCN 3.1)

- Secure (NatureServe)

Scientific classification
- Kingdom: Plantae
- Clade: Tracheophytes
- Clade: Angiosperms
- Clade: Eudicots
- Clade: Asterids
- Order: Ericales
- Family: Sapotaceae
- Genus: Sideroxylon
- Species: S. salicifolium

Binomial name
- Sideroxylon salicifolium (L.) Lam.

Synonyms
- Dipholis salicifolia (L.) A.DC.; Bumelia salicifolia; Achras salicifolia

= Sideroxylon salicifolium =

Species of tree

Sideroxylon salicifolium, commonly called white bully or willow bustic, is a species of flowering plant native to Florida, the West Indies and Central America.

== Taxonomy ==
It has also been considered a member of the genus Dipholis, with the binomial Dipholis salicifolia.

== Description ==
It is a small tree, 10–20 m tall, with smooth beige bark, spirally arranged leaves and small (1–4 mm) cream-coloured flowers borne in clusters of five to 12. The fruit is a small berry (6–10 mm long) with between one and three seeds. As it ripens, the fruit turns from green to reddish brown and then to dark brown when it is mature.
