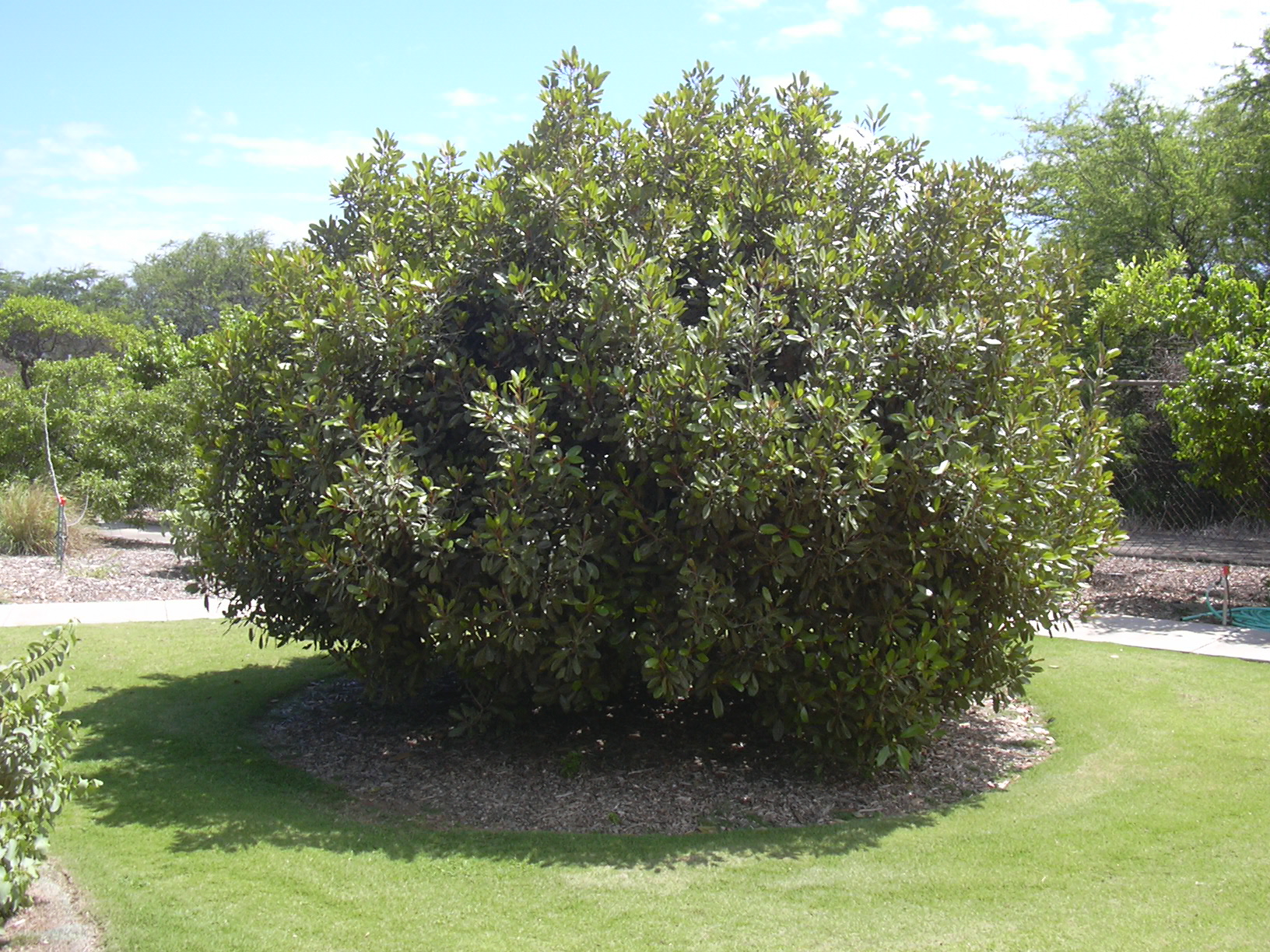

Conservation status
- Vulnerable (IUCN 2.3)

Scientific classification
- Kingdom: Plantae
- Clade: Tracheophytes
- Clade: Angiosperms
- Clade: Eudicots
- Clade: Asterids
- Order: Ericales
- Family: Sapotaceae
- Genus: Sideroxylon
- Species: S. polynesicum

Binomial name
- Sideroxylon polynesicum (Hillebr.) Smedmark & Anderb.

Synonyms
- Chrysophyllum polynesicum Hillebr.; Isonandra polynesica (Hillebr.) Benth. & Hook.f. ex Drake; Nesoluma polynesicum (Hillebr.) Baill.

= Sideroxylon polynesicum =

Species of tree

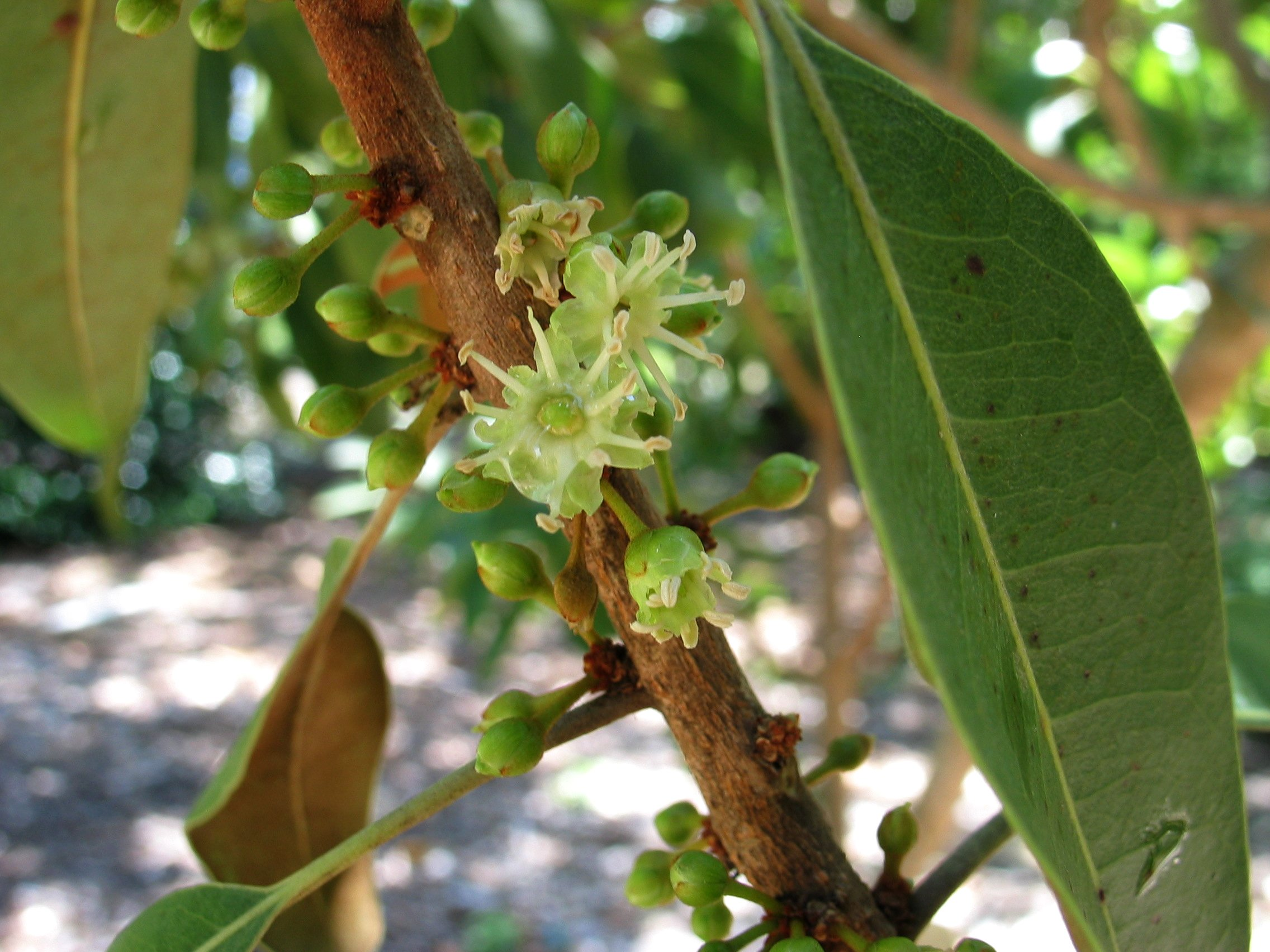
The fruit is inedible and very sticky

Sideroxylon polynesicum, the keahi or island nesoluma, is a species of flowering plant in the family Sapotaceae. It is found in the Cook (New Zealand), Tubuai (French Polynesia), and Hawaiian Islands (United States). It is threatened by habitat loss.

== Taxonomy ==
This species was first described as Chrysophyllum polynesicum by William Hillebrand in 1888, two years after his demise. Then Henri Ernest Baillon transferred it to the genus Nesoluma, all of whose constituent species were later incorporated into the genus Sideroxylon as a result of phylogenetic analyses.
