= Sideroxylon majus =

Scientific classification
- Kingdom: Plantae
- Clade: Tracheophytes
- Clade: Angiosperms
- Clade: Eudicots
- Clade: Asterids
- Order: Ericales
- Family: Sapotaceae
- Genus: Sideroxylon
- Species: S. majus

Binomial name
- Sideroxylon majus (C.F.Gaertn.) Baehni

Synonyms
- Calvaria imbricarioides (A.DC.) Dubard; Calvaria major C.F.Gaertn.; Sideroxylon imbricarioides A.DC.; Sideroxylon laurifolium Comm. ex A.DC.

Species of tree

Sideroxylon majus is a long-lived tree in the family Sapotaceae, endemic to Réunion.

== See also ==
- Sideroxylon grandiflorum, the dodo tree, a species native to Mauritius, that has been confounded with Sideroxylon majus (particularly its synonym Calvaria major)
