= Sideroxylon alachuense =

Conservation status
- Critically Imperiled (NatureServe)

Scientific classification
- Kingdom: Plantae
- Clade: Tracheophytes
- Clade: Angiosperms
- Clade: Eudicots
- Clade: Asterids
- Order: Ericales
- Family: Sapotaceae
- Genus: Sideroxylon
- Species: S. alachuense

Binomial name
- Sideroxylon alachuense L.C. Anderson

Synonyms
- Bumelia lanuginosa var. anomala Sarg; Bumelia anomala (Sarg.) R.B. Clark, not Sideroxylon anomalum (Urb.) T.D. Penn.; Bumelia lanuginosa var. anomala Sarg.; Bumelia tenax fo. anomala (Sarg.) Cronquist

Species of flowering plant

Sideroxylon alachuense, known by the common names Alachua bully, silver bully and silvery buckthorn, is a rare species of flowering plant native to the US states of Georgia and Florida. It grows in forested areas on hummocks, or near lime sinks or shell middens, at elevations of less than 200 m (650 feet).

Sideroxylon alachuense is a deciduous tree up to 10 m (33 feet) tall. Stems are armed with thorns but otherwise glabrous. Mature leaf blades are up to 70 mm (2.8 inches) long, shiny dark green above, with the underside silvery pubescent. Note: The underside of newly emergent Sideroxylon tenax leaves can have similar silvery pubescence which, however. will turn coffee-colored as they mature. White flowers are borne in bundles of up to 20 flowers. Berries are black, up to 13 mm (0.5 inches) in diameter.

The species is named for the locale where its type specimen was collected, the Alachua Sink inside Paynes Prairie Preserve State Park in Alachua County, Florida.
