= Sideroxylon dominicanum =

Conservation status
- Vulnerable (IUCN 2.3)

Scientific classification
- Kingdom: Plantae
- Clade: Tracheophytes
- Clade: Angiosperms
- Clade: Eudicots
- Clade: Asterids
- Order: Ericales
- Family: Sapotaceae
- Genus: Sideroxylon
- Species: S. dominicanum

Binomial name
- Sideroxylon dominicanum (Whetstone & T.A.Atk.) T.D.Penn.

Species of flowering plant endemic to the Dominican Republic

Sideroxylon dominicanum is a species of plant in the family Sapotaceae. It is endemic to the Dominican Republic on the Caribbean island of Hispaniola.
