= Sideroxylon eucoriaceum =

Conservation status
- Endangered (IUCN 3.1)

Scientific classification
- Kingdom: Plantae
- Clade: Tracheophytes
- Clade: Angiosperms
- Clade: Eudicots
- Clade: Asterids
- Order: Ericales
- Family: Sapotaceae
- Genus: Sideroxylon
- Species: S. eucoriaceum

Binomial name
- Sideroxylon eucoriaceum (Lundell) T.D.Penn.

Synonyms
- Bumelia eucoriacea (Lundell) Lundell; Mastichodendron eucoriaceum Lundell

Species of tree

Sideroxylon eucoriaceum is a species of flowering plant in the family Sapotaceae. It is found in Guatemala and Mexico (Southeast and Veracruz).
