= Sideroxylon peninsulare =

Conservation status
- Endangered (IUCN 3.1)

Scientific classification
- Kingdom: Plantae
- Clade: Tracheophytes
- Clade: Angiosperms
- Clade: Eudicots
- Clade: Asterids
- Order: Ericales
- Family: Sapotaceae
- Genus: Sideroxylon
- Species: S. peninsulare

Binomial name
- Sideroxylon peninsulare (Brandegee) T.D.Penn.

Species of tree

Sideroxylon peninsulare is a species of plant in the family Sapotaceae. It is endemic to two spots on the southern end of the Mexican state of Baja California Sur.
