= Sideroxylon altamiranoi =

Conservation status
- Vulnerable (IUCN 3.1)

Scientific classification
- Kingdom: Plantae
- Clade: Tracheophytes
- Clade: Angiosperms
- Clade: Eudicots
- Clade: Asterids
- Order: Ericales
- Family: Sapotaceae
- Genus: Sideroxylon
- Species: S. altamiranoi

Binomial name
- Sideroxylon altamiranoi (Rose & Standl.) T.D.Penn.

Species of tree

Sideroxylon altamiranoi is a species of plant in the family Sapotaceaey. It is endemic to two states of Mexico: Querétaro and Hidalgo.
