= Sideroxylon bullatum =

Conservation status
- Vulnerable (IUCN 2.3)

Scientific classification
- Kingdom: Plantae
- Clade: Tracheophytes
- Clade: Angiosperms
- Clade: Eudicots
- Clade: Asterids
- Order: Ericales
- Family: Sapotaceae
- Genus: Sideroxylon
- Species: S. bullatum

Binomial name
- Sideroxylon bullatum (R.A.Howard & Proctor) T.D.Penn.

Species of flowering plant

Sideroxylon bullatum is a species of plant in the family Sapotaceae. It is endemic to Jamaica. It is threatened by habitat loss.
