= Sideroxylon stevensonii =

Conservation status
- Vulnerable (IUCN 3.1)

Scientific classification
- Kingdom: Plantae
- Clade: Tracheophytes
- Clade: Angiosperms
- Clade: Eudicots
- Clade: Asterids
- Order: Ericales
- Family: Sapotaceae
- Genus: Sideroxylon
- Species: S. stevensonii

Binomial name
- Sideroxylon stevensonii (Standl.) Standl. & Steyerm.

Species of flowering plant

Sideroxylon stevensonii is a species of plant in the family Sapotaceae. It is found in Belize and Guatemala.

The faisán or pheasant zapote is a large tree of the Mopan river region of Belize. It is used primarily for lumber. Latex from this tree is used regionally as a substitute for gum. The chewy fruits are eaten by animals but unpleasant to humans as the pulp syrup binds the lips together and tongue to the roof of the mouth. It is listed on by many international agencies as an endangered species.
