= Sideroxylon nadeaudii =

Conservation status
- Critically Endangered (IUCN 3.1)

Scientific classification
- Kingdom: Plantae
- Clade: Embryophytes
- Clade: Tracheophytes
- Clade: Angiosperms
- Clade: Eudicots
- Clade: Asterids
- Order: Ericales
- Family: Sapotaceae
- Genus: Sideroxylon
- Species: S. nadeaudii

Binomial name
- Sideroxylon nadeaudii (Drake) Smedmark & Anderb.

Synonyms
- Nesoluma nadeaudii (Drake) Pierre ex H.J.Lam; Palaquium nadeaudii Drake

Species of plant

Sideroxylon nadeaudii is a species of plant in the family Sapotaceae. It is endemic to Tahiti in French Polynesia.

== Taxonomy ==
This species was first described as Palaquium nadeaudii by Emmanuel Drake del Castillo (early 1890s) and then transferred to the genus Nesoluma in 1938. As a result of the phylogenetic analyses, this species was transferred to the genus Sideroxylon in 2007.
