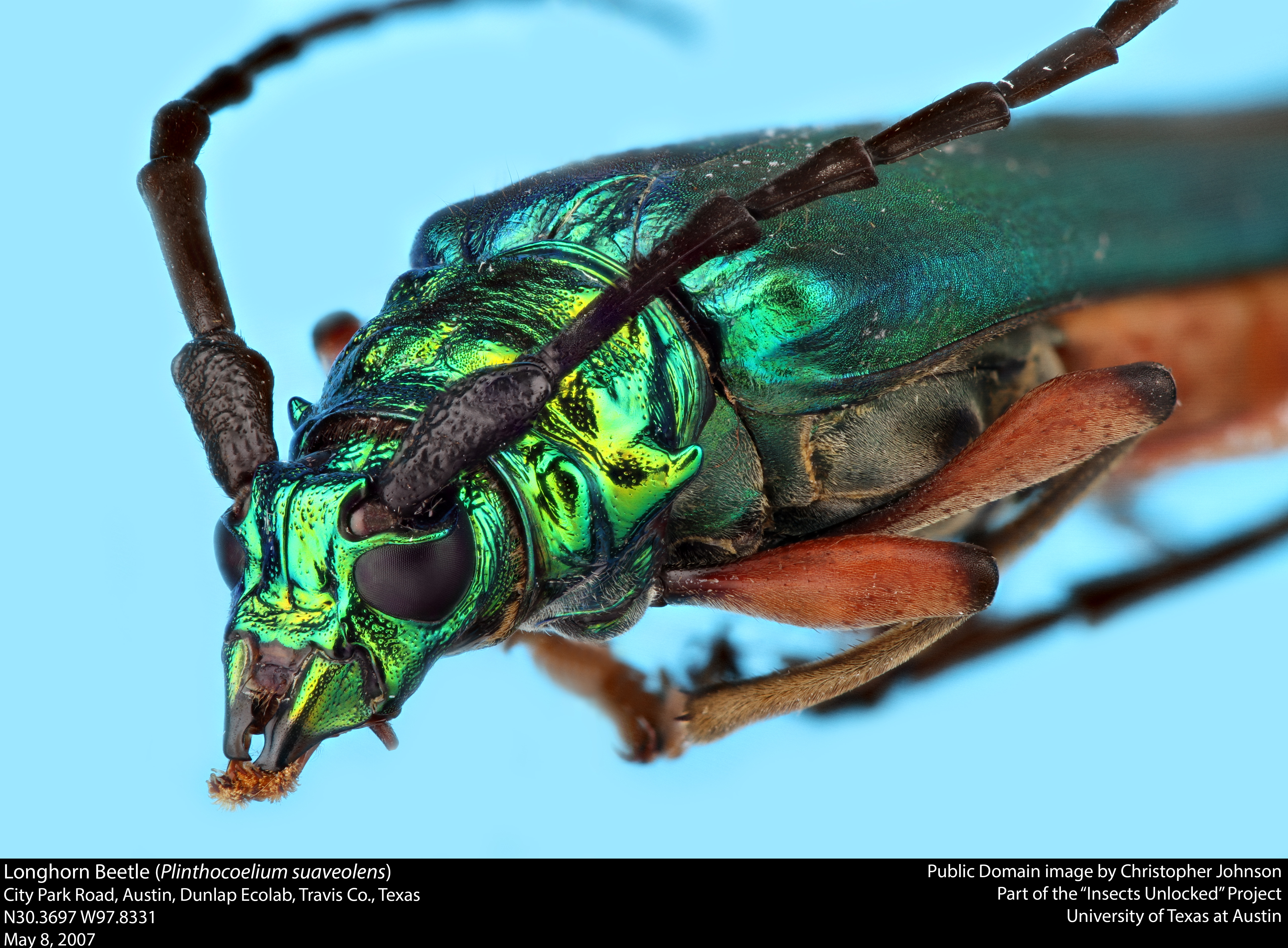

Scientific classification
- Kingdom: Animalia
- Phylum: Arthropoda
- Class: Insecta
- Order: Coleoptera
- Suborder: Polyphaga
- Infraorder: Cucujiformia
- Family: Cerambycidae
- Subfamily: Cerambycinae
- Tribe: Callichromatini
- Genus: Plinthocoelium
- Species: P. suaveolens

Binomial name
- Plinthocoelium suaveolens (Linnaeus, 1768)

Synonyms
- Callichroma elegans Haldeman, 1847; Callichroma plicatum Craighead, 1923; Callichroma splendidum White, 1853; Callichroma suaveolens Alexander, 1958; Callichroma suaveolens virescens Löding, 1945; Callichroma virescens Leng, 1886; Cerambyx suaveolens Linnaeus, 1768; Plinthocoelium elegans (Haldeman, 1847); Plinthocoelium splendidum (LeConte, 1850); Plinthocoelium suaveolens suaveolens MacRae & Rice, 2007; Plinthocoelium virescens (Leng, 1886)

= Plinthocoelium suaveolens =

Species of beetle

Plinthocoelium suaveolens, known generally as the bumelia borer, is a species of typical longhorn beetle in the family Cerambycidae. It is found in North and Central America.

== Subspecies ==
These two subspecies belong to the species Plinthocoelium suaveolens:

- Plinthocoelium suaveolens plicatum (LeConte, 1853)
- Plinthocoelium suaveolens suaveolens (Linnaeus, 1768)
