= Plinthocoelium virens =

Scientific classification
- Domain: Eukaryota
- Kingdom: Animalia
- Phylum: Arthropoda
- Class: Insecta
- Order: Coleoptera
- Suborder: Polyphaga
- Infraorder: Cucujiformia
- Family: Cerambycidae
- Genus: Plinthocoelium
- Species: P. virens

Binomial name
- Plinthocoelium virens (Drury, 1770)

Synonyms
- Plinthocoelium columbinum (Guérin-Méneville, 1838)

Species of beetle

Plinthocoelium virens is a species of beetle in the family Cerambycidae. It was described by Dru Drury in 1770.
