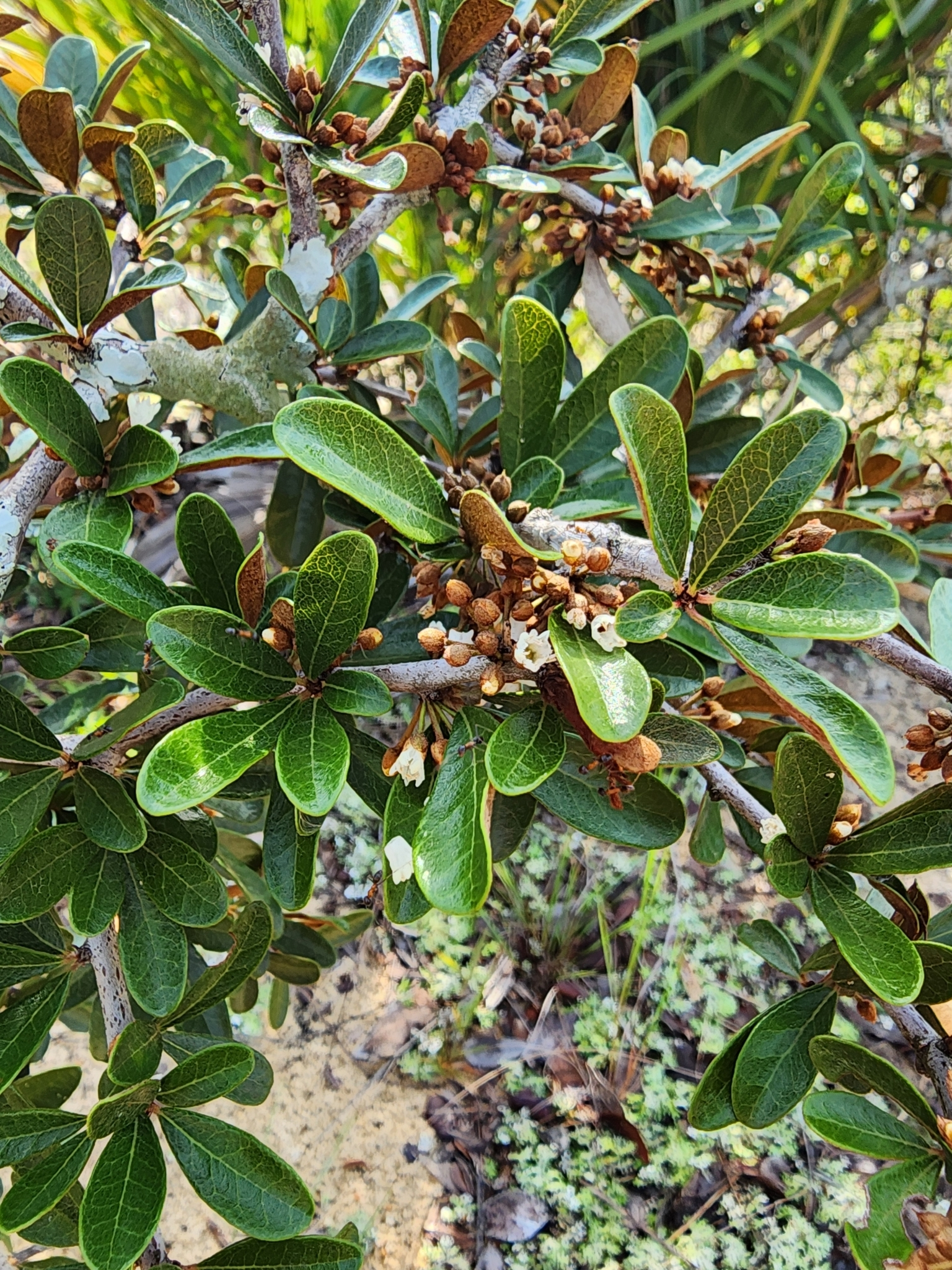

Conservation status
- Vulnerable (NatureServe)

Scientific classification
- Kingdom: Plantae
- Clade: Tracheophytes
- Clade: Angiosperms
- Clade: Eudicots
- Clade: Asterids
- Order: Ericales
- Family: Sapotaceae
- Genus: Sideroxylon
- Species: S. tenax

Binomial name
- Sideroxylon tenax L. 1767
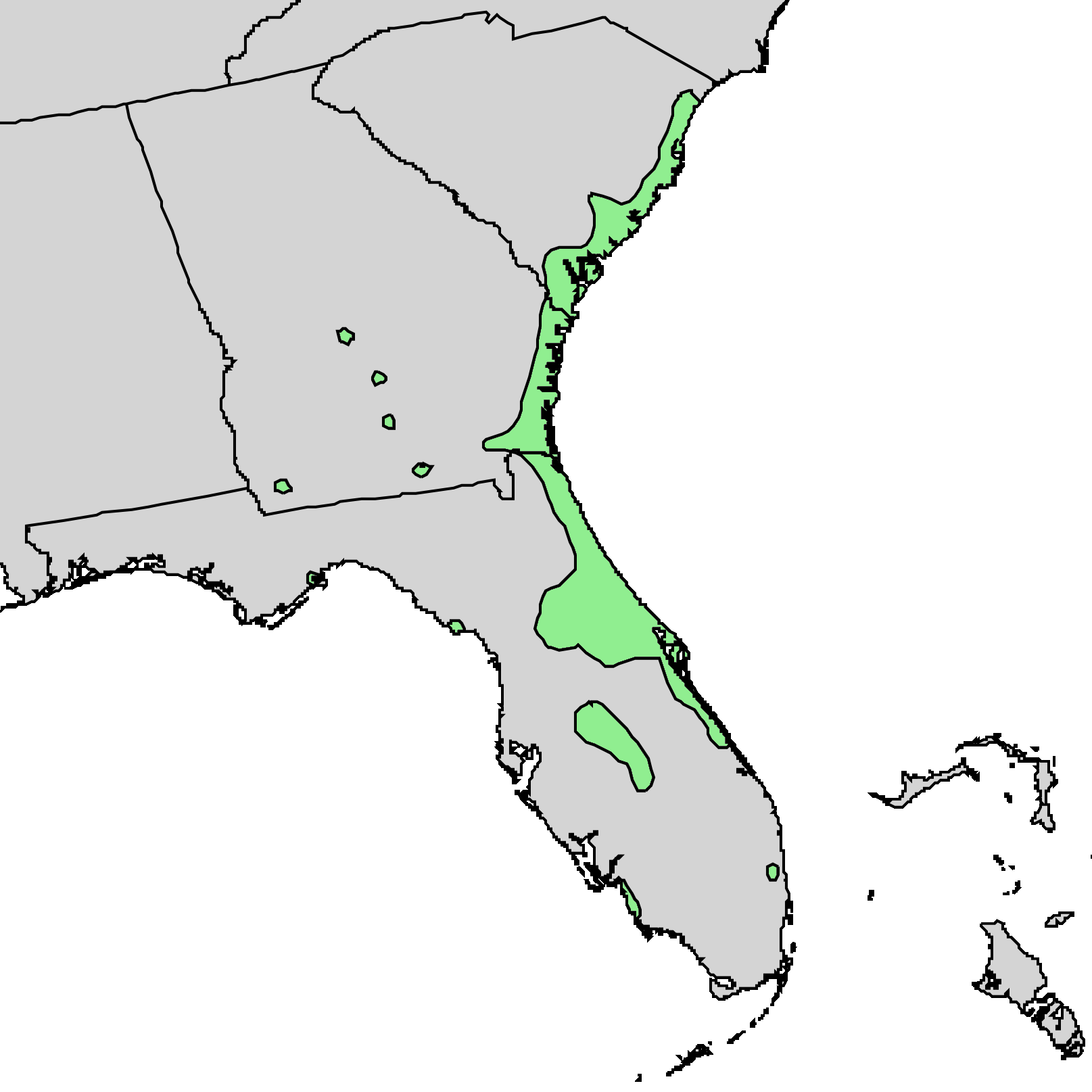

Synonyms
- Synonymy: Bumelia chrysophylloides (Michx.) P.Watson; Bumelia chrysophylloides (Michx.) Pursh; Bumelia lacuum Small; Bumelia megacocca Small; Bumelia tenax (L.) Willd.; Chrysophyllum carolinense Jacq.; Chrysophyllum glabrum Juss. ex Lam.; Lyciodes tenax (L.) Kuntze; Sclerocladus tenax (L.) Raf.; Sclerozus tenax (L.) Raf.; Sideroxylon carolinense (Jacq.) Sarg.; Sideroxylon chrysophylloides Michx.; Sideroxylon sericeum Walter

= Sideroxylon tenax =

Tough bully

Species of flowering plant

Sideroxylon tenax, called the tough bully, is a plant species native to Florida, Georgia, South Carolina and the southernmost part of North Carolina. It grows on dry, sandy soil in pine forests, pine-oak woodlands, and hummocks at elevations less than 100 m.

Sideroxylon tenax is a shrub or tree up to 8 m (almost 27 feet) tall. Stems are armed with thorns. Leaves are up to 7 cm (2.8 inches) long, upper side green and sometimes shiny, underside covered with a layer of brown hairs. Flowers are white, up to 5 mm (0.2 inches) across, borne in groups of up to 40 flowers. Berries are very dark purple, almost black, spherical to egg-shaped, about 10 mm (0.4 inches) across.

== Gallery ==
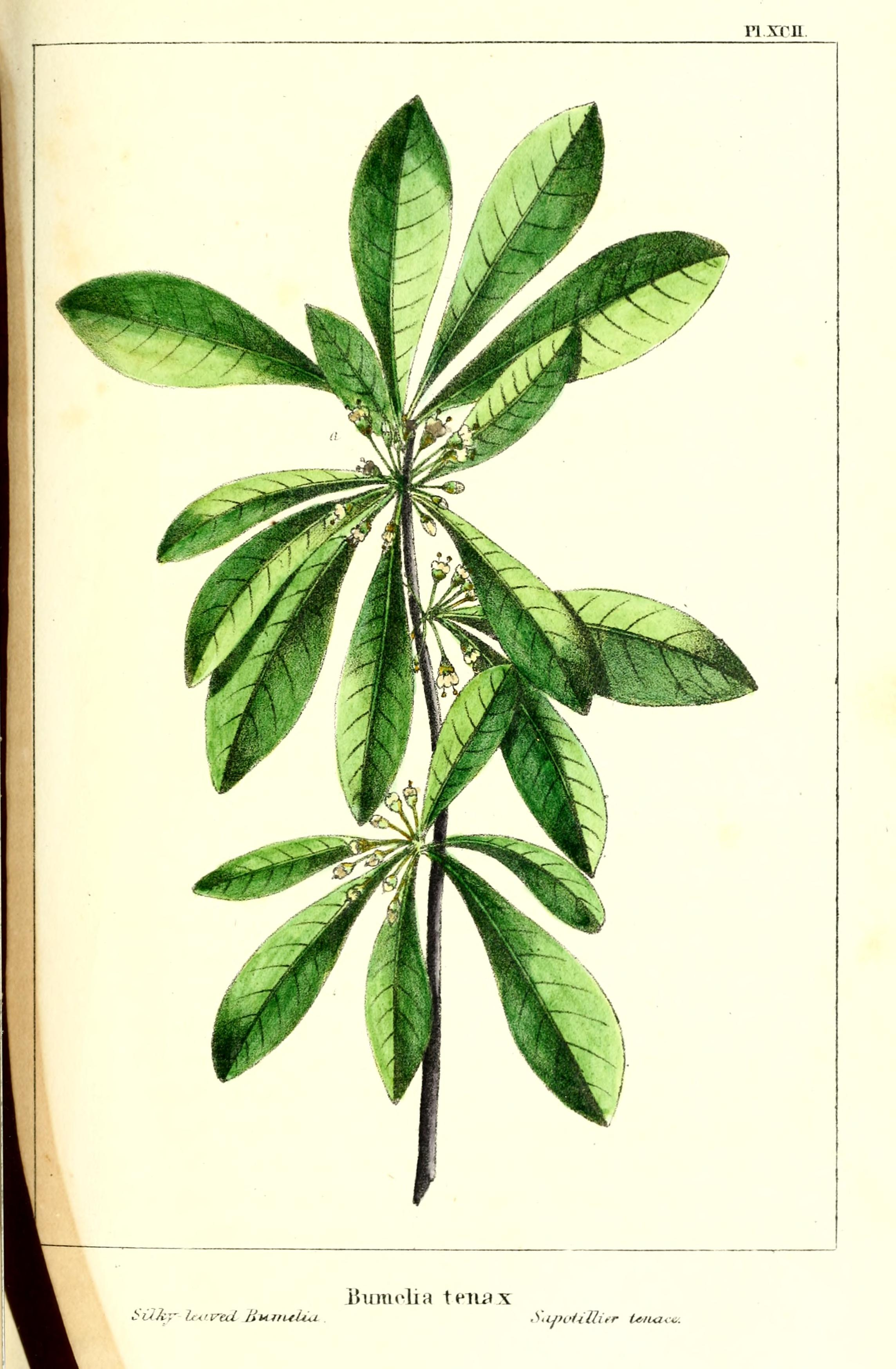
Illustration of Sideroxylon tenax with the synonym Bumelia tenax
