= Haw Branch (Daviess County) =

Stream in Missouri, United States

Coordinates: 39.8569536°N 93.8796637°W

Haw Branch is a stream in Daviess County in the U.S. state of Missouri.

Haw Branch most likely was named for the black haw timber along its course.

== See also ==
- List of rivers of Missouri
