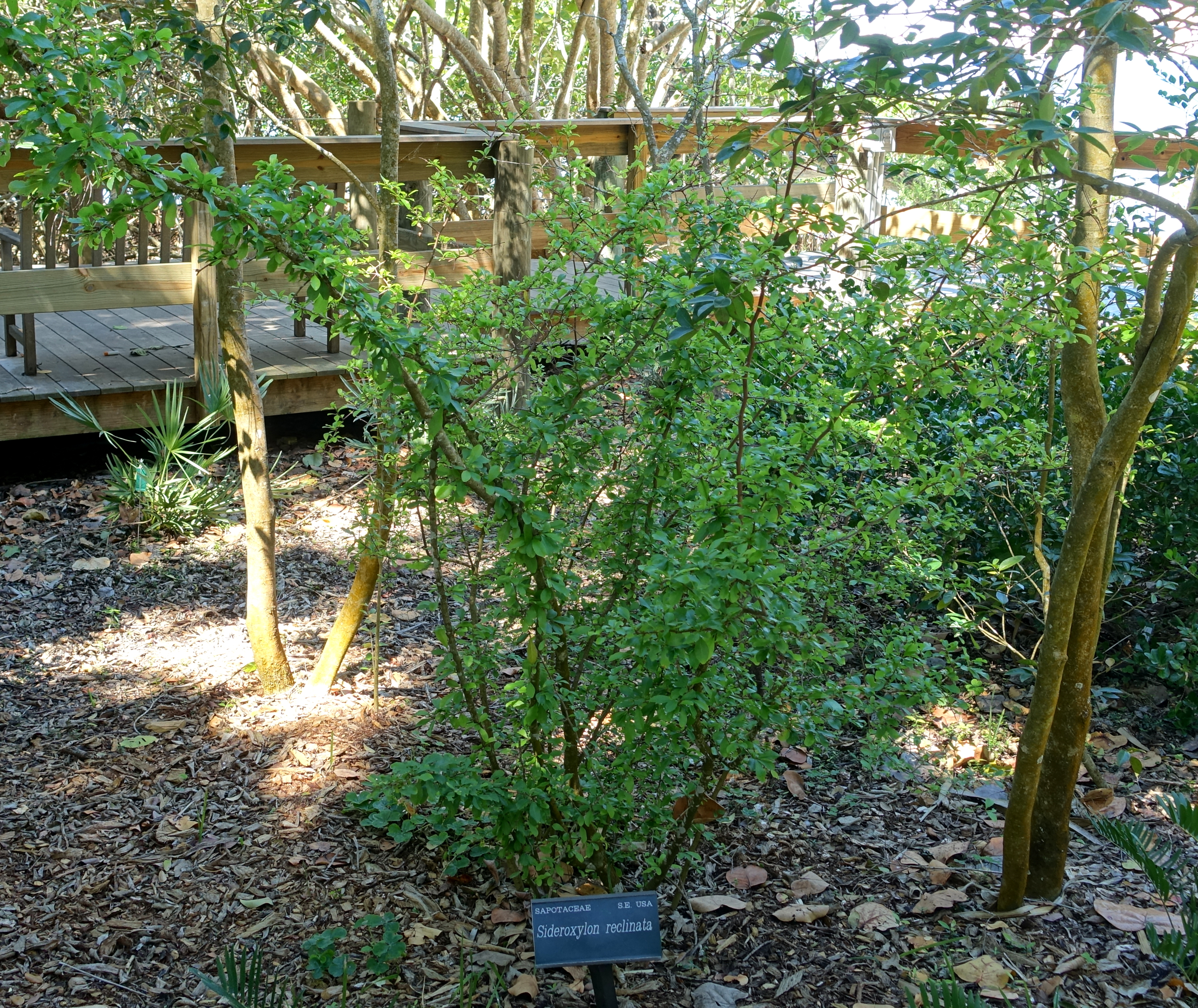

Conservation status
- Apparently Secure (NatureServe)

Scientific classification
- Kingdom: Plantae
- Clade: Tracheophytes
- Clade: Angiosperms
- Clade: Eudicots
- Clade: Asterids
- Order: Ericales
- Family: Sapotaceae
- Genus: Sideroxylon
- Species: S. reclinatum

Binomial name
- Sideroxylon reclinatum Michx.

= Sideroxylon reclinatum =

Florida bully

Species of tree

Sideroxylon reclinatum, the Florida bully, is a small tree in the family Sapotaceae. It occurs locally in the southeastern United States.

Subspecies

- Sideroxylon subsp. austrofloridense
- Sideroxylon subsp. reclinatum
- Sideroxylon subsp. rufotomentosum
