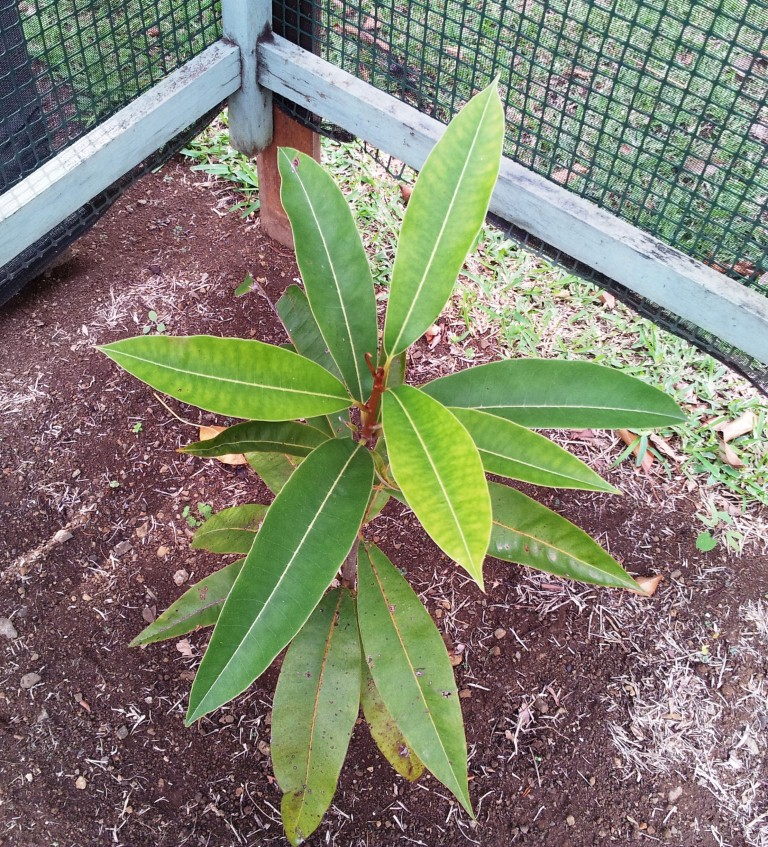
- Young tree

Scientific classification
- Kingdom: Plantae
- Clade: Embryophytes
- Clade: Tracheophytes
- Clade: Angiosperms
- Clade: Eudicots
- Clade: Asterids
- Order: Ericales
- Family: Sapotaceae
- Genus: Sideroxylon
- Species: S. grandiflorum

Binomial name
- Sideroxylon grandiflorum A.DC.

Synonyms
- Calvaria grandiflora (A.DC.) Dubard; Sapota lessertii A.DC.; Sideroxylon annithomae Aubrév.; Sideroxylon lessertii (A.DC.) Baker; Calvaria major

= Sideroxylon grandiflorum =

Species of tree

Sideroxylon grandiflorum, also known as the tambalacoque or dodo tree, is a long-lived species of tree in the sapote family Sapotaceae. It is endemic to Mauritius.

== Description ==
The fruit of Sideroxylon grandiflorum is analogous to a peach. Each is termed a drupe because each has a hard endocarp, or pit, surrounding the seed. The plant itself superficially resembles the unrelated Plumeria, but the dodo tree's flowers and fruit are cauliflorous.

== Ecology ==
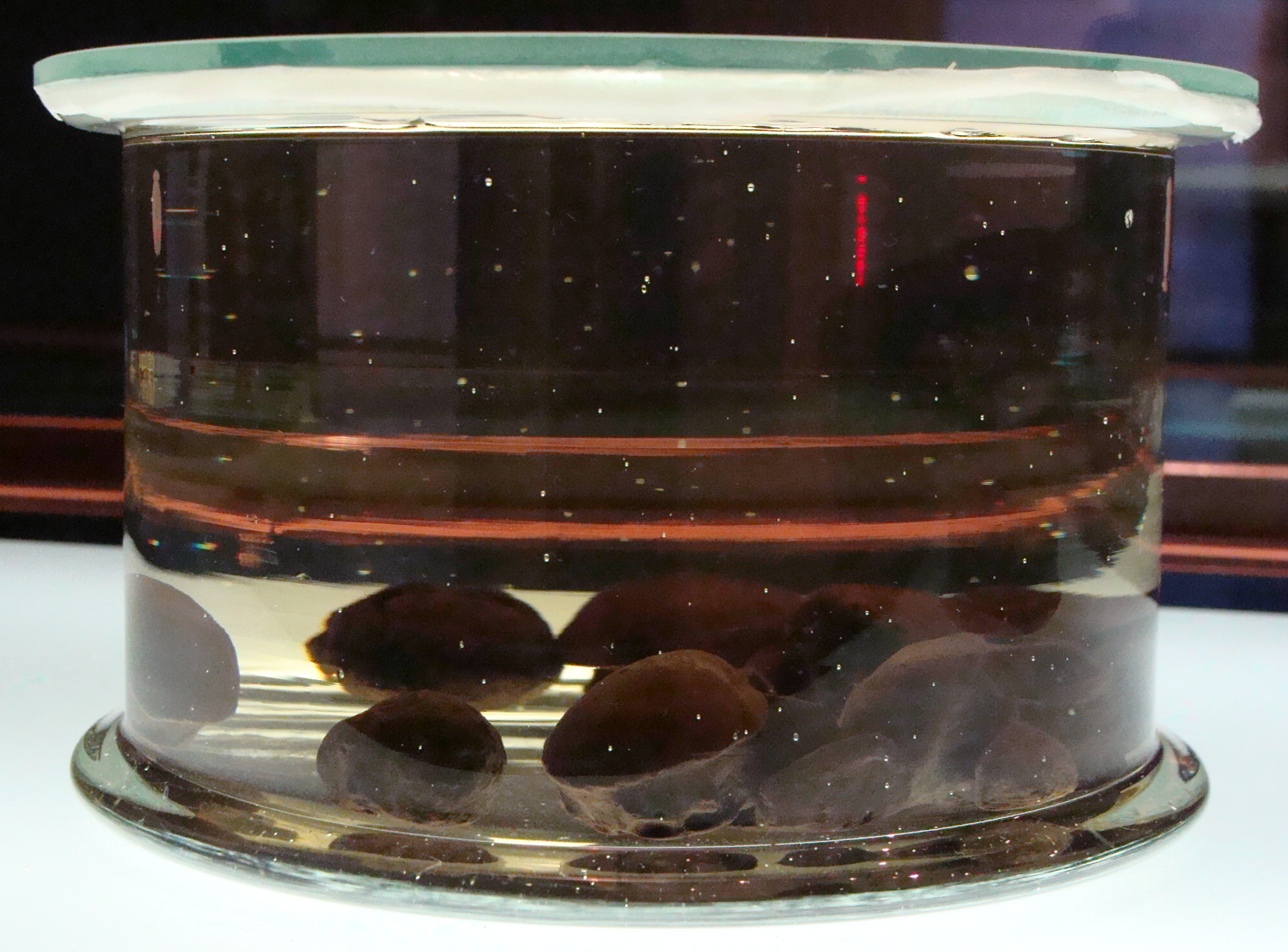
Preserved seeds, Naturalis

In 1973, it was argued that the species was becoming extinct. There were supposedly only 13 specimens left, all estimated to be about 300 years old; the true age could not be determined because tambalacoque has no growth rings. Stanley Temple hypothesised that the dodo, which became extinct in the 17th century, ate tambalacoque fruits, and that only after passing through the digestive tract of the dodo could the seeds germinate. Temple force-fed seventeen tambalacoque fruits to wild turkeys in 1977. Seven of the fruits were crushed by the bird's gizzard, while the remaining ten were either regurgitated or passed with the bird's feces. Temple planted the remaining ten fruits, three of which germinated. Temple did not try to germinate any seeds from control fruits that had not been fed to turkeys so the effect on germination of feeding fruits to turkeys was unknown. Studies on tambalacoque seed germination by Hill (1941) and King (1946) found that the seeds germinated without abrading.

Temple's hypothesis that the tree required the dodo was contested. Others have suggested that the decline of the tree was exaggerated or that other extinct animals, such as giant tortoises, fruit bats, or the broad-billed parrot, may also have been distributing the seeds. The decline of the tree may be due to introduction of domestic pigs and crab-eating macaques, and competition from introduced plants. Alternatively, the difference in reported tree numbers may arise from the fact that young trees are not distinct in appearance and may easily be confused with similar species. Catling (2001) in a summary cites Owadally and Temple (1979) and Witmer (1991), while Hershey (2004) reviewed the flaws in Temple's dodo-tambalacoque hypothesis.

In 2004, the Botanical Society of America's Plant Science Bulletin disputed Temple's research as flawed. The Bulletin published evidence as to why the dodo's extinction did not directly cause the increasing disappearance of young trees, including suggestions that the Cylindraspis giant tortoises would have been more likely to disperse the seeds than dodos, casting doubt on Temple's view as to the dodo and the tree's sole survival relationship. More recently, the tree’s decline within native forests was shown to be in fact driven by invasive introduced species: The tree’s first germination in its native habitat were observed in 2001 (26 seedlings) exclusively where invasive alien weeds had been cleared and further observations and controlled experiments showed that invasive introduced macaques (Macaca fascicularis, Rafles 1821) pick most of the tree’s fruits when still unripe, killing the seeds, and reducing natural germination rates by up to about 40 times.

== Uses ==
The dodo tree is highly valued for its wood in Mauritius, which has led some foresters to scrape the pits by hand to make them sprout and grow.

== See also ==
- Sideroxylon majus, a species native to Réunion, that has been confounded with Sideroxylon grandiflorum (particularly under its synonym Calvaria major)
