= Sideroxylon excavatum =

Conservation status
- Vulnerable (IUCN 3.1)

Scientific classification
- Kingdom: Plantae
- Clade: Tracheophytes
- Clade: Angiosperms
- Clade: Eudicots
- Clade: Asterids
- Order: Ericales
- Family: Sapotaceae
- Genus: Sideroxylon
- Species: S. excavatum

Binomial name
- Sideroxylon excavatum T.D.Penn.

Species of flowering plant

Sideroxylon excavatum is a species of plant in the family Sapotaceae. It is endemic to Guerrero and Oaxaca states in Mexico.
