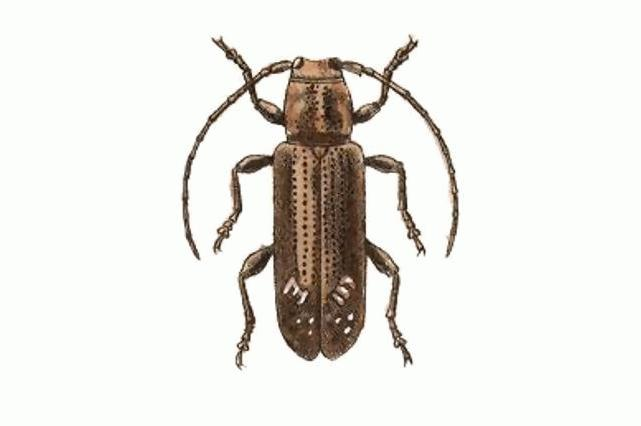

Scientific classification
- Domain: Eukaryota
- Kingdom: Animalia
- Phylum: Arthropoda
- Class: Insecta
- Order: Coleoptera
- Suborder: Polyphaga
- Infraorder: Cucujiformia
- Family: Cerambycidae
- Genus: Plinthocoelium
- Species: P. xanthogastrum

Binomial name
- Plinthocoelium xanthogastrum (Bates, 1880)

= Plinthocoelium xanthogastrum =

Species of beetle

Plinthocoelium xanthogastrum is a species of beetle in the family Cerambycidae. It was described by Bates in 1880.
