= Plinthocoelium chilense =

Scientific classification
- Domain: Eukaryota
- Kingdom: Animalia
- Phylum: Arthropoda
- Class: Insecta
- Order: Coleoptera
- Suborder: Polyphaga
- Infraorder: Cucujiformia
- Family: Cerambycidae
- Genus: Plinthocoelium
- Species: P. chilense

Binomial name
- Plinthocoelium chilense (Blanchard, 1851)

Synonyms
- Callichroma chilensis Blanchard, 1851; Plinthocoelium sapphirum (Bates, 1879)

Species of beetle

Plinthocoelium chilense is a species of beetle in the family Cerambycidae. It was described by Émile Blanchard in 1851.
