= Sideroxylon contrerasii =

Conservation status
- Near Threatened (IUCN 3.1)

Scientific classification
- Kingdom: Plantae
- Clade: Tracheophytes
- Clade: Angiosperms
- Clade: Eudicots
- Clade: Asterids
- Order: Ericales
- Family: Sapotaceae
- Genus: Sideroxylon
- Species: S. contrerasii

Binomial name
- Sideroxylon contrerasii (Lundell) T.D.Penn.

Synonyms
- Homotypic Synonyms: Bumelia contrerasii Lundell; Dipholis contrerasii (Lundell) Lundell; Heterotypic Synonyms: Pouteria odorata Lundell

Species of tree

Sideroxylon contrerasii is a species of flowering plant in the family Sapotaceae. It is native to Costa Rica, Guatemala, Honduras, Mexico (Central, Northeast, Southeast, Southwest, and Veracruz), Nicaragua, and Panama.
