= Sideroxylon cartilagineum =

Conservation status
- Near Threatened (IUCN 3.1)

Scientific classification
- Kingdom: Plantae
- Clade: Tracheophytes
- Clade: Angiosperms
- Clade: Eudicots
- Clade: Asterids
- Order: Ericales
- Family: Sapotaceae
- Genus: Sideroxylon
- Species: S. cartilagineum

Binomial name
- Sideroxylon cartilagineum (Cronquist) T.D.Penn.

Synonyms
- Bumelia cartilaginea Cronquist

Species of tree

Sideroxylon cartilagineum is a species of plant in the family Sapotaceae. It is endemic to Mexico.
