= Sideroxylon hirtiantherum =

Conservation status
- Critically Endangered (IUCN 3.1)

Scientific classification
- Kingdom: Plantae
- Clade: Tracheophytes
- Clade: Angiosperms
- Clade: Eudicots
- Clade: Asterids
- Order: Ericales
- Family: Sapotaceae
- Genus: Sideroxylon
- Species: S. hirtiantherum

Binomial name
- Sideroxylon hirtiantherum T.D.Penn.

Species of flowering plant

Sideroxylon hirtiantherum is a species of plant in the family Sapotaceae. It is endemic to Guatemala.
