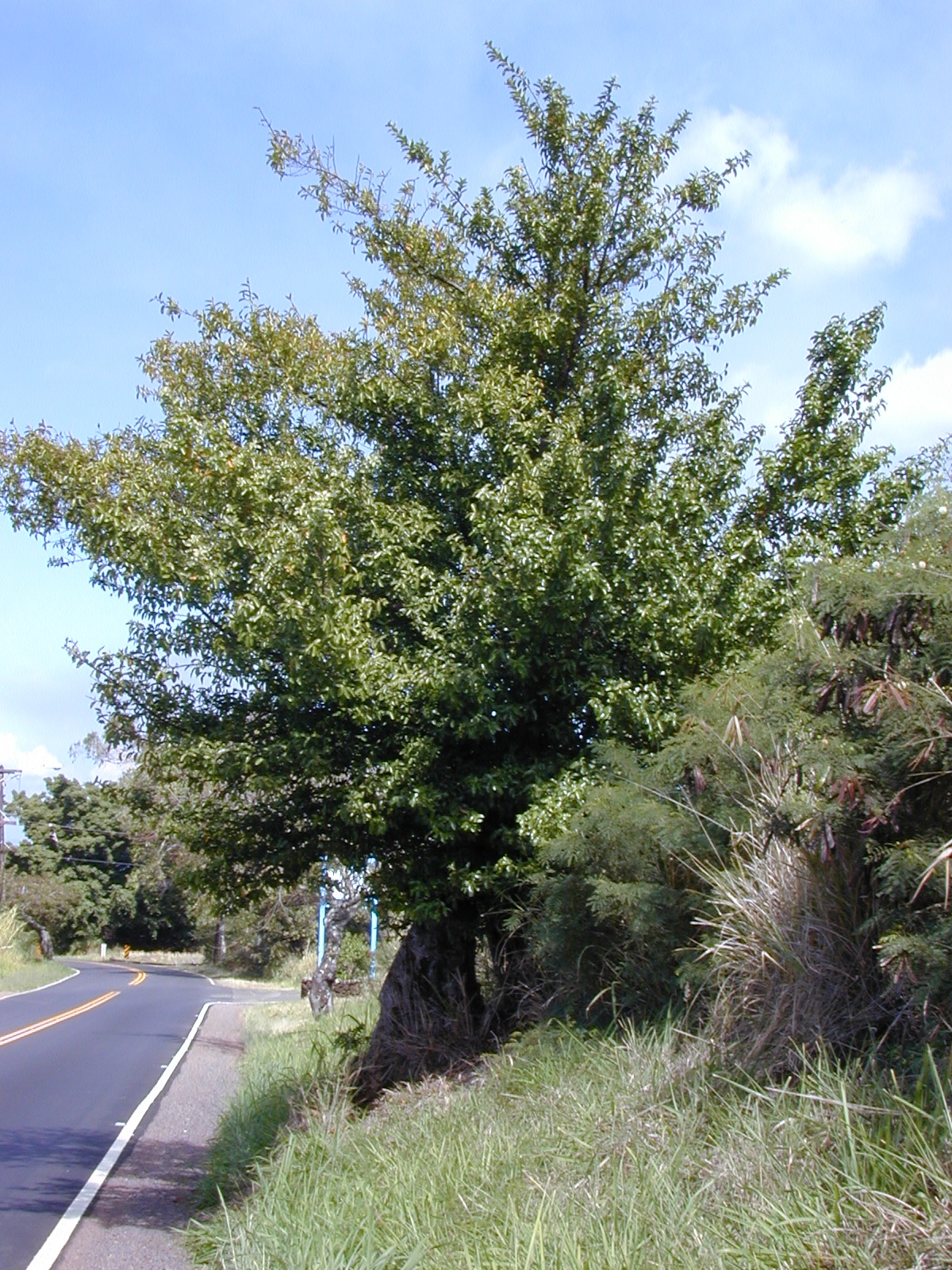
- Sideroxylon persimile

Scientific classification
- Kingdom: Plantae
- Clade: Tracheophytes
- Clade: Angiosperms
- Clade: Eudicots
- Clade: Asterids
- Order: Ericales
- Family: Sapotaceae
- Subfamily: Sapotoideae
- Genus: Sideroxylon; L.

Type species
- Sideroxylon inerme L.

Synonyms
- Apterygia Baehni; Argan Dryand.; Argania Roem. & Schult.; Bumelia Sw.; Calvaria Comm. ex C.F.Gaertn.; Cryptogyne Hook.f.; Decateles Raf.; Dipholis A.DC.; Edgeworthia Falc. 1842, illegitimate homonym, not Meisn. 1841 (Thymelaeaceae); Lyciodes Kuntze; Mastichodendron (Engl.) H.J.Lam; Monotheca A.DC.; Nesoluma Baill.; Reptonia A.DC.; Robertia Scop., rejected name; Robertsia Endl.; Rostellaria C.F.Gaertn.; Sarcorhyna C.Presl; Sclerocladus Raf.; Sinosideroxylon (Engl.) Aubrév.; Spondogona Raf., rejected name; Tatina Raf.; Verlangia Neck. ex Raf.

= Sideroxylon =

Bully trees

Genus of trees

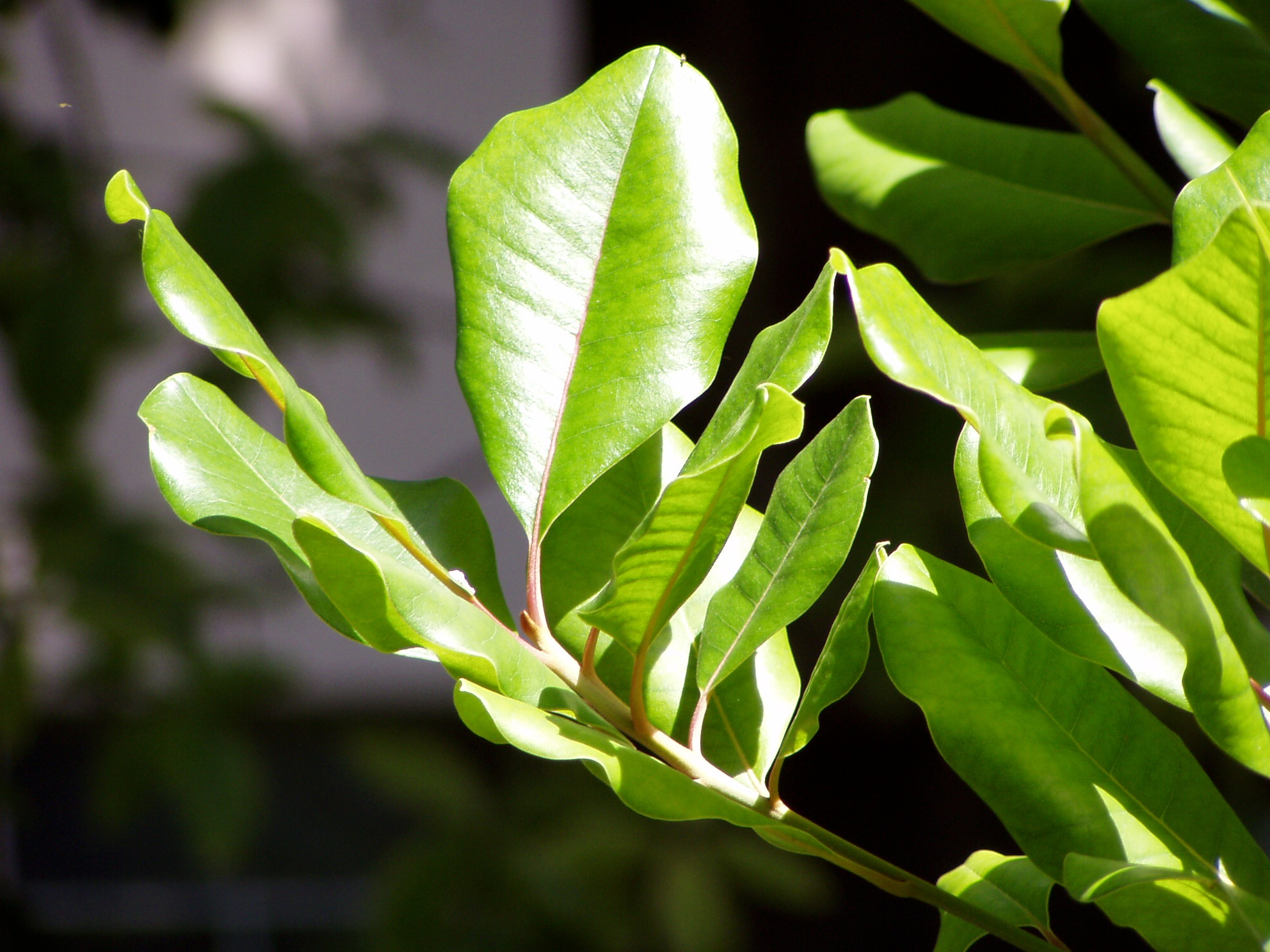
Leaves of Sideroxylon mirmulano

Sideroxylon is a genus of trees in the family Sapotaceae described as a genus by Linnaeus in 1753. They are collectively known as bully trees. The generic name is derived from the Greek words σιδηρος (sideros), meaning "iron", and ξύλον (xylon), meaning "wood."

== Distribution ==
The genus is distributed mainly in North and South America as well as in Africa, Madagascar, southern Asia, and various oceanic islands. Some species, such as gum bully (S. lanuginosum), S. tenax, and buckthorn bully (S. lycioides), are found in subtropical areas of North America. The only South African species, the white milkwood (S. inerme), is associated with three historical sites, and these individuals were declared national monuments due to their unusual longevity.

== Ecology ==
Several species have become rare due to logging and other forms of habitat destruction. The tambalacoque (S. grandiflorum) of Mauritius was affected by the extinction of the birds which dispersed its seed; it was suggested that the species entirely depended on the dodo (Raphus cucullatus) for that purpose and nearly became a victim of coextinction, but this is not correct. Bully trees provide food for the larvae of certain Lepidoptera, such as the bumelia webworm moth (Urodus parvula) as well as several species of Coleoptera of the genus Plinthocoelium, commonly known as bumelia borers.

== Species ==
83 species are currently accepted.

- Sideroxylon acunae (Borhidi) T.D.Penn. - Cuba
- Sideroxylon alachuense L.C.Anderson - United States (Florida)
- Sideroxylon altamiranoi (Rose & Standl.) T.D.Penn. - Mexico (Hidalgo, Querétaro)
- Sideroxylon americanum (Mill.) T.D.Penn. - Mexico (Yucatán Peninsula), West Indies
- Sideroxylon anomalum (Urb.) T.D.Penn. - Hispaniola (Barahona Province, Dominican Republic)
- Sideroxylon beguei Capuron ex Aubrév. - Madagascar
- Sideroxylon bequaertii De Wild. - Democratic Republic of the Congo
- Sideroxylon betsimisarakum Lecomte - Madagascar
- Sideroxylon borbonicum A.DC. - Réunion
- Sideroxylon boutonianum A.DC. - Mauritius
- Sideroxylon brucebenzii Cuevas & A.Vázquez – Mexico (Jalisco)
- Sideroxylon bullatum (R.A.Howard & Proctor) T.D.Penn. - Jamaica
- Sideroxylon canariense Leyens, Lobin & A.Santos - Canary Islands
- Sideroxylon cantoniense Lour. - Southeast China
- Sideroxylon capiri (A.DC.) Pittier - Mesoamerica, West Indies
- Sideroxylon capuronii Aubrév. - Madagascar
- Sideroxylon cartilagineum (Cronquist) T.D.Penn. - Mexico (Sinaloa, Jalisco, Guerrero)
- Sideroxylon celastrinum (Kunth) T.D.Penn. - United States (Texas), Mesoamerica, Colombia, Venezuela, Cuba, Bahamas
- Sideroxylon cinereum Lam. - Mauritius
- Sideroxylon cochranei A.Vázquez & Santana Mich. – Mexico (Jalisco)
- Sideroxylon contrerasii (Lundell) T.D.Penn. - Mesoamerica
- Sideroxylon cubense (Griseb.) T.D.Penn. - West Indies
- Sideroxylon dominicanum (Whetstone & T.A.Atk.) T.D.Penn. - Hispaniola (Dominican Republic)
- Sideroxylon durifolium (Standl.) T.D.Penn. - Mexico (Chiapas), Belize
- Sideroxylon ekmanianum (Urb.) Bisse, J.E.Gut. & Iglesias - Cuba
- Sideroxylon eriocarpum (Greenm. & Conz.) T.D.Penn. - Mexico (Oaxaca)
- Sideroxylon eucoriaceum (Lundell) T.D.Penn. - Mexico (Veracruz), Guatemala
- Sideroxylon eucuneifolium (Lundell) T.D.Penn. - Guatemala
- Sideroxylon excavatum T.D.Penn. - Mexico (Guerrero, Oaxaca)
- Sideroxylon fimbriatum Balf.f. - Yemen (Socotra)
- Sideroxylon floribundum Griseb. - Belize, Guatemala, Jamaica
- Sideroxylon foetidissimum Jacq. - West Indies, Southern Mexico, Guatemala, Belize, United States (Florida)
- Sideroxylon galeatum (A.W.Hill) Baehni - Mauritius (Rodrigues)
- Sideroxylon gerrardianum (Hook.f.) Aubrév. - Madagascar
- Sideroxylon grandiflorum A.DC. - Mauritius
- Sideroxylon hirtiantherum T.D.Penn. - Guatemala, Honduras
- Sideroxylon horridum (Griseb.) T.D.Penn. - Cuba, Cayman Islands
- Sideroxylon ibarrae (Lundell) T.D.Penn. - Guatemala (Baja Verapaz)
- Sideroxylon inerme L. - Africa (Somalia to Cape Province, South Africa), Seychelles (Aldabra), French Southern and Antarctic Lands (Juan de Nova I)
- Sideroxylon jubilla (Ekman ex Urb.) T.D.Penn. - Cuba
- Sideroxylon lanuginosum Michx. – - United States (Arizona to South Carolina, Kentucky), northeastern Mexico
- Sideroxylon leucophyllum S.Wats. - Mexico (Baja California, Sonora)
- Sideroxylon lycioides L. – buckthorn bully - Southeastern United States (Texas to Delaware)
- Sideroxylon macrocarpum (Nutt.) J.R.Allison - United States (Georgia)
- Sideroxylon majus (Gaertn.f.) Baehni - Réunion
- Sideroxylon marginatum (Decne. Ex Webb) - Cape Verde
- Sideroxylon mascatense (A. DC.) T.D. Penn. - Ethiopia to Pakistan
- Sideroxylon mirmulano R.Br. - Madeira
- Sideroxylon moaense (Bisse & J.E.Gut.) J.E.Gut. - Cuba
- Sideroxylon montanum (Sw.) T.D.Penn. - Jamaica
- Sideroxylon nadeaudii (Drake) Smedmark & Anderb. - Tahiti
- Sideroxylon nervosum Wall. ex G.Don - Myanmar
- Sideroxylon obovatum Lam. - West Indies, Venezuela
- Sideroxylon obtusifolium (Roem. & Schult.) T.D.Penn. - Mexico (Veracruz) to Paraguay
- Sideroxylon occidentale (Hemsl.) T.D.Penn. - Mexico (Baja California, Sonora)
- Sideroxylon octosepalum (Urb.) T.D.Penn. - Jamaica (Clarendon Parish)
- Sideroxylon palmeri (Rose) T.D.Penn. - Mexico
- Sideroxylon peninsulare (Brandegee) T.D.Penn. - Mexico (Baja California)
- Sideroxylon persimile (Hemsl.) T.D.Penn. - Mesoamerica, Colombia, Venezuela, Trinidad and Tobago (Trinidad)
- Sideroxylon picardae (Urb.) T.D.Penn. - Hispaniola (Haiti, Dominican Republic)
- Sideroxylon polynesicum (Hillebr.) Smedmark & Anderb. - United States (Hawaii), French Polynesia (Rapa-Iti)
- Sideroxylon portoricense Urb. - Mesoamerica, Greater Antilles
- Sideroxylon puberulum A.DC. - Mauritius
- Sideroxylon reclinatum Michx. - United States (Louisiana, Mississippi, Alabama, Georgia, Florida, South Carolina)
- Sideroxylon repens (Urb. and Ekman) T.D.Penn. - Hispaniola (Dominican Republic)
- Sideroxylon retinerve T.D.Penn. - Honduras
- Sideroxylon rotundifolium (Sw.) T.D.Penn. - Jamaica
- Sideroxylon rubiginosum T.D.Penn. - Hispaniola (Dominican Republic)
- Sideroxylon salicifolium (L.) Lam. - West Indies, Mesoamerica, Florida
- Sideroxylon saxorum Lecomte - Madagascar
- Sideroxylon sessiliflorum (Poir.) Capuron ex Aubrév. - Mauritius
- Sideroxylon socorrense (Brandegee) T.D.Penn. - Mexico (Socorro Island)
- Sideroxylon spinosum L. - Morocco, Algeria, Mauritania, and Western Sahara
- Sideroxylon st-johnianum (H.J.Lam & B.Meeuse) Smedmark & Anderb. - Pitcairn Islands (Henderson Island)
- Sideroxylon stenospermum (Standl.) T.D.Penn. - Mesoamerica
- Sideroxylon stevensonii (Standl.) Standl. & Steyerm. - Mexico (Chiapas), Belize, Guatemala
- Sideroxylon tambolokoko Aubrév. - Madagascar
- Sideroxylon tenax L. - United States (Florida, Georgia, South Carolina, North Carolina)
- Sideroxylon tepicense (Standl.) T.D.Penn. - Mesoamerica
- Sideroxylon thornei (Cronquist) T.D.Penn. - United States (Florida, Georgia, Alabama)
- Sideroxylon verruculosum (Cronquist) T.D.Penn. - Mexico
- Sideroxylon wightianum S.Mori - China (Guizhou, Yunnan, Guangdong), Vietnam

=== Formerly placed here ===
- Micropholis acutangula (Ducke) Eyma (as S. acutangulum Ducke)
- Micropholis crassipedicellata (Mart. & Eichler ex Miq.) Pierre (as S. crassipedicellatum Mart. & Eichler ex Miq.)
- Micropholis guyanensis (A.DC.) Pierre (as S. guyanense A.DC.)
- Micropholis rugosa (Sw.) Pierre (as S. rugosum (Sw.) Roem. & Schult.)
- Olinia ventosa (L.) Cufod. (as S. cymosum L.f.)
- Planchonella australis (R.Br.) Pierre (as S. australe (R.Br.) Benth. & Hook.f. ex F.Muell.)
- Planchonella costata (Endl.) Pierre (as S. costatum (Endl.) F.Muell.)
- Planchonella eerwah (F.M.Bailey) P.Royen (as S. eerwah F.M.Bailey)
- Planchonella macrantha (Merr.) Swenson (as S. macranthum Merr.)
- Pouteria elegans (A.DC.) Baehni (as S. elegans A.DC.)
- Pouteria reticulata (Engl.) Eyma (as S. uniloculare Donn.Sm.)
- Pouteria sapota (Jacq.) H.E.Moore & Stearn (as S. sapota Jacq.)
- Synsepalum dulcificum (Schumach.) Daniell (as S. dulcificum (Schumach.) A.DC.)
