= Sideroxylon cubense =

Scientific classification
- Kingdom: Plantae
- Clade: Tracheophytes
- Clade: Angiosperms
- Clade: Eudicots
- Clade: Asterids
- Order: Ericales
- Family: Sapotaceae
- Genus: Sideroxylon
- Species: S. cubense

Binomial name
- Sideroxylon cubense (Griseb.) T.D.Penn.

Synonyms
- Bumelia conferta (C.Wright) Pierre; Bumelia cubensis Griseb.; Bumelia gymnanthifolia Bisse & J.E.Gut.; Bumelia neglecta Bisse & J.E.Gut., nom. illeg.; Dipholis angustifolia Urb.; Dipholis cubensis (Griseb.) Pierre; Dipholis domingensis Pierre & Urb.; Dipholis leptopoda Urb. & Ekman; Dipholis sintenisiana Pierre; Sideroxylon confertum C.Wright

Species of plant

Sideroxylon cubense is a species of plant in the family Sapotaceae. It is native to Cuba, Hispaniola (the Dominican Republic and Haiti), the Leeward Islands, and Puerto Rico.

== Taxonomy ==
Sideroxylon confertum was assessed as "vulnerable" in the 1998 IUCN Red List, where it was considered endemic to Cuba, but as of January 2023 was treated as a junior synonym within the more widely distributed S. cubense.
