= Sideroxylon anomalum =

Conservation status
- Vulnerable (IUCN 2.3)

Scientific classification
- Kingdom: Plantae
- Clade: Tracheophytes
- Clade: Angiosperms
- Clade: Eudicots
- Clade: Asterids
- Order: Ericales
- Family: Sapotaceae
- Genus: Sideroxylon
- Species: S. anomalum

Binomial name
- Sideroxylon anomalum (Urb.) T.D.Penn.

Species of flowering plant

Sideroxylon anomalum is a species of plant in the family Sapotaceae that is endemic to the Caribbean island of Hispaniola, in the Dominican Republic's Barahona Province.
