= Plinthocoelium schwarzi =

Scientific classification
- Domain: Eukaryota
- Kingdom: Animalia
- Phylum: Arthropoda
- Class: Insecta
- Order: Coleoptera
- Suborder: Polyphaga
- Infraorder: Cucujiformia
- Family: Cerambycidae
- Genus: Plinthocoelium
- Species: P. schwarzi

Binomial name
- Plinthocoelium schwarzi (Fisher, 1914)

Species of beetle

Plinthocoelium schwarzi is a species of beetle in the family Cerambycidae. It was described by Fisher in 1914.
