= Sideroxylon durifolium =

Conservation status
- Data Deficient (IUCN 3.1)

Scientific classification
- Kingdom: Plantae
- Clade: Tracheophytes
- Clade: Angiosperms
- Clade: Eudicots
- Clade: Asterids
- Order: Ericales
- Family: Sapotaceae
- Genus: Sideroxylon
- Species: S. durifolium

Binomial name
- Sideroxylon durifolium (Standl.) T.D.Penn.

Species of flowering plant

Sideroxylon durifolium is a species of plant in the family Sapotaceae. It is endemic to Belize.

This species is native to:

- southeastern Mexico
- Belize

No other species are listed as such.
