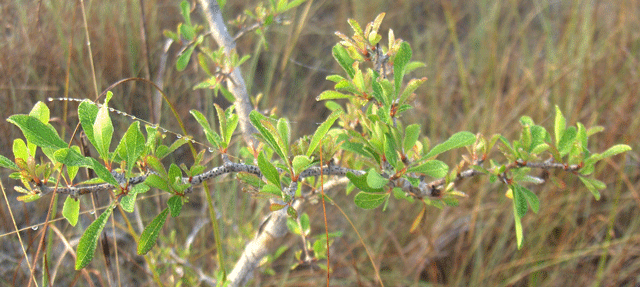

Conservation status
- Least Concern (IUCN 3.1)

Scientific classification
- Kingdom: Plantae
- Clade: Tracheophytes
- Clade: Angiosperms
- Clade: Eudicots
- Clade: Asterids
- Order: Ericales
- Family: Sapotaceae
- Genus: Sideroxylon
- Species: S. celastrinum

Binomial name
- Sideroxylon celastrinum (Kunth) T.D.Penn
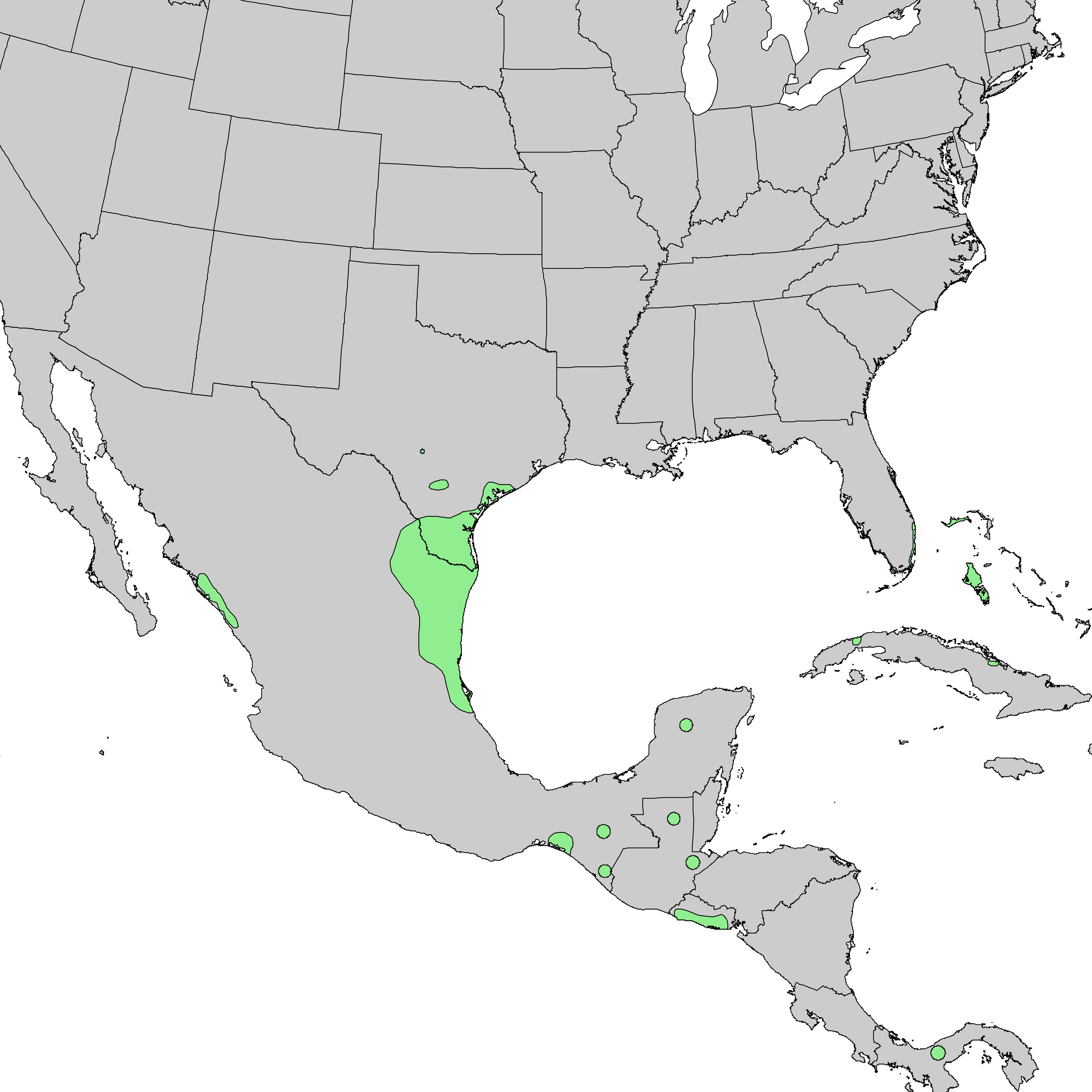
- Natural range of Sideroxylon celastrinum

Synonyms
- Bumelia angustifolia Nutt.; Bumelia celastrina Kunth; Bumelia celastrina var. angustifolia (Nutt.) R.W.Long; Bumelia spiniflora A.DC.

= Sideroxylon celastrinum =

Species of tree

Sideroxylon celastrinum is a species of flowering plant in the family Sapotaceae, that is native to Texas and Florida in the United States south through Central America to northern Venezuela and Colombia in South America. Common names include saffron plum and coma. It is a spiny shrub or small tree that reaches a height of 2–9 m (6.6–29.5 ft). The dark green leaves are alternate or fascicled at the nodes and oblanceolate to obovate. Greenish-white flowers are present from May to November and are followed by single-seeded, blue-black drupes.

== Uses ==
This plant is known as a first choice deer feed.

== Synonyms ==
- Bumelia angustifolia Nutt.
- Bumelia celastrina Kunth
- Bumelia celastrina var. angustifolia (Nutt.) R.W.Long
- Bumelia spiniflora A.DC.
