= Sideroxylon st-johnianum =

Conservation status
- Vulnerable (IUCN 3.1)

Scientific classification
- Kingdom: Plantae
- Clade: Tracheophytes
- Clade: Angiosperms
- Clade: Eudicots
- Clade: Asterids
- Order: Ericales
- Family: Sapotaceae
- Genus: Sideroxylon
- Species: S. st-johnianum

Binomial name
- Sideroxylon st-johnianum (H.J.Lam & B.Meeuse) Smedmark & Anderb.

Synonyms
- Nesoluma st-johnianum H.J.Lam & B.Meeuse

Species of plant

Sideroxylon st-johnianum is a species of flowering plant in the family Sapotaceae. It is endemic to Henderson Island, Pitcairn. Having been described first as Nesoluma st-johnianum (1938), this species was transferred to the genus Sideroxylon in 2007 as a result of the phylogenetic analyses.
