= Sideroxylon montanum =

Conservation status
- Near Threatened (IUCN 2.3)

Scientific classification
- Kingdom: Plantae
- Clade: Tracheophytes
- Clade: Angiosperms
- Clade: Eudicots
- Clade: Asterids
- Order: Ericales
- Family: Sapotaceae
- Genus: Sideroxylon
- Species: S. montanum

Binomial name
- Sideroxylon montanum (Sw.) T.D.Penn.

Species of flowering plant

Sideroxylon montanum is a species of plant in the family Sapotaceae. It is endemic to Jamaica. It is threatened by habitat loss.
