= Plinthocoelium domingoense =

Scientific classification
- Domain: Eukaryota
- Kingdom: Animalia
- Phylum: Arthropoda
- Class: Insecta
- Order: Coleoptera
- Suborder: Polyphaga
- Infraorder: Cucujiformia
- Family: Cerambycidae
- Genus: Plinthocoelium
- Species: P. domingoense

Binomial name
- Plinthocoelium domingoense (Fisher, 1922)

Synonyms
- Callichroma domingoensis Fisher, 1922

Species of beetle

Plinthocoelium domingoense is a species of beetle in the family Cerambycidae. It was described by Fisher in 1922.
