= Haw Branch (Cane Creek tributary) =

Stream in Missouri, United States

Coordinates: 36.7239443°N 90.5070587°W

Haw Branch is a stream in Butler County in the U.S. state of Missouri. It is a tributary of Cane Creek.

Haw Branch was named for the black haw in the area.

== See also ==
- List of rivers of Missouri
