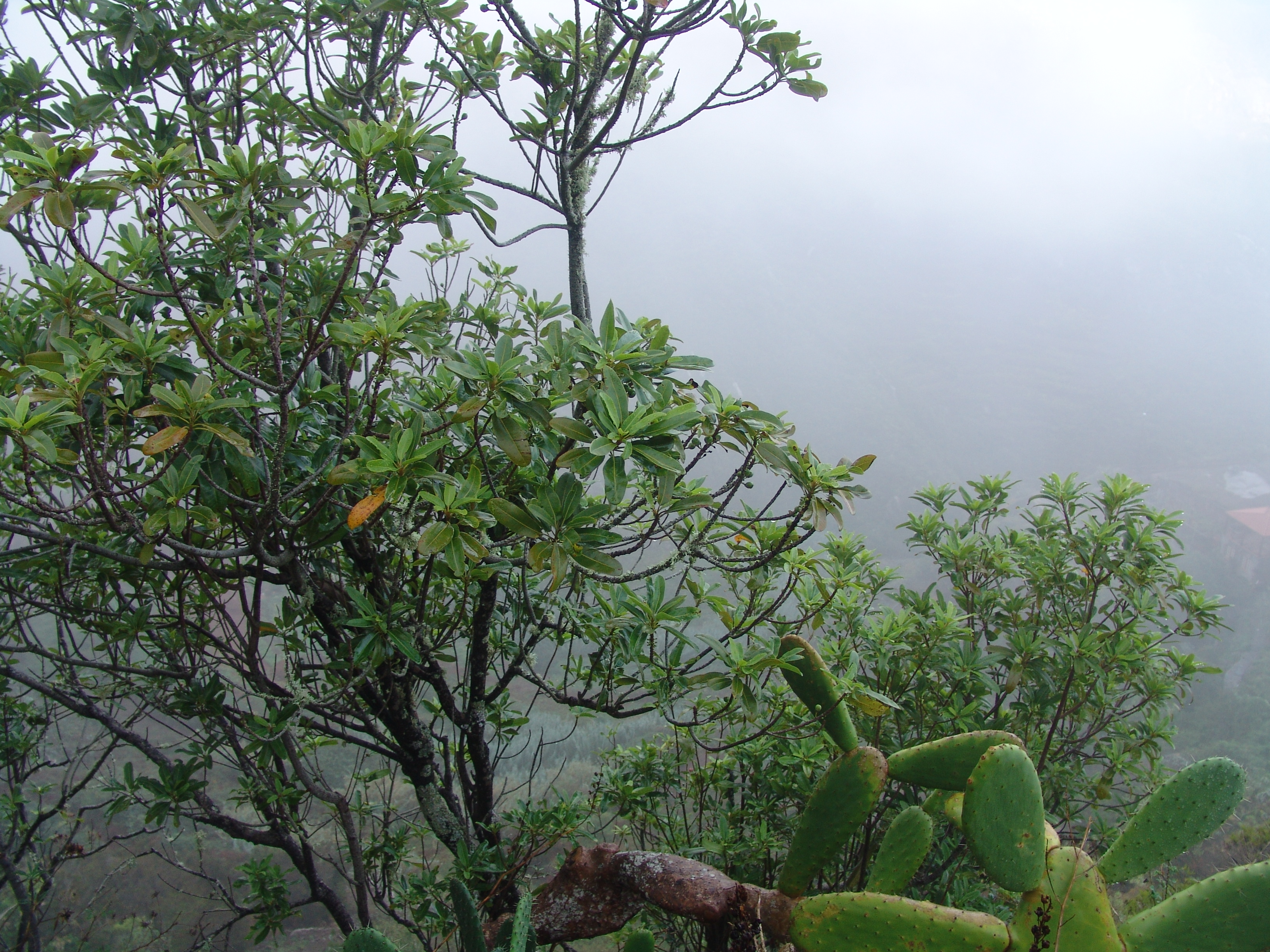

Conservation status
- Endangered (IUCN 3.1)

Scientific classification
- Kingdom: Plantae
- Clade: Tracheophytes
- Clade: Angiosperms
- Clade: Eudicots
- Clade: Asterids
- Order: Ericales
- Family: Sapotaceae
- Genus: Sideroxylon
- Species: S. canariense

Binomial name
- Sideroxylon canariense Leyens, Lobin & A.Santos.

Synonyms
- Sideroxylon mirmulano var. canariense

= Sideroxylon canariense =

Species of flowering plant

Sideroxylon canariense is a species of flowering plant in the family Sapotaceae. It It is endemic to the Canary Islands.

== Description ==
Sideroxylon canariense is an evergreen tree that grows up to 10 meters in height.

== Distribution and habitat ==
Sideroxylon canariense is found on steep slopes and ravines, and in dry laurel forests (laurisilva), between 100 and 1000 meters elevation.

== Systematics ==
It was formerly considered a subspecies (canariense) of Sideroxylon mirmulano, which is native to Madeira.
