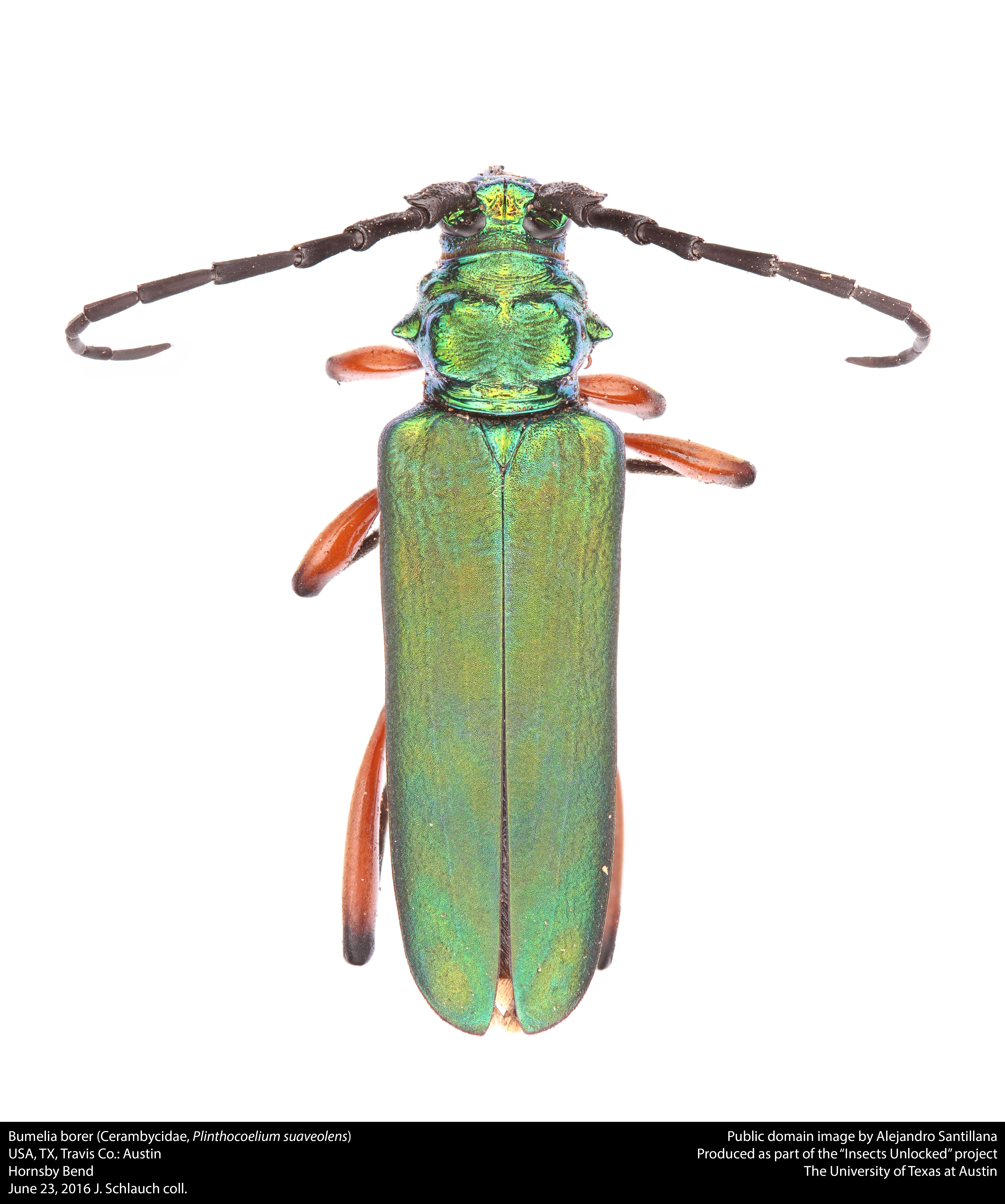
- Plinthocoelium suaveolens

Scientific classification
- Domain: Eukaryota
- Kingdom: Animalia
- Phylum: Arthropoda
- Class: Insecta
- Order: Coleoptera
- Suborder: Polyphaga
- Infraorder: Cucujiformia
- Family: Cerambycidae
- Tribe: Callichromatini
- Genus: Plinthocoelium; Schmidt, 1924

Species
- 8, see text

Synonyms
- Callichroma LeConte, 1850; Plinthocoalium Arnett, 1962

= Plinthocoelium =

Genus of beetles

Plinthocoelium is a genus of beetles in the family Cerambycidae.

== Species ==
This genus includes the following species:

- Plinthocoelium chilensis (Blanchard in Gay, 1851) – Western Mexico (Chiapas, Durango, Jalisco, Oaxaca, Puebla, Sonora, Sinaloa)
- Plinthocoelium cobaltinum (LeConte, 1873) – North-west Mexico (Baja California)
- Plinthocoelium domingoense (Fisher, 1922) – Dominican Republic
- Plinthocoelium koppei Schmidt, 1924 – Mexico
- Plinthocoelium schwarzi (Fisher, 1914) – South-west United States (Texas)
- Plinthocoelium suaveolens (Linnaeus, 1768)
  - P. suaveolens suaveolens (Linnaeus, 1768) – South-east United States (Delaware, Florida, Texas)
  - P. suaveolens plicatum (LeConte, 1853) – South-west United States (Arizona, New Mexico, Texas), northern Mexico (Sonora)
- Plinthocoelium virens (Drury, 1770) – Cuba, Hispaniola, Jamaica, Bahamas
- Plinthocoelium xanthogastrum (Bates, 1880) – Nicaragua, Costa Rica
