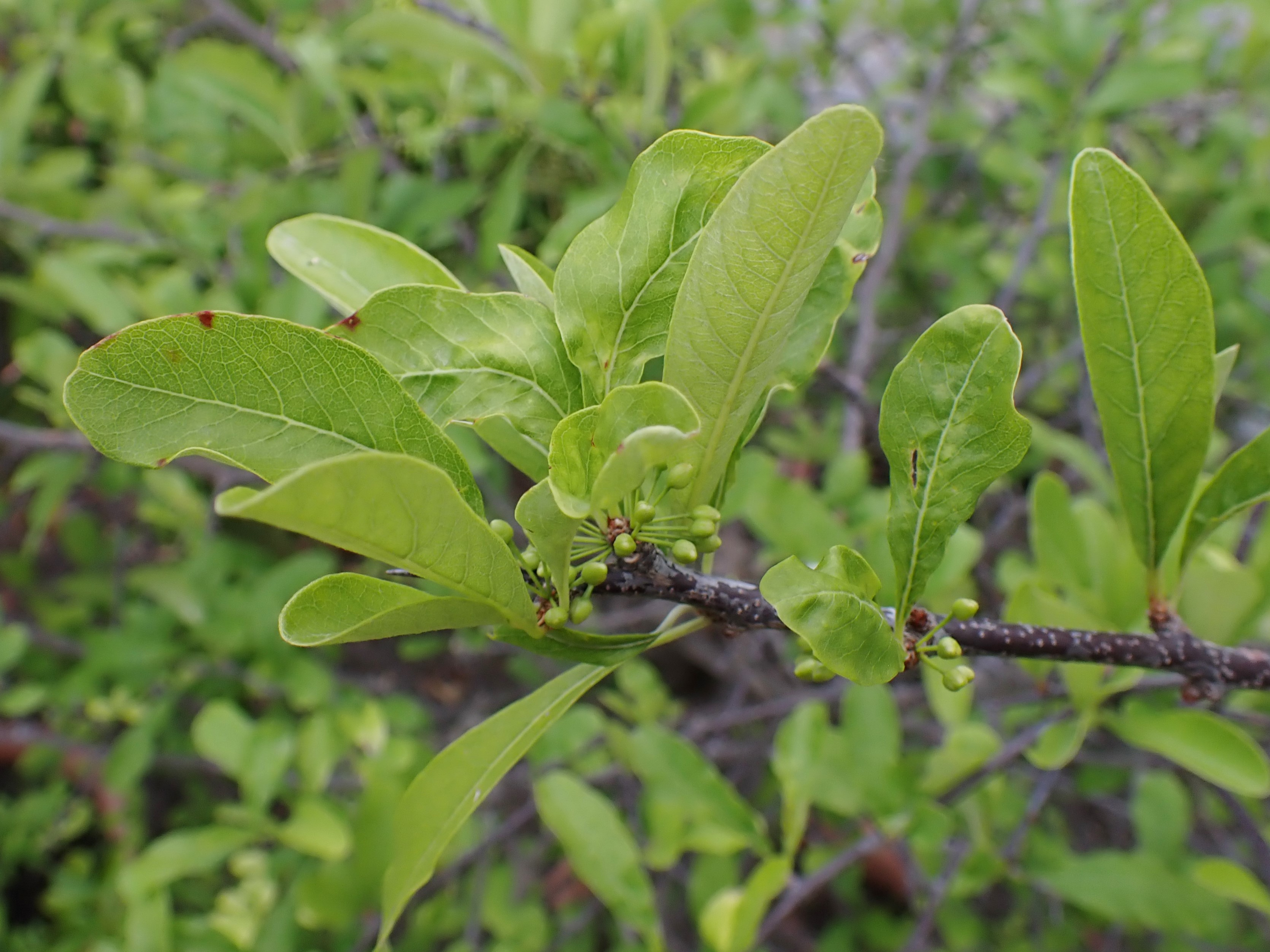

Conservation status
- Least Concern (IUCN 3.1)

- Apparently Secure (NatureServe)

Scientific classification
- Kingdom: Plantae
- Clade: Embryophytes
- Clade: Tracheophytes
- Clade: Spermatophytes
- Clade: Angiosperms
- Clade: Eudicots
- Clade: Asterids
- Order: Ericales
- Family: Sapotaceae
- Genus: Sideroxylon
- Species: S. lanuginosum

Binomial name
- Sideroxylon lanuginosum Michx.

Subspecies
- S. l. subsp. lanuginosum; S. l. subsp. oblongifolium; S. l. subsp. rigidum
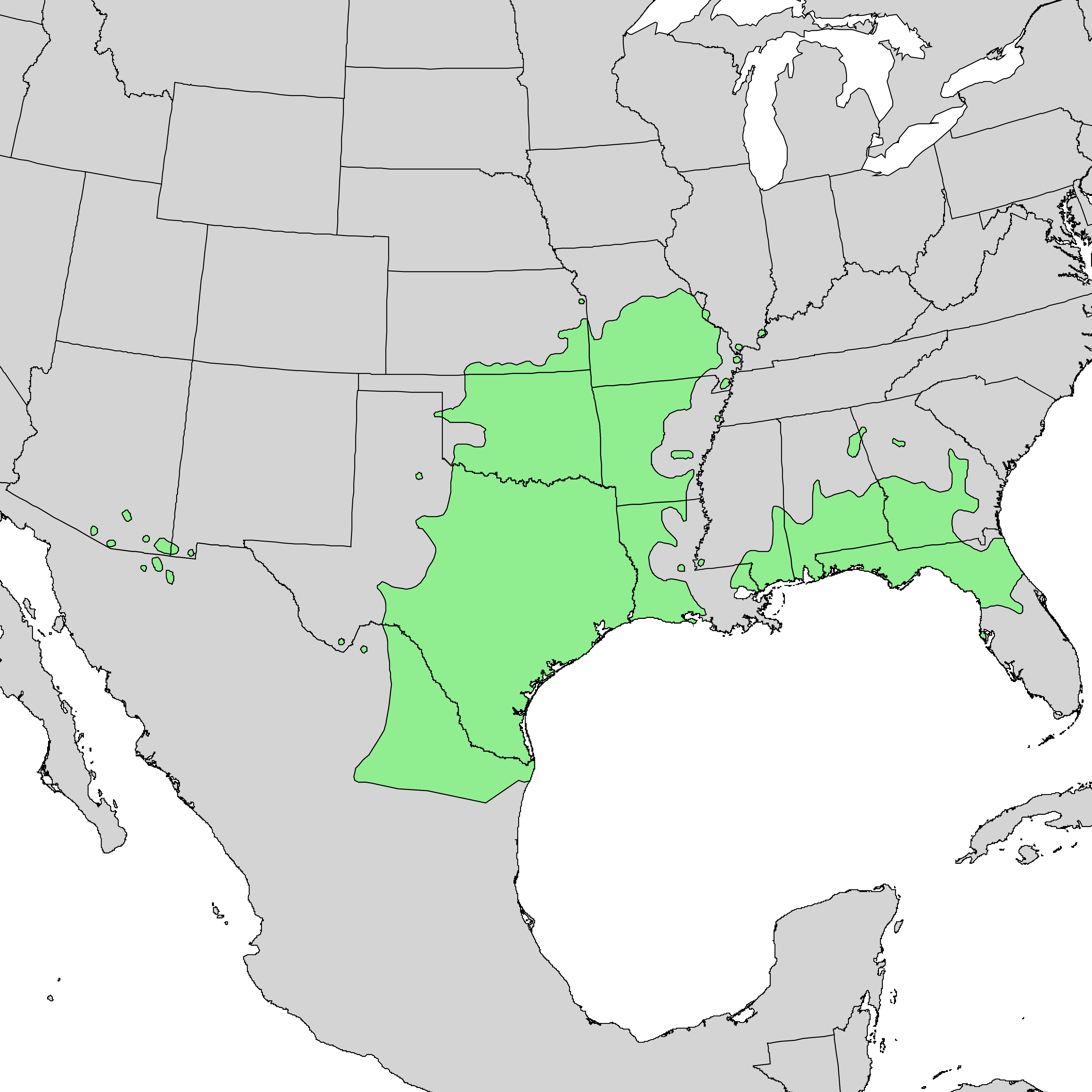
- Natural range

= Sideroxylon lanuginosum =

Gum bully

Species of tree

Sideroxylon lanuginosum is a shrub or small tree of the family Sapotaceae. It is native to the Sun Belt and Midwest of the United States as well as Northeastern Mexico. Common names include gum bully, black haw, chittamwood, chittimwood, shittamwood, false buckthorn, gum bumelia, gum elastic, gum woolybucket, woolybucket bumelia, wooly buckthorn, wooly bumelia, ironwood and coma.

The fruit of Bumelia lanuginosa is edible but can cause stomach aches or dizziness if eaten in large quantities. The Kiowa and Comanche tribes both consumed them when ripened. Gum from the trunk of the tree is sometimes chewed by children.

== Subspecies ==
- Sideroxylon lanuginosum subsp. lanuginosum (syn. Bumelia lanuginosa, Bumelia rufa)
- Sideroxylon lanuginosum subsp. oblongifolium (Nutt.) T.D.Penn. (syn. Sideroxylon lanuginosum ssp. albicans)
- Sideroxylon lanuginosum subsp. rigidum (A.Gray) T.D.Penn.
