= Booby Pond Nature Reserve =

Protected wetland in Little Cayman, Caribbean Sea

Coordinates: 19°39′00″N 80°04′00″W

Designations

Ramsar Wetland
- Official name: Booby Pond and Rookery
- Designated: 21 September 1994
- Reference no.: 702

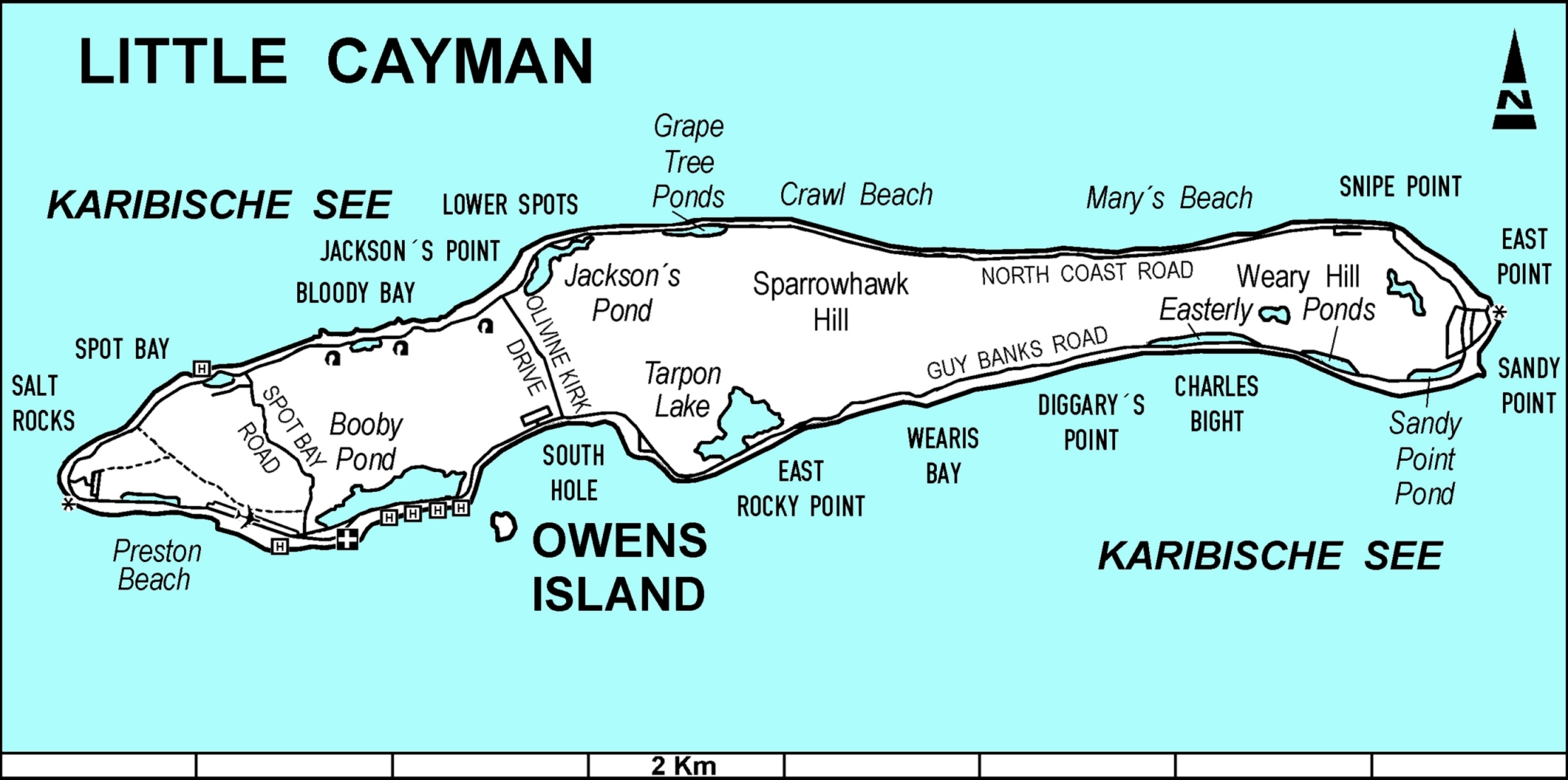
Booby Pond lies near the western end of the island

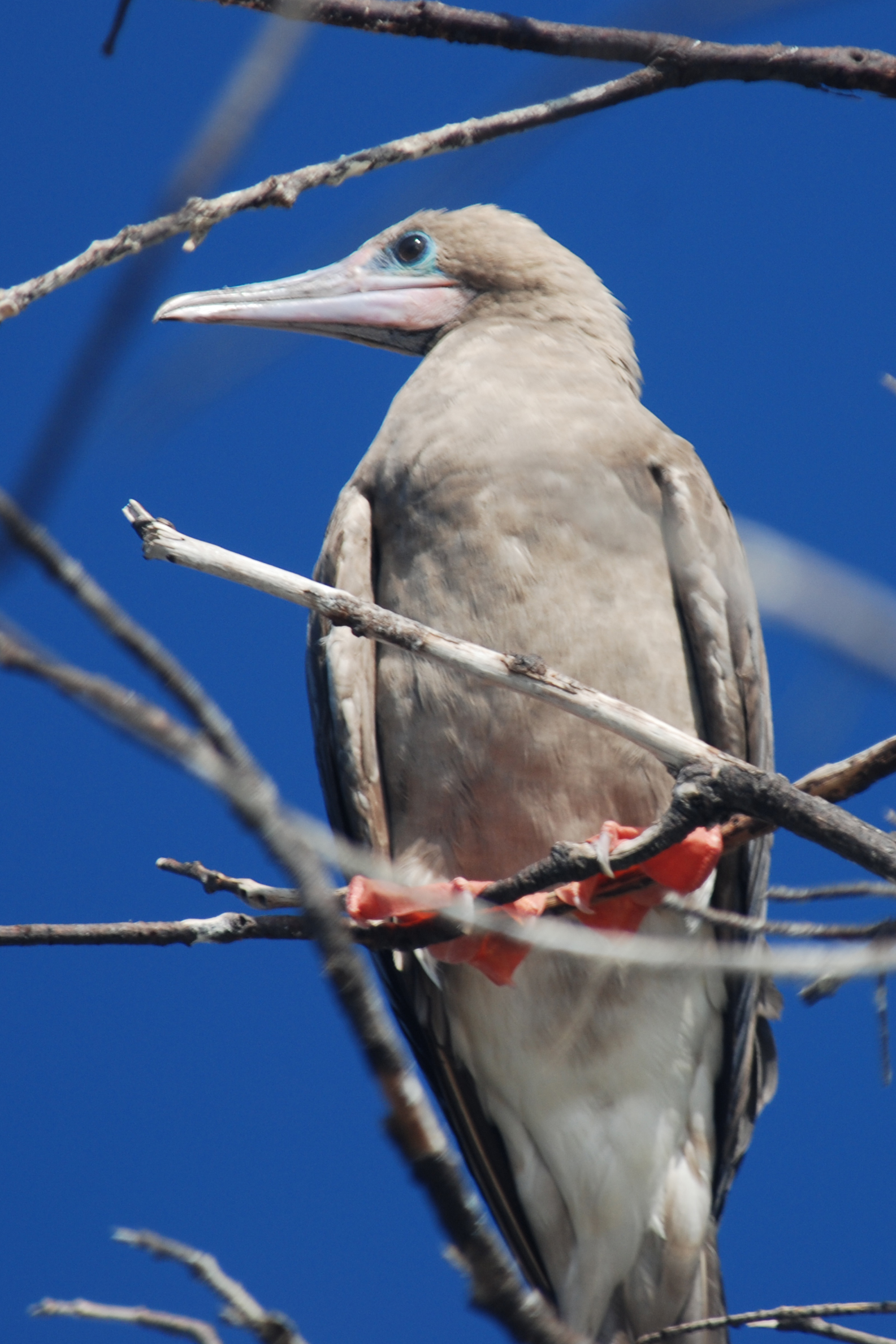
Red-footed booby on Little Cayman

Booby Pond Nature Reserve is a protected wetland on Little Cayman, one of the Cayman Islands, a British Overseas Territory in the Caribbean Sea.

== History ==
Booby Pond first gained its status as a protected area in 1993, when "Booby Pond and Rookery" was protected under The Animals (Sanctuaries) (Amendment) Regulations, 1993. It was designated a Ramsar site in 1994 and subsequently came under the management of the National Trust for the Cayman Islands, which started managing the site as the Booby Island Nature Reserve beginning in 1995. The majority of the reserve is owned by the National Trust, with privately-owned regions at the southern edge protected under the Cayman Islands’ Animals Law (2003 Revision). In 2017, neighbouring Crown land and private plots were added to the Booby Pond Nature Reserve under the National Conservation (Protected Areas) Order, 2017.

In 2025, a new airport was proposed to be constructed near Booby Pond, replacing the old Edward Bodden Airfield, which reportedly lacked a number of safety features required for it be re-certified. The proposal faced opposition from locals due to concerns surrounding overtourism, impact on the breeding sites and migratory routes of Booby Pond's birds, and flooding due to the impact on nearby mangroves.

== Description ==
The reserve lies on the south coast of Little Cayman, near the western end of the island. The nearest town is Blossom Village to the south of the reserve. It comprises a 43 ha seasonally flooded hypersaline lagoon with a fringe of mangroves and a strip of dry forest on its northern side. The mangroves along the edges generally consist of Avicennia germinans and Laguncularia racemosa, but the transition zone between mangroves and dry forest on the northern edge also features Rhizophora mangle. The forest is dominated by Bursera simaruba, Canella winterana, Coccothrinax procterii, Ficus aurea, Guipera discolour, Myrcianthus fragrans and Plumeria obtusa, while the mangroves are intermixed with Thespesia populnea and Cordia sebestena var. caymanensis.

=== Birds ===
The site has been identified by BirdLife International as a 136 ha Important Bird Area (IBA) because it supports populations of West Indian whistling ducks (with 20 breeding pairs), magnificent frigatebirds (with up to 200 breeding pairs), red-footed boobies (with up to 20,000 individuals), white-crowned pigeons, Caribbean elaenias, and vitelline warblers. The nesting colony of boobies may comprise as much as a third of the entire Caribbean and Atlantic population of that species. Much of the site is also recognised as a wetland of international importance under the Ramsar Convention.

=== Other fauna ===
The reserve and its adjacent areas contain important populations of the Sister Isles iguana (Cyclura nubila caymanensis) and Parker's dwarf boa (Tropidophis caymanensis parkeri), both critically endangered subspecies that only live in the Cayman Islands. Limestone glades near Booby Pond which are part of the Protected Area support populations of the Little Cayman land snail (Cerion nanus), a critically endangered mollusc endemic to Little Cayman. The reserve also contains other Cayman endemics like the Little Cayman green anole (Anolis maynardii) and Little Cayman racer (Cubophis ruttyi), as well as endemic insects and plants.
