= List of museums in the Cayman Islands =

This is a list of museums in the Cayman Islands.

== Museums in the Cayman Islands ==
- Bodden Town Mission House, Grand Cayman
- Cayman Islands National Museum
- Cayman Motor Museum
- National Gallery of the Cayman Islands
- Old Savannah School House

== See also ==
- List of museums
