= National Trust for the Cayman Islands =

The National Trust for the Cayman Islands is the national trust serving the Cayman Islands. Its purposes are to preserve sites of artistic and architectural interest in the islands and to provide protection for local natural resources and wildlife. It also oversees a program in which sites of special historic interest are marked with a plaque noting their importance.

== Projects ==
=== Grand Cayman ===
- Bodden Town Guardhouse Park
- Dr. Roy's Ironshore Historic Site
- East End Light House Park
- Fort George
- Governor Michael Gore Bird Sanctuary
- Heritage Beach
- Old Savannah School House
- Watler Cemetery
- Mastic Reserve and Trail
- Bodden Town Mission House, Grand Cayman
- Queen Elizabeth II Botanic Park
- home of Nurse Leila Yates, the only original wattle and daub house in the Trust's care

=== Cayman Brac ===
- Cayman Brac Parrot Reserve
- The Splits, Cayman Brac
- Spellman McLaughlin Home
- Eldemire House

=== Little Cayman ===
- Booby Pond Nature Reserve
- National Trust Visitors Centre of Little Cayman
