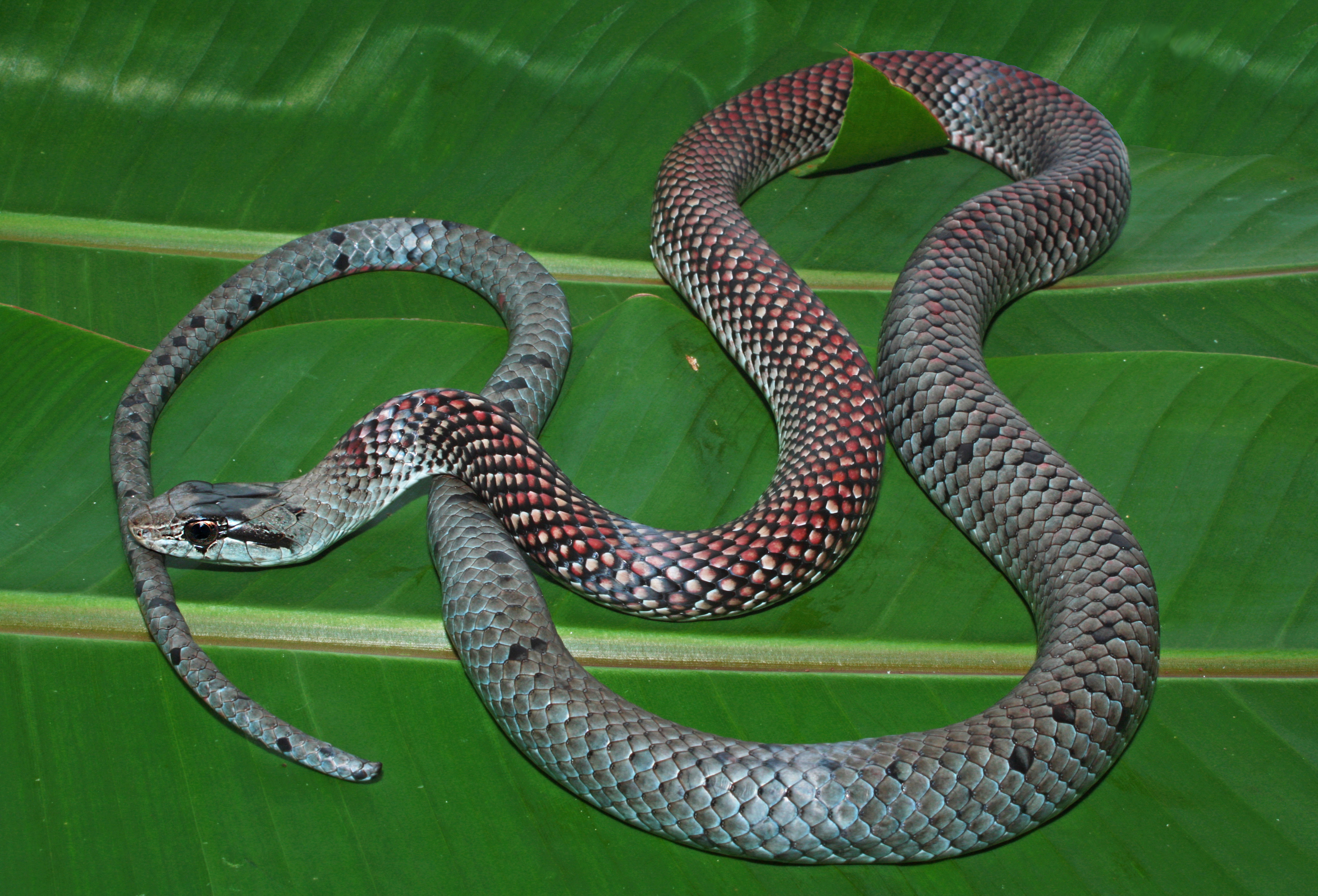
- Cubophis caymanus on a leaf.

Conservation status
- Least Concern (IUCN 3.1)

Scientific classification
- Kingdom: Animalia
- Phylum: Chordata
- Class: Reptilia
- Order: Squamata
- Suborder: Serpentes
- Family: Colubridae
- Genus: Cubophis
- Species: C. caymanus

Binomial name
- Cubophis caymanus (Garman, 1887)

Synonyms
- List: Alsophis cantherigerus caymanus Zimin et al., 2022; Alsophis caymanus Crother, 1999

= Cubophis caymanus =

Species of snake

Cubophis caymanus, the Grand Cayman racer, is a diurnal species of snake in the family Colubridae. The species is native to Grand Cayman Island. Its length typically ranges from 500–860 mm (20–34 in). The body is grey in color, with more distinct black, red and pink scales toward the head.

== Distribution and habitat ==
Like its name suggests, the Grand Cayman racer can be found only on Grand Cayman Island, the largest of the three Cayman Islands.

== Morphology ==
This species of snake is long and slim. Its length typically ranges from 500–860 mm (20–34 in). The length of its grey body is banded with black and red or pink colors. Females of C. caymanus are generally larger than males. The largest Grand Cayman racer to be recorded was a female specimen that measured 1,190 mm (47 in) long and weighed 1.25 kg (2.8 lb).

This species uniformly has a darkened head that includes a stripe which runs from the tip of the nostrils to the temporal scales. This species has a divided anal scale. The number of ventral scales is 171-177 for males and 174-178 for females.

Many individuals of this species are missing pieces of their tails, which might be a result of attacks from avian predators or interactions with land crabs.

== Diet and behavior ==
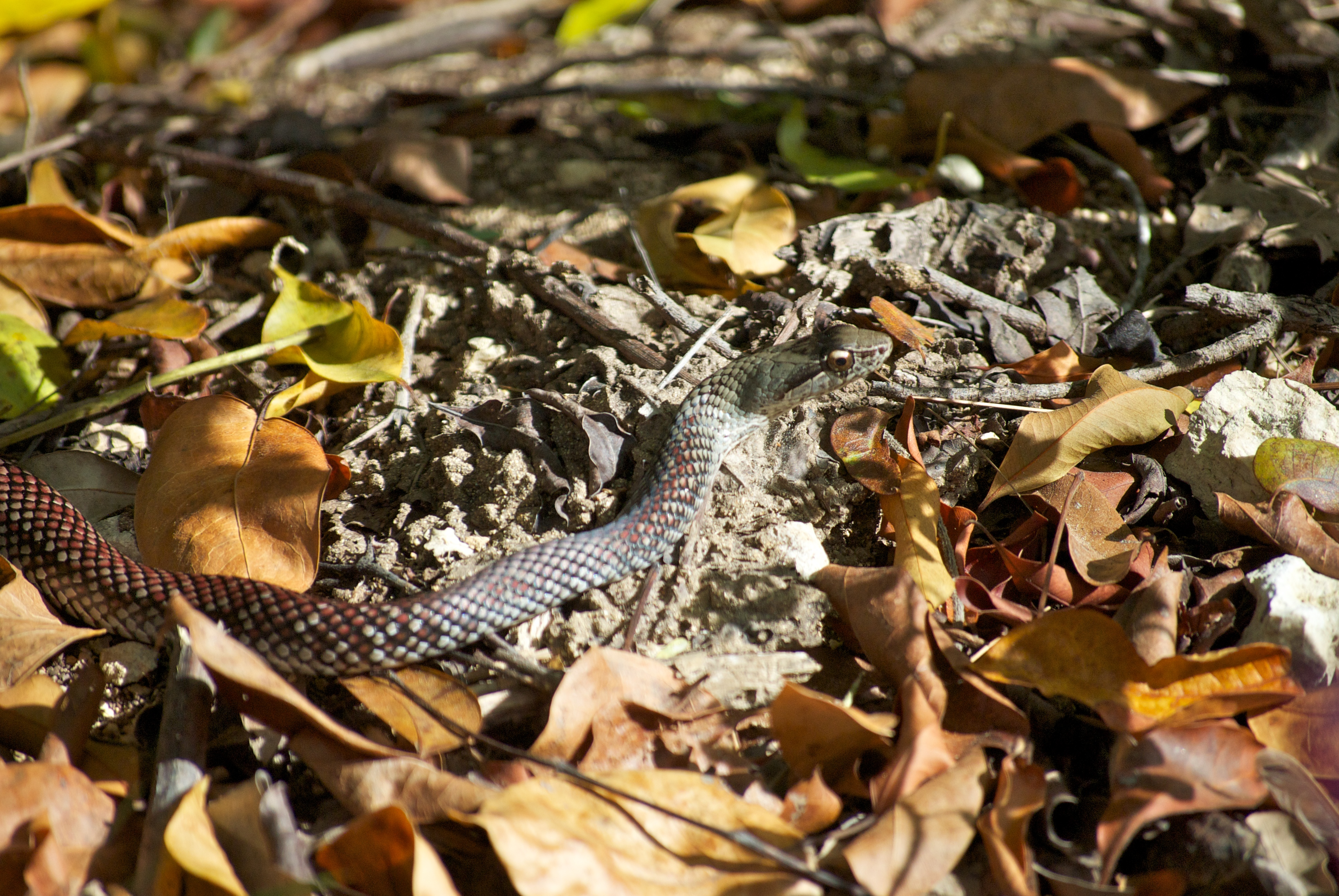
C. caymanus sitting among leaf litter.

The diet of Cubophis caymanus is known to consist of the greenhouse frog (Eleutherodactylus planirostris), the green iguana (Iguana iguana) and local species of anole (Anolis spp.).

This species likely opportunistically consumes many small animals found on the island, as it is colloquially known to commonly prey on the Cuban tree frog (Osteopilus septentrionalis), young nestling birds, and small rats.

C. caymanus has a weak venom used to subdue prey. However, C. caymanus often uses constriction as well. This species is both terrestrial and arboreal in nature, allowing it to pursue prey that likewise encompass both strata, such as the green iguana.

=== Threat display ===
When threatened, C. caymanus will expand its throat on either side. This works to flatten and enlarge its head to appear more threatening. In addition, these snakes may exhibit musking behaviors in their attempts to deter predators. The musk of these snakes is described as having a smell similar to that of garbage or a dumpster.

== Reproduction ==
This species is known to be oviparous. Clutches laid by C. caymanus may include 8-9 eggs. Nesting lasts for about 4 months. laying begins in May, and the eggs will begin hatching from August until around the end of September.

== Threats & conservation ==
Not much has been officially documented regarding the threats and conservation of this species on the island. However, because the island is populated by people this species will face human threats including the presence of pets and cars.

This species is currently under government protection under Part II of the Cayman Island's National Conservation Law, which entitles the population to conservation management, public awareness programming and preventative reconciliation (Including possible fines or license revocation).
