= Cubophis brooksi =

Conservation status
- Critically Endangered (IUCN 3.1)

Scientific classification
- Kingdom: Animalia
- Phylum: Chordata
- Class: Reptilia
- Order: Squamata
- Suborder: Serpentes
- Family: Colubridae
- Genus: Cubophis
- Species: C. brooksi

Binomial name
- Cubophis brooksi (Barbour, 1914)

Species of snake

Cubophis brooksi, the Swan Island racer, is a species of colubrid snake endemic to Little Swan Island in the Swan Islands (Islas del Cisne) of Honduras. It is known from only a few specimens, all female, and is listed as Critically Endangered on the IUCN Red List.

== Taxonomy ==
The species was described by Thomas Barbour in 1914 as Alsophis brooksi, based on two syntypes (MCZ 7893) collected on Little Swan Island in 1912. For much of the 20th century it was treated as a subspecies of the Cuban racer, as Alsophis cantherigerus brooksi. Hedges, Couloux, and Vidal erected the genus Cubophis in 2009, and McCranie (2011) recommended recognizing brooksi as a full species on morphological grounds.

The specific name, brooksi, honors William A. Brooks, president of the Swan Island Commercial Company at the time the syntypes were collected.

== Description ==
Cubophis brooksi is a large, spotted racer. The four known specimens are all female; the largest has a total length of about 1,360 mm (54 in), with a snout–vent length of up to 855 mm (33.7 in). In preserved specimens the body is grayish black with pale brown spots that enlarge toward the tail. The dorsal scales are smooth and arranged in 17–17–13 rows, with 176–181 ventral scales and a divided anal scale. Males and the hemipenes have not been described.

== Distribution and habitat ==
The species is endemic to Little Swan Island (Isla Pequeña) in the Islas del Cisne, Gracias a Dios, Honduras. It has been recorded in lowland dry forest at about 5 m (16 ft) elevation.

== Ecology ==
Little is known about the biology of C. brooksi. No feeding has been observed directly; by comparison with its Cuban, Caymanian, and Bahamian relatives, which forage by day, adults are thought to take small birds and young green iguanas, and juveniles to take anoles (Norops nelsoni), as frogs are absent from the islands. The Swan Island hutia, which became extinct around 1960, may formerly have been prey. Reproduction is undocumented, although related species of Cubophis lay clutches of 4–24 eggs.

== Status ==
Cubophis brooksi is known from only a few specimens, all female; the two syntypes were collected in 1912 and the most recent specimen in 1997. A 2012 survey of the Swan Islands did not find the snake, which was reported to remain poorly known. The IUCN lists it as Critically Endangered.
