= List of amphibians and reptiles of the Cayman Islands =

This is a list of species of reptiles and amphibian found on the British overseas territory of the Cayman Islands, located in the Greater Antilles chain in the Caribbean. The territory consists largely of three islands: Grand Cayman (GC), Little Cayman (LC), and Cayman Brac (CB).

== Amphibians ==
=== Frogs (Anura) ===
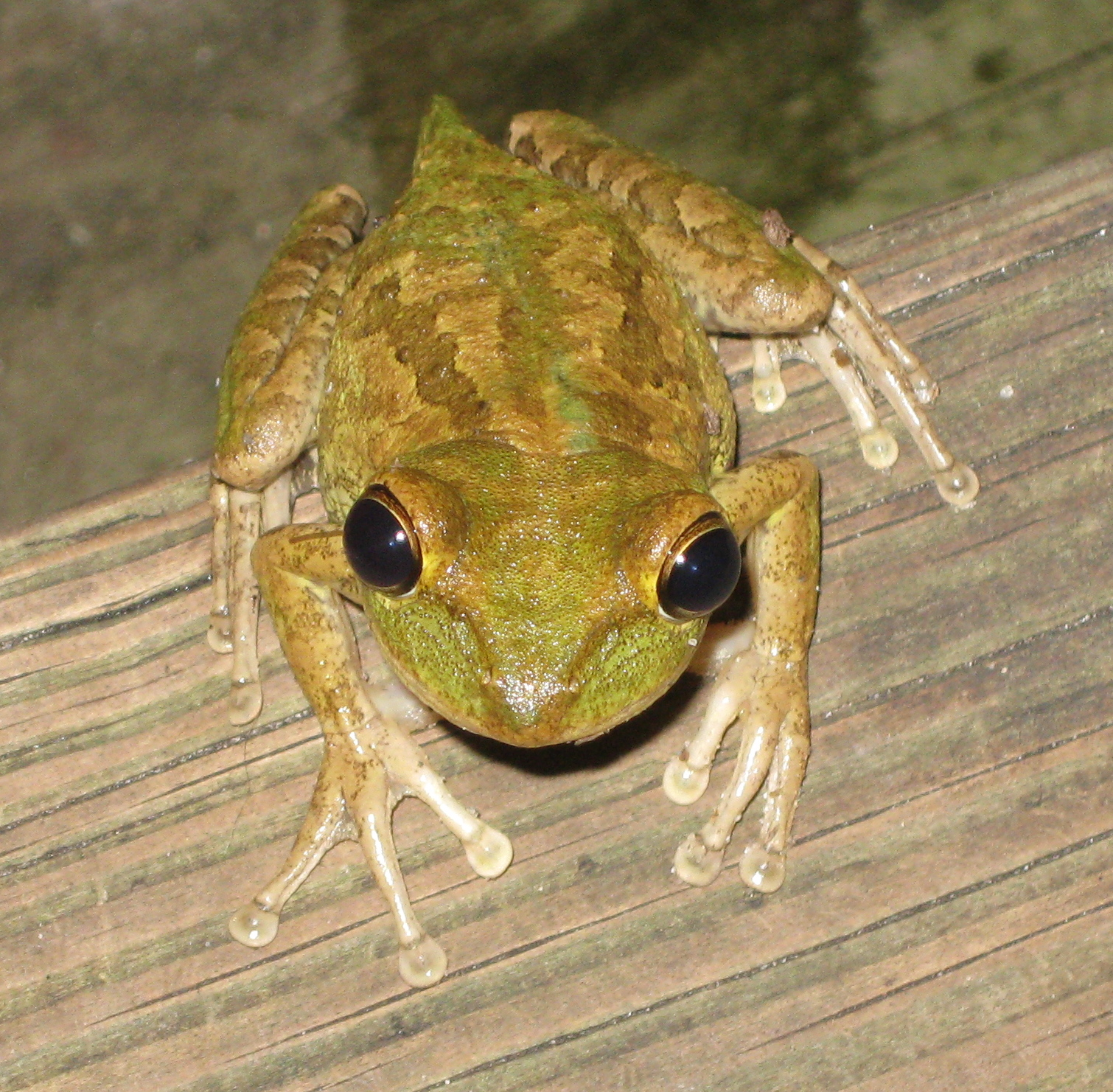
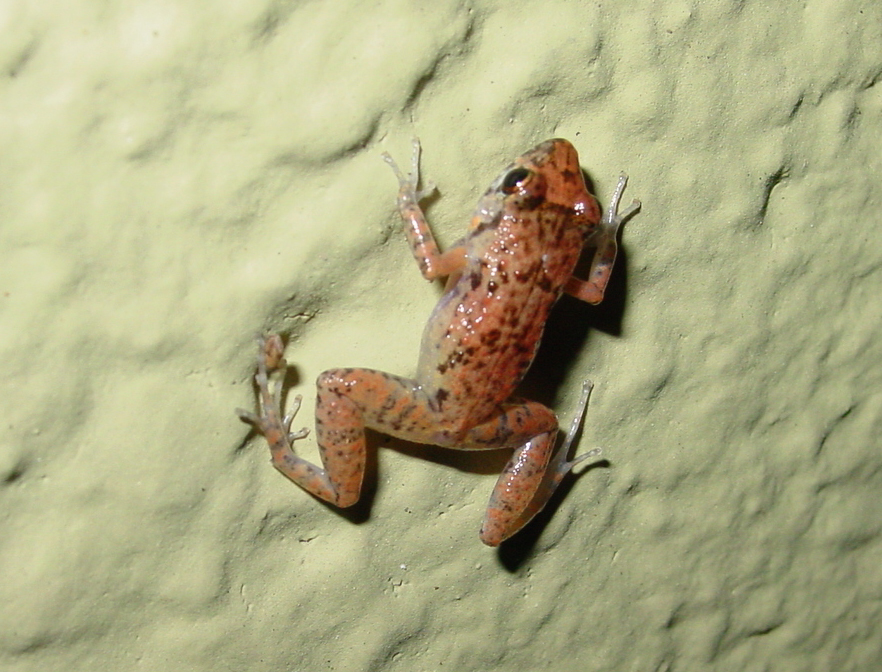
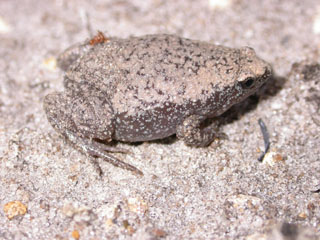
Tree frogs (Hylidae)
| Species | Common name(s) | Notes | Image |
|---|---|---|---|
| Osteopilus septentrionalis | Cuban tree frog | Least concern. Native to all of the island chain. |
Tropical frogs (Leptodactylidae)
| Species | Common name(s) | Notes | Image |
| Eleutherodactylus planirostris | Greenhouse frog | Least concern. Native and found on GC and CB. |
Narrowmouth frogs (Microhylidae)
| Species | Common name(s) | Notes | Image |
| Gastrophryne carolinensis | Eastern narrowmouth toad | Least concern. Introduced and found on GC. |
