= Cistudinella =

Scientific classification
- Kingdom: Animalia
- Phylum: Arthropoda
- Clade: Pancrustacea
- Class: Insecta
- Order: Coleoptera
- Suborder: Polyphaga
- Infraorder: Cucujiformia
- Family: Chrysomelidae
- Subfamily: Cassidinae
- Tribe: Ischyrosonychini
- Genus: Cistudinella; Champion, 1894

Genus of leaf beetles

Cistudinella is a genus of leaf beetles of the family Chrysomelidae.

== Species ==
- Cistudinella apiata (Boheman, 1854)
- Cistudinella bahiana Spaeth, 1931
- Cistudinella biguttata Hincks, 1956
- Cistudinella bipunctata (Kirsch, 1883)
- Cistudinella foveolata Champion, 1894
- Cistudinella inanis (Boheman, 1854)
- Cistudinella lata Spaeth, 1932
- Cistudinella lateripunctata Spaeth, 1905
- Cistudinella notata (Boheman, 1854)
- Cistudinella obducta (Boheman, 1854)
- Cistudinella parva (Wagener, 1881)
- Cistudinella peruana Spaeth, 1905
- Cistudinella plagicollis Spaeth, 1905
- Cistudinella punctipennis (Boheman, 1854)
- Cistudinella rufitarsis Spaeth, 1905
