= Spellman McLaughlin Home =

Coordinates: 19.7453°N 79.7666°W

The Spellman McLaughlin Home is a historic home on Cayman Brac, Cayman Islands. Located in Creek, Cayman Brac, the home stands on the top of a small hill alongside Creek Road.

== Construction ==
Spellman McLaughin, who hailed from East End, Grand Cayman, moved to Cayman Brac with his family at age 16 and married there. In 1926, he began constructing the home to his own design. Constructed of timber imported from Mobile, Alabama and Pensacola, Florida, the planks were cut on-site. Although he had help with the home's construction, McLaughlin oversaw every detail himself and construction would have to be halted when he went off to sea, which he had to do in order to earn his living.

Built largely of pine, the home was completed in 1930 and full-section log posts were sunk into the ground to support the home above the ground. Very few nails were used in the home's construction and cedar shingles were used as roofing for the home.

The home's roof was constructed with three gable ends at the front of it, giving the impression that the house has two stories, when it actually has only one.

== Layout ==
The home has eight exterior rooms built around a central dining room. Each of these rooms has windows and a door to the home's wrap-around verandah. The home's rooms that face northwest and central dining room were designed to be the home's formal rooms and have elaborate ceilings. The home's dining room has diagonal wall paneling and the home's front sitting room has a domed, beaded board ceiling.

The rooms on the southeastern side of the home, which were considered to be the hottest, did not have ceilings so hot air could rise into the roof space, therefore keeping the room as cool as possible. The kitchen, housed in a separate structure outside the home at the time of construction, was later installed in the southeastern section.

== 1932 storm ==
130 people sought shelter in the storm during “the great hurricane of 1932” which caused heavy destruction to Cayman Brac in November of that year. The home's windows managed to hold and despite a boulder crashing through the home's front door which allowed water to enter, the storm inflicted no further damage.

The home was amongst the few structures to survive the storm intact and served as a distribution point for scarce emergency supplies sent from Jamaica.

== Present day ==
Today, the wood used to construct the home is still in good condition, despite exposure from the sun, wind and salt. Zinc roofing now covers the roof, although the original cedar roofing lies underneath.

The home received the Award of Distinction for the Preservation of Historic Places in 1995 by the National Trust for the Cayman Islands. This award was presented to Spellman McLaughlin's daughter, Brunzil Rivers, who lived in the home at the time with her family.

The McLaughlin family lived in the home until the property was sold in 2011.
