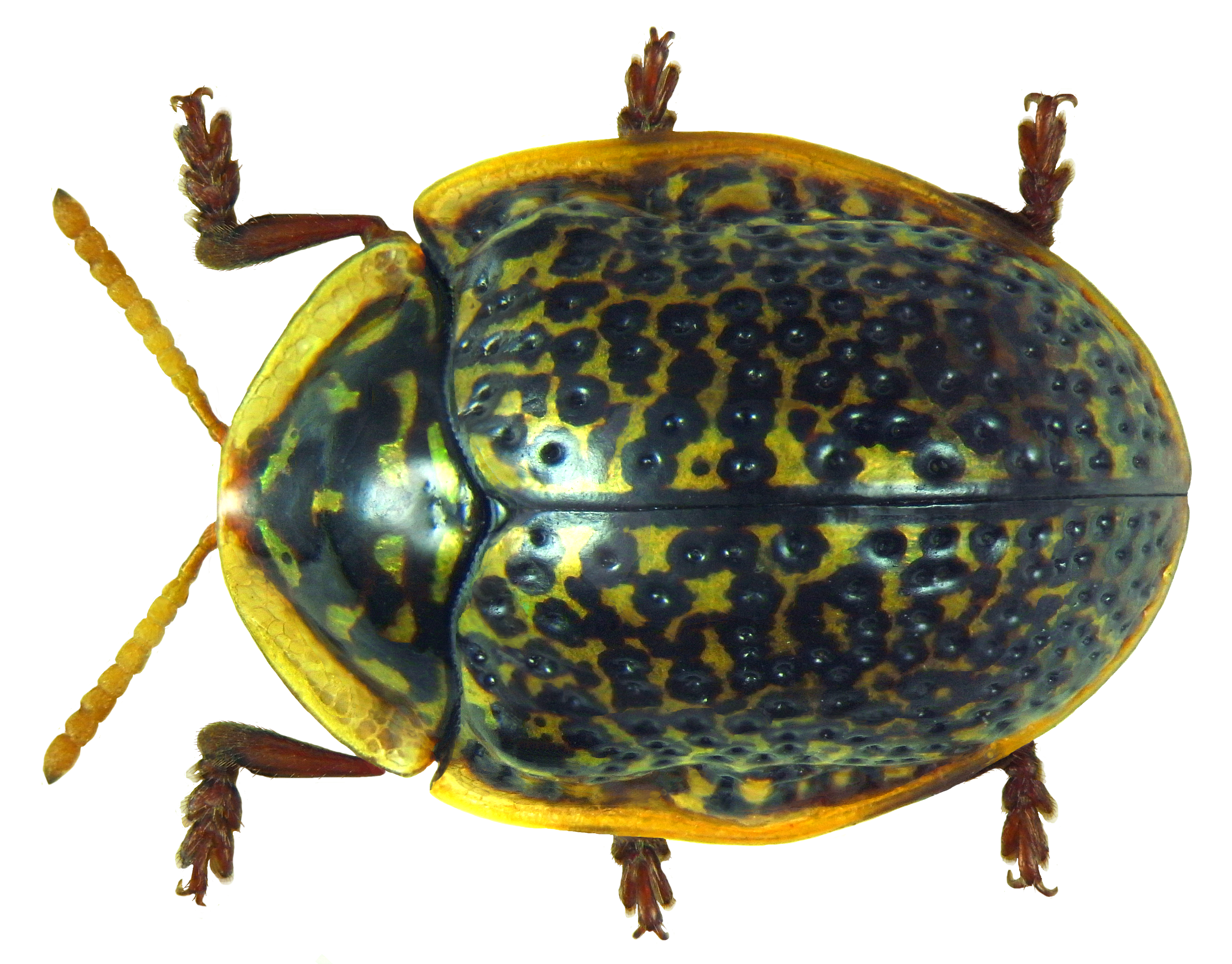
- Asteriza flavicornis

Scientific classification
- Kingdom: Animalia
- Phylum: Arthropoda
- Clade: Pancrustacea
- Class: Insecta
- Order: Coleoptera
- Suborder: Polyphaga
- Infraorder: Cucujiformia
- Family: Chrysomelidae
- Subfamily: Cassidinae
- Tribe: Ischyrosonychini; Chapuis, 1875

Synonyms
- Physonotini Spaeth, 1942

= Ischyrosonychini =

Tribe of beetles

Ischyrosonychini is a tribe of tortoise beetles and hispines in the family Chrysomelidae. There are about 7 genera and at least 70 described species in Ischyrosonychini.

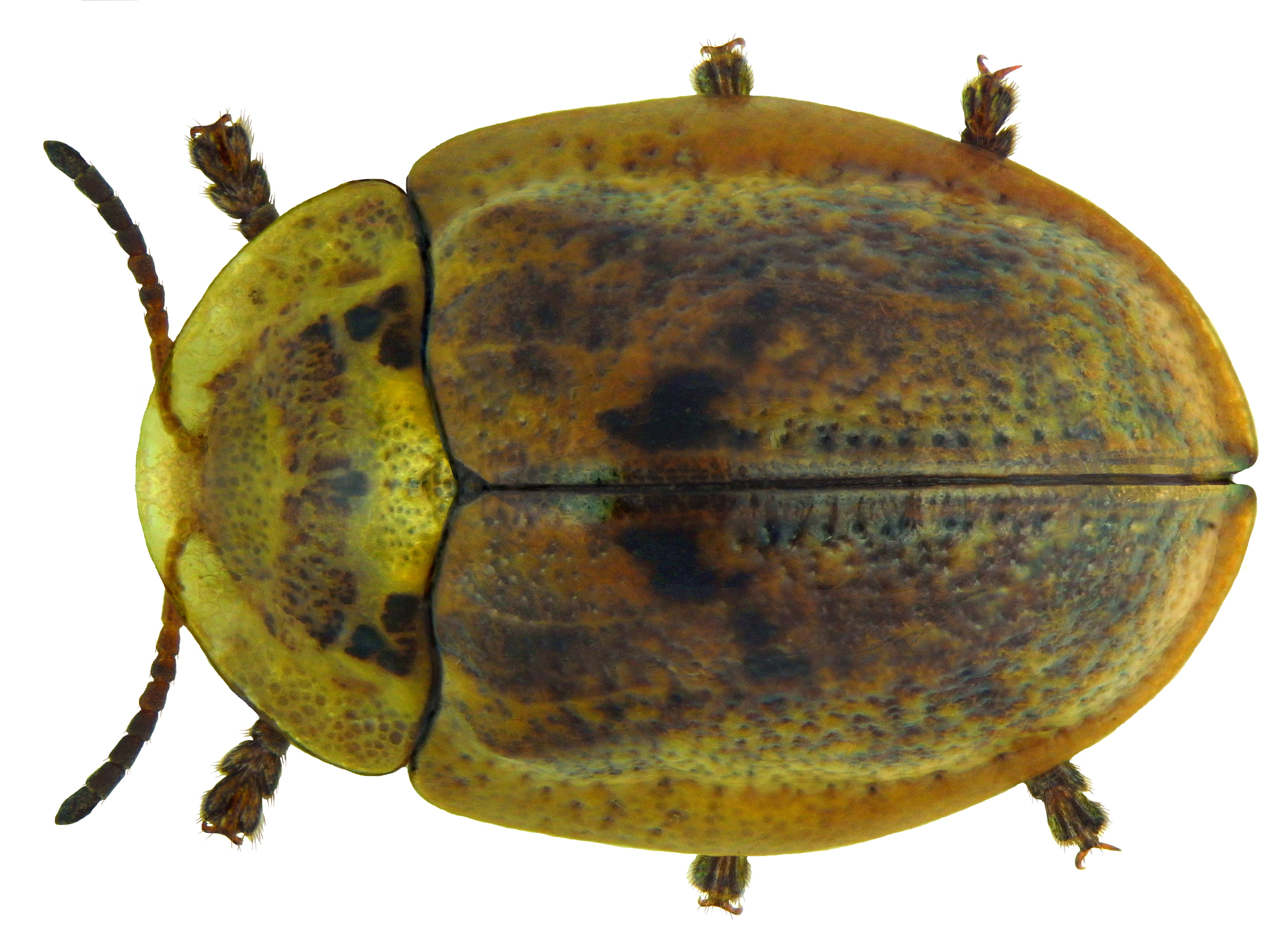
Physonota alutacea

Juvenile stages have been described.

== Genera ==
These seven genera belong to the tribe Ischyrosonychini:

- Asteriza Chevrolat in Dejean, 1836
- Cistudinella Champion, 1894
- Enagria Spaeth, 1913
- Eurypedus Gistel, 1834
- Eurypepla Boheman, 1854
- Orexita Spaeth, 1911
- Physonota Boheman, 1854
- Platycycla Boheman, 1854
