= Fort George, Grand Cayman =

Coordinates: 19°17′48″N 81°22′58″W

Fort George is a colonial era fortification located on Grand Cayman, Cayman Islands. Located in George Town, Grand Cayman, the structure stands on the corner of Harbour Drive and Fort Street. Although in present-day there is very little remaining of the original structure, its remains have been donated to the National Trust for the Cayman Islands in perpetuity. Fort George was one of the first fortifications built on the Cayman Islands during the early colonial period.

== History ==
In 1662, the then Governor of Jamaica, Lord Windsor, received royal instructions to protect the "Caimanes Islands ... by planting and raising Fortifications upon them"; the fortification, however, was not constructed until 1790. Fort George was built using local coral rock and limestone ironshore with its design being based largely on the English fortifications of the time. The oval base of the Fort measured approximately 57 feet by 38 feet. There were eight embrasures for cannons around the sides of the fort and a mahogany gate on the fort's landward side. The walls of Fort George ranged in thickness from two feet on its landward side to five feet on its seaward side, with the walls being about five feet in height.

In 1802, when Edward Corbet came to Grand Cayman to compile a report for the Governor of Jamaica, he found the Fort "by no means well equipped" with only "three guns, four to six pounders", rather than the eight required by the original scheme.

=== Fort George in the 20th century ===
By the beginning of the 20th century, the fort was no longer in use. During World War II, a tall silk cotton tree growing within the fort was used as a lookout post. Members of the Home Guard, whose barracks were located next to the fort at Dobson Hall, would climb up into the tree's branches to watch for German submarines, many of which patrolled Caribbean waters hunting for merchant ships setting out to cross the Atlantic with supplies bound for English ports.

In 1972, the Cayman Islands Planning Authority and a local developer were embroiled in a disagreement over the fort's future. The developer started the demolition of the structure, however, because of the objections raised by the local public, destruction of the site was halted. What remained of the structure was donated to the National Trust for the Cayman Islands in 1987.

=== 21st century ===
In 2013, renovation began on Fort George. The renovation included a large mural, native plants, signage, as well as a recreation of the former lookout post. Renovations were complete in February 2014.
