= Orexita complanata =

Scientific classification
- Kingdom: Animalia
- Phylum: Arthropoda
- Clade: Pancrustacea
- Class: Insecta
- Order: Coleoptera
- Suborder: Polyphaga
- Infraorder: Cucujiformia
- Family: Chrysomelidae
- Genus: Orexita
- Species: O. complanata

Binomial name
- Orexita complanata (Boheman, 1855)

Synonyms
- Coplocycla complanata Boheman, 1855

Species of beetle

Orexita complanata is a species of beetle of the family Chrysomelidae. It is found in Brazil (Minas Gerais, Pernambuco, Rio de Janeiro).
