= Leila Yates =

Caymanian nurse and midwife

- Born: Irksie Leila Yates; 19 August 1899; West Bay District, Grand Cayman, Cayman Islands
- Died: 12 January 1996 (aged 96)
- Occupations: nurse, midwife
- Years active: 1919–1971

Irksie Leila Yates (19 August 1899 – 12 January 1996) was a pioneering nurse and midwife from the Cayman Islands. She has been recognized on a stamp in the 2011 series "Pioneers in our History" and in 2015 was posthumously honored with the National Heroes Award. Her home has been the focus of a restoration project for the National Trust’s West Bay Committee.

== Early life ==
Irksie Leila Yates was born on 19 August 1899 in the West Bay District on Grand Cayman in the Cayman Islands to Jacintha (née Morrison) and Arthur Yates. Yates was the youngest of six children and though she enjoyed playing on the beaches as a child, was asthmatic. Hers was the first house on the island to have glass panes installed. Encouraged by her sister, Yates wanted to study nursing, but her mother objected. Determined to become a nurse, she walked daily from West Bay to George Town for her training. Her initial studies began in 1917 with Dr. George Overton, the only doctor on the island.

== Career ==
By 1919, Yates had completed her training and began as a home care nurse, traveling to her patients' homes to assist with their needs. In 1921, she began studying midwifery and completed her training in 1923, when she delivered her first baby. During the malaria epidemic in 1931, Yates served as head government nurse. Because there was no government hospital, almost all of her care services before 1952 when the Cayman Hospital was built, were provided in her patient's homes.

In 1959 Yates opened a private nursing clinic in her home in West Bay and continued to see patients in her home or their own homes. In her later years, she worked as a reporter writing a regular column "This Week in West Bay" for the newspaper, Caymanian Weekly. Yates retired in 1971, having delivered more than 1,000 babies.

== Death and legacy ==
Yates died on 12 January 1996. In 2006, her home was purchased by the National Trust of the Cayman Islands to honor her achievements in nursing and preserve the culturally significant building, as the National Trust's only original wattle and daub dwelling. In 2011, Yates was recognized with a stamp depicting her likeness as a part of the series "Pioneers in our History". In 2015 she was honored at the National Heroes Awards ceremony, recognizing Caymanians who helped to develop health services for the Islands. In 2016, her columns from the 1966 Caymanian Weekly are being re-run in the Cayman Compass as a weekly series called "50 years ago".
