= Watler Cemetery =

Cemetery in Prospect, Grand Cayman

Coordinates: 19.274°N 81.335°W

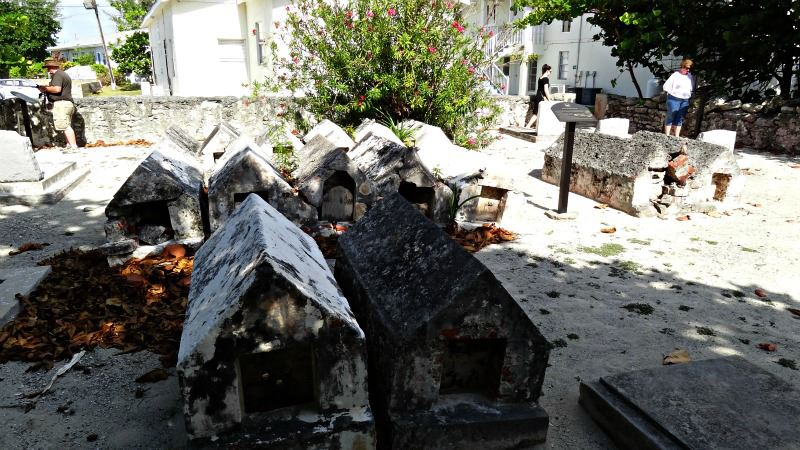
The Watler Cemetery at Prospect, Grand Cayman. Grand Cayman Islands, British West Indies

The Watler Cemetery is a historic cemetery located in Prospect, Grand Cayman. It was donated to the National Trust for the Cayman Islands by the Watler family in 1991.

Although the graves in the cemetery date from the beginning of the 19th century, the site was in use before that time, as Watlers have lived in the Cayman Islands since the 17th century and are among the original settlers of Cayman. It is thought that the name is derived from the fact that watlers in Wales were craftsmen who specialized in the construction of wattles, a form of thatched roofing.

Watler Cemetery is notable for the number of traditionally Welsh constructed graves which still stand today. Shaped like houses, the memorials are constructed from a combination of crushed coral and limestone daub. Similar markers dating to the Middle Ages, have been found in both England and Wales, and markers in this style dating to the 17th century may be seen across the British West Indies. Boulders are heavy enough that only the most violent storms can dislodge them. Some graves may have had a mahogany tablet set into one wall, but this fact is disputed. More modern stones may cover numerous burials, but these structures were designed for only one body each.

Today this cemetery is enclosed by a stone wall. The original entrance is now filled in, but evidence of its original location can be seen almost directly across from the current entrance. Mature trees surround the graveyard, and the Prospect Youth Centre is located on the eastern side of the cemetery. The centre is run by the United Church.

The cemetery is almost all that remains of Prospect, although residents still identify the area by name when describing their neighborhood.

== Cemetery markers ==
The National Trust of the Cayman Islands placed several plaques in the Watler Cemetery. The plaques are described below:

=== The Watler Cemetery – a typical family cemetery ===
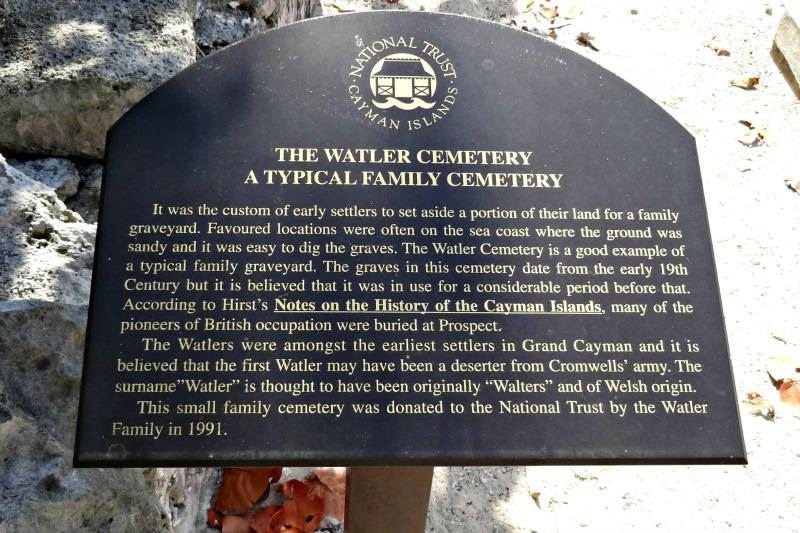
Watler Cemetery Grand Cayman Plaque, "The Watler Cemetery A Typical Family Cemetery"

As the plaque asserts, it was the custom of early island settlers to set aside a portion of their land as family graveyard. The Watler Cemetery is a good example of a typical Caymanian family graveyard. The graves date from the early 19th Century, but it is believed that it was in use for a considerable period before that. According to Hirst's Notes on the History of the Cayman Islands, many of the pioneers were of British and Welsh descent and are buried at Prospect.

The Watlers were among the earliest settlers in Cayman. Some have asserted that the first Watler was a deserter from Cromwell's army. However, with the advent of the Internet and widespread access to authentic documentation of genealogical history & migration, this assertion has been found to be a myth.

The surname "Watler" is of Welsh origin. As is the case with most Anglo-Saxon surnames, the name originates as a description of the familial vocational craft. In this case, it was he who built wattles: A Watler.

This small family cemetery was donated to the National Trust by the Watler family in 1991.

=== House-shaped graves ===
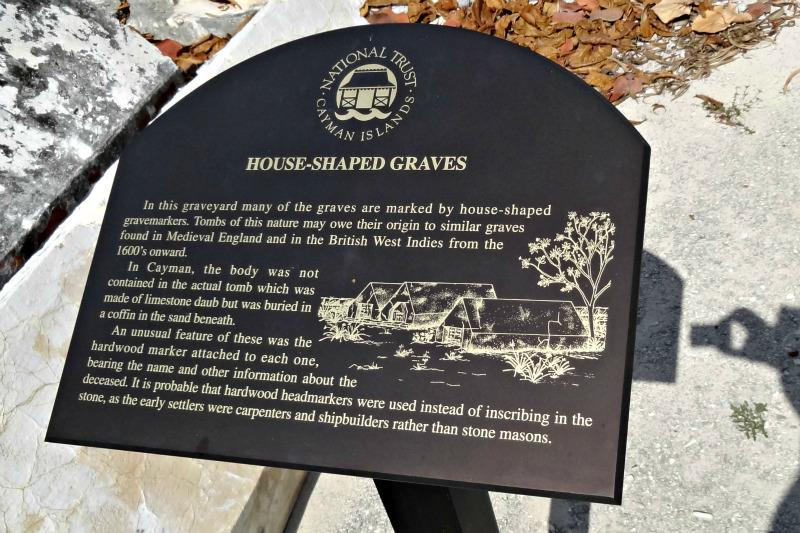
Watler Cemetery Grand Cayman Plaque – House-Shaped Graves

Characteristically, most of the graves are marked by house-shaped tombs. Tomb structures of this nature originated in England where karst made grave digging for underground burial impractical. This is also the case in many British West Indies islands where "iron shore," which are coral geological conditions, also make underground graves impractical. Upon BWI island settlement from the 1600s onward, this method of burial was simply an exported custom, along with many other customs familiar to the settlers.

Some assert these tombs once exhibited an unusual feature: A hardwood marker bearing the name and other information about the deceased. It is further alleged that these hardwood headmarkers were used instead of inscribing in the stone because the early settlers were carpenters and shipbuilders rather than stonemasons. This is disputed by others.

=== Early settlement and the work of the church at Prospect ===
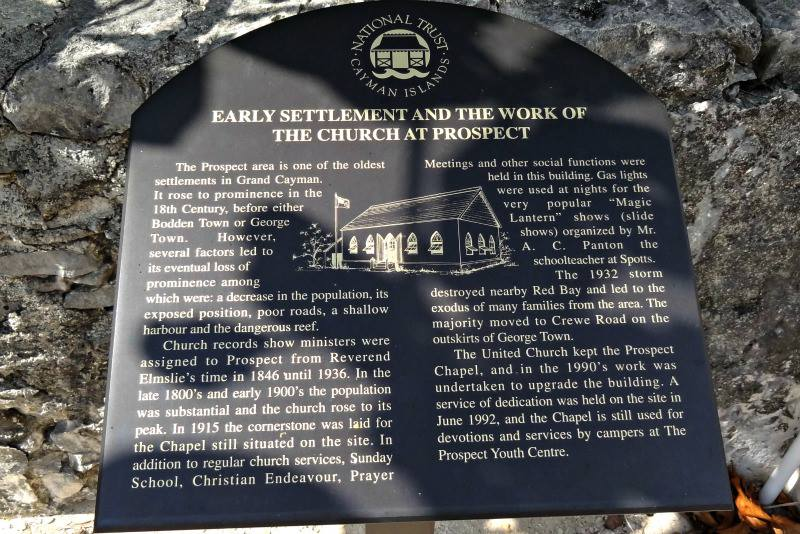
Watler Cemetery Grand Cayman Plaque – Early Church and Settlement

The Prospect area is one of the oldest settlements in Grand Cayman. It rose to residential prominence in the 18th century before Bodden Town or perhaps even George Town. However, several factors led to its population decrease. Its geographical position left it vulnerable to bad weather, especially during nor'westor storms, resulting in roads that were frequently washed out. Further, what little harbor exists is shallow, thus further isolating its residents from sea access, which even today continues to be a substantial means of transportation between island locales. The lack of any substantial barrier reef that offers other island towns at least some protection against these elements, further left the area vulnerable.

Church records show ministers were assigned to Prospect from Reverend Elmsie's time in 1846 until 1936. This helped to substantially increase the population, at which time, it is noted, church membership peaked at Prospect. In 1915 the cornerstone was laid for the chapel still sitting on the site. In addition to regular church services, Sunday School, Christian Endeavour, Prayer Meetings and other social functions were held in this building. Gas lights were used at for the very popular evening "Magic Lantern" shows (slide shows) organized by Mr. A. C. Panton, the schoolteacher at nearby Spotts.

However, the infamous hurricane of 1932 destroyed nearby Red Bay and led to the exodus from the area of some families to places like Crewe Road (outskirts of George Town) and Savannah. The United Church kept the Prospect Chapel, and in the 1990s, work was finally undertaken to rehabilitate the building. A service of dedication was held on the site in June, 1992. Today the chapel is still used for devotions and services by campers at the Prospect Youth Centre.
