= Eurypedus =

Scientific classification
- Kingdom: Animalia
- Phylum: Arthropoda
- Clade: Pancrustacea
- Class: Insecta
- Order: Coleoptera
- Suborder: Polyphaga
- Infraorder: Cucujiformia
- Family: Chrysomelidae
- Subfamily: Cassidinae
- Tribe: Ischyrosonychini
- Genus: Eurypedus; Gistel, 1834

Synonyms
- Ischyrosonyx Sturm, 1843

Genus of leaf beetles

Eurypedus is a genus of leaf beetles of the family Chrysomelidae.

== Species ==
- Eurypedus nigrosignatus (Boheman, 1854)
- Eurypedus peltoides Boheman, 1854
- Eurypedus thoni Barber, 1946
