= Cistudinella obducta =

Scientific classification
- Kingdom: Animalia
- Phylum: Arthropoda
- Clade: Pancrustacea
- Class: Insecta
- Order: Coleoptera
- Suborder: Polyphaga
- Infraorder: Cucujiformia
- Family: Chrysomelidae
- Genus: Cistudinella
- Species: C. obducta

Binomial name
- Cistudinella obducta (Boheman, 1854)

Synonyms
- Chelymorpha obducta Boheman, 1854

Species of beetle

Cistudinella obducta is a species of beetle of the family Chrysomelidae. It is found in Argentina, Bolivia, Brazil (Distrito Federal, Mato Grosso, Mato Grosso do Sul, Minas Gerais, Pará, Paraná, Rio Grande do Sul, Rondônia, Pernambuco, Santa Catarina), Paraguay, Peru and Venezuela.

== Life history ==
The recorded host plant is Cordia longipeda.
