= Physonota arizonae =

Scientific classification
- Kingdom: Animalia
- Phylum: Arthropoda
- Class: Insecta
- Order: Coleoptera
- Suborder: Polyphaga
- Infraorder: Cucujiformia
- Family: Chrysomelidae
- Genus: Physonota
- Species: P. arizonae

Binomial name
- Physonota arizonae Schaeffer, 1925

Species of beetle

Physonota arizonae, commonly known as the Arizona tortoise beetle or canyon ragweed tortoise beetle, is a species of leaf beetle in the family Chrysomelidae. It is found in Central America and North America.
