= Cistudinella notata =

Scientific classification
- Kingdom: Animalia
- Phylum: Arthropoda
- Clade: Pancrustacea
- Class: Insecta
- Order: Coleoptera
- Suborder: Polyphaga
- Infraorder: Cucujiformia
- Family: Chrysomelidae
- Genus: Cistudinella
- Species: C. notata

Binomial name
- Cistudinella notata (Boheman, 1854)

Synonyms
- Chelymorpha notata Boheman, 1854

Species of beetle

Cistudinella notata is a species of beetle of the family Chrysomelidae. It is found in Argentina, Brazil (Bahia, Minas Gerais, Paraná, Rio de Janeiro, Rio Grande do Sul, Santa Catarina, Pernambuco, São Paulo) and Paraguay.
