= List of lighthouses in the Cayman Islands =

This is a list of lighthouses in the Cayman Islands.

== Lighthouses ==
Name	Image	Year built	Location & coordinates	Class of Light	Focal height	NGA number	Admiralty number	Range nml
Boatswain Lighthouse	Image	1930s	West Bay; 19°23′08.0″N 81°24′49.2″W	L Fl W 15s.	6 metres (20 ft)	13720	J5222	15
Cayman Brac East Point Lighthouse		1930s	Cayman Brac; 19°45′04.0″N 79°43′24.9″W	Fl W 20s.	46 metres (151 ft)	13748	J5240	12
Gorling Bluff Lighthouse		1937	Grand Cayman; 19°18′07.0″N 81°05′57.0″W	Fl (2) W 20s.	8 metres (26 ft)	13724	J5226	12
Grand Cayman Lighthouse	Image	1980	Grand Cayman; 19°17′47.4″N 81°22′59.3″W	Q R	6 metres (20 ft)	13716	J5232	6
Little Cayman Lighthouse	Image	n/a	Little Cayman; 19°39′30.0″N 80°06′30.0″W	Fl W 5s.	6 metres (20 ft)	13736	J5238	10
Little Cayman East Point Lighthouse		n/a	Little Cayman; 19°42′27.0″N 79°57′47.9″W	Fl (2) W 15s.	11 metres (36 ft)	13740	J5237	10

== See also ==
- Lists of lighthouses and lightvessels
