= East End Light =

East End Light Gorling Bluff Light
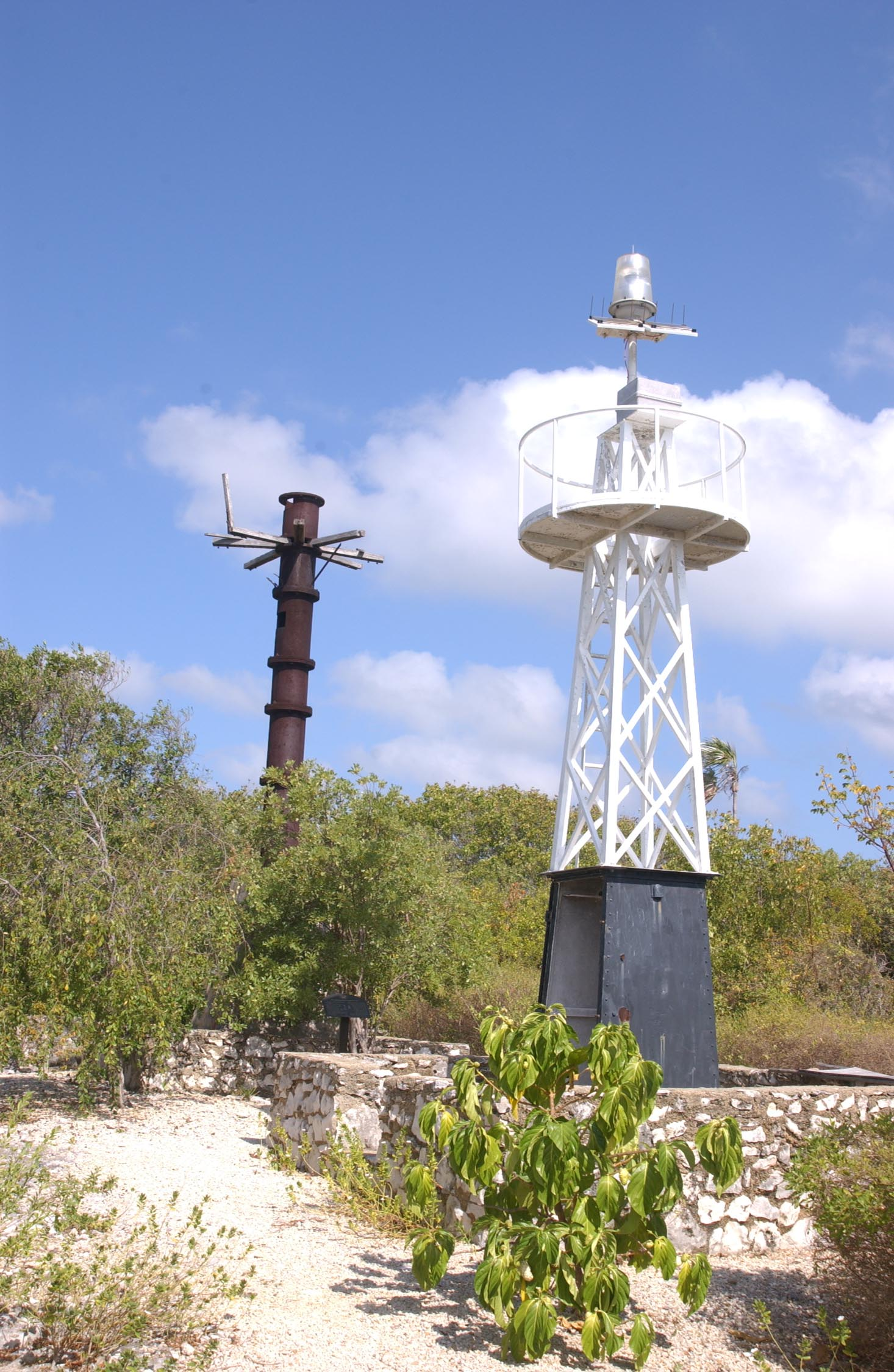
- Location: East End; Grand Cayman; Cayman Islands
- Coordinates: 19°18′00″N 81°06′00″W

Tower
- Constructed: 1900 (original tower); 1937 (current tower)
- Construction: steel skeletal tower
- Automated: 1937 (current tower)
- Height: 8 metres (26 ft)
- Shape: square tower with balcony and beacon
- Markings: white tower, black base tower
- Operator: National Trust for the Cayman Islands

Light
- First lit: 1937 (current tower)
- Focal height: 22 metres (72 ft)
- Range: 12 nautical miles (22 km; 14 mi)
- Characteristic: Fl (2) W 20s.

The East End Light (sometimes called Gorling Bluff Light) is a lighthouse located at the east end of Grand Cayman island in the Cayman Islands. The lighthouse is the centerpiece of East End Lighthouse Park, managed by the National Trust for the Cayman Islands; the first navigational aid on the site was the first lighthouse in the Cayman Islands.

== History ==
The east end of Grand Cayman has long been well known for the treacherous reefs which lie under the ocean's surface just off its coast, and was in the past known as the "Graveyard of the Caribbean". The area was the site of the island's most famous shipwreck, the Wreck of the Ten Sail, in 1794; miraculously, only eight lives were lost in the disaster when ten merchant vessels ran aground in rough seas. The area was sparsely inhabited at the time, but local residents banded together with some inhabitants of Bodden Town to assist the crews of the wrecked ships.

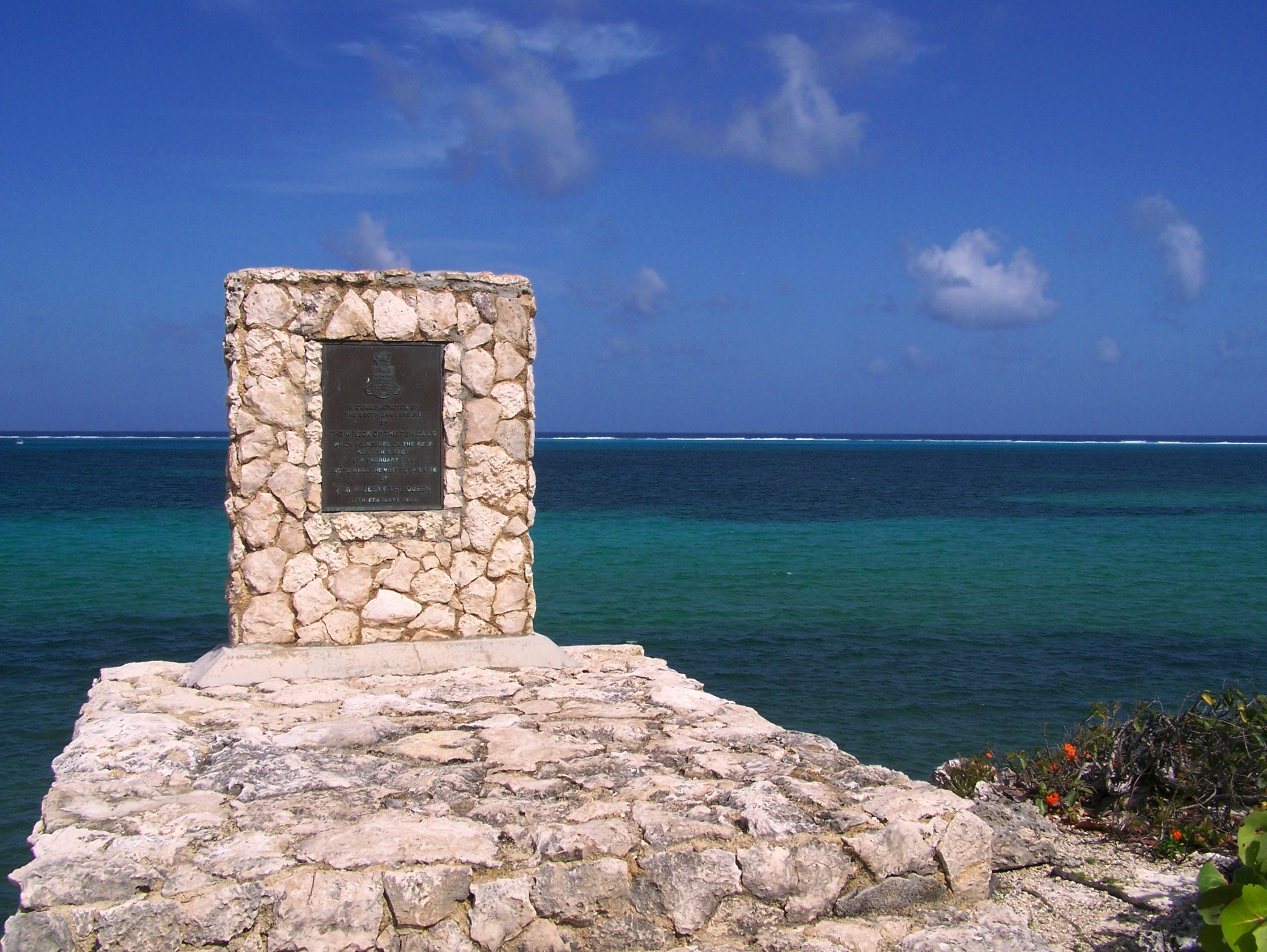
Memorial plaque commemorating Wreck of the Ten Sail as dedicated by Queen Elizabeth II in 1994

By the end of the nineteenth century, Eastern Channel in Gun Bay was designated a port of entry for the East End area. Much business was conducted there; the channel was trafficked by ships leaving and arriving on fishing and turtling trips, and by freight- and mail-carrying vessels as well.

The first lighthouse for the East End was erected about a half-mile away from the site of the present tower, being built on Gun Bluff in the early twentieth century. It was one of two lighthouses built on the island; the other was constructed in George Town at about the same time. The structure consisted of a steel ship's mast, 60 feet (18 m) tall, standing on the bluff. William James Watler served as the first keeper, ensuring that a kerosene lantern was hoisted to the top of the mast at 6:00 every evening and bringing it down at 6:00 every morning. A fine "not exceeding forty shillings" would be levied on him should he be derelict in his duties. This first lighthouse was visible from ten miles out at sea.

It was recognized by 1918 that a more substantial lighthouse was needed for the point, and a French engineer named Terrier was appointed to plan the project. Land at Gorling Bluff was leased, and a new structure was built, along with a shed for holding kerosene. The new site was perfect for a lighthouse, commanding as it did a good view of nearby reefs; it was also the highest point in the district. The new structure was a cylindrical steel mast supporting a wooden frame; this held a three-wick kerosene lamp. Two keepers, Austin B. Conolly and Police Officer Captain Elliott Conolly, were appointed to oversee maintenance and lighting of the light. Remnants of this lighthouse may still be seen standing beside the current tower, while its kerosene lamp is now in the Cayman Islands National Museum.

With the completion, in 1935, of the coastal road along Grand Cayman's southern coast, the community around East End ceased to be as isolated as it had traditionally been, and it was no longer used as a port of entry. As a consequence, the old lighthouse was deemed less necessary, as it was easier to access the village by land. The tower remained in use until 1937, when the British government provided five "navigational lights" of modern design to be scattered among the three Cayman Islands. It was required that these were to be erected on Crown Property, so as a consequence Gorling Bluff was acquired by the British government that same year; the light was placed on the bluff by a Mr. Morell, who came from England to perform the job.

The first lights in the new structure were automatic, controlled by the sun, and could be left for up to six months; as a consequence, the employment of light keepers was no longer deemed necessary. As World War II began, it was decided that the site would be worth turning into a lookout post, and guardians of the light were assigned for this purpose. They also served as lookouts until hostilities erupted, at which point the light came under the jurisdiction of local police. Albert Connor remained in charge until the formation, in June 1942, of the islands' Home Guard. The Guard maintained a 24-hour coastal watch along Grand Cayman's coasts, and a four-man team, commanded by a corporal, was stationed at East End. Although they were trained, they were rarely armed, instead using powerful binoculars to scan the area. The men were given a small barracks, containing a bunkroom, kitchen, and outside latrine as quarters, and had a telephone line connecting them directly with the central office in George Town, to which they reported every half-hour.

The East End Light remains an active aid to navigation, being administered for that purpose by the Cayman Islands' Port Authority; today it is powered by solar energy. The Authority has allowed the National Trust for the Cayman Islands to do some work around the structure to make the site more presentable. A stairway of thirty-seven steps has been installed leading to the summit of the bluff, and large amounts of infill and soil have been taken up to create pathways for visitors. Flower beds show examples of various plants which were used as medicines by the Islands' earliest settlers, and a thousand-gallon water tank has been installed to provide irrigation. As of 2006, work on the park was ongoing.

== See also ==
- List of lighthouses in the Cayman Islands
