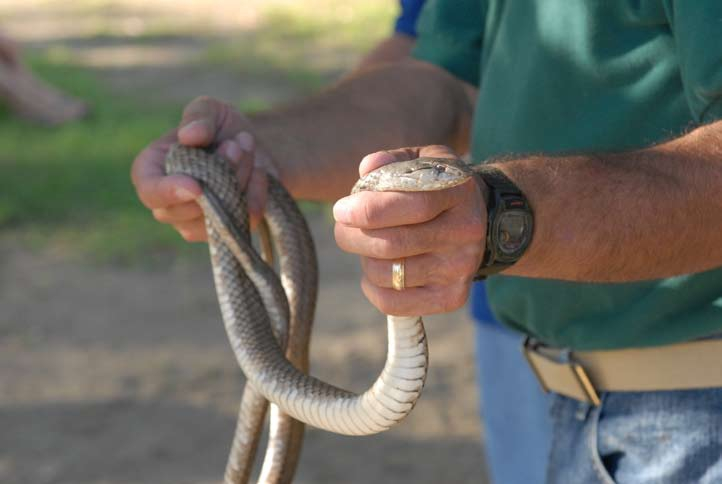
- Cubophis cantherigerus

Scientific classification
- Kingdom: Animalia
- Phylum: Chordata
- Class: Reptilia
- Order: Squamata
- Suborder: Serpentes
- Family: Colubridae
- Subfamily: Dipsadinae
- Genus: Cubophis; Hedges et al., 2009

= Cubophis =

Genus of snakes

Cubophis is a genus of snakes in the family Colubridae. They are found in the northwestern Caribbean.

== Species ==
The following six species are recognized as being valid.

- Cubophis brooksi (Barbour, 1914) - Little Swan Island, Honduras - Swan Island racer
- Cubophis cantherigerus (Bibron, 1843) - Cuba, Bahamas (Cay Sal Bank) - Cuban racer
- Cubophis caymanus (Garman, 1887) - Grand Cayman, Cayman Islands - Grand Cayman racer
- Cubophis fuscicauda (Garman, 1888) - Cayman Brac, Cayman Islands - Cayman Brac racer
- Cubophis ruttyi (Grant, 1941) - Little Cayman, Cayman Islands - Little Cayman racer
- Cubophis vudii (Cope, 1862) - Bahamas - Bahamian racer
