= Eurypedus peltoides =

Scientific classification
- Kingdom: Animalia
- Phylum: Arthropoda
- Clade: Pancrustacea
- Class: Insecta
- Order: Coleoptera
- Suborder: Polyphaga
- Infraorder: Cucujiformia
- Family: Chrysomelidae
- Genus: Eurypedus
- Species: E. peltoides

Binomial name
- Eurypedus peltoides (Boheman, 1854)

Synonyms
- Ischyrosonyx peltoides Boheman, 1854

Species of beetle

Eurypedus peltoides is a species of beetle of the family Chrysomelidae. It is found in Argentina, Bolivia, Brazil (Bahia, Espírito Santo, Minas Gerais, Paraná, Rio de Janeiro, Rio Grande do Sul, Pernambuco, São Paulo) and Paraguay.
