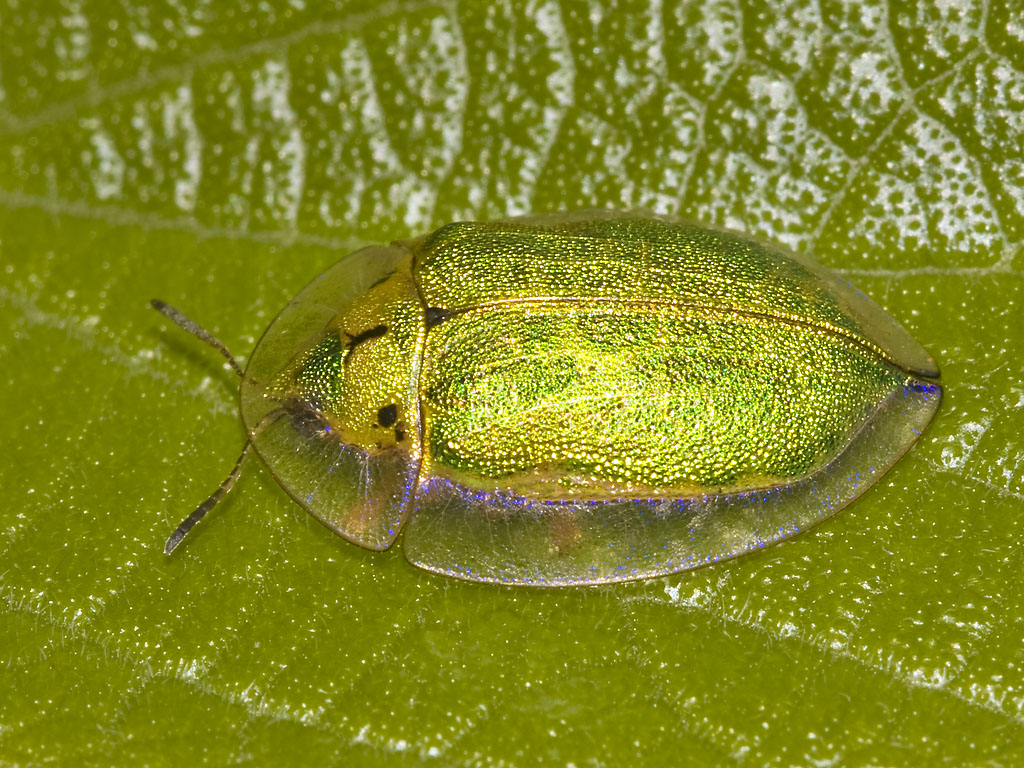
- P. helianthi in San Luis Potosí City, Mexico

Scientific classification
- Kingdom: Animalia
- Phylum: Arthropoda
- Class: Insecta
- Order: Coleoptera
- Suborder: Polyphaga
- Infraorder: Cucujiformia
- Family: Chrysomelidae
- Genus: Physonota
- Species: P. helianthi

Binomial name
- Physonota helianthi (Randall, 1838)

= Physonota helianthi =

Species of beetle

Physonota helianthi, the sunflower tortoise beetle, is a species of leaf beetle in the family Chrysomelidae. It is found in North America.
