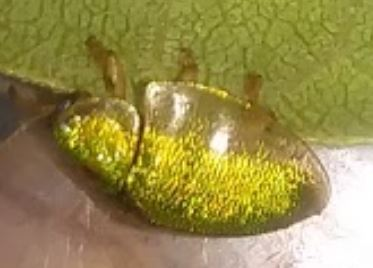

Scientific classification
- Kingdom: Animalia
- Phylum: Arthropoda
- Clade: Pancrustacea
- Class: Insecta
- Order: Coleoptera
- Suborder: Polyphaga
- Infraorder: Cucujiformia
- Family: Chrysomelidae
- Genus: Eurypepla
- Species: E. calochroma

Binomial name
- Eurypepla calochroma Blake, 1965

Synonyms
- Physonota calochroma (Blake, 1965); Physonota calochroma calochroma (Blake, 1965)

= Eurypepla calochroma =

Geiger tortoise beetle

Species of beetle

Eurypepla calochroma, commonly known as the Geiger tortoise beetle, is a species of tortoise beetle. It is found in Florida, Central America and the Caribbean. This specific beetle only feeds on the Geiger tree (Cordia sebastena) throughout all of its life stages.

== Description ==
The Geiger tortoise beetle is a small (about one centimeter long) beetle. The biology has been described Larvae are small, brown, slimy, and worm like and have an accumulation of feces on the abdomen. Pupae are shell-like, and when the adult emerges from the pupal stage they come out as a round-shaped beetle that is overall yellowish. But, as adults mature, they become a bright iridescent green color. Mature adults can change color from their normal green color to blues, purples, yellows, and browns based on light levels.

== Habitat and distribution ==
This beetle can be found in Southern Florida from Palm Beach to Miami-Dade and Monroe Counties, in the Bahamas and smaller Caribbean islands, Central America. They live in areas where Geiger trees (Cordia sebastena) are found, such as open woodlands, grasslands, wetlands, and even gardens.

== Behavior ==
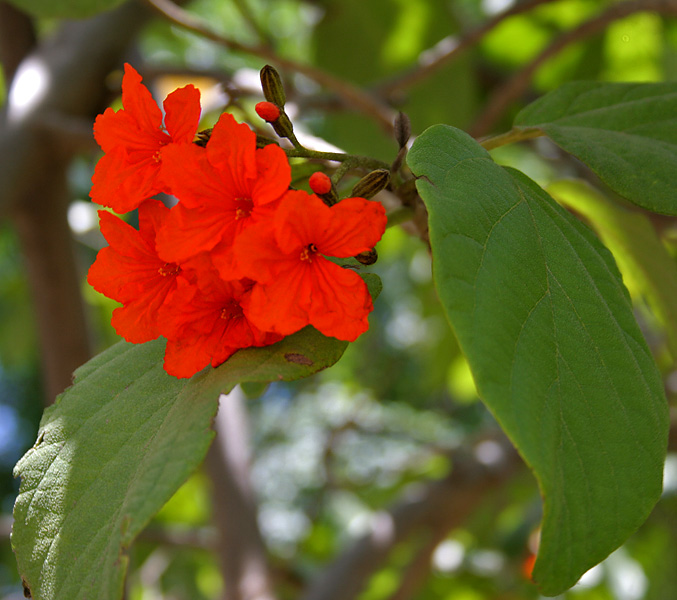
Geiger tree, the food source of these beetles.

=== Behavior in Larvae ===
Larvae face their fecal shield up at potential predators to deter them and to use them as an umbrella to protect their fragile bodies. Larvae eat the leaves, fruit, and flowers of the Geiger tree.

=== Behavior in Adults ===
Adults eat the leaves, fruit, and flowers of the Geiger tree. Adults live on and crawl around these trees and often fly from tree to tree. They often hide and sleep under the leaves, where their green color provides the best camouflage. Some strange behaviors have been noted and studied by researchers at Florida Atlantic University High School. To startle predators, they will vibrate their heads up and down against a neck collar at high frequencies that make buzzing noises.
