= Orexita =

Scientific classification
- Kingdom: Animalia
- Phylum: Arthropoda
- Clade: Pancrustacea
- Class: Insecta
- Order: Coleoptera
- Suborder: Polyphaga
- Infraorder: Cucujiformia
- Family: Chrysomelidae
- Subfamily: Cassidinae
- Tribe: Ischyrosonychini
- Genus: Orexita; Spaeth, 1911

Genus of leaf beetles

Orexita is a genus of leaf beetles of the family Chrysomelidae.

== Species ==
- Orexita bifenestra (Boheman, 1855)
- Orexita blanchardi (Boheman, 1855)
- Orexita blattoides Spaeth, 1911
- Orexita boliviana Spaeth, 1919
- Orexita complanata (Boheman, 1855)
- Orexita cruentata (Olivier, 1808)
- Orexita dolorosa Spaeth, 1935
- Orexita justini (Boheman, 1855)
- Orexita lucasi (Boheman, 1855)
- Orexita maura (Boheman, 1855)
- Orexita minima Borowiec & Swietojanska, 1997
- Orexita picta (Boheman, 1855)
- Orexita plagipennis Spaeth, 1911
- Orexita postica (Boheman, 1855)
- Orexita sapida Spaeth, 1935
- Orexita speculata (Boheman, 1862)
- Orexita subgibbosa Spaeth, 1911
- Orexita subopaca Spaeth, 1919
- Orexita suggesta Spaeth, 1928
- Orexita tripartita (Champion, 1894)
- Orexita varians (Guérin-Méneville, 1844)
- Orexita wagneri (Boheman, 1862)
- Orexita woytkowskii Borowiec, 1992
