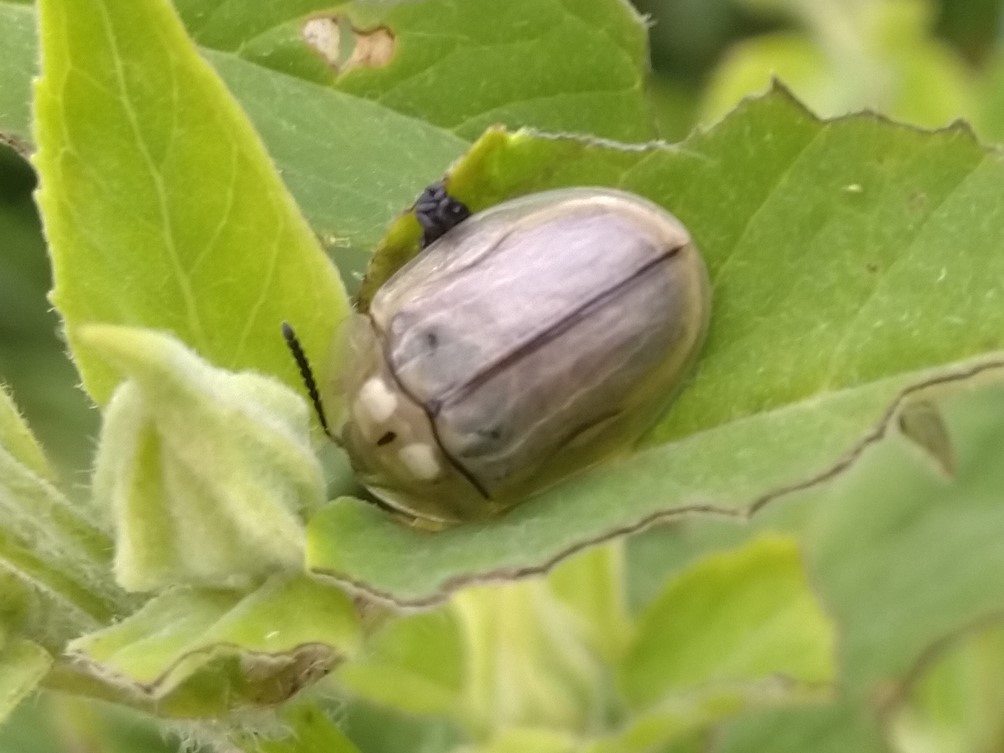

Scientific classification
- Kingdom: Animalia
- Phylum: Arthropoda
- Class: Insecta
- Order: Coleoptera
- Suborder: Polyphaga
- Infraorder: Cucujiformia
- Family: Chrysomelidae
- Genus: Physonota
- Species: P. unipunctata

Binomial name
- Physonota unipunctata (Say, 1824)

= Physonota unipunctata =

Species of beetle

Physonota unipunctata, known generally as horsemint tortoise beetle, is a species of leaf beetle in the family Chrysomelidae. Other common names include the beebalm tortoise beetle, bergamot tortoise beetle, and one-spotted tortoise beetle. It is found in North America.

== Subspecies ==
These two subspecies belong to the species Physonota unipunctata:

- Physonota unipunctata arizonae Schaeffer
- Physonota unipunctata unipunctata
