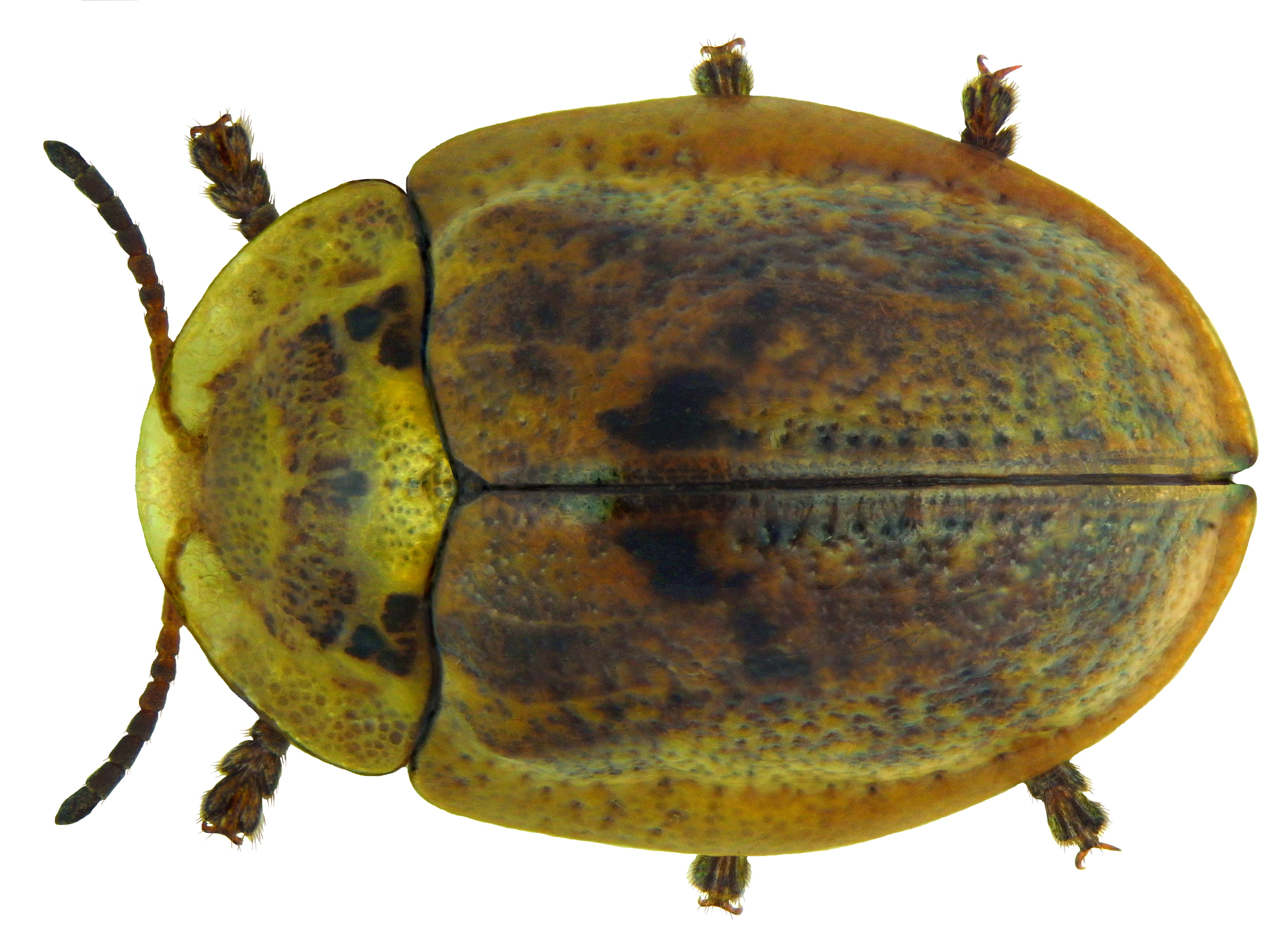
- Physonota alutacea

Scientific classification
- Kingdom: Animalia
- Phylum: Arthropoda
- Clade: Pancrustacea
- Class: Insecta
- Order: Coleoptera
- Suborder: Polyphaga
- Infraorder: Cucujiformia
- Family: Chrysomelidae
- Tribe: Ischyrosonychini
- Genus: Physonota; Boheman, 1854

= Physonota =

Genus of beetles

Physonota is a genus of tortoise beetles and hispines in the family Chrysomelidae. There are more than 40 described species in Physonota.

== Species ==
These 41 species belong to the genus Physonota:

- Physonota alutacea Boheman, 1854 (wild olive tortoise beetle)
- Physonota arizonae Schaeffer, 1925 (Arizona tortoise beetle)
- Physonota attenuata Boheman, 1854
- Physonota breviuscula Boheman, 1856
- Physonota calcarata (Boheman, 1854)
- Physonota caudata Boheman, 1854
- Physonota cerea Boheman, 1854
- Physonota citrina Boheman, 1854
- Physonota citrinella Boheman, 1854
- Physonota convexa Borowiec, 1995
- Physonota dilatata Kirsch, 1876
- Physonota disjuncta (Chevrolat, 1834)
- Physonota eucalypta Boheman, 1862
- Physonota flavago Boheman, 1854
- Physonota gigantea Boheman, 1854
- Physonota helianthi (Randall, 1838) (sunflower tortoise beetle)
- Physonota humilis Boheman, 1856
- Physonota incrustata Boheman, 1854
- Physonota limoniata Boheman, 1862
- Physonota lutarella Boheman, 1856
- Physonota maculiventris Boheman, 1854
- Physonota mexicana Boheman, 1854
- Physonota nitidicollis Boheman, 1854
- Physonota ovalis Boheman, 1854
- Physonota ovipennis Champion, 1894
- Physonota pacifica Spaeth, 1932
- Physonota pellucida Wagener, 1877
- Physonota perampla Champion, 1894
- Physonota picticollis Boheman, 1854
- Physonota plana Boheman, 1854
- Physonota puncticollis Borowiec, 1995
- Physonota quinquepunctata Walsh & Riley
- Physonota separata Boheman, 1854
- Physonota stigmatilis Boheman, 1854
- Physonota sublaevigata Spaeth, 1915
- Physonota translucida Boheman, 1854
- Physonota turgida Boheman, 1854
- Physonota unipunctata (Say, 1824) (horsemint tortoise beetle)
- Physonota vitticollis Boheman, 1854
- Physonota vittifera Spaeth, 1915
