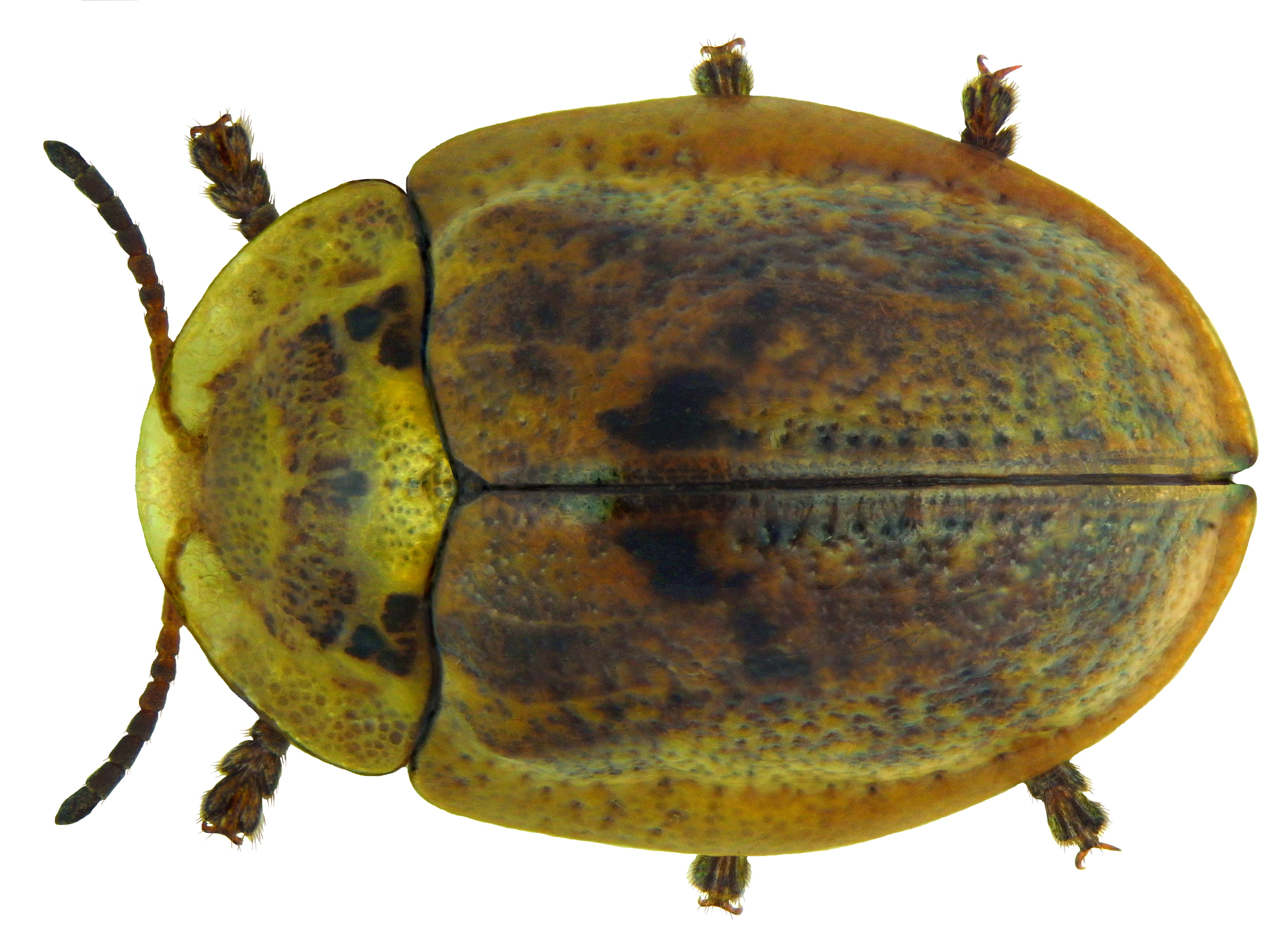

Scientific classification
- Kingdom: Animalia
- Phylum: Arthropoda
- Class: Insecta
- Order: Coleoptera
- Suborder: Polyphaga
- Infraorder: Cucujiformia
- Family: Chrysomelidae
- Genus: Physonota
- Species: P. alutacea

Binomial name
- Physonota alutacea Boheman, 1854

= Physonota alutacea =

Species of beetle

Physonota alutacea, the wild olive tortoise beetle, is a species of leaf beetle in the family Chrysomelidae. It is found in Central America, North America, and South America.
