= Eurypepla =

Scientific classification
- Kingdom: Animalia
- Phylum: Arthropoda
- Clade: Pancrustacea
- Class: Insecta
- Order: Coleoptera
- Suborder: Polyphaga
- Infraorder: Cucujiformia
- Family: Chrysomelidae
- Tribe: Ischyrosonychini
- Genus: Eurypepla; Boheman, 1854

Genus of beetles

Eurypepla is a genus of tortoise beetles and hispines in the family Chrysomelidae. There are at least four described species in Eurypepla.

== Species ==
These four species belong to the genus Eurypepla:

- Eurypepla brevilineata Boheman, 1854^{i c g}
- Eurypepla calochroma (Blake, 1965)^{i c g}
- Eurypepla jamaicensis (Linnaeus, 1758)^{i c g}
- Eurypepla vitrea Boheman, 1854^{i c g}

Data sources: i = ITIS, c = Catalogue of Life, g = GBIF, b = Bugguide.net
