= Old Savannah School House =

Artifact in Cayman Islands

Coordinates: 19.2722°N 81.3000°W

The Old Savannah School House is a historic one-room schoolhouse in Grand Cayman, Cayman Islands. Initially opened in 1940, it is operated nowadays as a museum by the National Trust for the Cayman Islands.

== Construction ==
The building is supported by ironwood posts, between which walls of concrete were poured. Sinking the posts turned out to be a difficult job during construction, as the structure was to be constructed on a bed of dolomite. Eventually, a method of softening the dolomite with fire was tried and found successful, allowing work to continue.

== History ==
Education in the Cayman Islands was a spotty affair up until the 1920s, and many students were homeschooled for the duration of their youth. Churches eventually took over some educational responsibilities, and a few private schools were built, but it was not until the early twentieth century that the government decided upon a more regulated program.

Before the Savannah Schoolhouse was built, the nearest schools to which children could be sent were in Spotts and Caswell. The 1932 Cuba Hurricane, which passed directly over the islands, obliterated the former, and soon after the local population began moving towards Newlands, Savannah, and Crewe Road. Savannah in particular was a heavily growing community, and it was soon decided that the settlement needed a school to better serve its children. Construction of the school was performed by a team of local craftsmen under the direction of Head Carpenter Will Wallace Bodden. Sand for the site came from Spotts Beach; other materials, as needed, were transported from George Town. The schoolhouse was completed in 1940, opening its doors to pupils for the first time on September 12 of that year. The Education Report described it as being "adequate in size ... an asset to the district ... (which) filled a long felt need to this small community, the cost being about 250 pounds".

Children from seven to fourteen all studied in the same room; discipline was strict, and singing and sports were also popular. The basic curriculum also covered reading, writing, arithmetic, history, geography, science, religious education, and ethics. For many pupils, their formal education ended when they left the school; some were able to take the Jamaica Local Exam, while others were able to go on to higher education in Jamaica, the United States, and the United Kingdom.

The schoolhouse remained in use for 41 years before being replaced by a new, more modern, and more spacious building now located directly behind it; the old school was then used as a storage space for furniture and supplies. Eventually it was decided to demolish the old structure, which saddened former pupils, and a drive to save it began. This coincided with the creation, in 1987, of the National Trust for the Cayman Islands, and the local district committee decided that restoration of the old school would be a good project with which to begin. The Old Savannah Schoolhouse was the first building whose restoration and refitting were overseen by the National Trust; it initially opened as a museum in 1995, and further restoration was undertaken in 2004. Today it has been furnished with replica 1950s-era desks, benches, and hat racks, and displays textbooks, reports, and needlework as well as a copy of the school uniform. The museum is currently open by appointment only.
