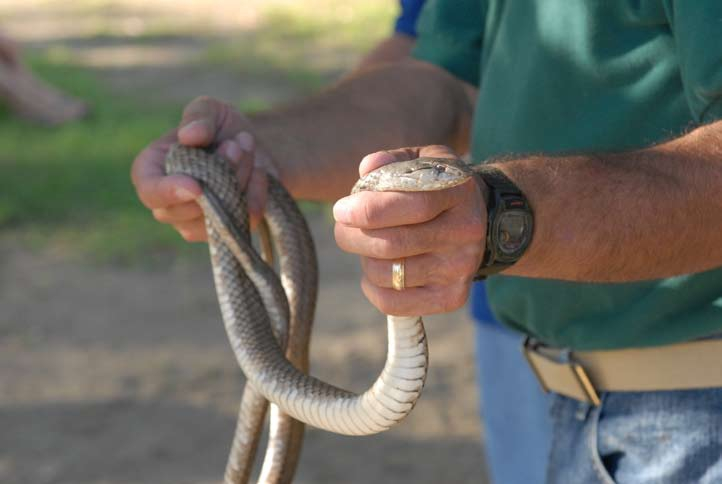

Conservation status
- Least Concern (IUCN 3.1)

Scientific classification
- Kingdom: Animalia
- Phylum: Chordata
- Class: Reptilia
- Order: Squamata
- Suborder: Serpentes
- Family: Colubridae
- Genus: Cubophis
- Species: C. cantherigerus

Binomial name
- Cubophis cantherigerus (Bibron, 1843)

= Cubophis cantherigerus =

Species of snake

Cubophis cantherigerus, the Cuban racer, is a species of snake in the family Colubridae. The species is native to Cuba and The Bahamas.
