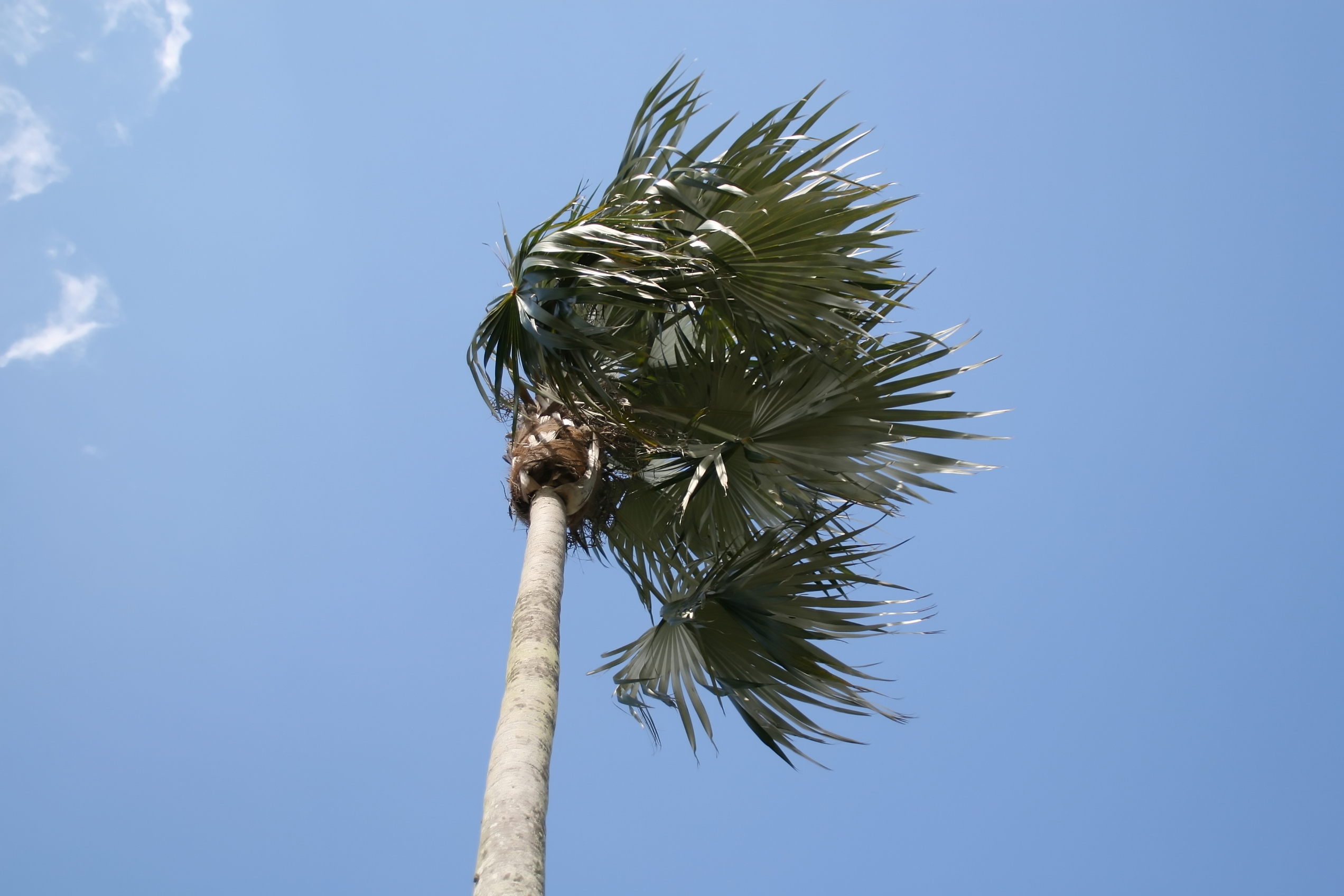

Conservation status
- Endangered (IUCN 3.1)

Scientific classification
- Kingdom: Plantae
- Clade: Tracheophytes
- Clade: Angiosperms
- Clade: Monocots
- Clade: Commelinids
- Order: Arecales
- Family: Arecaceae
- Genus: Coccothrinax
- Species: C. proctorii

Binomial name
- Coccothrinax proctorii Read, 1980

= Coccothrinax proctorii =

Species of palm

Coccothrinax proctorii, the Cayman thatch palm or Proctor's silver palm, is a palm which is endemic to the Cayman Islands.

Henderson and colleagues (1995) considered C. proctorii to be a synonym of Coccothrinax argentata.

== Description ==
A medium-sized palm, with a slender trunk, and an open crown, of deeply divided leaves, with nearly perfectly symmetrical divisions, dark green above, and silvery white below. The trunk type is solitary.

== Horticulture ==
It prefers a sunny, moist, but well-drained position. It is salt tolerant, and prefers an alkaline soil with a position in full sun, or light shade, in a tropical or subtropical climate, and once established, can endure quite a bit of coastal exposure. While slow growing, it can be grown on just coral limerock. Indoors it also makes a neat bonsai, that can even be cultivated just on a piece of coral limerock, practically without soil.

== Conservation ==
It is considered Endangered by the IUCN Red List, having declined to about 435,699 mature individuals in 2000 from a projected original population of 600,000. This population has still continued declining, and the projected 2013 population is around 428,500 mature individuals. In a century, the population will have likely declined to only about 123,500 individuals, all restricted to protected areas.
