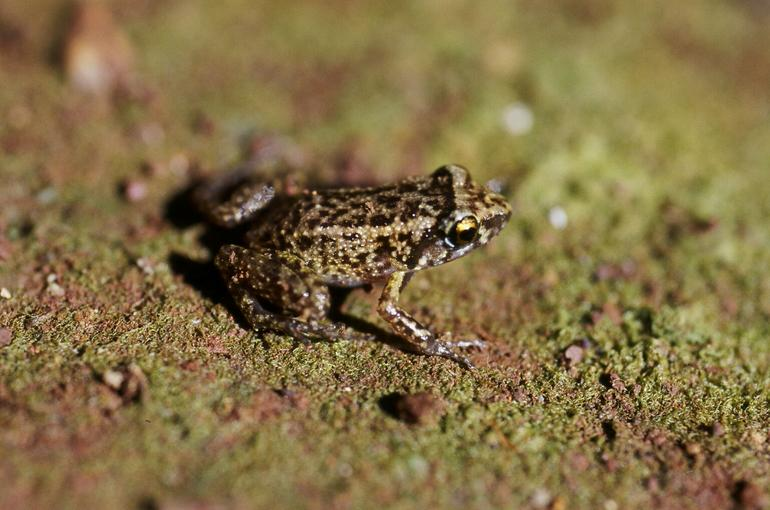

Conservation status
- Least Concern (IUCN 3.1)

Scientific classification
- Kingdom: Animalia
- Phylum: Chordata
- Class: Amphibia
- Order: Anura
- Family: Eleutherodactylidae
- Genus: Eleutherodactylus
- Species: E. planirostris

Binomial name
- Eleutherodactylus planirostris (Cope, 1862)

Synonyms
- Eleutherodactylus planirostris ssp. casparii (Schwartz, 1965)

= Greenhouse frog =

Species of amphibian

The greenhouse frog (Eleutherodactylus planirostris) is a species of frog in the family Eleutherodactylidae, native to Cuba, the Bahamas, and the Cayman Islands, and it has been introduced to other areas, such as Florida, Hawaii, Guam, Hong Kong and Shenzhen.

== Description ==
The greenhouse frog is a very small species, ranging from 17 to 31 mm (0.67 to 1.22 in) in length. These frogs are usually drab or olive-brown in colour, and occur in two forms; one has two broad stripes running longitudinally down the back, and the other is mottled. The undersides of both are a paler colour than the back, and the eyes are red.

== Distribution and habitat ==
The greenhouse frog is native to Cuba and some other islands in the West Indies. It has been introduced to Hawaii and Florida, where it has become common. It has been sporadically found in southern Georgia, southern Alabama and eastern Louisiana. It is an introduced species in Jamaica, Guam and Shenzhen, China. It lives in moist leaf litter, often near human habitations, but is seldom seen because it is nocturnal. It sometimes emerges on warm, rainy days in summer, and in Florida, it has been found hibernating in March under the flaking bark of a wild tamarind (Lysiloma) tree.

== Diet ==
The diet of the greenhouse frog consists of small invertebrates, such as ants, beetles, mites, spiders, and roaches.

== Reproduction ==
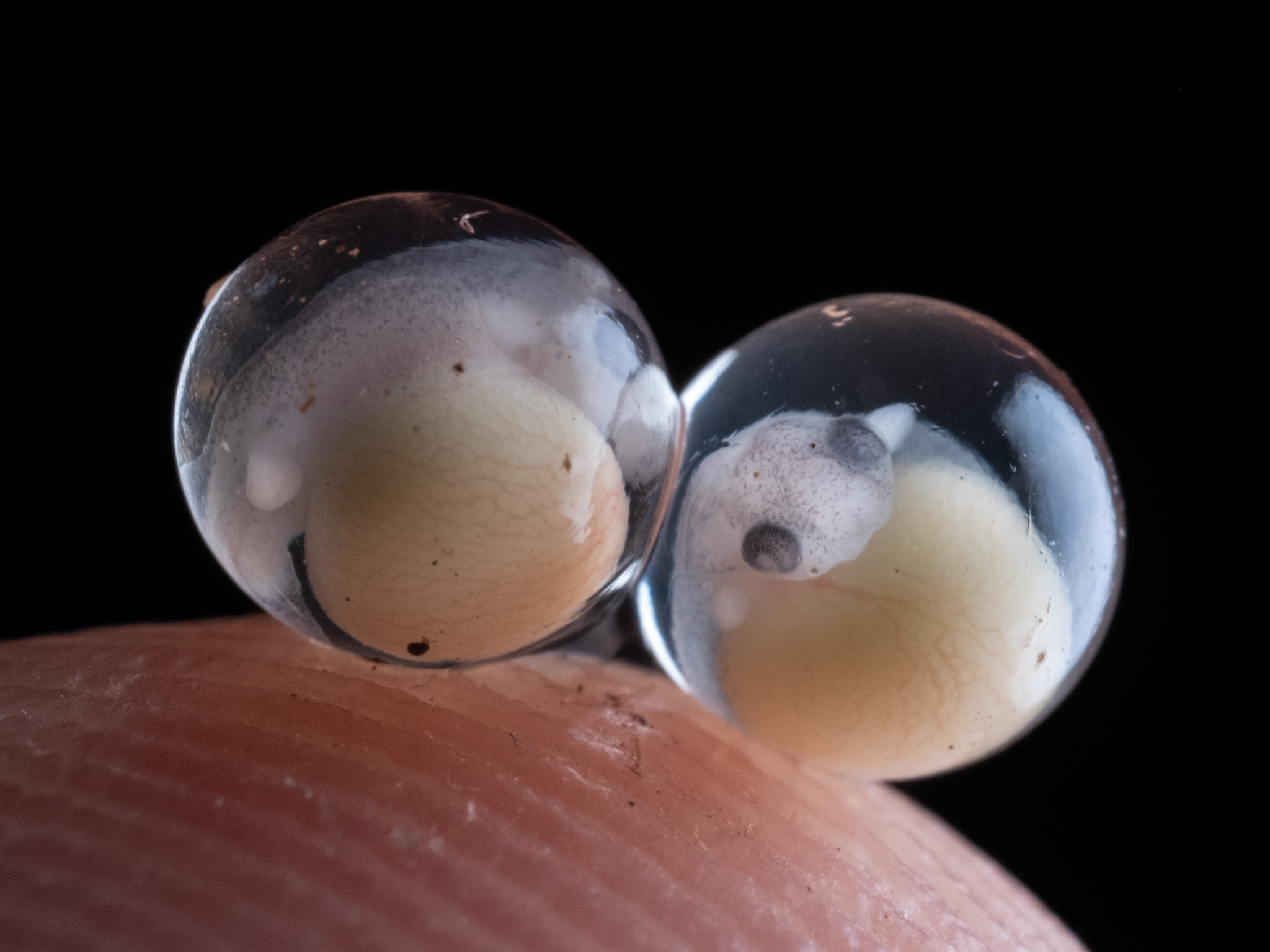
Greenhouse frog embryos in transparent egg casings

The greenhouse frog is unusual in that its eggs are not laid in water or in a frothy mass as is the case in some tree frogs. Instead, the eggs are enclosed in a thick membrane and laid singly in concealed, damp locations, such as beneath a log, buried in debris, or even under a flower pot. Clutch sizes vary between three and 26 eggs in Florida. They pass through their tadpole stage while still in the egg, and emerge as fully developed juvenile frogs about 5 mm (0.20 in) long with a short tail that soon gets reabsorbed. In warm conditions, hatching may occur on the 13th day of development. The tadpoles have an "egg tooth" on the end of their snouts to help them to emerge from the egg case. Afterwards, this is no longer of use, so is shed. The adult frog may provide some parental care by guarding the eggs, as frogs have been observed lurking in the vicinity of egg clumps.
