= Bodden Town Mission House, Grand Cayman =

Coordinates: 19.27920°N 81.25142°W

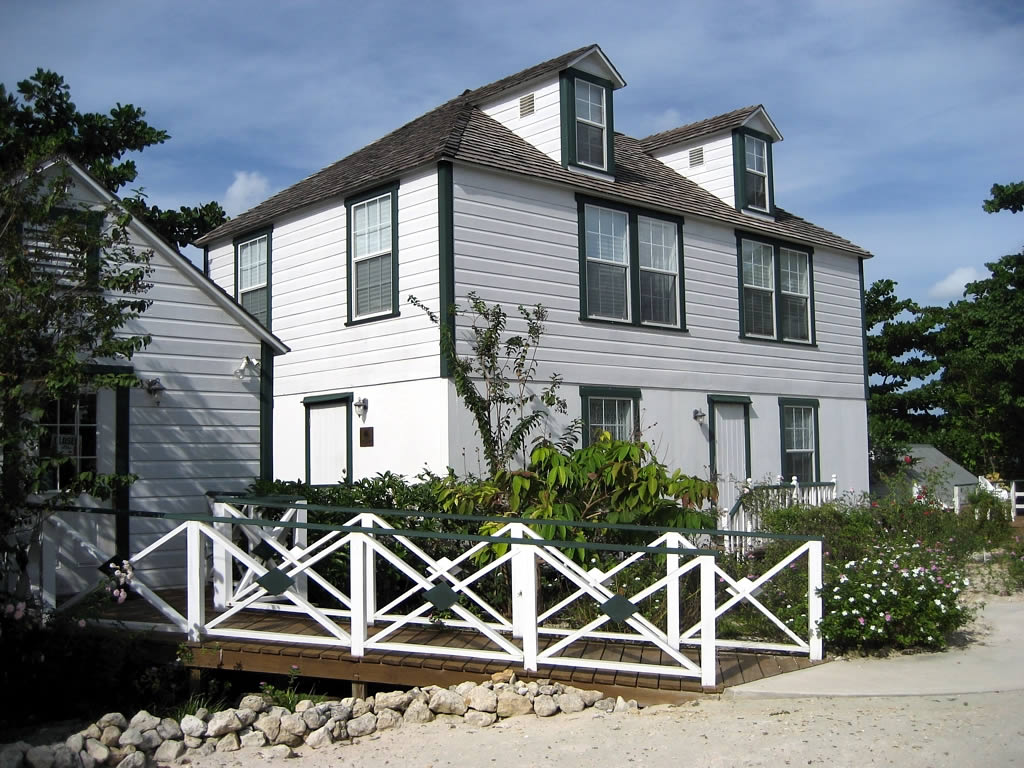
Bodden Town Mission House, Grand Cayman

The Mission House is a historic house located in Bodden Town, Grand Cayman.

The house was built in the 1700s by settlers and became known as became known as the "Mission House" in the 1800s because of early missionaries, teachers, and families who lived there while establishing a Presbyterian church and school in Bodden Town.

Currently, the site is a tourist attraction with the house containing artifacts known to have been used by the Watler family. There is also a gift shop on site.
