= Mastic Reserve =

Coordinates: 19°19′00″N 81°11′00″W

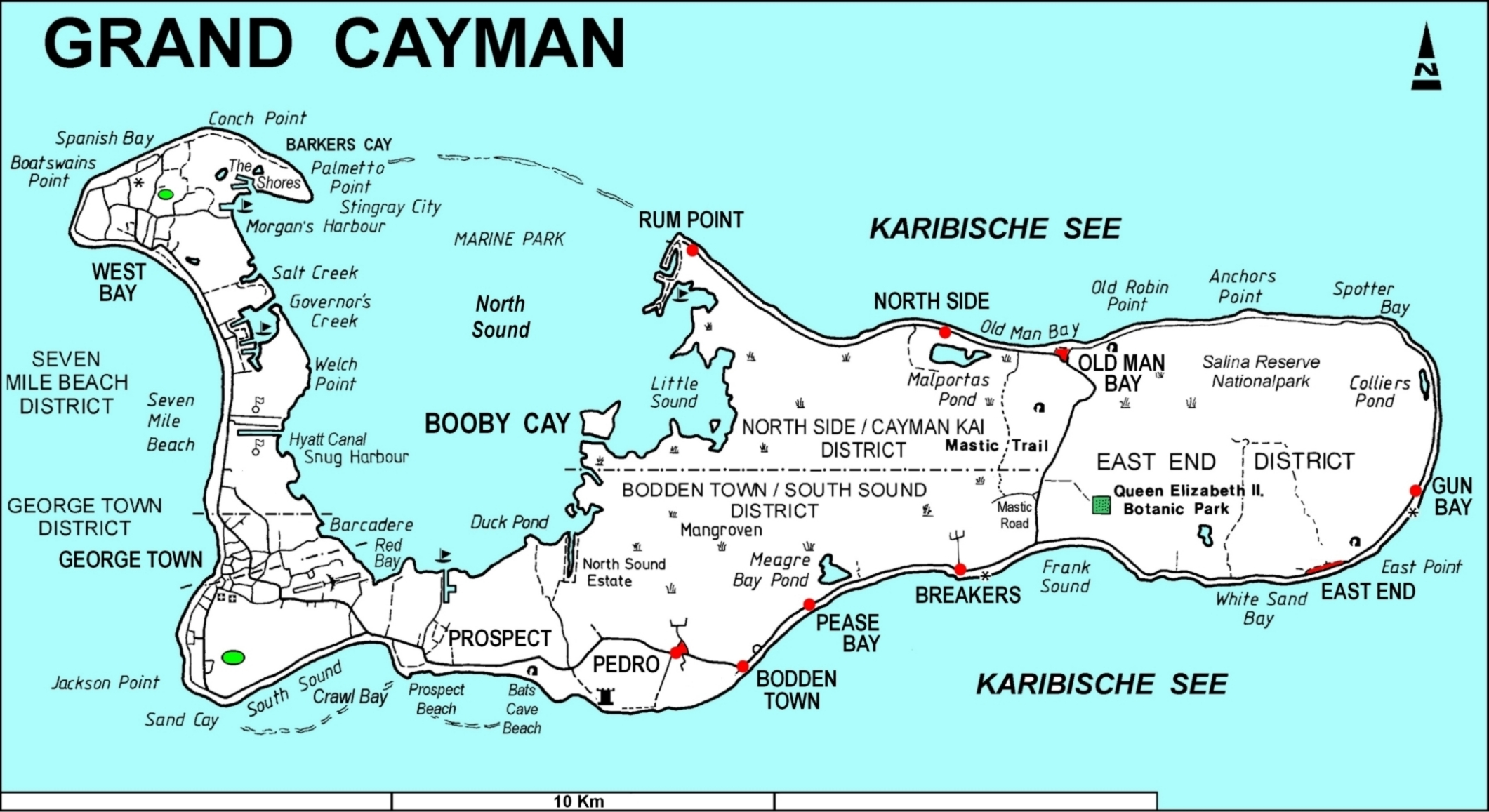
Map of Grand Cayman showing the site of the Mastic Trail

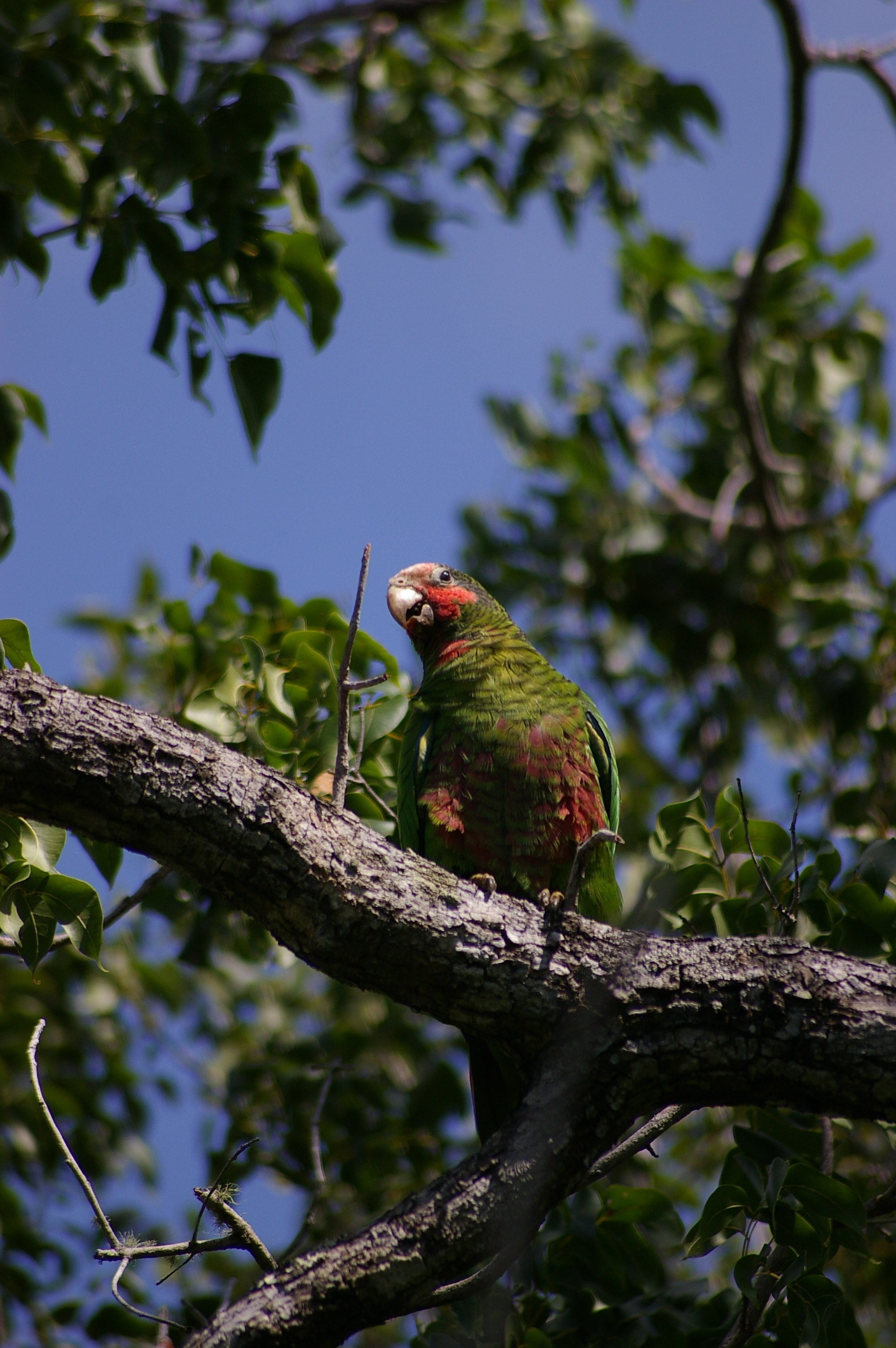
The Grand Cayman endemic subspecies of the Cuban amazon is found in the reserve

Mastic Reserve lies at the eastern end of the North Side of Grand Cayman, one of the Cayman Islands, a British Overseas Territory in the Caribbean Sea. It, with the associated Mastic Trail, is managed by the National Trust for the Cayman Islands and is one of the territory's Important Bird Areas (IBAs). It is named after the yellow mastic and black mastic trees which occur in the reserve.

== Description ==
Mastic Reserve is an 843 acre tract of mainly forested land. It is bounded on the south and west by the Central Mangrove Wetland, and on the north by farmland. It encompasses the largest tract of contiguous native dry forest in the Cayman Islands, as well as the highest part of the low-lying island, with an elevation of 18 m. It also includes stands of royal and silver thatch palms as well as abandoned agricultural land, now grassland.

=== Mastic Trail ===
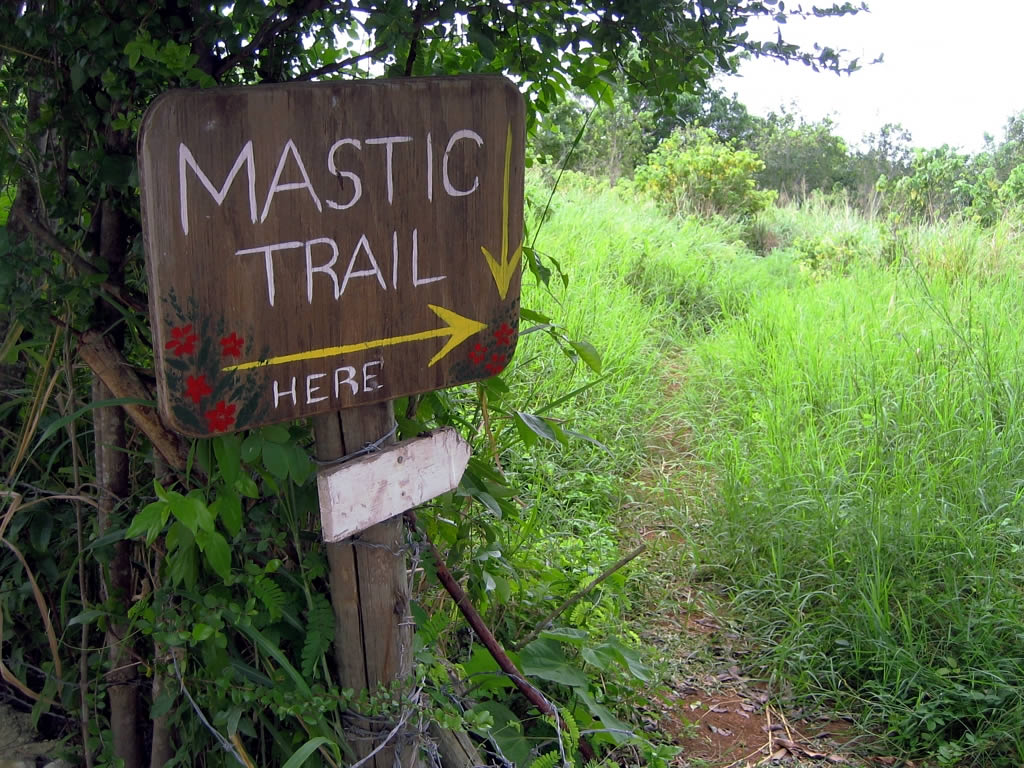

The Mastic Trail is based on a traditional footpath that had fallen into disuse. In 1994 and 1995 it was restored and reopened as a 4 km walking track that passes through the reserve, traversing the central part of Grand Cayman from south to north. The southern part includes a 170 m hand-built rock causeway, known as the “Mastic Bridge”, through black mangrove forest.

=== Birds ===
The IBA was identified as such by BirdLife International because it supports significant populations of white-crowned pigeons, Cuban amazons, Caribbean elaenias, thick-billed vireos, Yucatan vireos and vitelline warblers. Other birds found in the reserve include West Indian woodpeckers and Caribbean doves.

== Expansion ==
In 2013, the National Trust for the Cayman Islands bought eight acres of land to expand Mastic Reserve.

In April of 2014, part of the Mastic trail was lost due to a highway expansion plan. Because of the new road, the trail starts slightly north of its previous location.
