= Grand Cayman =

Island in the Caribbean

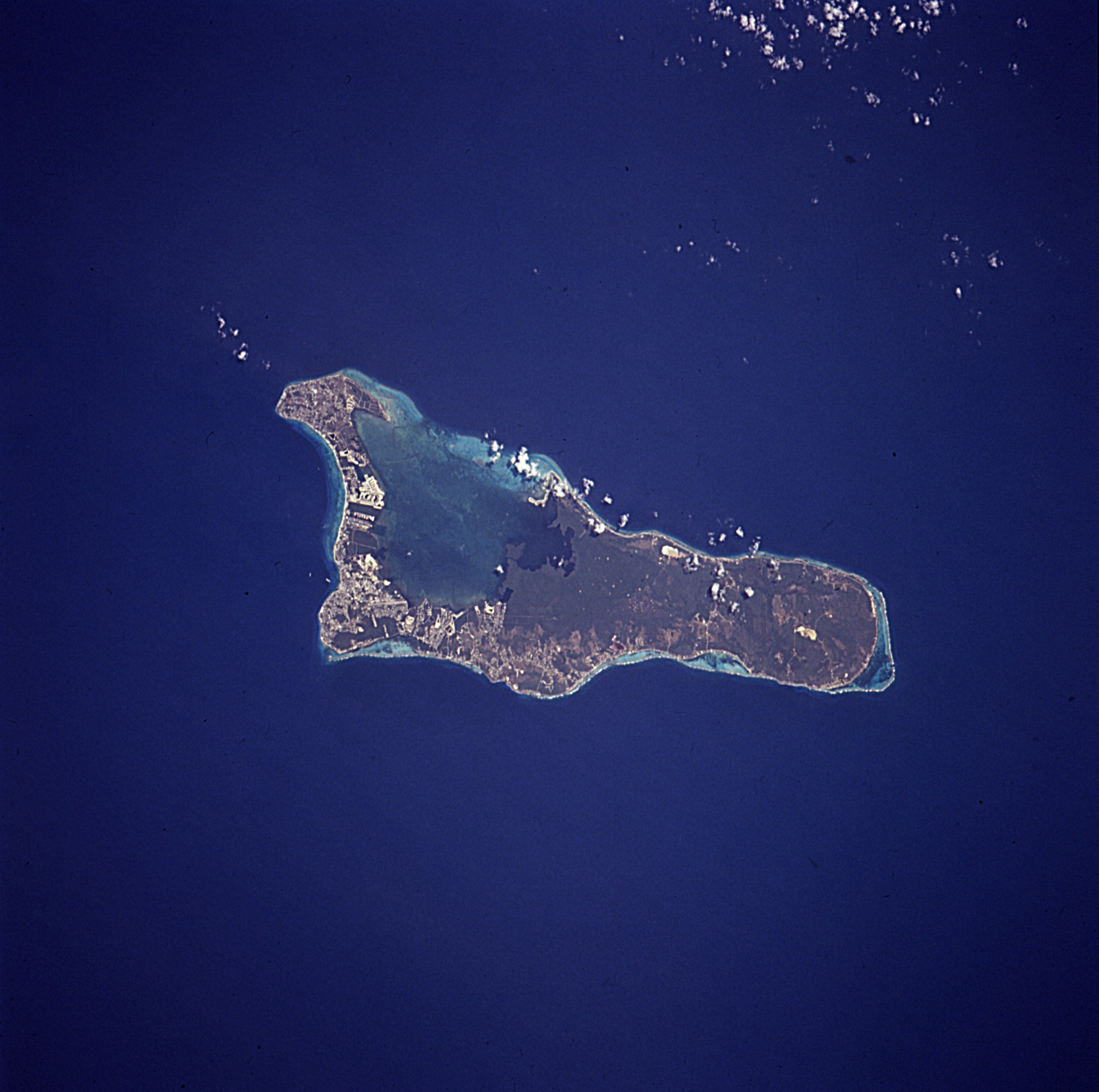
- Grand Cayman from space, April 1994

- Location within Grand Cayman Location within Cayman Islands Location within the Caribbean

Geography
- Location: Caribbean
- Coordinates: 19.33°N 81.24°W
- Archipelago: Greater Antilles
- Area: 196 km^{2} (76 sq mi)
- Highest elevation: 18 m (59 ft)
- Highest point: unnamed

Administration
- United Kingdom
- Territory: Cayman Islands
- Largest settlement: George Town (pop. 34,921)

Demographics
- Population: 75,000+ (2021)
- Pop. density: 224.6/km^{2} (581.7/sq mi)

Grand Cayman is the largest of the three Cayman Islands and the location of the territory's capital, George Town. In relation to the other two Cayman Islands, it is approximately 75 miles (121 km) southwest of Little Cayman and 90 miles (145 km) southwest of Cayman Brac.

Location of Grand Cayman (circled), south of Cuba and the Florida peninsula

== Geography ==
Grand Cayman encompasses 76% of the territory's entire land mass. The island is approximately 22 miles (35 km) long with its widest point being 8 miles (13 km) wide. The elevation ranges from sea level at the beaches to 60 feet (18 m) above sea level on the North Side's Mastic Trail. Unlike many other Caribbean islands, Grand Cayman is, for the most part, flat. This allows for more space to build as the island's population grows. In the middle of the island is the Central Mangrove Wetland, taking up roughly 17.8% of Grand Cayman.

== Island districts ==
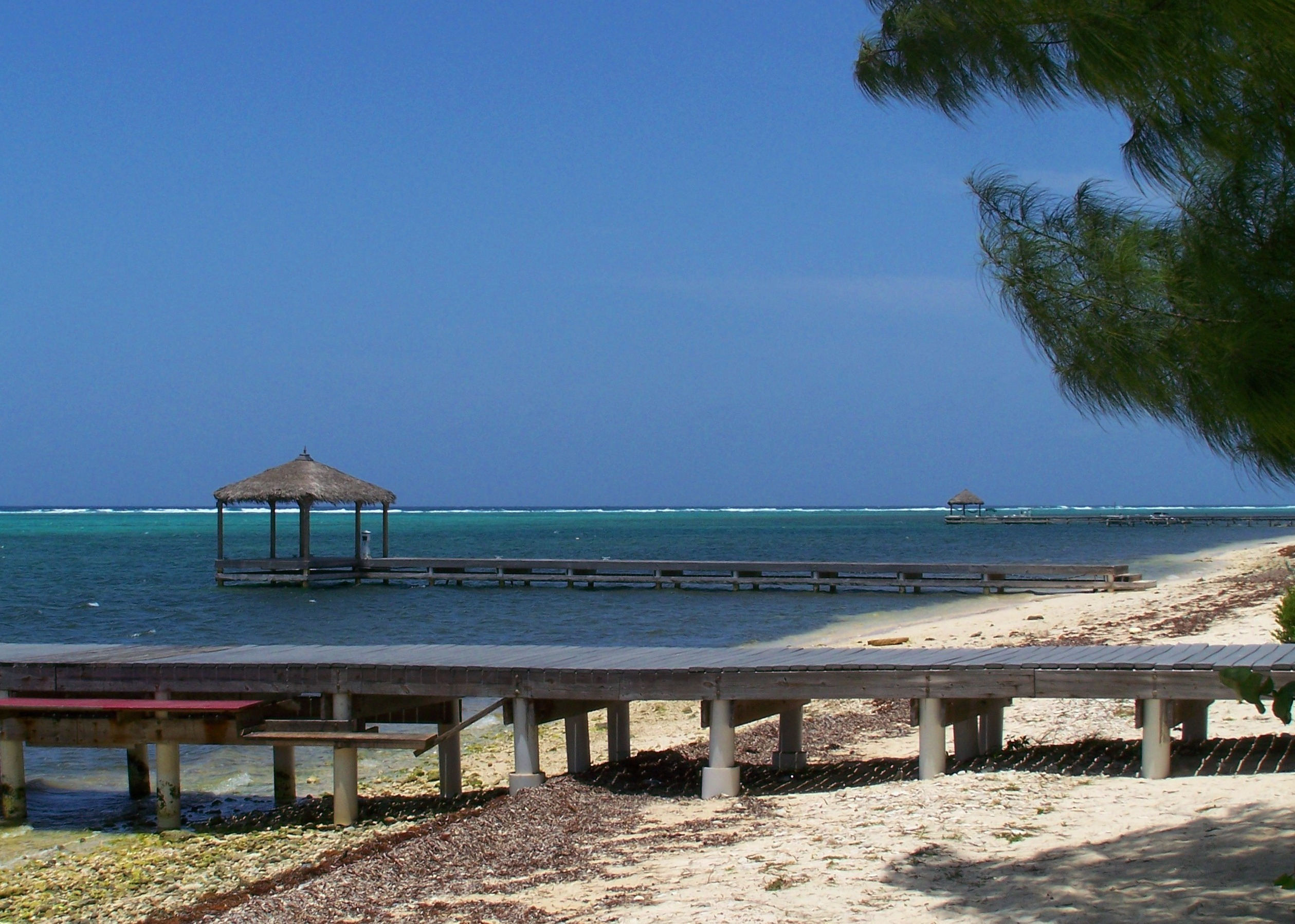
Red Bay Dock and adjacent piers, South Sound, George Town district

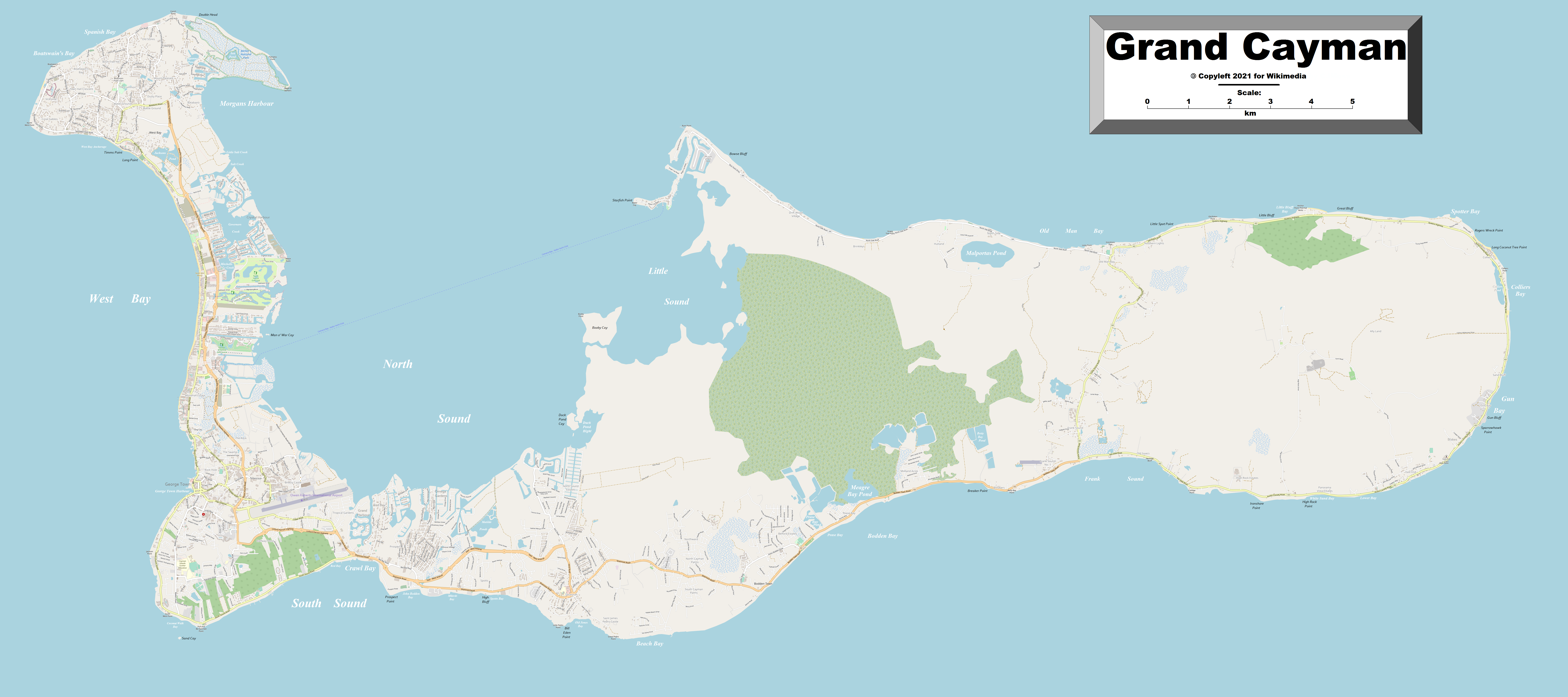
Enlargeable, detailed map of Grand Cayman

Grand Cayman Island includes five of the six districts of the Cayman Islands: Bodden Town, East End, George Town, North Side and West Bay.

- Bodden Town – Founded in the 1700s, Bodden Town district comprises the central part of Grand Cayman Island, between the George Town and North Side districts. The village of Bodden Town was the original capital of the Cayman Islands.
- East End – The East End district is located at the east side of Grand Cayman Island and consists mostly of the Village of East End, Franklin's Forest, Eastern Dry Forest, and other natural attractions, restaurants, and accommodations.
- George Town – The capital of the Cayman Islands and world-famous centre for offshore banking and investments,
- North Side – Includes Kaibo and Rum Point. Sand Point Cove in Rum Point is home to a Bioluminescent Bay or Bio Bay.
- West Bay – Has numerous tourist attractions including the Cayman Turtle Farm and the Cayman Motor Museum. Towns in the West Bay district include Seven Mile Beach, Hell.

The remaining district is Sister Islands, which consists of the islands of Cayman Brac and Little Cayman.

== Flora and fauna ==
=== Flora ===
Of the flora, a good representation of the variety of plant life on Grand Cayman can be found at the Queen Elizabeth II Botanic Park located in the North Side District. Wild banana orchids, ghost orchids, thatch palm trees, red birch trees, mahogany trees and various fruit trees such as avocado, mango, guinep, naseberry, breadfruit, and tamarind. Yellow mastics (Sideroxylon foetidissimum) and black mastics (Terminalia eriostachya) are also seen in the park, as well as on the 2 miles (3.2 km)-long Mastic Trail. Elsewhere outside the park, all of these species can be seen around Grand Cayman, including coconut palms, Casuarina pines, mangroves, and poinciana trees.

=== Fauna ===
Fauna seen in various locations around the island include the endangered blue iguana (Cyclura lewisi), Grand Cayman amazon parrots (Amazona leucocephala caymanensis), Central American agoutis (Dasyprocta punctata), a species of land crab called Gecarcinus ruricola, and the island was also home to the extinct Grand Cayman thrush.

The Cayman Island's Turtle Farm located in the West Bay district raises green sea turtles for their meat and to release into the wild. Through breeding, the farm produces upwards of 1800 turtles a year. Between 1980 and 2006, the farm released approximately 30,600 turtles to the wild; because of a mark placed on each animal, the released turtles have been seen throughout the Caribbean.

There are four endemic snake species on Grand Cayman and two invasive species. They are all relatively harmless and the largest is the rarely seen invasive corn snake, which may grow to about 5 feet (1.5 m). The smallest averages 2–4 inches (5–10 cm) and is the invasive brahminy blind snake which is also rarely seen. The most common is the endemic Grand Cayman racer, (Cubophis cantherigerus). It can grow to approximately 5 feet (1.5 m), but 3-foot (91-cm) specimens are much more common. These snakes tend to race away if encountered and in rare cases will rear up in a threatening manner if cornered. The Cayman racer snake carries a mild venom which it uses to immobilise prey, but in large enough doses it can cause significant swelling and bruising if it latches on for an extended period. A simple bite and release does not usually cause any reaction in humans. The other three endemic snake species are the Cayman Islands dwarf boa, Cayman Brac blind snake and Cayman water snake.

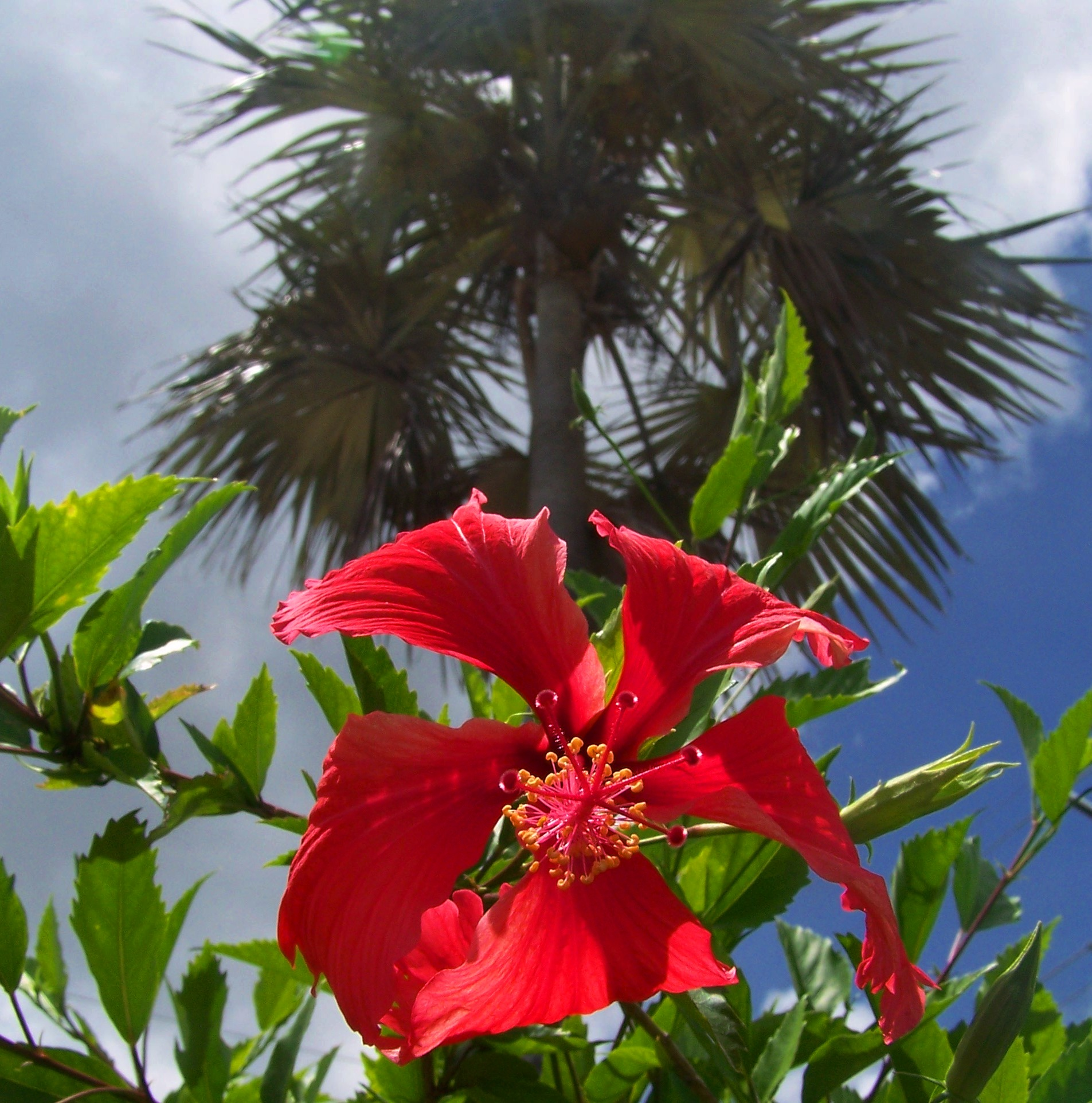
Hibiscus and palm tree on Grand Cayman Island

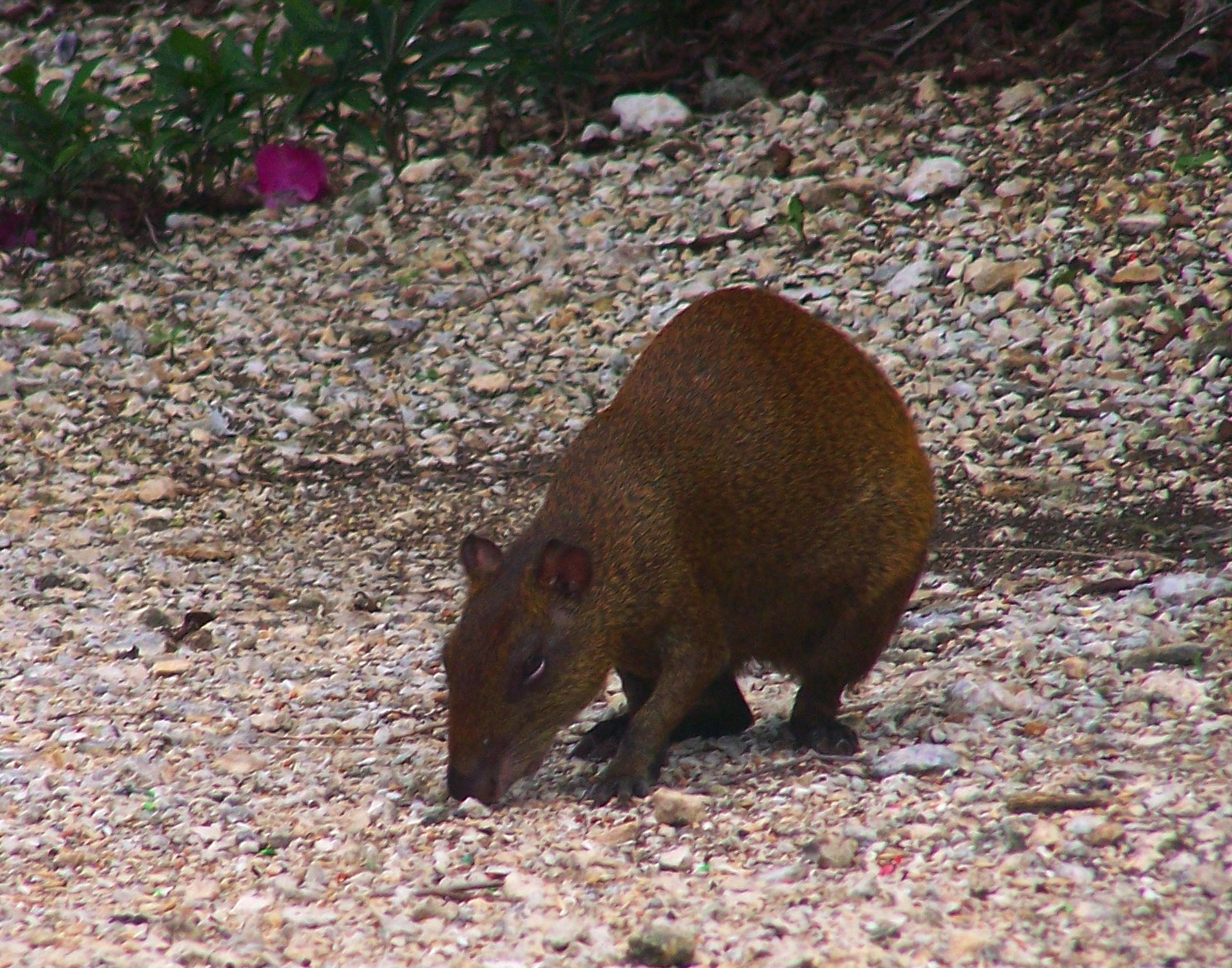
Central American agouti at Queen Elizabeth II Botanic Park

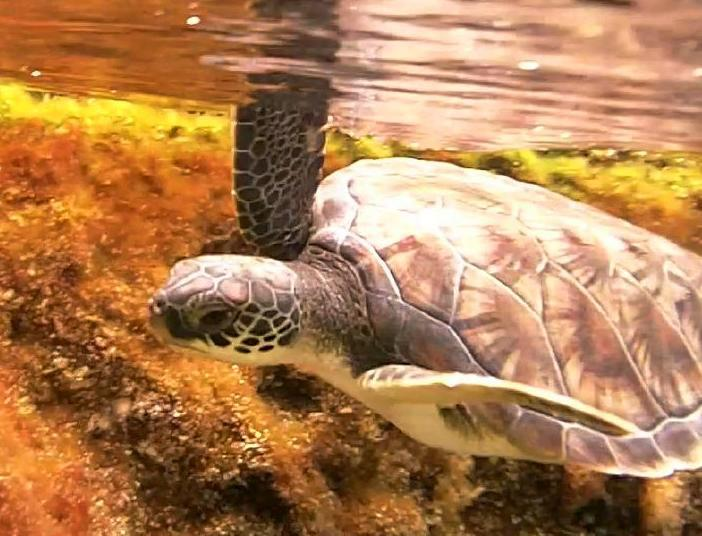
Green sea turtle in lagoon at Cayman Turtle Farm

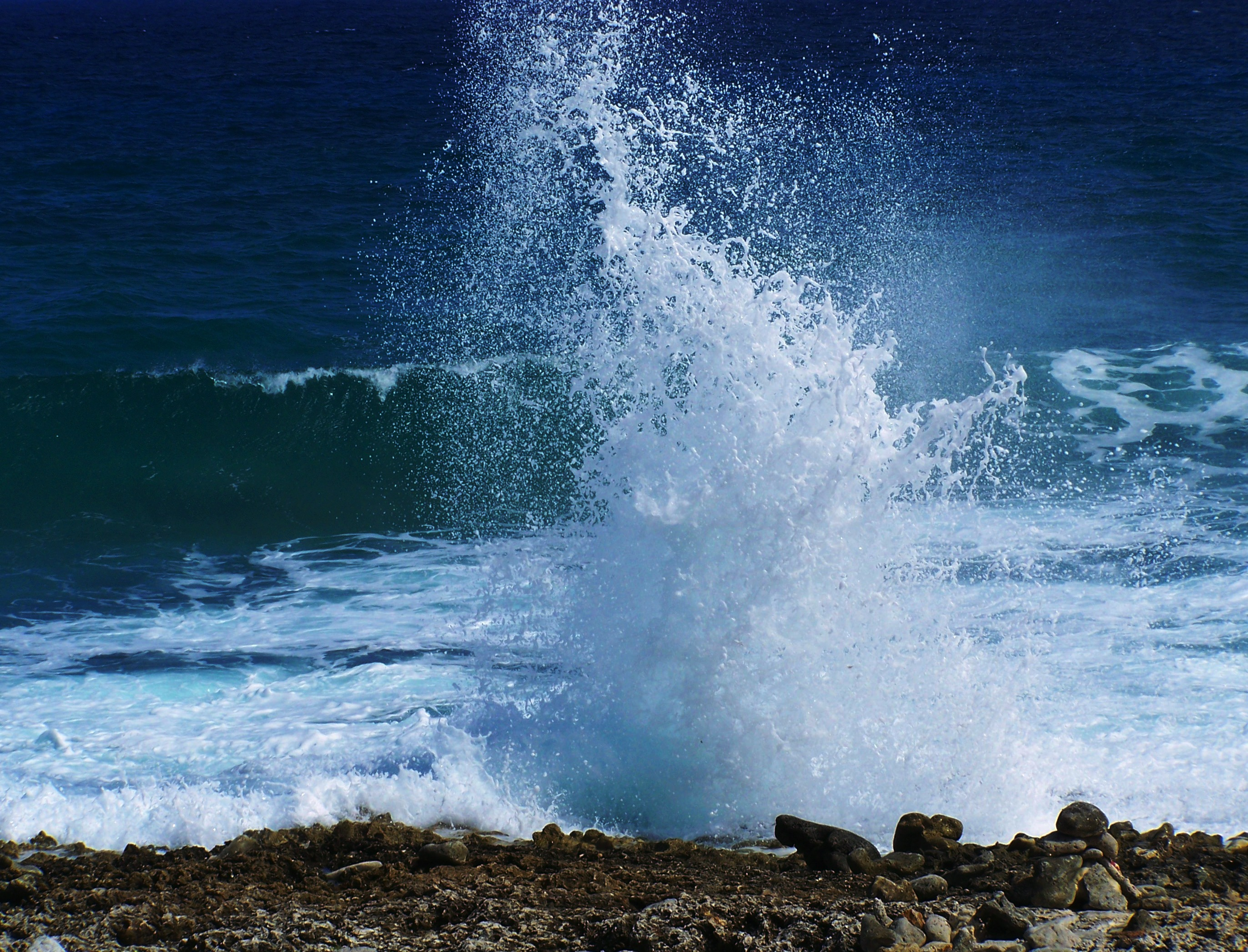
East End blow hole

== Demographics ==
Of the three islands, Grand Cayman contains approximately 97% of the territory's entire population. Caymanians and permanent residents make up 52% of the population. There is a prominent expat population, making up 48%, with most originating from Jamaica, the Philippines, the United States, United Kingdom, and India. According to the 2021 Census Report the total population of the Cayman Islands was officially recorded at 71,105 (composing of 39,047 Caymanians and 33,058 non-Caymanians).

== Economy ==
=== Offshore banking ===
There are just under 600 banks and trust companies in the Grand Cayman, including 43 of the 50 largest banks in the world. Because of this large financial presence on the island, banking, investments, and insurance drive the economy in Grand Cayman.

=== Tourism ===
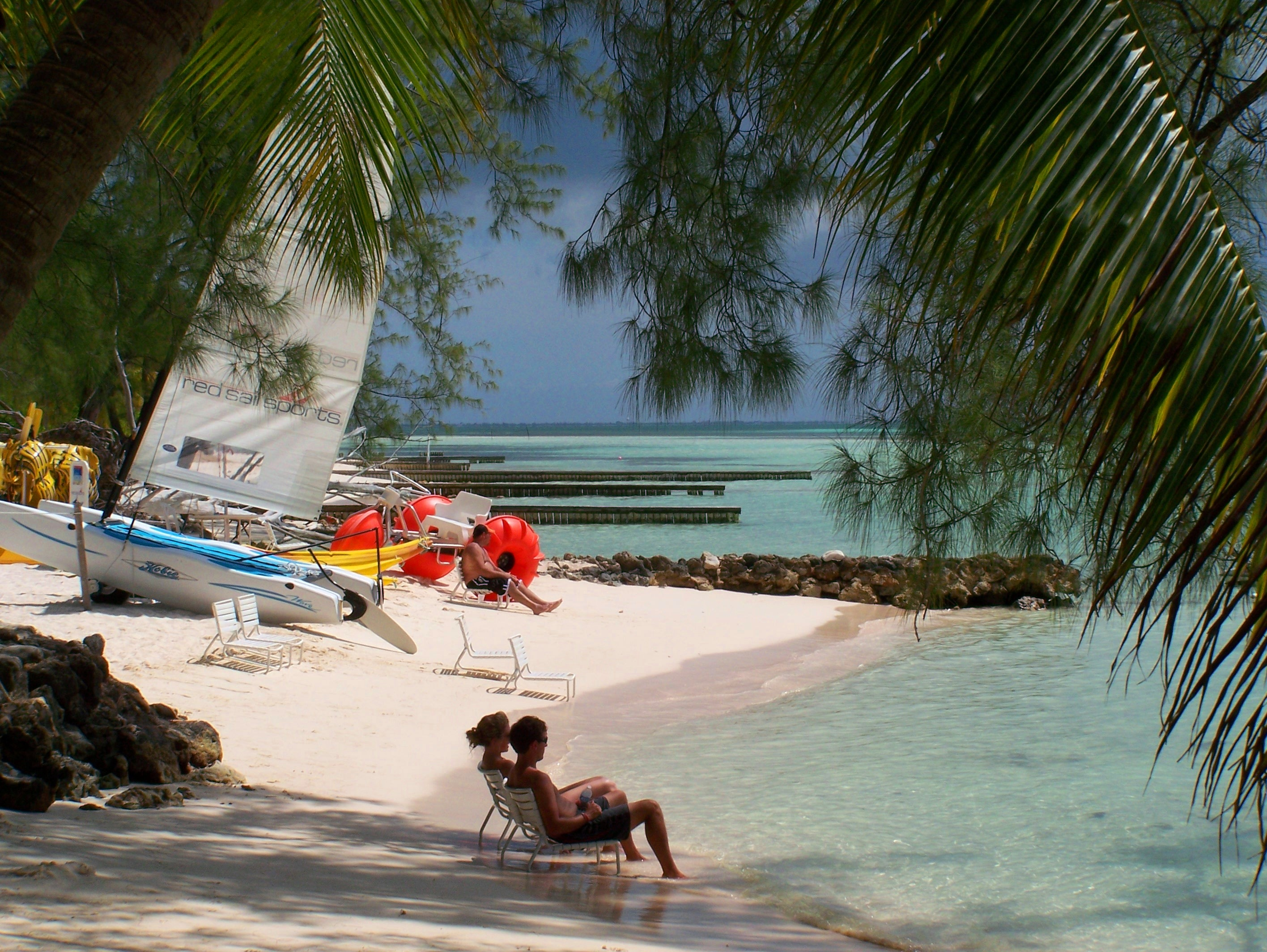
Rum Point beach

Grand Cayman Island has a number of natural attractions: the blow holes in the East End district, the Mastic Trail that runs north to south through the center of the island, Hell in the West Bay, and the Queen Elizabeth II Botanic Park.

Watersports such as scuba diving and snorkeling are popular activities on Grand Cayman as the island is known for its coral reefs and underwater sea walls along with a number of shipwrecks.

Because of its clubs, resorts, and hotels, Seven Mile Beach has the largest concentration of visitors and tourists on the island.

== Transport ==
Owen Roberts International Airport serves Grand Cayman with domestic and international flights. Cayman Airways has its headquarters on Grand Cayman.

Port of George Town is operated by the Port Authority of the Cayman Islands.

== Other infrastructure ==
Electrical service for Grand Cayman is provided by Caribbean Utilities Company Ltd., with its corporate headquarters located on North Sound Road. Electricity on Grand Cayman runs on a 120/240 volt electricity system with electrical outlets designed to accommodate a three-pin American plug.

Grand Cayman residents have a choice of telecommunications services from C3, Digicel, FLOW (previously LIME), and Logic.

Olive Hilda Miller was the first manager of The Pines, the first retirement home to be built in the Cayman Islands. She worked there from 1983 until 1991.

== Education ==
The Cayman Islands Education Department operates government schools.

=== Transition schools ===
- Cayman Islands Further Education Centre

=== Secondary schools operated by government ===
- John Gray High School
- Clifton Hunter High School

=== Primary schools operated by government ===
- Theoline L. McCoy Primary School
- Sir John A. Cumber Primary School
- Edna M. Moyle Primary School
- George Town Primary School
- East End Primary School
- Prospect Primary School
- Red Bay Primary School
- Savannah Primary School

=== Private schools ===
- Cayman Academy
- Cayman International School
- Cayman Prep and High School
- First Baptist Christian School (ages 3 months – 11 years, grades preschool to 6)
- Grace Christian Academy
- Island Primary
- Preschool In Cayman
- Montessori School of Grand Cayman
- St. Ignatius Catholic School
- Triple C School
- Truth For Youth School
- Wesleyan Christian Academy
- Hope Academy
- Clever Fish School

=== Private universities ===
- St. Matthews University of Medicine/Veterinary Medicine
- International College of the Cayman Islands (ICCI)
- The Cayman Islands Law School

=== Public universities ===
- University College of the Cayman Islands (UCCI)

== Gallery ==
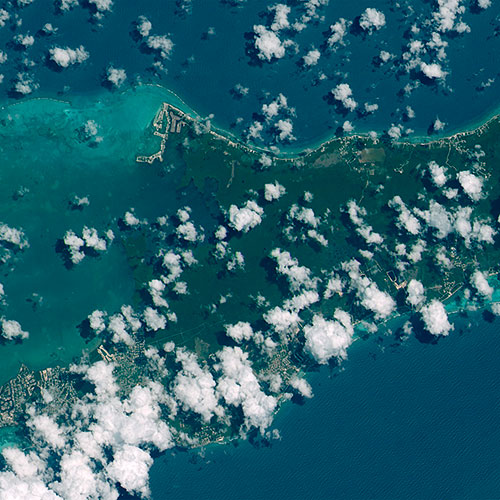
Aerial view of the island

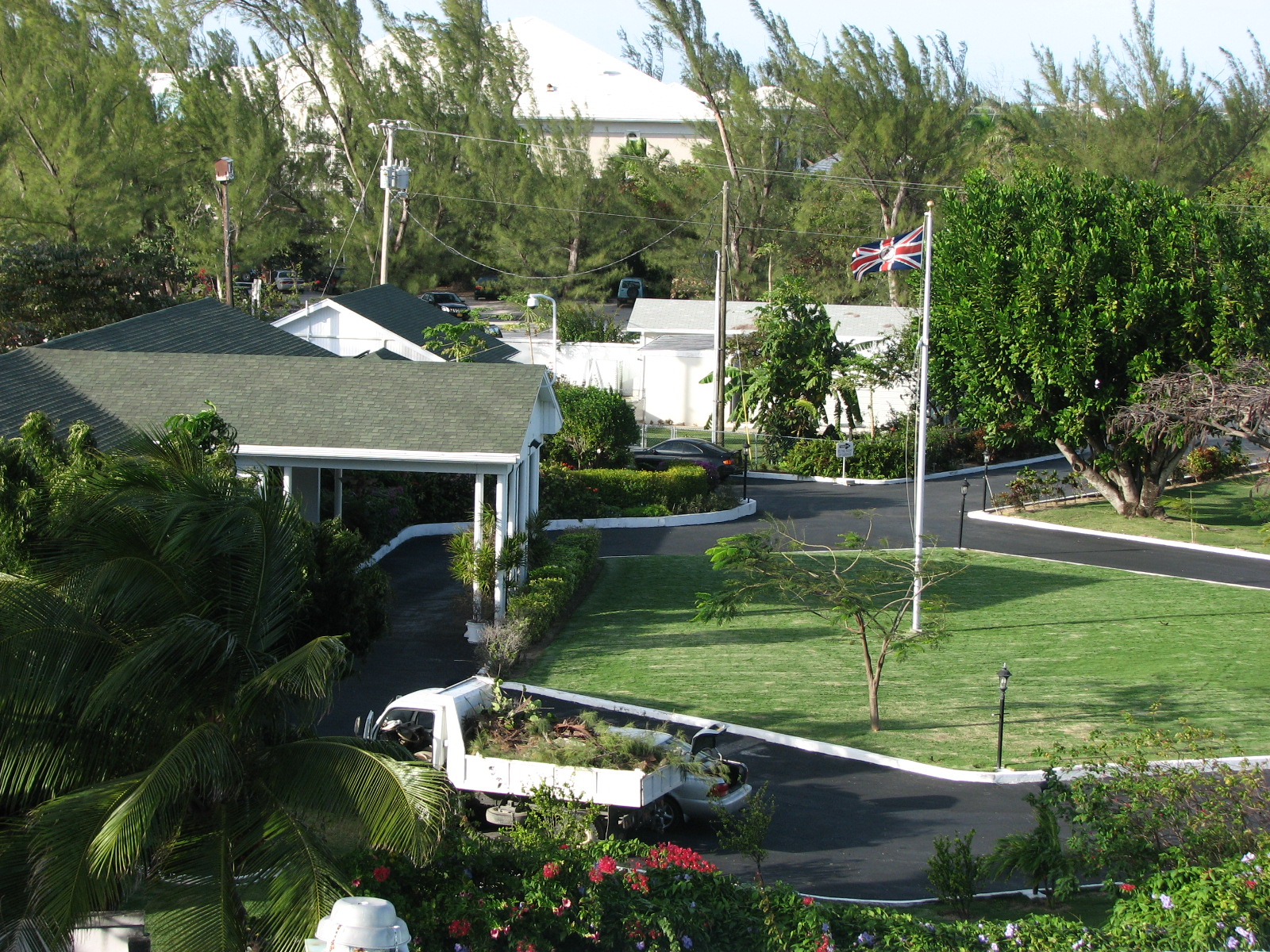
The Governor's Residence

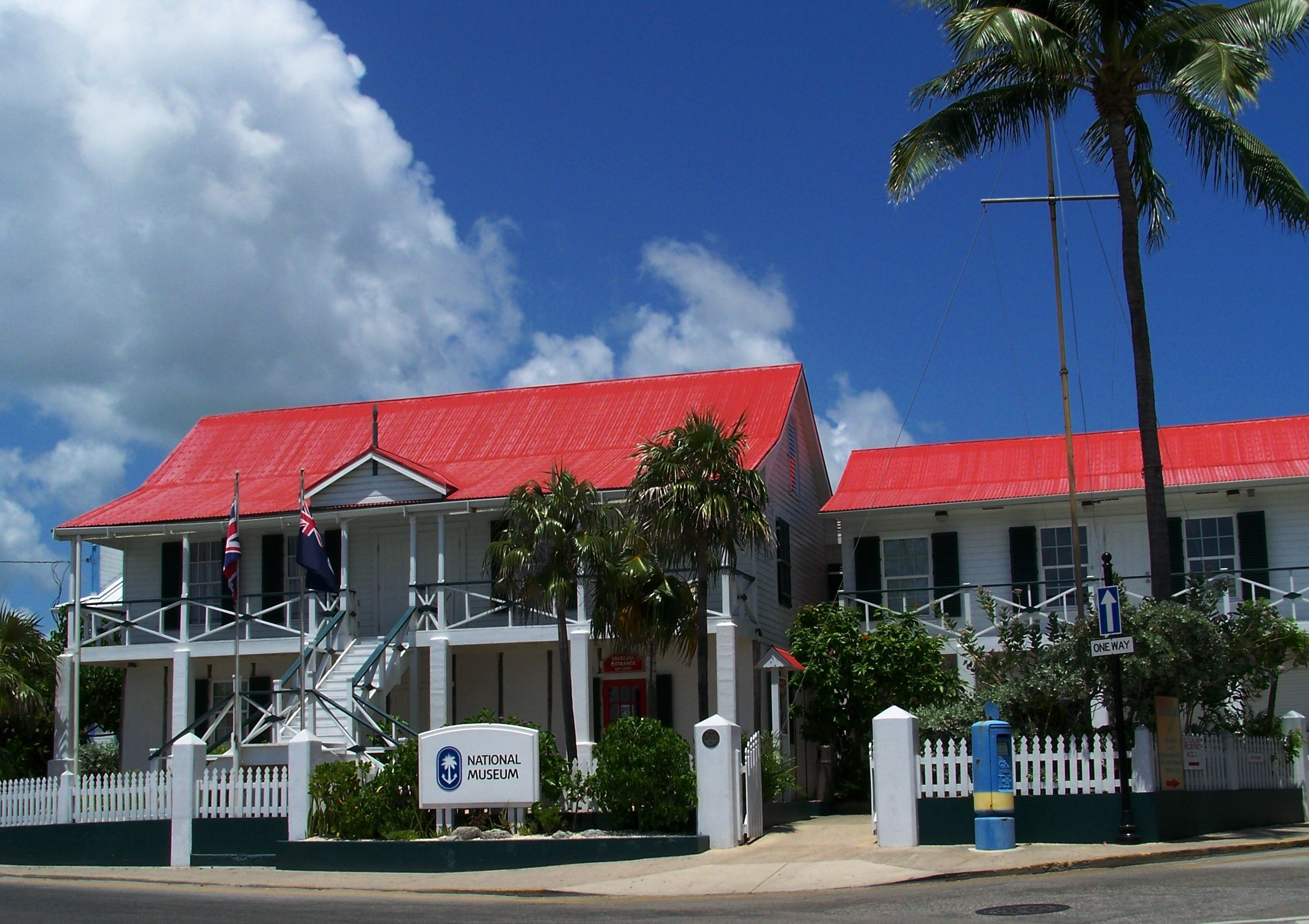
Cayman Islands National Museum, 2011

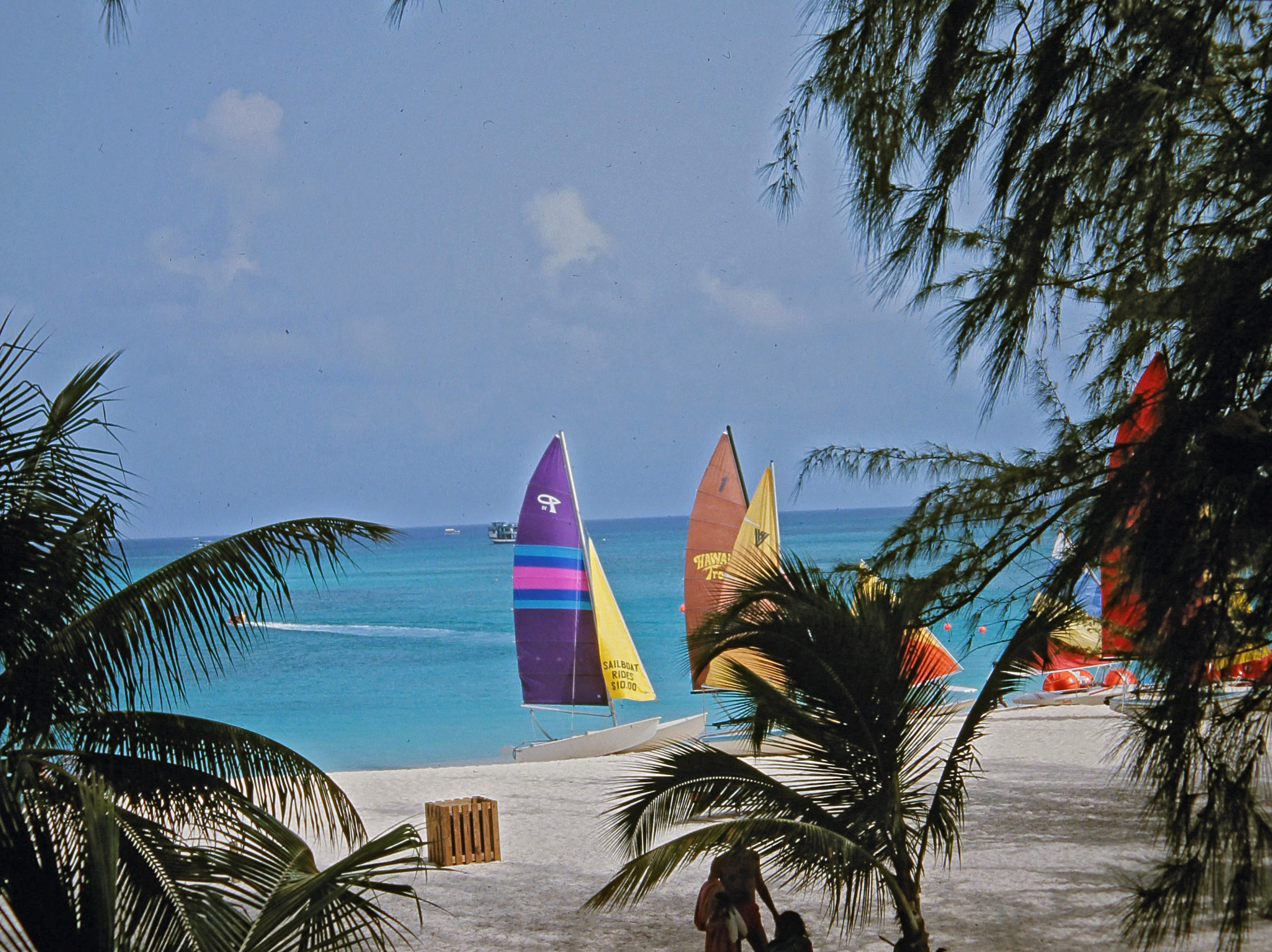
Sailboats on Seven Mile Beach

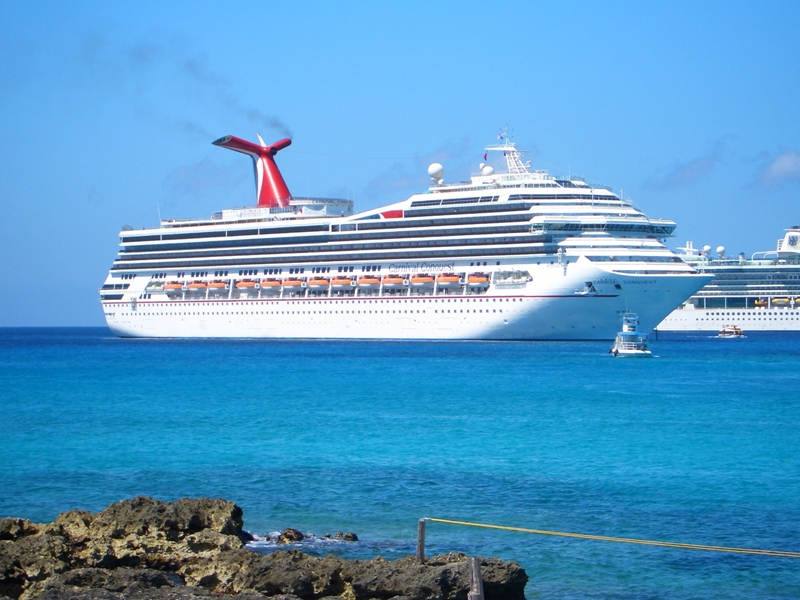
Cruise ship, Carnival Conquest anchored at Grand Cayman on 23 February 2006

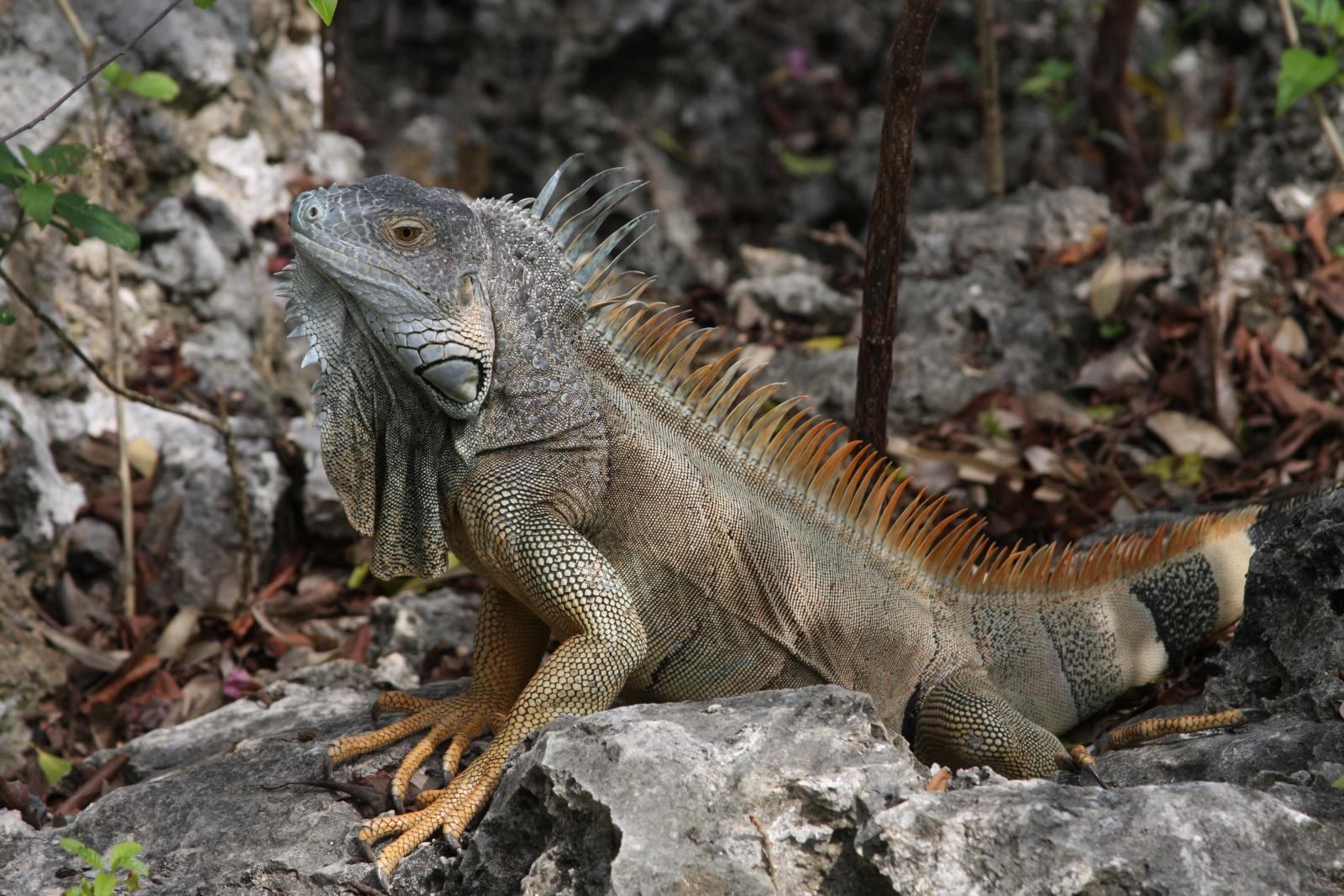
Iguana on Grand Cayman Island 2010

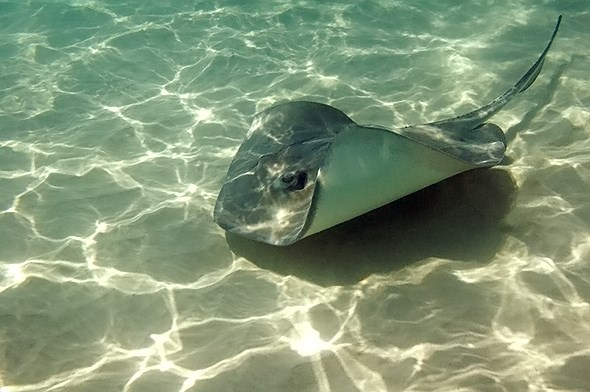
Stingray City

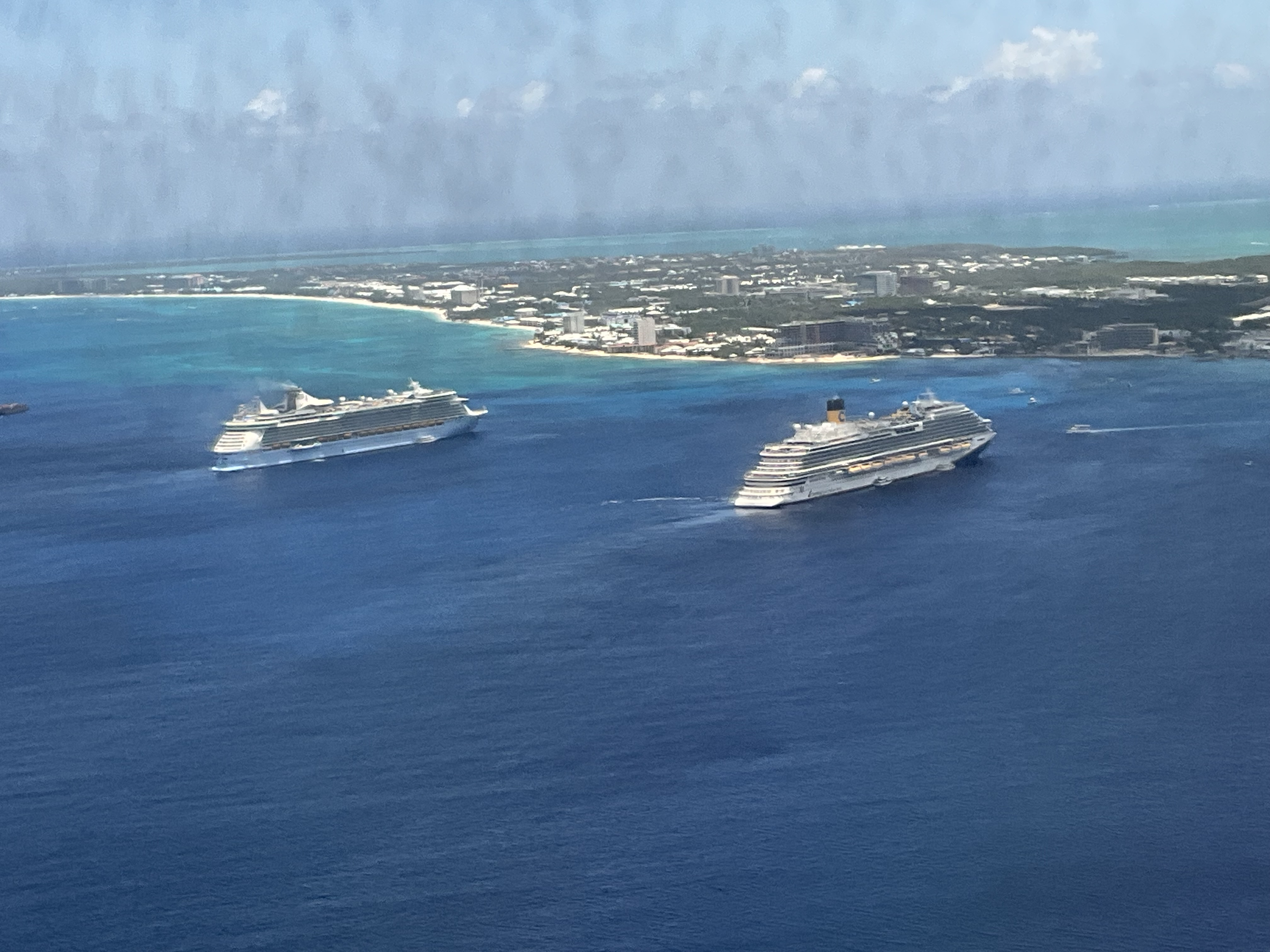
Two cruise ships, Freedom of the Seas and Carnival Venezia anchored at Grand Cayman on 24 April 2025

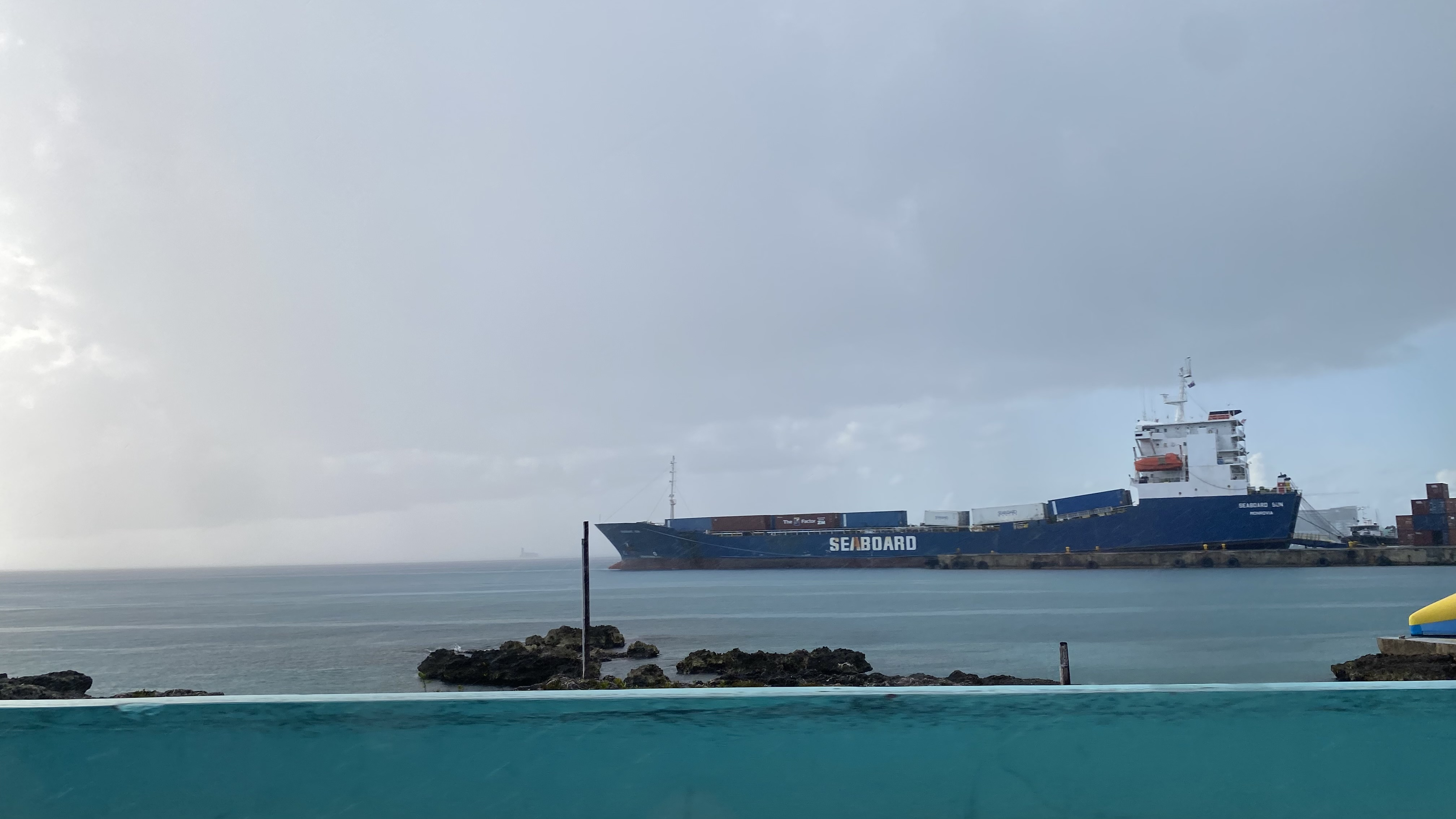
The cargo ship Seaboard Sun docking at Grand Cayman on 24 April 2025

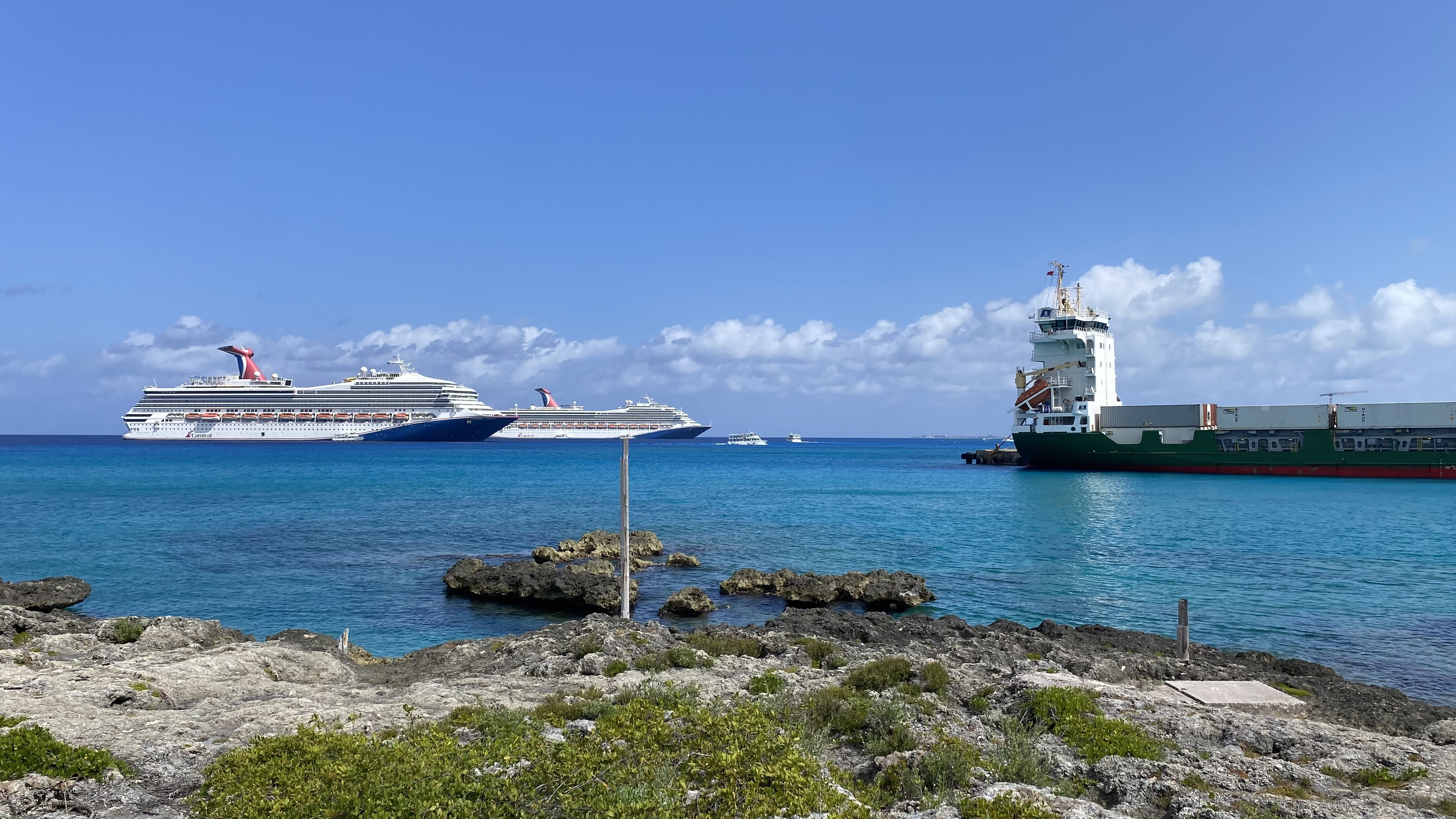
Two cruise ships, Carnival Sunrise and Carnival Liberty, and one cargo ship, BF Cartagena, on 1 May 2025

== See also ==
- Cayman Islands Investment Bureau
- Watler Cemetery
- Port Authority
