= Cayman Motor Museum =

- Established: 2010
- Location: 864 North West Point Road; West Bay, Cayman Islands
- Coordinates: 19.382308°N 81.415579°W
- Type: Automobile museum
- Founder: Andreas Ugland

The Cayman Motor Museum is a 12,000-square-foot (1,100 m^{2}) automobile museum located in West Bay, Cayman Islands, housing 80 rare, exotic and classic cars and motorbikes owned by Norwegian businessman Andreas Ugland.

The museum opened in May 2010, and also features a collection of paintings, photographs, and local artifacts. The museum is located near the Cayman Turtle Farm at 864 North West Point Road, West Bay.

== Collection ==
The museum includes the following:

- Replica of the 1886 Benz, the world's first car
- Exact model of the 1905 Cadillac, the first car driven in the Cayman Islands
- Royal 1956 Daimler DK400, Queen Elizabeth II's first limousine
- 1930 Rolls-Royce Phantom II
- 1988 Rolls-Royce Limo Silver Spirit
- 1954 Corvette
- Ferrari, Rolls-Royces, Corvettes, Jaguars, Maseratis, BMW, etc.
