= Malportas Pond =

- Location within Cayman Islands
- Location: Grand Cayman, Cayman Islands
- Coordinates: 19°20′41″N 81°12′10″W
- Type: salt lake

Malportas Pond is a salt-water pond on the north coast of Grand Cayman, Cayman Islands, near North Side village. It has an area of 44 hectares (110 acres) or 52 hectares (130 acres), and like the nearby Rock and Point ponds, it is an important area for breeding waterfowl. Local farmer Willie Ebanks introduced West Indian whistling-ducks on the pond in 1990, and it also has populations of heron, egrets, moorhens, and coots. It forms part of the Central Mangrove Wetland Important Bird Area, identified as such by BirdLife International because it supports populations of waterbirds.
