= Eastern Dry Forest =

Coordinates: 19°41′00″N 80°01′00″W

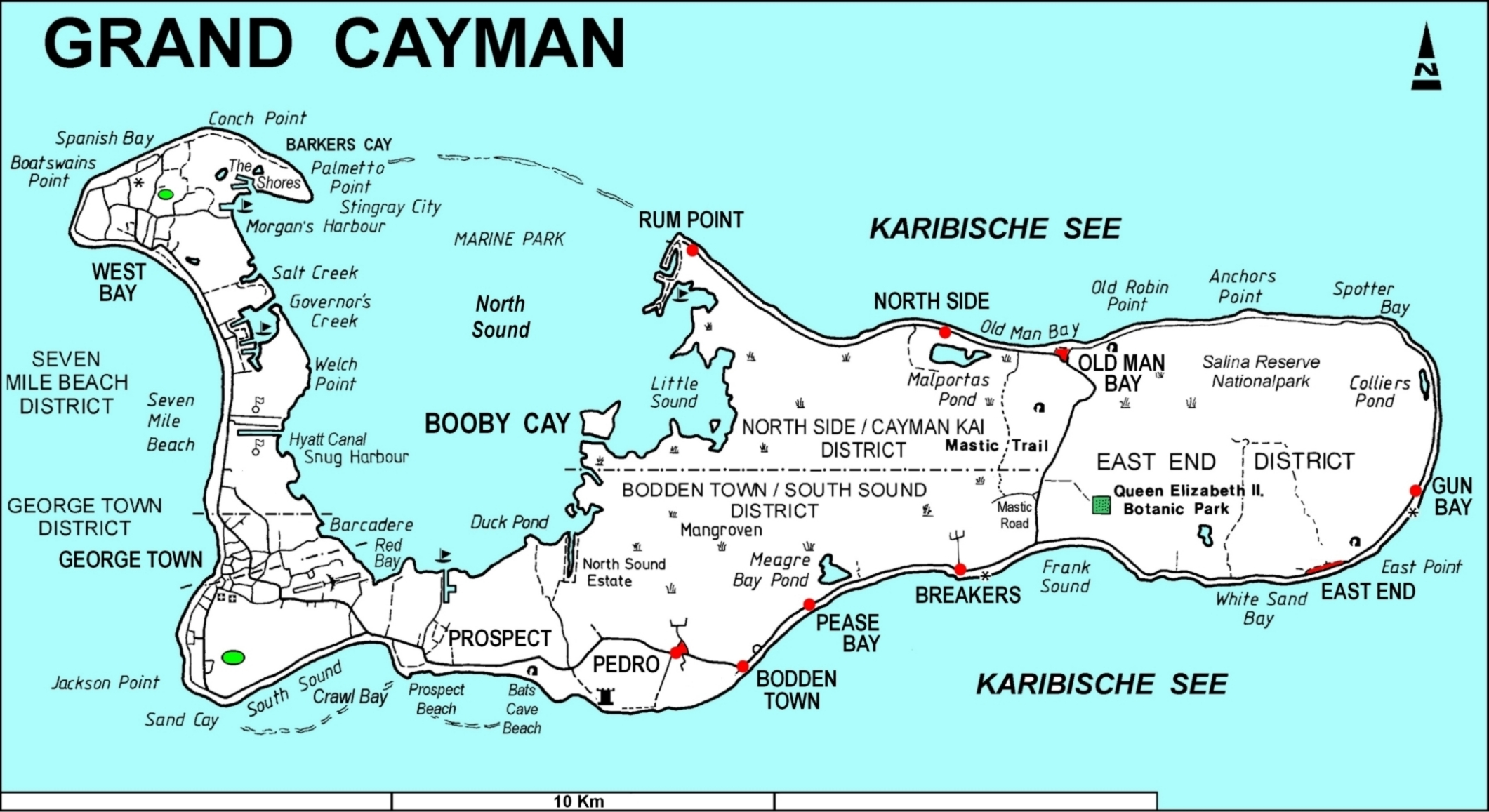
Map of Grand Cayman

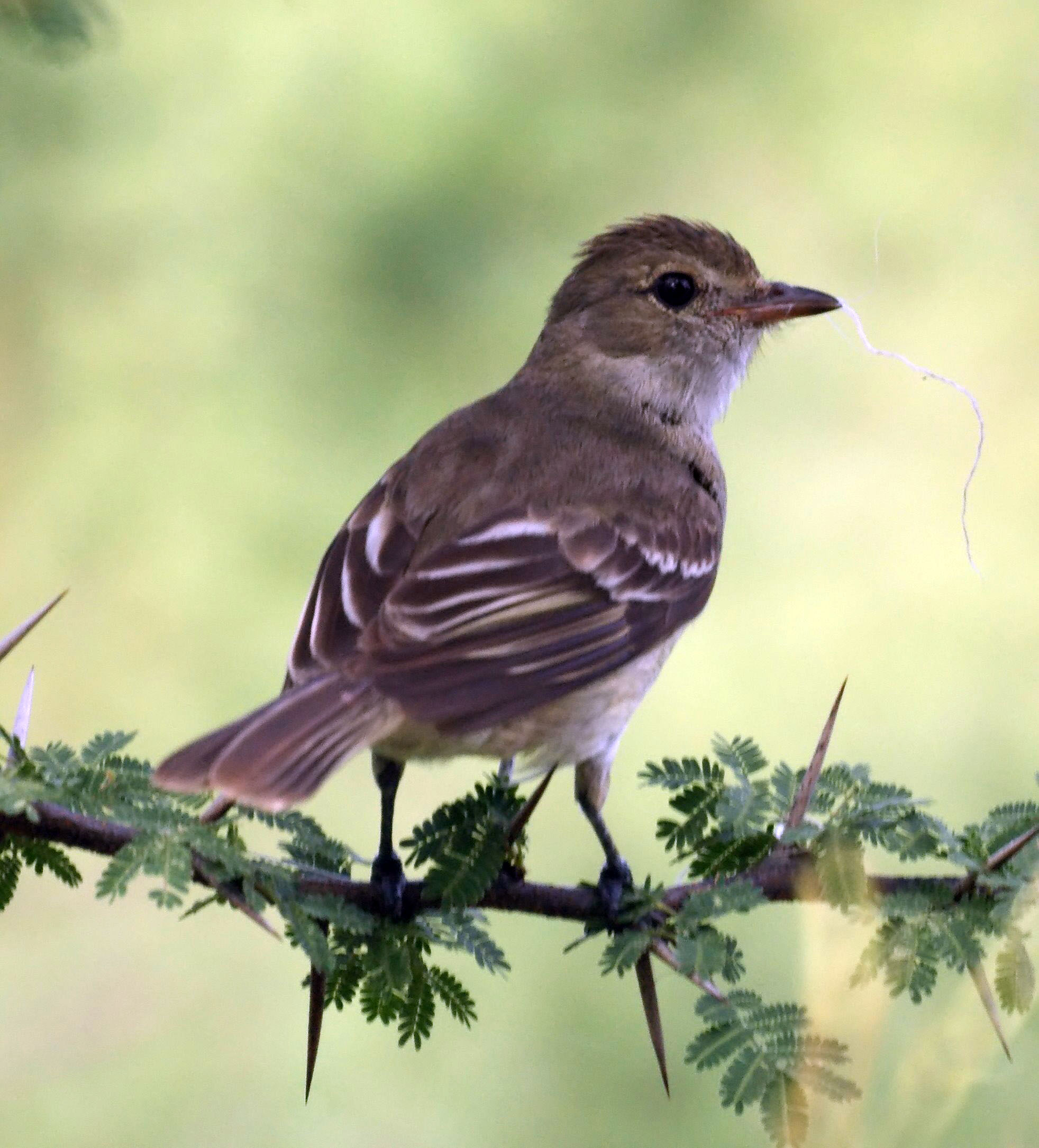
The Eastern Dry Forest is an important site for Caribbean elaenias

The Eastern Dry Forest lies at the eastern end of Grand Cayman, one of the Cayman Islands, a British Overseas Territory in the Caribbean Sea. It is one of the territory's Important Bird Areas (IBAs).

== Description ==
Eastern Dry Forest is a 239 ha tract of native tropical dry forest lying north of the town of East End. The only area of dry forest left at the eastern end of the island, it is privately owned, unprotected and is subject to clearance and fragmentation. In the 1980s the site contained some of the largest trees on the island and was an important breeding site for parrots.

=== Birds ===
The IBA was identified as such by BirdLife International because it supports populations of Cuban amazons, Caribbean elaenias, thick-billed vireos, Yucatan vireos and vitelline warblers.
