= Central Mangrove Wetland =

Coordinates: 19°19′00″N 81°14′00″W

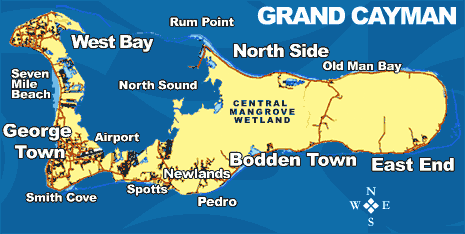
Map of Grand Cayman showing the Central Mangrove Wetland

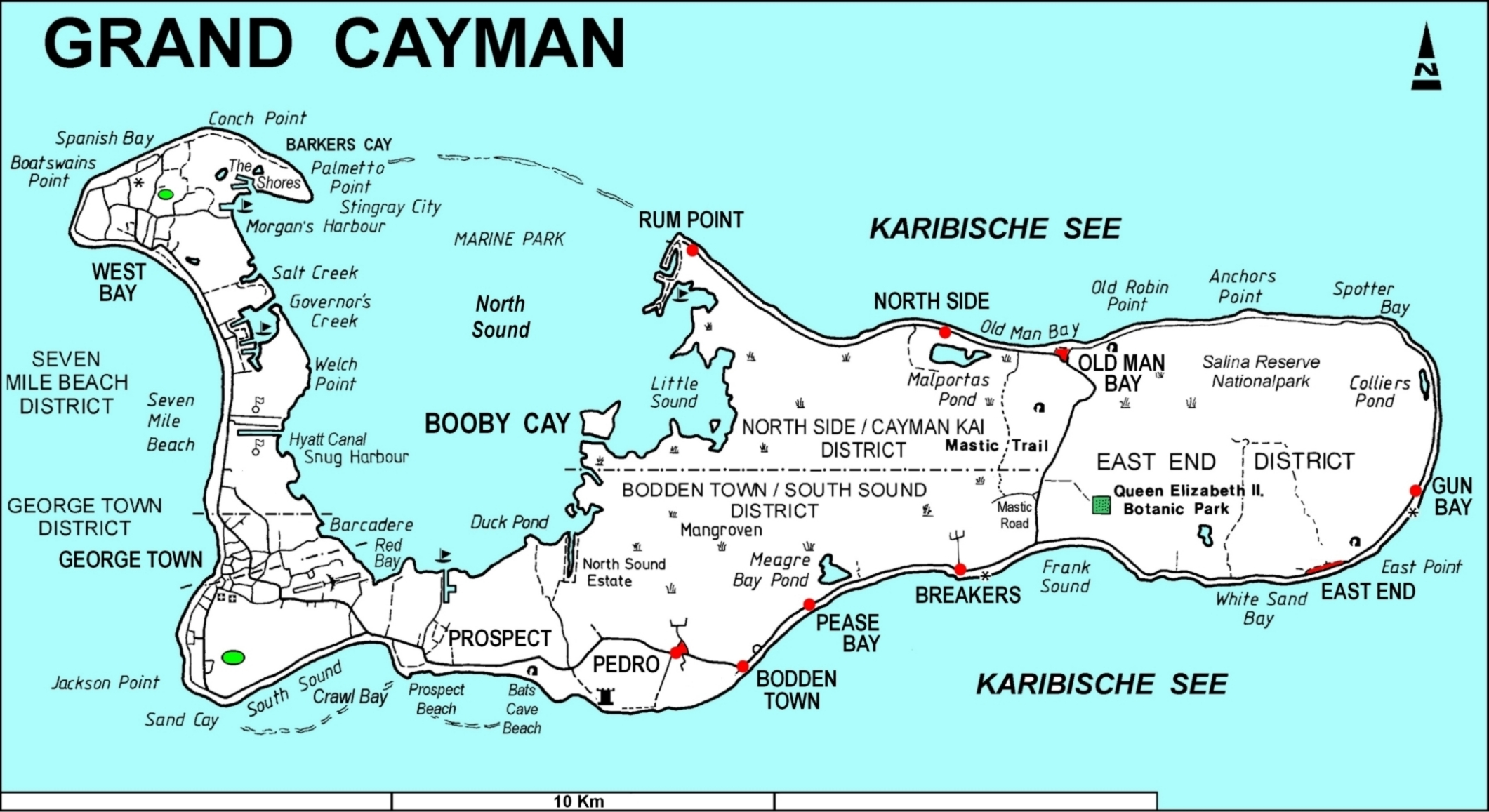
Map of Grand Cayman showing the locations of (left to right) the IBA sites of Booby Cay, Meagre Bay Pond, Pease Bay and Malportas Pond

The Central Manrove Wetland is a large area of mangrove dominated wetland on Grand Cayman, one of the Cayman Islands, a British Overseas Territory in the Caribbean Sea. It is one of the territory's Important Bird Areas (IBAs).

== Description ==
The 3553 ha IBA covers about 30% of the island area. It lies to the east of North Sound and includes Meagre Bay Pond, Pease Bay Pond and the islet of Booby Cay. The vegetation consists mainly of red, white and black mangroves, and buttonwood. It varies compositionally from stands of dwarf red mangrove on the border with North Sound to a forest of black mangrove on the outer southern boundary.

There are also areas of seasonally open water as well as scattered islets carrying native dry forest vegetation. The IBA includes the saline lake of Malportas Pond which is separated from the mangrove area and a major site for both resident and wintering waterbirds.

=== Birds ===
The IBA was identified as such by BirdLife International because it supports populations of West Indian whistling ducks (with 1500 individuals), least terns (with 55 breeding pairs), white-crowned pigeons and Cuban amazons.
