= Cayman Turtle Centre =

Conservation facility and tourist attraction in the Cayman Islands

Cayman Turtle Centre: Island Wildlife Encounter (formerly Boatswain's Beach)
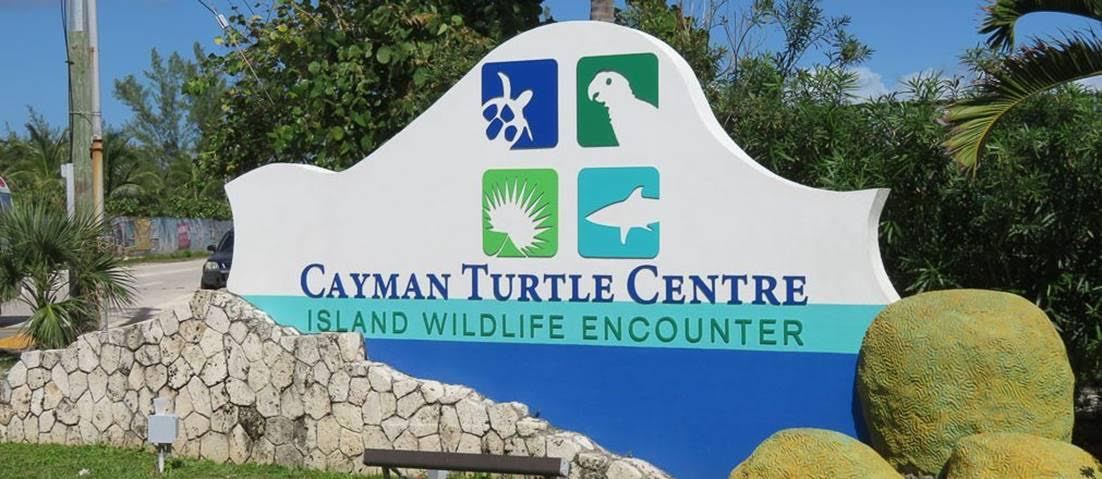
- Sign at the entrance to the Cayman Turtle Centre
- Interactive map of Cayman Turtle Centre: Island Wildlife Encounter (formerly Boatswain's Beach)
- Type: Aquatic nature park
- Location: West Bay district, Grand Cayman Island
- Coordinates: 19.380097°N 81.416398°W
- Area: 23 acres (9.3 ha)
- Founder: Mariculture Limited
- Operator: Cayman Islands government
- Visitors: 500,000+ annually
- Status: In operation
- Collections: Green sea turtle, Kemp's ridley sea turtle
- Website: www.turtle.ky

The Cayman Turtle Centre is a conservation facility and tourist attraction located in the district of West Bay in Grand Cayman, Cayman Islands. First established in 1968 as "Mariculture Ltd" and later called "Cayman Turtle Farm" by a group of American and British investors, the facility was initially used to breed the endangered green sea turtle for commercial purposes. By raising the turtles in a farming operation, the turtle meat could be produced for local consumption without depleting the wild population of the species.

Although still in operation as a farm for raising turtles in order to sell product, the Cayman Turtle Centre has been developed into an important research project and conservation facility. It is now also the largest land-based tourist attraction in the Cayman Islands and welcomes more than 500,000 visitors annually.

== History ==
While on his maritime travels, Christopher Columbus, when coming across the Cayman Islands in 1503, called the islands "Las Tortugas", because of the abundance of green sea turtles found there. During the 17th and 18th centuries, the Cayman Islands became a stopping point for sea vessels sailing the Caribbean Sea in need of food; the turtles caught in the Caymans were taken aboard ship and kept alive as a source of fresh meat. As settlements and towns on the islands were established over time, "turtling" became a way of survival and means of income in the Caymans. By the 19th century, however, the turtle population around the islands was near depleted and commerce centred on the green sea turtle shifted to the Caribbean off the coast of Nicaragua in Central America.

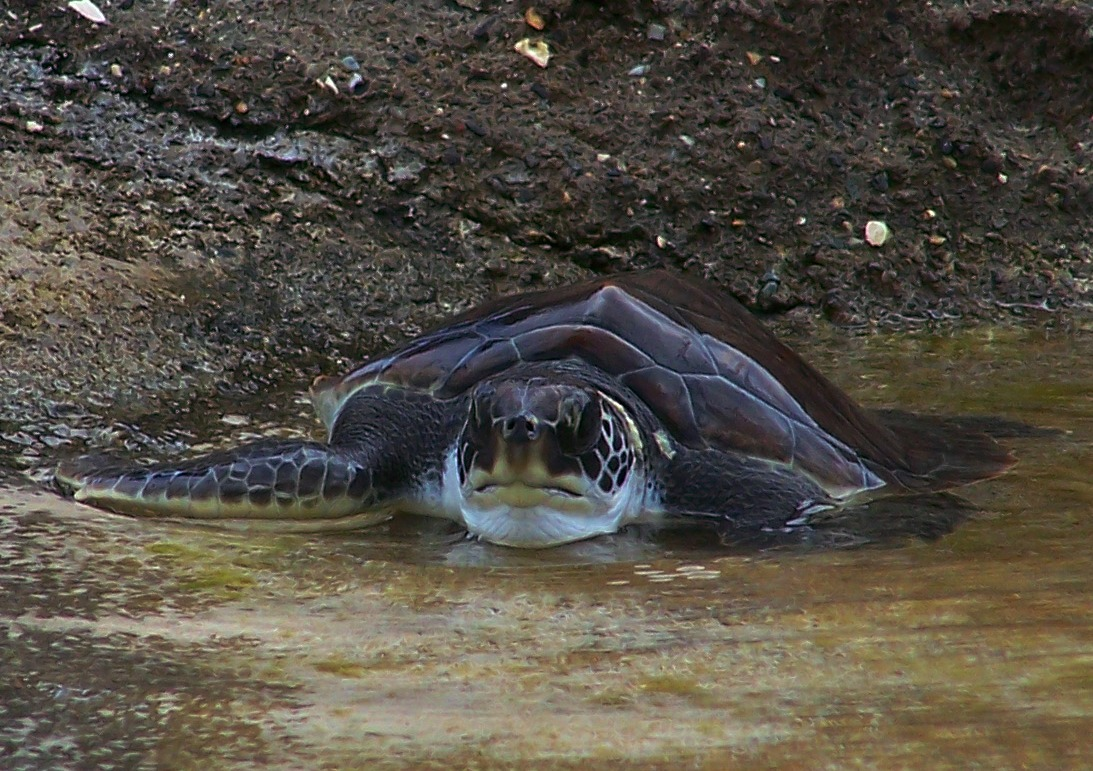
Young green sea turtle on Boatswain's Beach at Cayman Turtle Centre

During the 20th century, turtles were still caught and used for their meat in the Caymans. However, the depletion of the species around the islands made it impossible locally for turtling to continue to be a viable source of income. In 1968, American and British investors — Irvin Naylor, Henry Hamlin, Samuel Ayres, III, and Anthony G.A. Fisher — obtained licensing from the Cayman Islands government and grouped together to found Mariculture Ltd, Fisher taking the largest shareholding. The Bank of England's CDFC became a participant in 1970, CDFC's covenant supporting 50% of the equity and loan finance raised by the end of the year. While Mariculture worked to domesticate the green sea turtle, protection regulations threatened to prevent the sale/transhipment of all turtle products in/through the United States and other countries, limiting the commercial value of the Mariculture product. By the mid-1970s, the facility housed near 100,000 turtles, the expansion requiring a substantial investment of cash. With potential new investors finally unconvinced that Mariculture would be able to sell its products internationally, Citibank and CDFC placed it in receivership in May 1975, and financed its operations until the Mittag family of Dusseldorf, along with CDFC, bought the assets and re-capitalised them as "Cayman Turtle Farm Ltd" in early 1976. Subsequently, as a goodwill gesture, the new company paid off all the left behind local trade creditors of Mariculture and - though lossmaking - was adequately financed during its seven years of life. By 1978, the Farm was self sufficient in eggs from its captive breeding herd, making it the first enterprise to domesticate the green sea turtle, but there was little recognition of this fact in conservation circles and their opposition found expression in the "bred in captivity" ruling of the 1979 CITES conference in Costa Rica, challenging the Farm's captive breeding status. A dialogue with the Cayman Government about the future commenced in 1980, and the turtle herds were slimmed down by a substantial release programme and culling, as a means of cutting costs whilst retaining the essence of the Farm. Eventually, after an eighteen month negotiation, the Farm was sold on to the Cayman Government in April 1983 and re-named "Cayman Turtle Farm (1983) Ltd". Its overseas markets had finally closed, but the sale was effected without financial loss to any party except shareholders, and within five years the slimmed down farm - now reliant on tourist visitors - was generating a cash surplus (see"Financing the Cayman Turtle 1968 to 1988" (Amazon.com).

In 2010, the facility was renamed the Cayman Turtle Centre: Island Wildlife Encounter in order that visitors knew about the park's other attractions, beyond its sea turtles.

== Tourist attraction, conservation, and commerce ==
With the centre becoming successful in breeding and researching the green sea turtle as well as the Kemp's ridley sea turtle, the centre became one of the most successful tourist attractions in the Caymans by the turn of the 21st century.

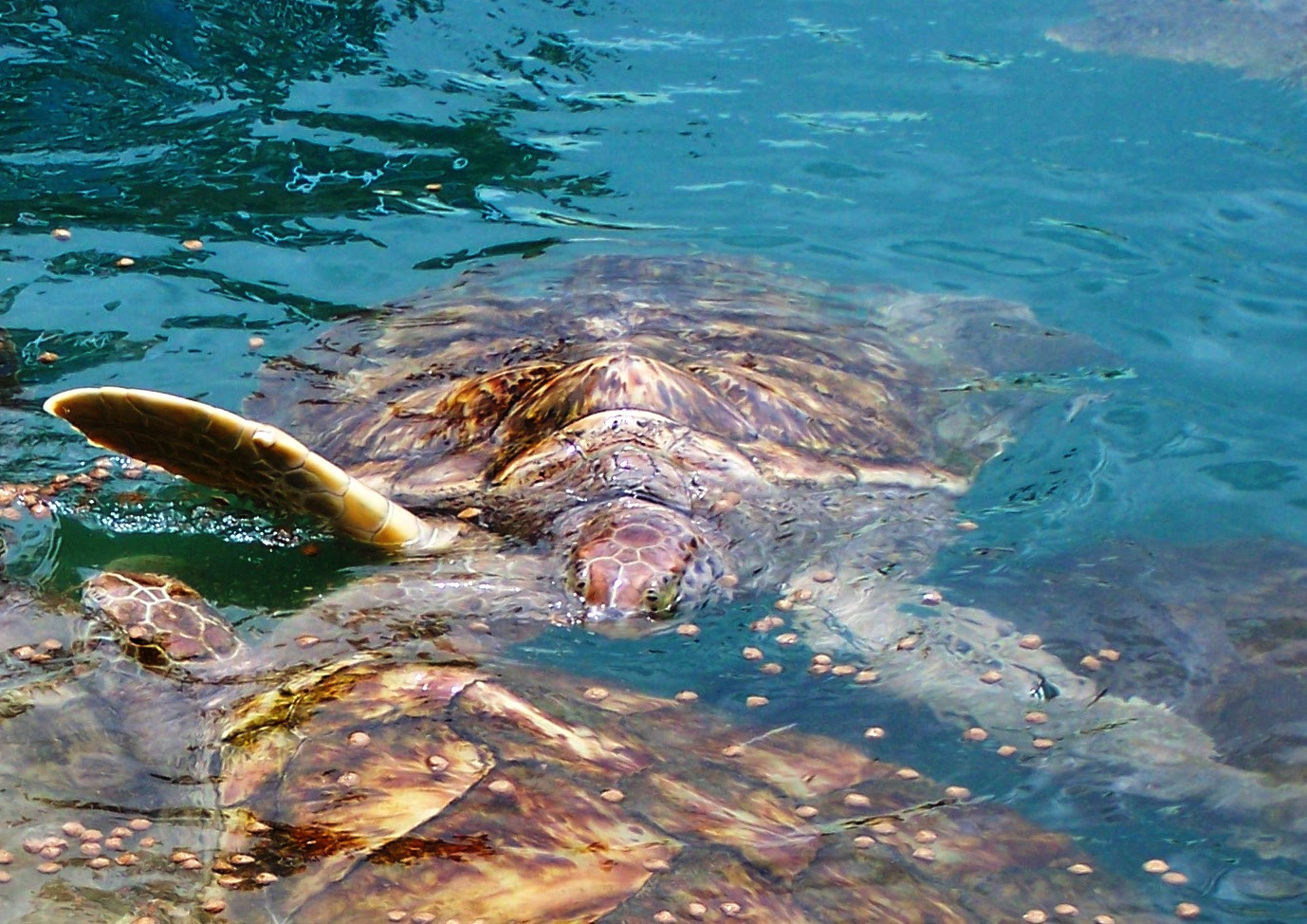
Feeding time at Cayman Turtle Centre

The centre is 23 acres and featured predators, birds, caiman, and other creatures in addition to turtles.

In 2001, however, a severe setback to the success of the centre as an attraction and breeding and research facility located next to the sea occurred on November 4, 2001, when large waves generated by Hurricane Michelle inundated the facility. The hurricane was located 90 miles southwest of Grand Cayman and produced little wind, but the waves washed turtles of all sizes from hatchlings to 600 pound adults out to sea. Cayman residents responded to help rescue the turtles and many were saved at the time. For months thereafter, the yellow-tagged turtles from the centre were spotted around the island for following Hurricane Michelle. 75% of the breeding turtles were lost. The centre's release and meat supply programs were reduced in an effort to build up the population following the event.

As a result of the disaster, the Cayman Islands government conceived a new vision for the centre when the breeding pond was relocated across West Bay Road from the current facility. The new and more modern facility was far enough away from the sea that it would no longer be in danger of high seas such as had been experienced during the 2001 hurricane season. As well, the new park became an expanded facility to include a nature park. The new tourist facility was named "Boatswain's Beach". Following the expansion, the entire park contained 23 acres that included a nature trail and aviary as well as a reef lagoon where visitors could snorkel with native fish and other local sea life, including the green sea turtle. A fresh water lagoon and waterfall was also included in addition to a predator tank where reef sharks would habitate. Visitors were still allowed entry to the areas around the turtle breeding and feeding tanks. In 2010 the facility changed its name from "Boatswain's Beach" to "Cayman Turtle Centre: Island Wildlife Encounter" and in 2012 it added a water slide feature to its fresh water lagoon.

The Cayman Turtle Centre is the only facility of its kind in the world. It is also the only facility to have achieved the second generation of sea turtles bred in captivity. It was also the first facility to successfully breed the endangered Kemp's Ridley turtle in captivity. Approximately 100 scientific papers have been presented or published based on work in collaboration with researchers at Cayman Turtle Centre. The largest turtle at the facility is Sparky, a 70-year-old female that weighs about 550 pounds.

== Controversy ==
In the 2000s, the Cayman Turtle Centre has come under attack from animal welfare and conservation groups who claim the Centre is failing to meet the welfare needs of the animals in its care and poses a threat to wild turtle conservation. International animal protection group, the World Society for the Protection of Animals (WSPA) cites poor water quality, overcrowding, unsupervised human handling, heightened levels of disease and congenital defects amongst the captive bred creatures.

Joined in support by the Sea Turtle Conservancy, the world's oldest turtle conservation group, WSPA has launched a campaign to stop the Cayman Turtle Centre from breeding sea turtles for human consumption. Sir Paul McCartney, former member of The Beatles has supported the campaign and urged the Centre to shift towards a more humane, sustainable and profitable alternative.

In the House of Commons, Early Day Motion (EDM) 612 from 2012, entitled "Cayman Turtle Centre" calls on the UK Government to condemn the practices of producing turtle meat for consumption and help assist the Centre in moving towards practices that promote the protection of turtles instead.

The captive breeding programme at the Cayman Turtle Centre has long-since attracted criticism from conservation groups who claim that the centre runs the risk of introducing infectious diseases into the wild by releasing turtles that have been bred in captive conditions. Experts also claim that programmes of this kind fail to address the root causes of turtle decline and efforts would be better spent tackling illegal poaching – a problem that still continues in the Cayman Islands. However a panel of four international turtle experts that inspected the Centre in December 2012 concluded that the Centre had a "positive conservation impact" because it provided turtle meat to local consumers thus alleviating poaching of the wild population, it augmented the local turtle nesting population through past turtle releases, it enabled applied research of the animals over four decades, and it increased awareness of marine turtle conservation.

In addition to claims of animal cruelty, the centre's business model has come under scrutiny for being uneconomical. According to WSPA, the Cayman Turtle Centre is making an average loss of over nine million Cayman dollars (approximately $10,976,000 US dollars) a year over the past five years and represents a huge burden for the tax payer. In April 2013 the Cayman Turtle Centre released data showing however that there are several positive indicators in its financial performance in recent years.

The Cayman Turtle Centre has denied the allegations of cruelty and congenital defects, and stands by its claim to have released 31,000 green sea turtles into the wild since it was first established. WSPA has stated that on average, the centre has only released 27 turtles per year since 2007. The Cayman Turtle Centre has confirmed that after Hurricane Michelle wiped out 75 per cent of its breeding population, the centre cut back the number of releases annually, but as stocks rebuild its recent releases have been increasing, with 75 turtles released in 2011 and 150 in 2012. The Cayman Islands Department of the Environment has released data showing that turtles released as hatchlings or yearlings from Cayman Turtle Centre decades ago, are becoming sexually mature and are returning as adults to nest on Grand Cayman's beaches. Between 1999 and 2003, the mean annual number of green sea turtle nests in Grand Cayman was 16.4. There has been a dramatic increase in the number of green sea turtle nests on the island in recent years, reaching a high of 181 green sea turtle nests in 2012. Sightings of "living-tagged" nesting turtles have confirmed that some of these nests were laid by turtles released from Cayman Turtle Centre.

== Image gallery ==
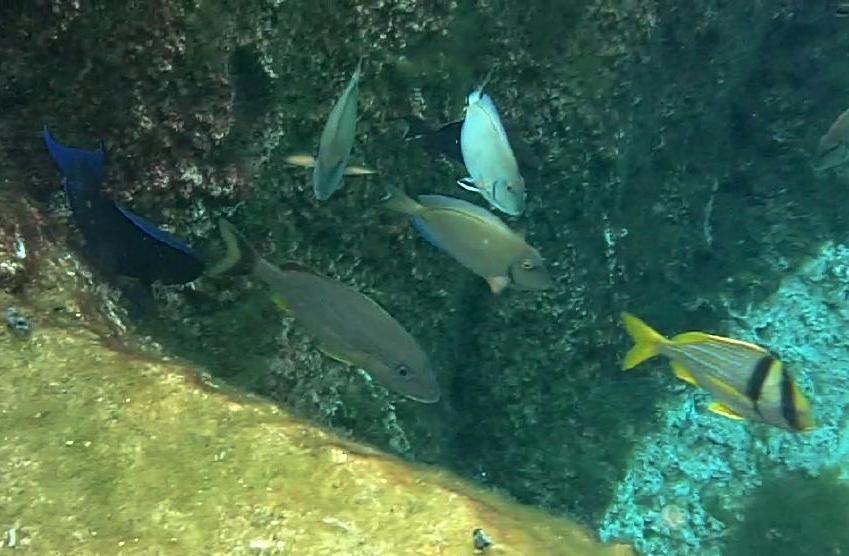
Reef fish seen in snorkeling lagoon at Cayman Turtle Centre

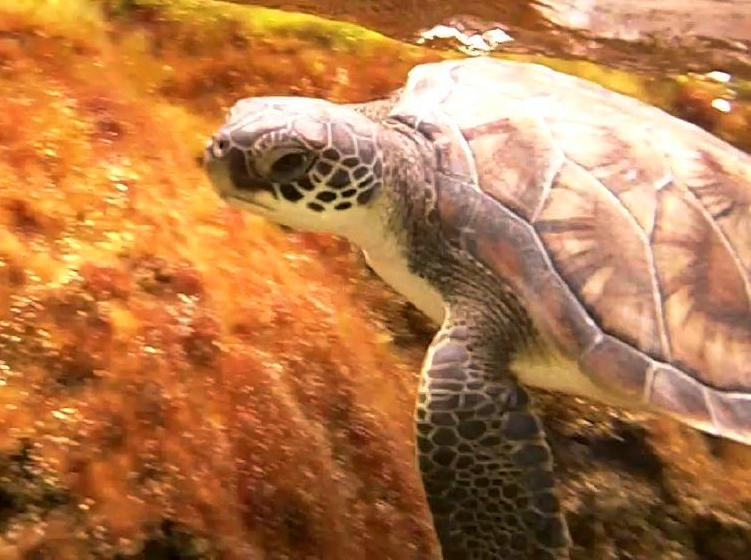
Green sea turtle swimming in snorkel lagoon at Cayman Turtle Centre

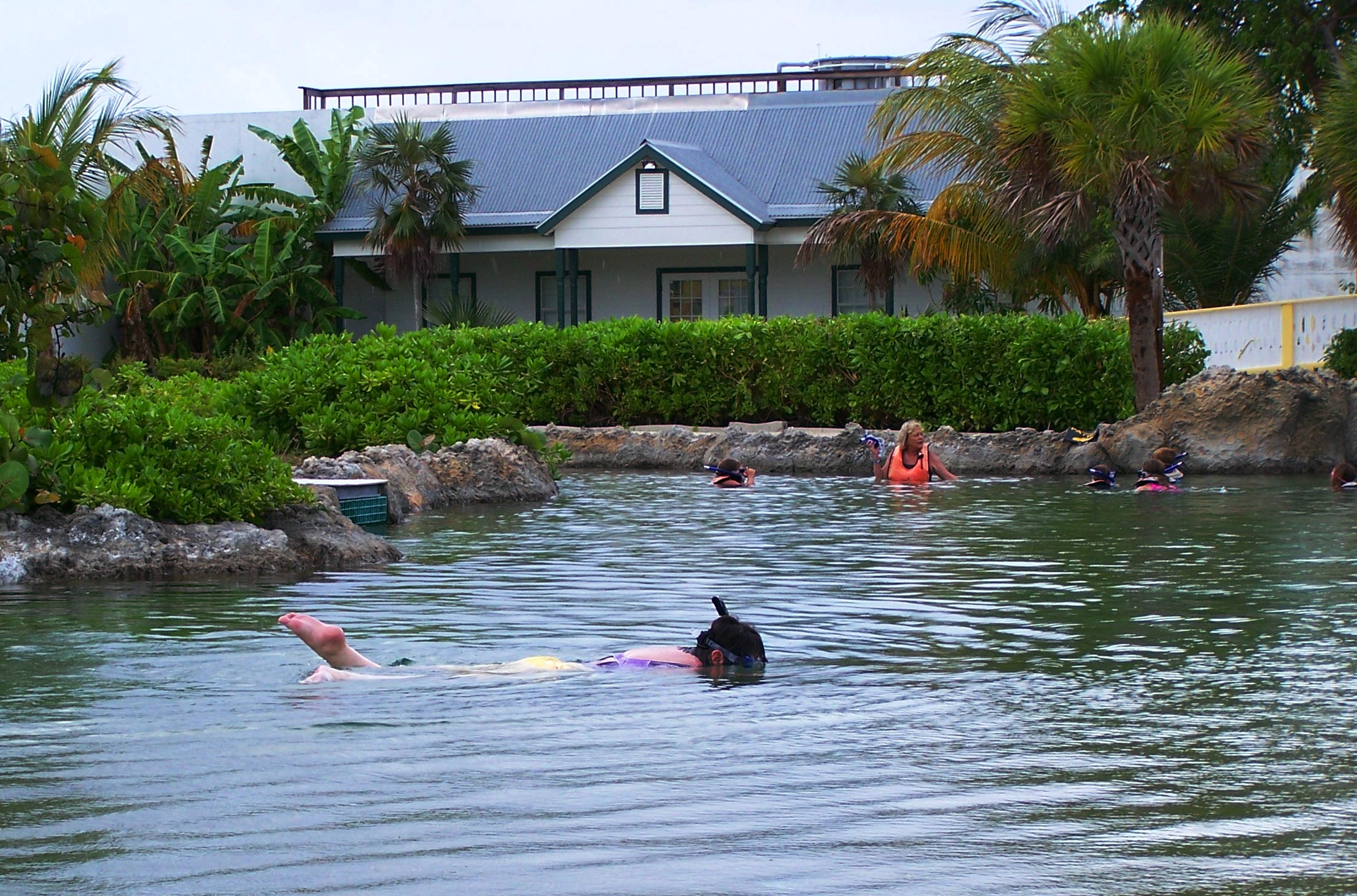
Visitors to Cayman Turtle Centre can swim with turtles and local reef fish

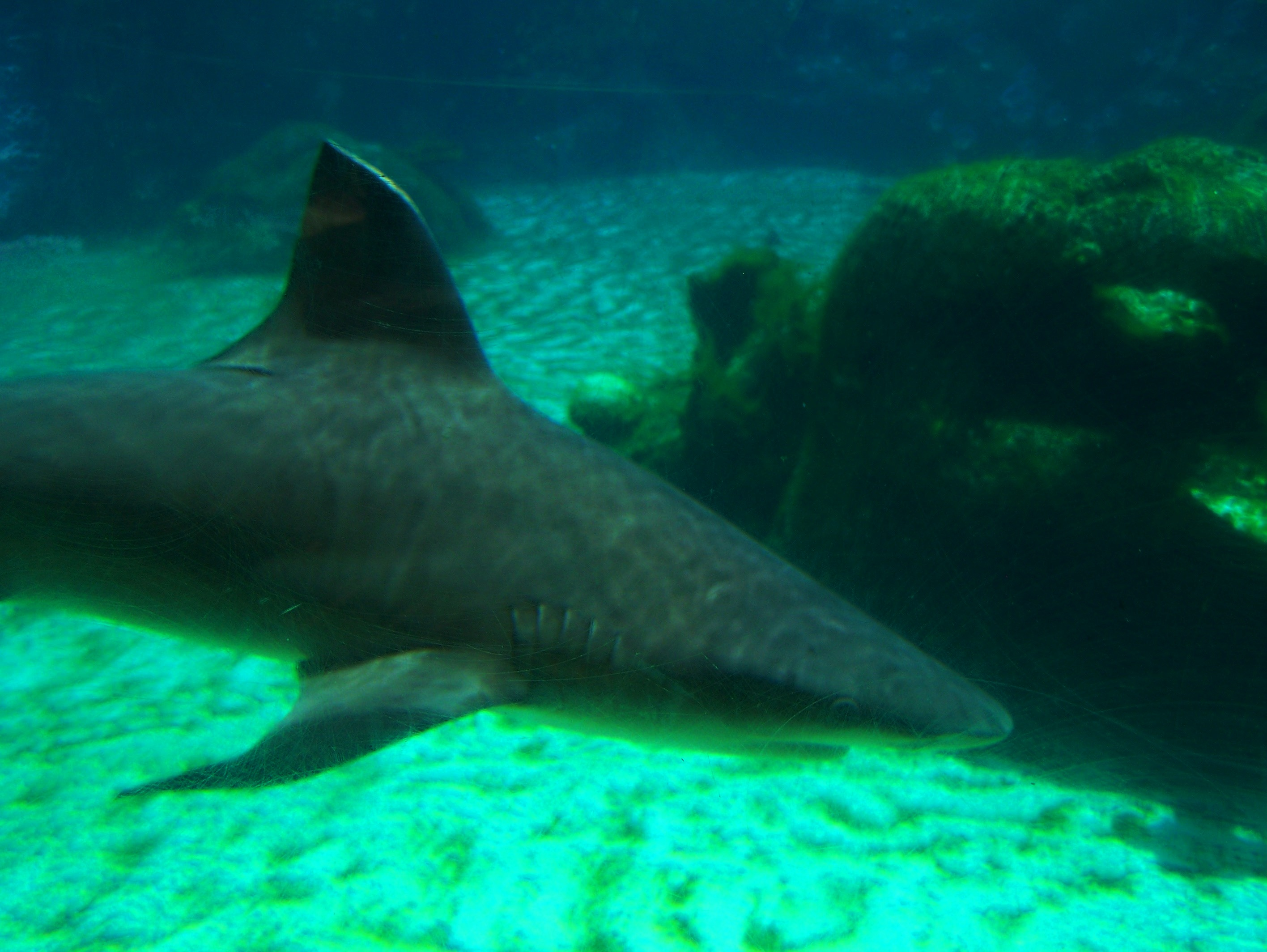
Reef Shark in Predator Tank at Cayman Turtle Centre

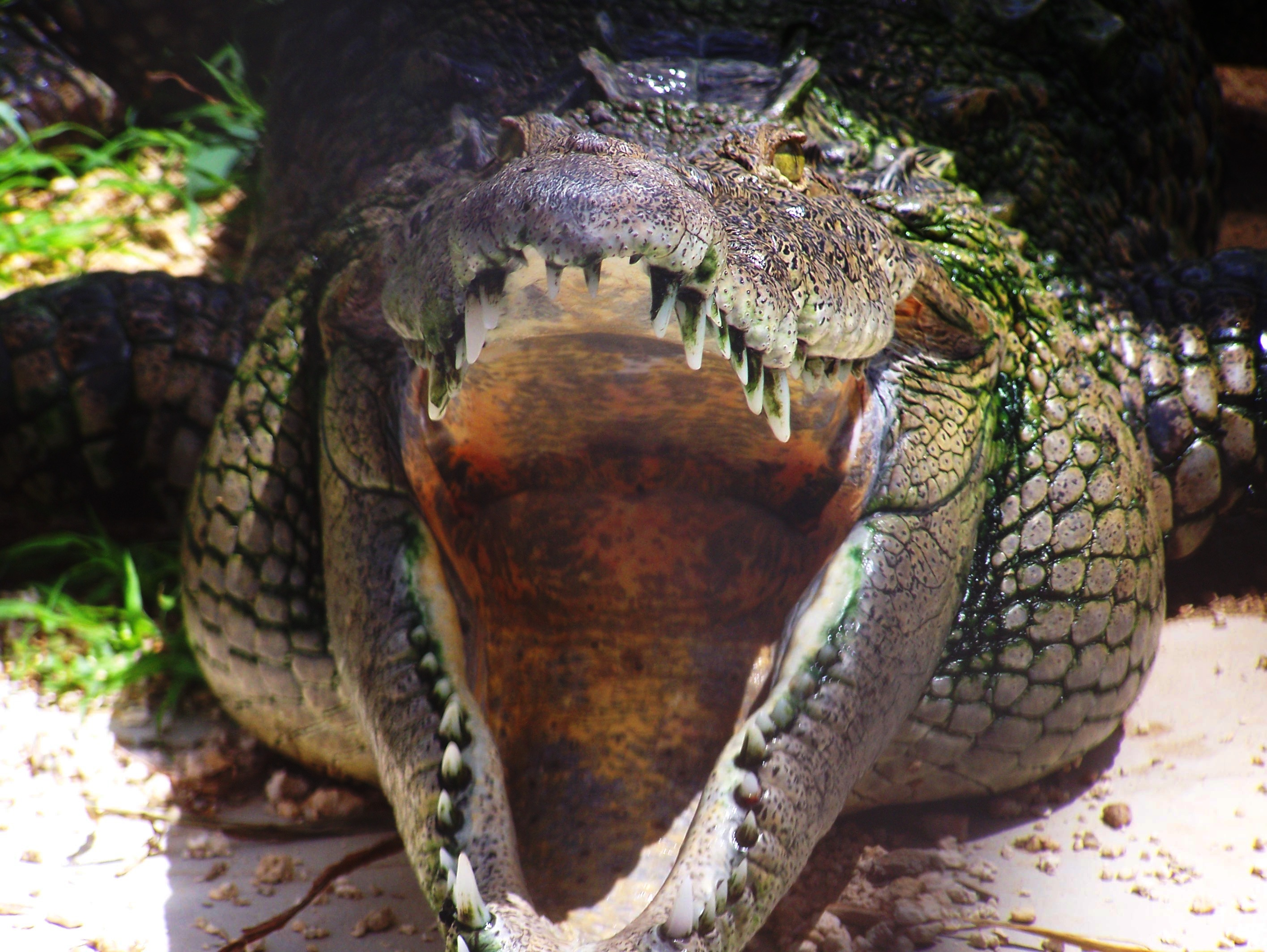
"Smiley", a hybrid crocodile of two species, housed at Cayman Turtle Centre
