= Andreas Ugland =

Norwegian ships engineer and shipowner (1925–2019)

- Born: 30 December 1925; Grimstad, Norway
- Died: 18 April 2019 (aged 93)
- Occupations: Engineer; Ship owner
- Children: Andreas Ove Ugland, Knut Axel Ugland, Johan Benad Ugland
- Awards: Order of St. Olav

Andreas Ugland (30 December 1925 – 18 April 2019) was a Norwegian ships engineer and shipowner.

He was born in Grimstad to ship owner Johan Milmar Ugland and Sara Lund. He was assigned with the family company Uglands Rederi, and after his father's death in 1960 he was running the company along with his brother. He was a board member of the Norwegian Maritime Authority for several years, and has been vice president of the Norwegian Shipowners' Association. He was decorated Knight, First Class of the Order of St. Olav in 1984.
