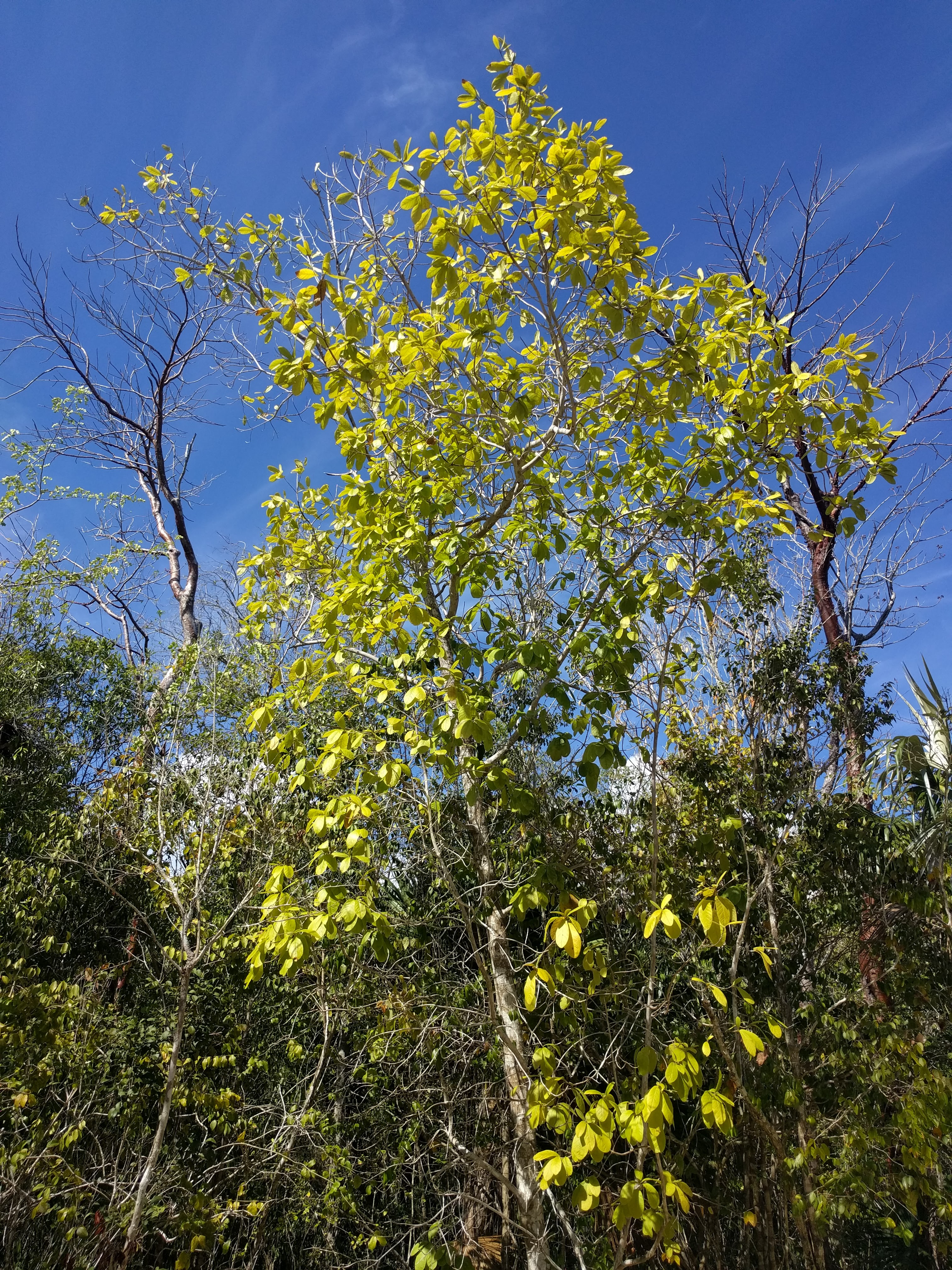

Conservation status
- Endangered (IUCN 2.3)

Scientific classification
- Kingdom: Plantae
- Clade: Tracheophytes
- Clade: Angiosperms
- Clade: Eudicots
- Clade: Rosids
- Order: Myrtales
- Family: Combretaceae
- Genus: Terminalia
- Species: T. eriostachya

Binomial name
- Terminalia eriostachya A.Rich.

= Terminalia eriostachya =

Species of tree

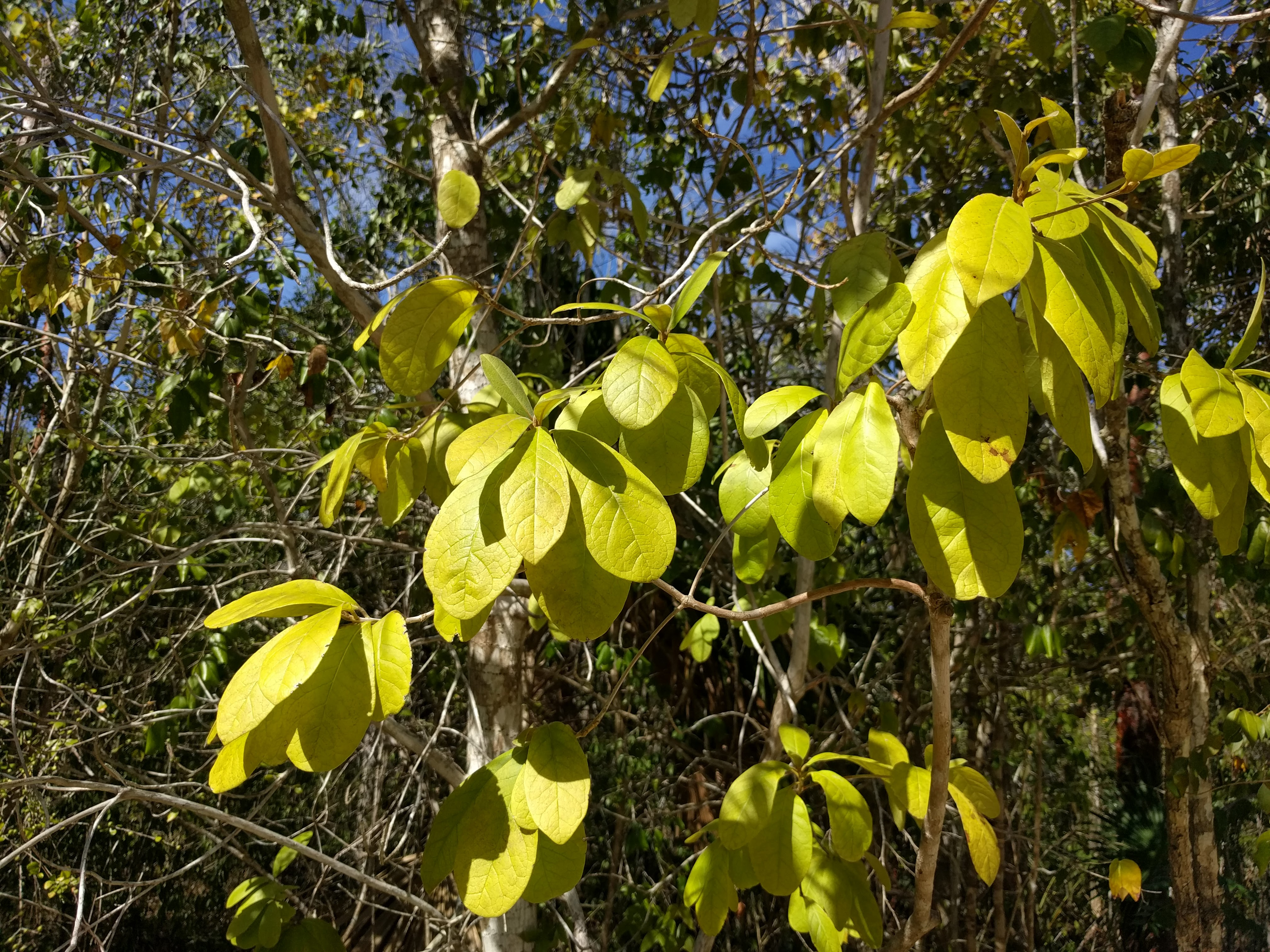
A close up of the leaves of T. eriostachya var. margaretiae in Queen Elizabeth II Botanic Park

Terminalia eriostachya, the black mastic, is a species of flowering tree in the leadwood family, Combretaceae. It is endemic to Cuba and the Cayman Islands. It is threatened by habitat loss.
