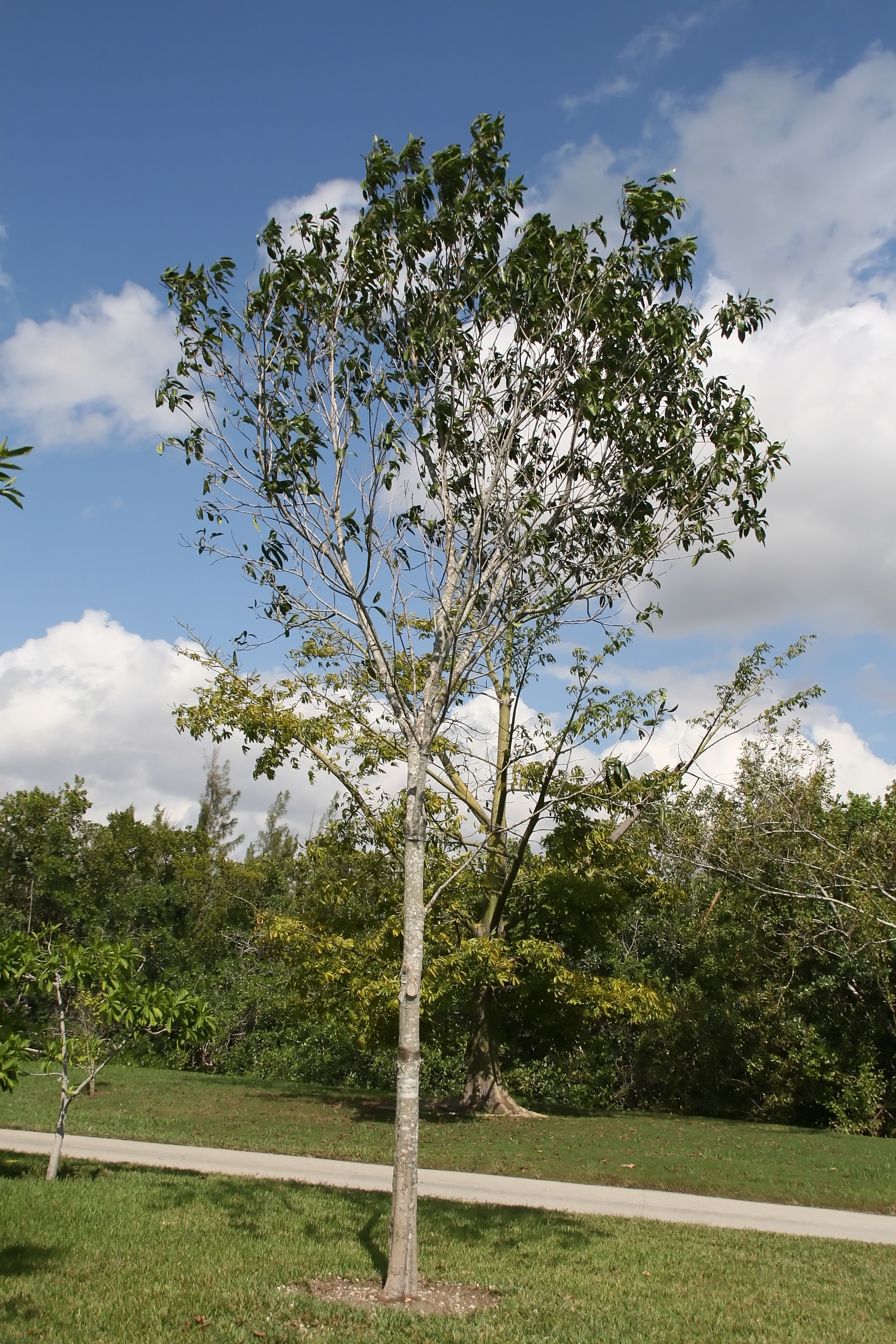
- Sideroxylon foetidissimum

Conservation status
- Least Concern (IUCN 3.1)

Scientific classification
- Kingdom: Plantae
- Clade: Tracheophytes
- Clade: Angiosperms
- Clade: Eudicots
- Clade: Asterids
- Order: Ericales
- Family: Sapotaceae
- Genus: Sideroxylon
- Species: S. foetidissimum

Binomial name
- Sideroxylon foetidissimum Jacq.

Synonyms
- Mastichodendron foetidissimum (Jacq.) H.J.Lam; Sideroxylon mastichodendron Jacq.

= Sideroxylon foetidissimum =

Species of tree

Sideroxylon foetidissimum, commonly known as false mastic or yellow mastic, is a species of flowering plant in the family Sapotaceae. It is native to Florida in the United States, the Caribbean, and northern Central America.
