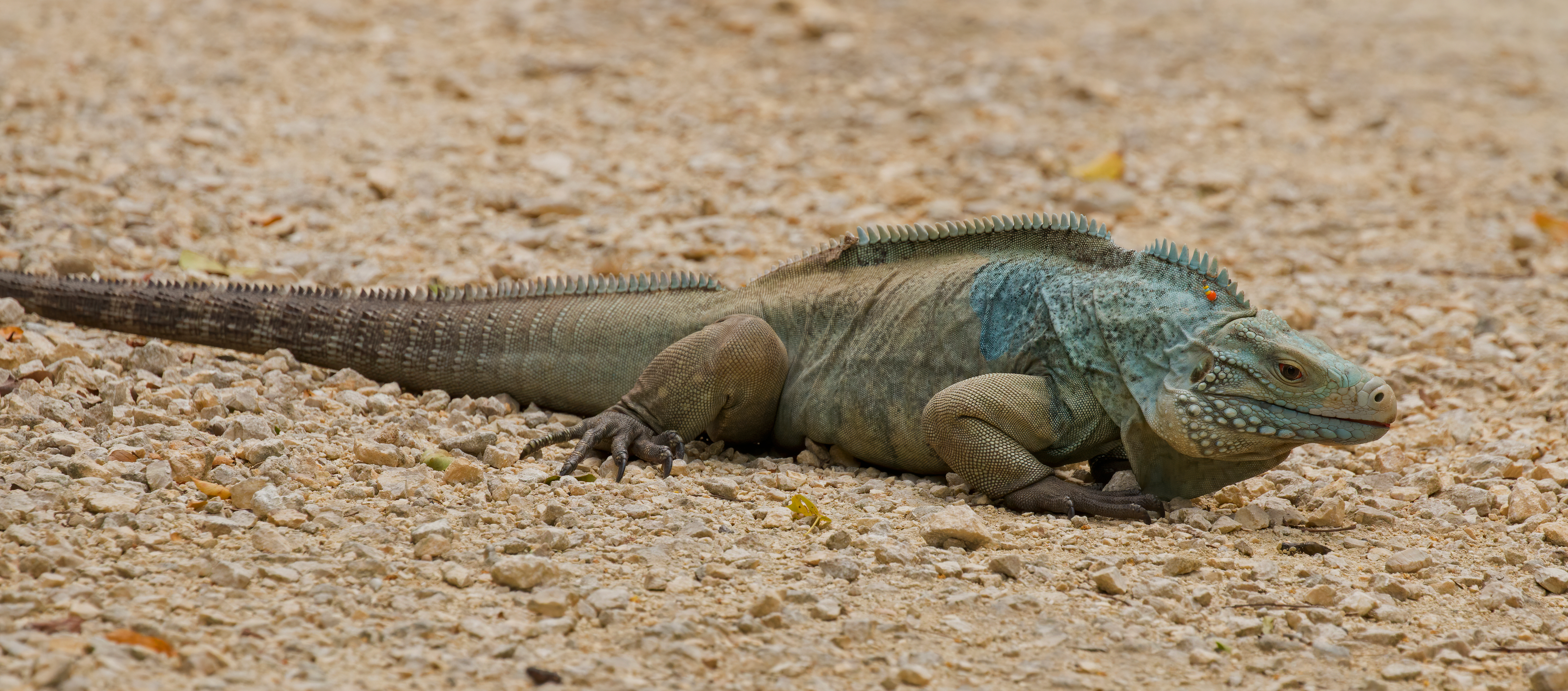
- A male in the Queen Elizabeth II Botanic Park, Grand Cayman

Conservation status
- Endangered (IUCN 3.1)
- CITES Appendix I

Scientific classification
- Kingdom: Animalia
- Phylum: Chordata
- Class: Reptilia
- Order: Squamata
- Suborder: Iguania
- Family: Iguanidae
- Genus: Cyclura
- Species: C. lewisi

Binomial name
- Cyclura lewisi (C. Grant, 1940)

Synonyms
- Cyclura macleayi lewisi C. Grant, 1940; Cyclura nubila lewisi (C. Grant, 1940) Schwartz & R. Thomas, 1975; Cyclura lewisi (C. Grant, 1940) F.J. Burton, 2004

= Blue iguana =

Species of reptile

The blue iguana (Cyclura lewisi), also known commonly as the Grand Cayman ground iguana, the Grand Cayman blue iguana, and the Cayman Island rock iguana, is an endangered species of lizard in the family Iguanidae. The species is endemic to the island of Grand Cayman. It was previously considered to be a subspecies of the Cuban iguana, Cyclura nubila, but in a 2004 article Frederic J. Burton reclassified it as a separate species because, according to him, the genetic differences discovered four years earlier between the different C. nubila populations warranted this interpretation. The blue iguana is one of the longest-living species of lizard (possibly up to 69 years).

The preferred habitat for the blue iguana is rocky, sunlit, open areas in dry forests or near the shore, as the females must dig holes in the sand to lay eggs in June and July. A possible second clutch is laid in September. The blue iguana's herbivorous diet includes plants, fruits, and flowers. Its color is tan to gray with a bluish cast that is more pronounced during the breeding season and more so in males. It is large and heavy-bodied with a dorsal crest of short spines running from the base of the neck to the end of the tail.

The blue iguana was possibly abundant before European colonization, but fewer than 15 animals remained in the wild by 2003, and this wild population was predicted to become extinct within the first decade of the 21st century. The species' decline is mainly being driven by predation by cats and dogs, and indirectly by reduction in suitable habitat as fruit farms are converted to pasture for cattle grazing. Hunting could have also played a role in their decline. Since 2004, hundreds of captive-bred animals have been released into a preserve on Grand Cayman run by a partnership headed by the Durrell Wildlife Conservation Trust, in an attempt to save the species. At least five non-profit organizations are working with the government of the Cayman Islands to ensure the survival of the blue iguana.

== Etymology and taxonomy ==
The specific name, lewisi, commemorates the surname of the scientist who collected the holotype of this species, Charles Bernard Lewis.

The closest relatives of the blue iguana are the Cuban iguana (Cyclura nubila) and the Northern Bahamian rock iguana (C. cychlura). The blue iguana can be genetically distinguished from the subspecies found on Little Cayman and Cayman Brac known as C. nubila caymanensis, although it can interbreed with this subspecies and produce fertile offspring.

In 1938, Lewis of the Institute of Jamaica joined an Oxford University biological expedition to the Cayman Islands. Lewis obtained two blue iguanas, a male and a female, which were later lodged with the Natural History Museum, London. Chapman Grant, in an article published in 1940, formally described the blue iguana as a separate taxon for the first time, classifying it as the trinomial C. macleayi lewisi. Albert Schwartz and Richard Thomas reclassified it as C. nubila lewisi in 1975, making it a subspecies of the Cuban iguana. In his 2004 article Frederick Burton repeatedly states Schwartz and Carey reclassified it in a 1977 publication, but he is mistaken.

Burton, who runs the captive breeding program on the island, reclassified the blue iguana as a distinct species in 2004. Although it has almost identical head scale counts and patterns as C. nubila, most individuals of this taxon often have five auricular spines as opposed to four in caymanensis, although this is not diagnostic, and individuals of the nominate subspecies show either morphology in similar proportions. Also most lewisi have an extra pair of scales behind the prefrontals, although not always, and individuals from the other populations may also have these. Thus Burton concluded that using scale characteristics, these three taxa could not be told apart in a consistent manner. According to him, the most important difference between the lewisi population and the other two is skin color. Although skin color is a variable characteristic that is usually considered unsatisfactory in taxonomy, Burton thought that in this instance it might be appropriate. Although all three taxa hatch with the same color, as they grow older lewisi becomes more uniformly bluish, whereas the other taxa can be more variable in coloration, although Burton states that this characteristic is not reliable in many circumstances, such as rainy weather. Other reasons Burton gave for recognising lewisi as a separate species were geography, there is at least 108 kilometres separating the forms, which Burton then interpreted to mean that the populations were reproductively isolated, despite there being no reproductive barriers between the populations. Grant reported seeing caymanensis on Grand Cayman in 1940, but Burton states that this was likely a mistaken sighting made during rainy weather. Lastly Burton points to mitochondrial DNA analysis performed by Catherine Malone et al. in 2000; although the sample size was extremely small and there was some ambiguity, the different populations did have different haplotypes. Although Malone et al. found C. nubila sensu lato to be monophyletic, Burton claimed lewisi could be separated from the other two taxa without rendering C. nubila polyphyletic. Although none of this might be used to traditionally delineate a population as a species, he proposed using the "general lineage concept" introduced by Kevin de Queiroz in 1998 to do so anyway.

== Common names ==
C. lewisi was originally called the Grand Cayman rock iguana, or Grand Cayman blue rock iguana. After separating this population taxonomically from the other Cayman Islands rock iguanas, Burton proposed a set of new vernacular names for the population in 2004: Grand Cayman blue iguana, Cayman blue iguana or for local colloquial use he proposed the simple abbreviated blue iguana.

Note that the name "blue iguana" is also used for bright blue forms of the green iguana, Iguana iguana.

== Description ==
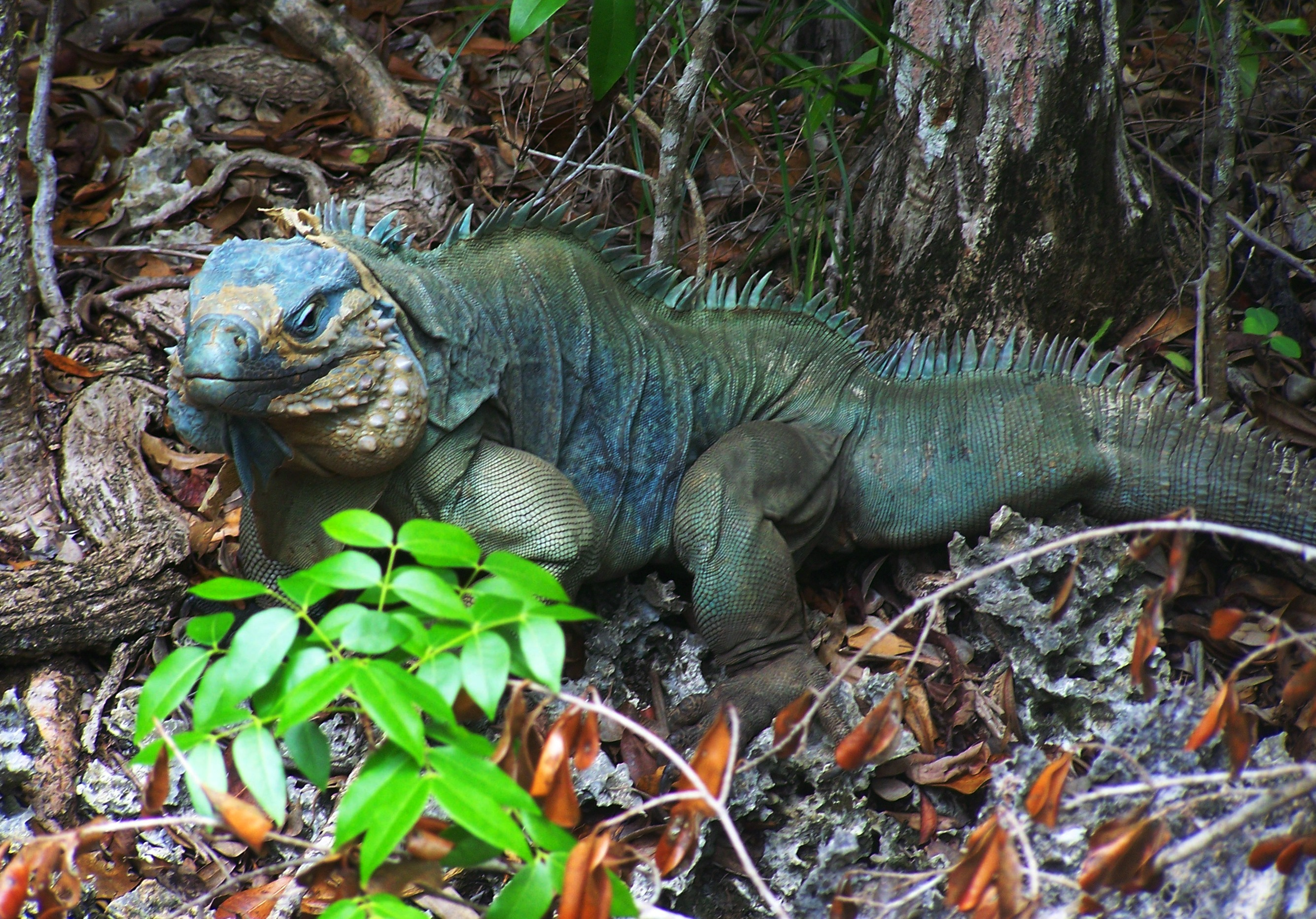
Blue iguana in forest off Wilderness Trail in Queen Elizabeth II Botanic Park, Grand Cayman

An example of island gigantism, the blue iguana is the largest native land animal on Grand Cayman with a total nose-to-tail length of 5 ft (1.5 m) and weighing as much as 30 lb (14 kg). This is among the largest species of lizards in the Western Hemisphere. The largest of the Cyclura, its body length is 20–30 in (510–760 mm) with a tail equal in length. The blue iguana's toes are articulated to be efficient in digging and climbing trees. The mature male's skin color ranges from dark grey to turquoise blue, whereas the female is more olive green to pale blue. Young animals tend to be uniformly dark brown or green with faint darker banding. When they first emerge from the nest, the neonates have an intricate pattern of eight dark dorsal chevrons from the crest of their necks to their pelvic area. These markings fade by the time the animal is one year old, changing to mottled gray and cream and eventually giving way to blue as adults. The adult blue iguana is typically dark gray, matching the karst rock of its landscape. The animal changes its color to blue when it is in the presence of other iguanas to signal and establish territory. The blue color is more pronounced in males of the species. Its distinctive black feet contrast with its lighter overall body color. The blue iguana's eyes have a golden iris and red sclera.

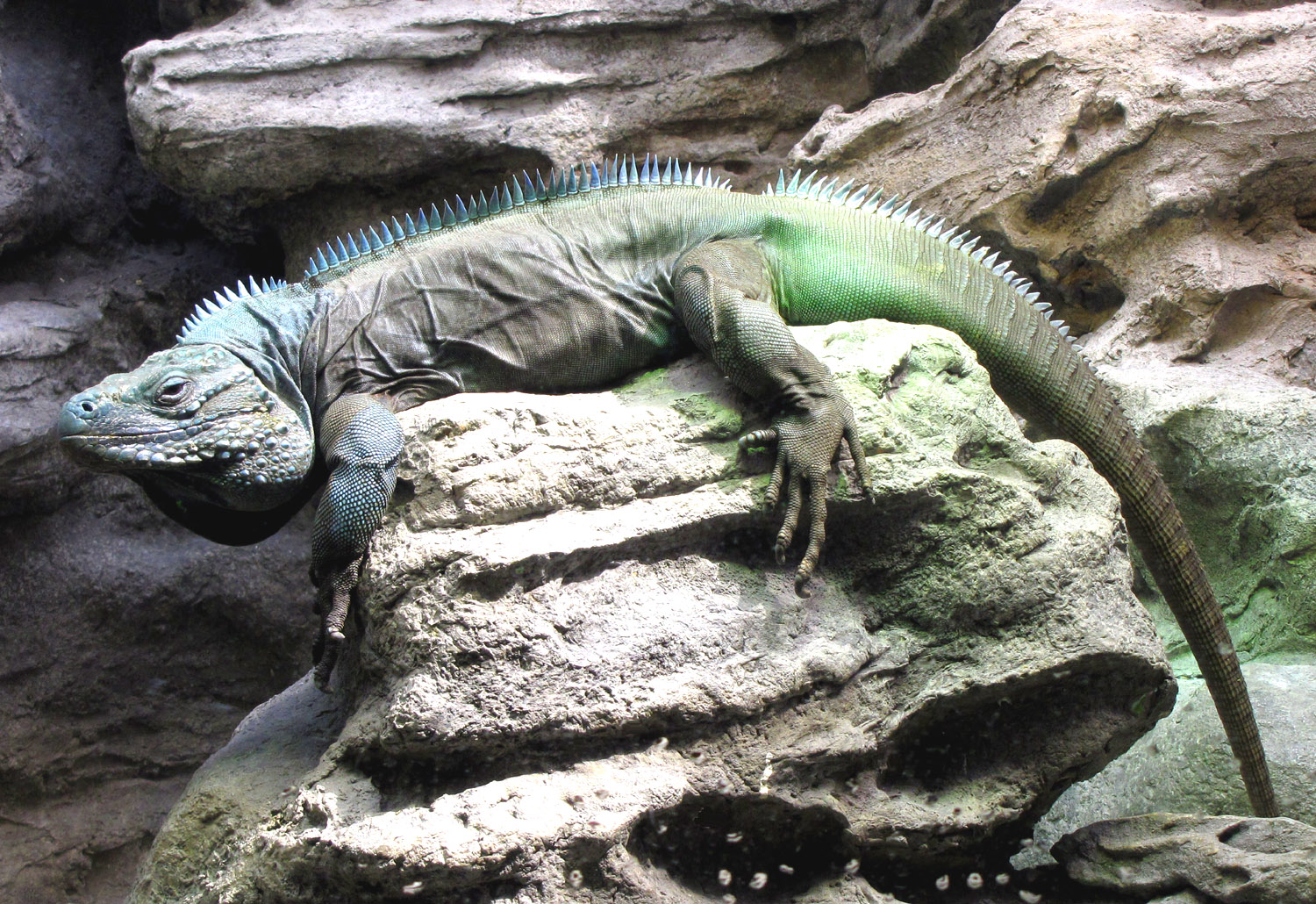
Grand Cayman blue iguana

The blue iguana is sexually dimorphic; males are larger and have more prominent dorsal crests as well as larger femoral pores on their thighs, which are used to release pheromones. The male is larger than the female by one third of his body size.

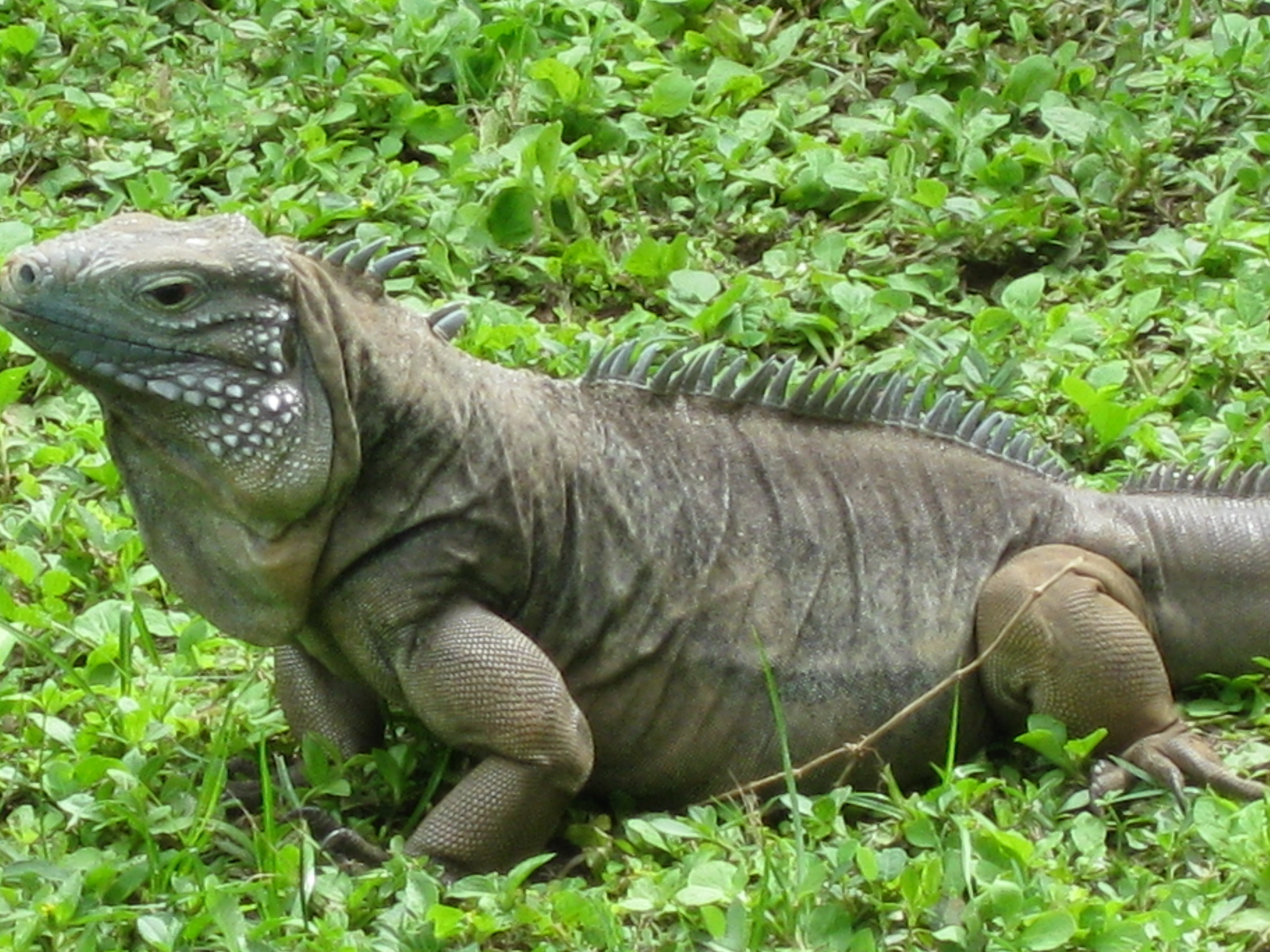
A female blue iguana sunning herself at the Royal Botanical Park

== Distribution ==
The blue iguana is endemic to the island of Grand Cayman. As of 2012, the population can be found throughout the island Grand Cayman excluding the urban areas of Bodden Town, Gun Bay, Seven Mile Beach and West Bay. One theory for how the taxon ended up on the island is that a single female Cuban iguana, C. nubila nubila, with eggs inside her drifted across the sea, perhaps during a storm. Sometimes the Lesser Caymans iguana, C. nubila caymanensis, has been found on Grand Cayman.

== Ecology ==
=== Habitat ===
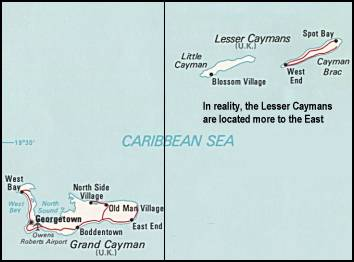
The blue iguana lives on Grand Cayman, the largest and westernmost of the Cayman Islands southwest of Cuba.

The blue iguana is found only on the island of Grand Cayman. Comparison with other Cyclura species in the region strongly suggests that there was once a coastal population of blue iguanas which was gradually displaced or extirpated by human settlements and the construction of roads. The blue iguana now only occurs inland in natural xerophytic shrubland and along the interfaces between farm clearings, roads, and gardens and closed-canopy dry forest or shrubland. The interior population is believed to have been attracted to agricultural clearings and fruit farms which provide thermoregulatory opportunities, herbaceous browse, fallen fruit, and nesting soil, but this brought the blue iguana into contact with humans and feral animals. Females often migrate to coastal areas to nest. Blue iguanas released into the Queen Elizabeth II Botanic Park on Grand Cayman were radiotracked in 2004 to determine the home range for each animal. Females were found to occupy territories of 0.6 acres (2,400 m^{2}) and males an average of 1.4 acres (5,700 m^{2}) with overlap in common territories, indicating that they choose to maintain a population density of four to five animals per hectare.

The blue iguana occupies rock holes and tree cavities, and as an adult is primarily terrestrial. Although not known to be arboreal, it has been observed climbing trees 15 feet (4.6 m) and higher. Younger individuals tend to be more arboreal.

These iguanas spend very little time during the day in a retreat, before finally retreating at the end of the day.

=== Diet ===
Like all Cyclura species, the blue iguana is primarily herbivorous, consuming leaves, stems, flowers, nuts, and fruits from over 45 species of plants. The diet is very rarely supplemented with insects, crabs, slugs, and fungi. Blue iguanas have also been observed ingesting small rocks, soil, feces, and bits of shedding.

=== Predators ===
Hatchlings are preyed upon by the native snake Cubophis caymanus. The adults have no natural predators.

=== Longevity ===
Longevity in the wild is unknown but is presumed to be many decades. A blue iguana named "Godzilla" captured on Grand Cayman in 1950 by naturalist Ira Thompson was imported to the United States in 1985 by Ramon Noegel and sold to reptile importer and breeder, Tom Crutchfield in 1990. Crutchfield donated Godzilla to the Gladys Porter Zoo in Brownsville, Texas in 1997 and the lizard remained there until its death in 2004. Thompson estimated Godzilla to be 15 years of age at the time of his capture. At an estimated 69 years of age (54 of which were spent in captivity), Godzilla may be the world's longest-living lizard for which there is reliable record. A closely related Lesser Caymans iguana (C. nubila caymanensis) has been documented as living 33 years in captivity.

=== Reproduction ===
Mating occurs from May through June. Copulation is preceded by numerous head-bobs on the part of the male, who then circles around behind the female and grasps the nape of her neck. He then attempts to restrain the female in order to manoeuvre his tail under hers to position himself for intromission (copulation). Copulation generally lasts from 30 to 90 seconds, and a pair is rarely observed mating more than once or twice a day. A clutch of 1 to 21 eggs is usually laid in June or July depending on the size and age of the female, in nests excavated in pockets of earth exposed to the sun. Several exploratory nests are begun before one is completed. These burrows can range from 16 inches (0.41 m) to over 60 inches (1.5 m) in length, with an enlarged chamber at its terminal portion to allow the female to turn around. The temperature within nests that have been monitored by researchers remained a constant 32 °C (90 °F) throughout the incubation period which ranges from 65 to 90 days. The blue iguana's eggs are among the largest laid by any lizard.

Individuals are aggressively territorial from the age of about three months onward. They typically reach sexual maturity after four years of age in captivity.

== Conservation ==
=== Endangered status ===
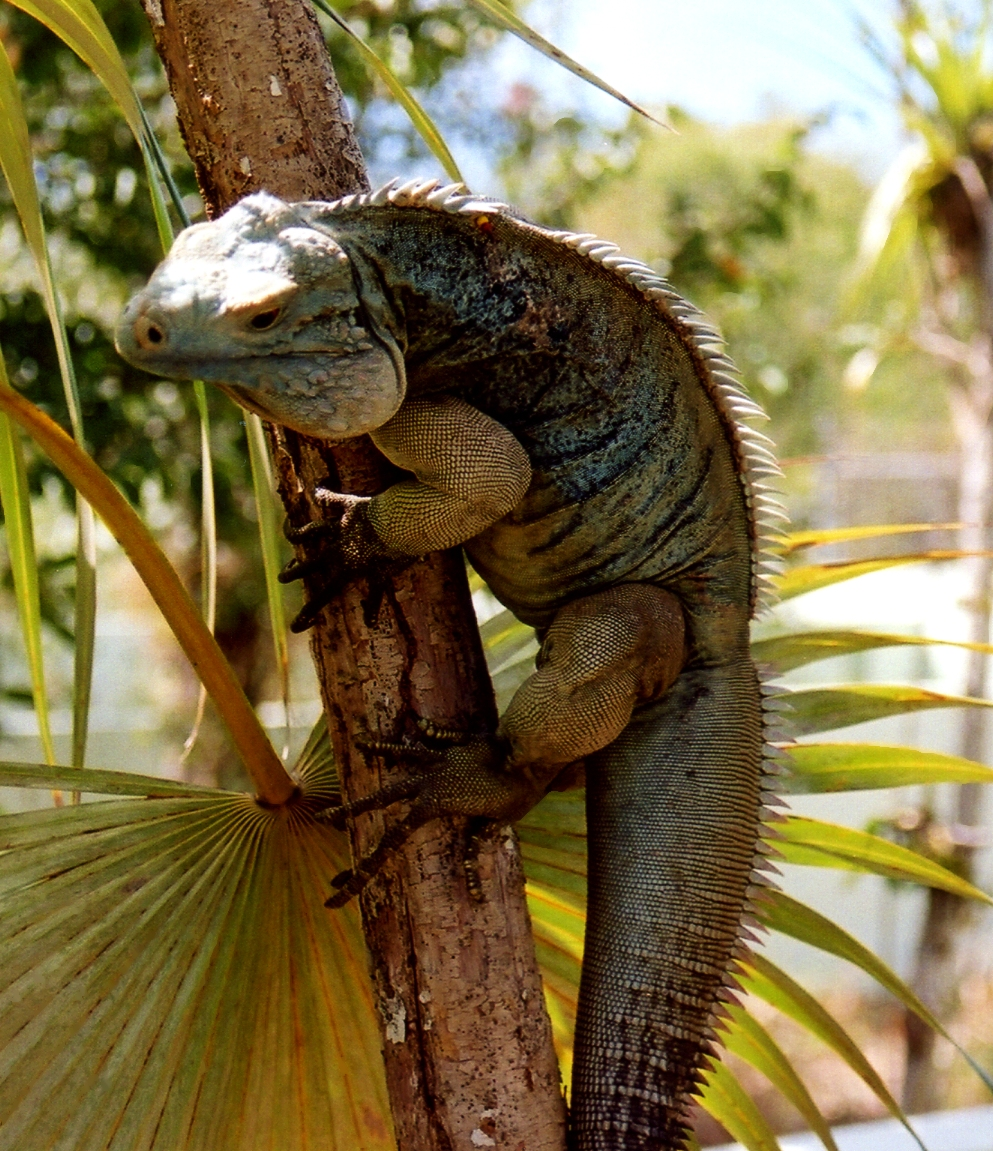
A blue iguana on Grand Cayman

The blue iguana is listed as endangered on the IUCN Red List. In 1988 the British researcher Roger Avery spent two weeks on the island and only observed three animals. Surveys in 2003 indicated a total population in the range of 5–15 individuals. In 2006 the iguana was one of the most endangered lizards on Earth.

Restored free-roaming subpopulations in the Queen Elizabeth II Botanic Park and the Salina Reserve numbered approximately 125 individuals in total after an initial release in December 2005. The restored subpopulation in the Queen Elizabeth II Botanic Park has been breeding since 2001, and the subpopulation in the Salina Reserve was deemed to be breeding in 2006 after a nest of three hatched eggs was discovered in the wild. In April 2007, after another large-scale release, there were 299 blue iguanas living in the wild, with hundreds more being raised in captivity on Grand Cayman. In late 2012, the blue iguana recovery program estimated that the wild population had risen to approximately 750 individuals, and the IUCN subsequently downlisted the species from critically endangered to endangered.

International trade in the species is regulated due to its listing on Appendix I of the Convention on International Trade in Endangered Species.

=== Causes of decline ===
The species is nearly extinct, and I doubt that more than a dozen individuals still exist on the island.... East End people say that since 1925 the "guanas"[sic] have become so scarce that it is no longer worth their while to hunt them.

— Chapman Grant, The Herpetology of the Cayman Islands

Habitat destruction is the main factor threatening extinction for this iguana. Land clearance within remnant habitat is occurring for agriculture, road construction, and real estate development and speculation. The conversion of traditional crop lands to cattle pasture is eliminating secondary blue iguana habitat.

Predation and injury to hatchlings by rats, to hatchlings and sub-adults by feral cats, and killing of adults by pet dogs are all placing severe pressure on the remaining wild population. Automobiles and motorscooters are an increasing cause of mortality as the iguanas rarely survive the collisions. Trapping and shooting is a comparatively minor concern, and has stopped according to the IUCN in 2012; however, before 1995, occasional trapping may have occurred.

The common green iguana (Iguana iguana) has been introduced from Honduras and is well-established on Grand Cayman as an invasive species. It far outnumbers the native blue iguana. No direct negative consequences on the blue iguana due to this introduction are known, but the mere presence of the green iguana confuses public attitudes and understanding. For example, the people of the island are told that blue iguanas are endangered and rare, but the green iguana looks very similar and are quite common in suburban areas.

In 2008, six blue iguanas were found dead in the preserve within Queen Elizabeth II Botanic Park on Grand Cayman. The iguanas were apparently killed by human vandals armed with knives and two of the slaughtered animals were gravid females about to lay eggs.

The wild population of blue iguanas had been reduced from a near island-wide distribution to a non-viable, fragmented remnant. By 2001 no young hatched in the unmanaged wild population were surviving to breeding age, meaning the population was functionally extinct, with only five animals remaining in the wild.

=== Recovery efforts ===
In 1990, the American Zoo and Aquarium Association designated the genus Cyclura as their highest priority for conservation. Their first project was an in situ captive breeding program for the blue iguana.

One of the early difficulties encountered was that the captive stock of the early 1990s was found not to be pure. It was discovered through DNA analysis that the captive population contained a number of animals that were hybrids with Cyclura nubila caymanensis. These hybrids were sterilized by means of hemipenectomy (surgical removal of the hemipenis), so that the program would contain only pure-breeds. This program was created to determine the exact genealogies of the limited gene pool of the remaining animals and DNA analysis revealed that the entire North American captive population was descended from a single pair of animals.

As a hedge against disaster striking the blue iguana population on Grand Cayman, in 2004 an ex situ captive population was established in 25 zoos in the US. A minimum of 20 founder lines represented by at least 225 individuals is being maintained by captive breeding and recorded in a studbook for the species by Tandora Grant of the San Diego Zoo's Center for Conservation and Research for Endangered Species. By 2002 the Indianapolis Zoo had success with breeding the blue iguana in captivity twice since the year 2000.

In October 2006, hatchlings were released into the wild for the first time to boost the species and help bring them back from the brink of extinction. Each released blue iguana wears a string of colored beads through its nuchal crest for visual identification at a distance, backed up by an implanted microchip and a high-resolution photograph of its head scales. Head scale patterns are as unique among blue iguanas as fingerprints are among humans.

The blue iguana is established in captivity, both in public and private collections. There are very few pure-bred animals in private collections, animals in captive breeding programs are often hybrids with the Lesser Caymans Iguana (C. nubila caymanensis) and occasional hybrids with the Cuban Iguana (C. nubila nubila). Breeding in the pet trade minimizes the demand for wild-caught specimens.

==== Blue Iguana Recovery Programme ====
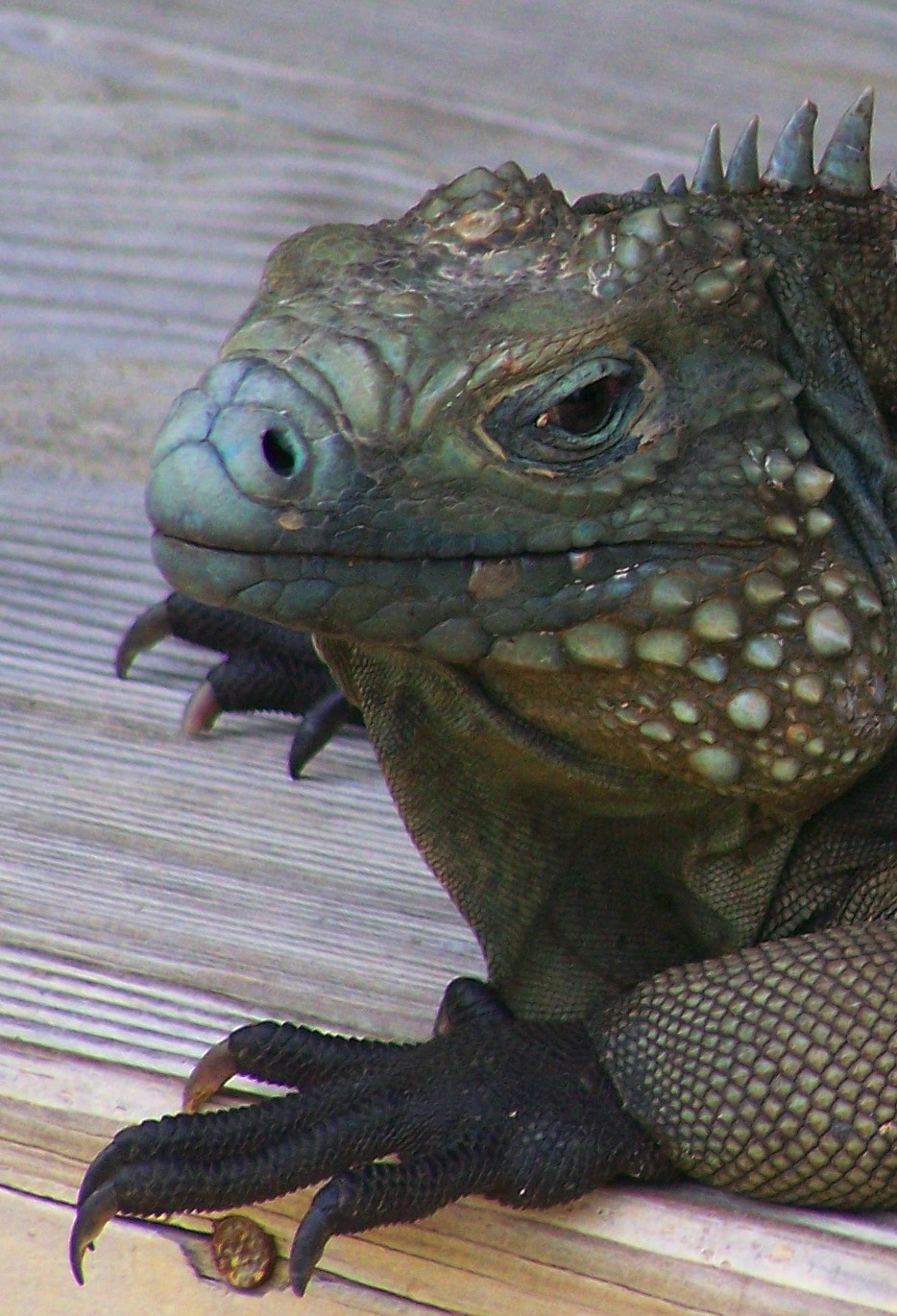
Blue iguana resting on park bench off Wilderness Trail at QE II Botanic Park

The Blue Iguana Recovery Programme grew from a small project started in 1990 within the National Trust for the Cayman Islands. It is now a partnership, linking the Trust with the Cayman Islands Department of Environment, National Trust Cayman Islands, Queen Elizabeth II Botanic Park, Durrell Wildlife Conservation Trust, International Reptile Conservation Foundation, IRCF, and the European Commission. This program operates under a special exemption from provisions in the Animals Law of the Cayman Islands, which normally would make it illegal for anyone to kill, capture, or keep iguanas. BIRP's conservation strategy involves generating large numbers of genetically diverse hatchlings, headstarting them for two years so that their chance of survival in the wild is high, and using these animals to rebuild a series of wild sub-populations in protected, managed natural areas. A rapid numerical increase from a maximum possible number of founding stock is sought to minimize loss of genetic diversity caused by a population bottleneck.

Restored sub-populations are present in two non-contiguous areas—the Salina Reserve and the Queen Elizabeth II Botanic Park. Habitat protection is still vital, as the Salina Reserve has only 88 acres (360,000 m^{2}) of dry shrubland, which is not enough to sustain the 1,000 blue iguanas that were planned to be restored to the wild. The 2001 plan called for additional sub-populations to be restored in one or more other areas. When the wild sub-populations have reached the carrying capacity of their respective protected areas, release of head-started animals will be phased out.

The overall captive population is likely to remain genetically fragmented in the long term. To maintain gene flow, individuals should be translocated between zoos.

According to the 2001 plan, breeding of blue iguanas in the wild will require indefinite future management. To sustain this activity, a range of commercial activities was hoped to generate the required funding. An education and awareness effort in 2007 was meant to ensure local involvement and support.

In April 2019, one iguana laid 18 eggs for possible hatching. Any survivals will be the first successful breeding since 2015.
