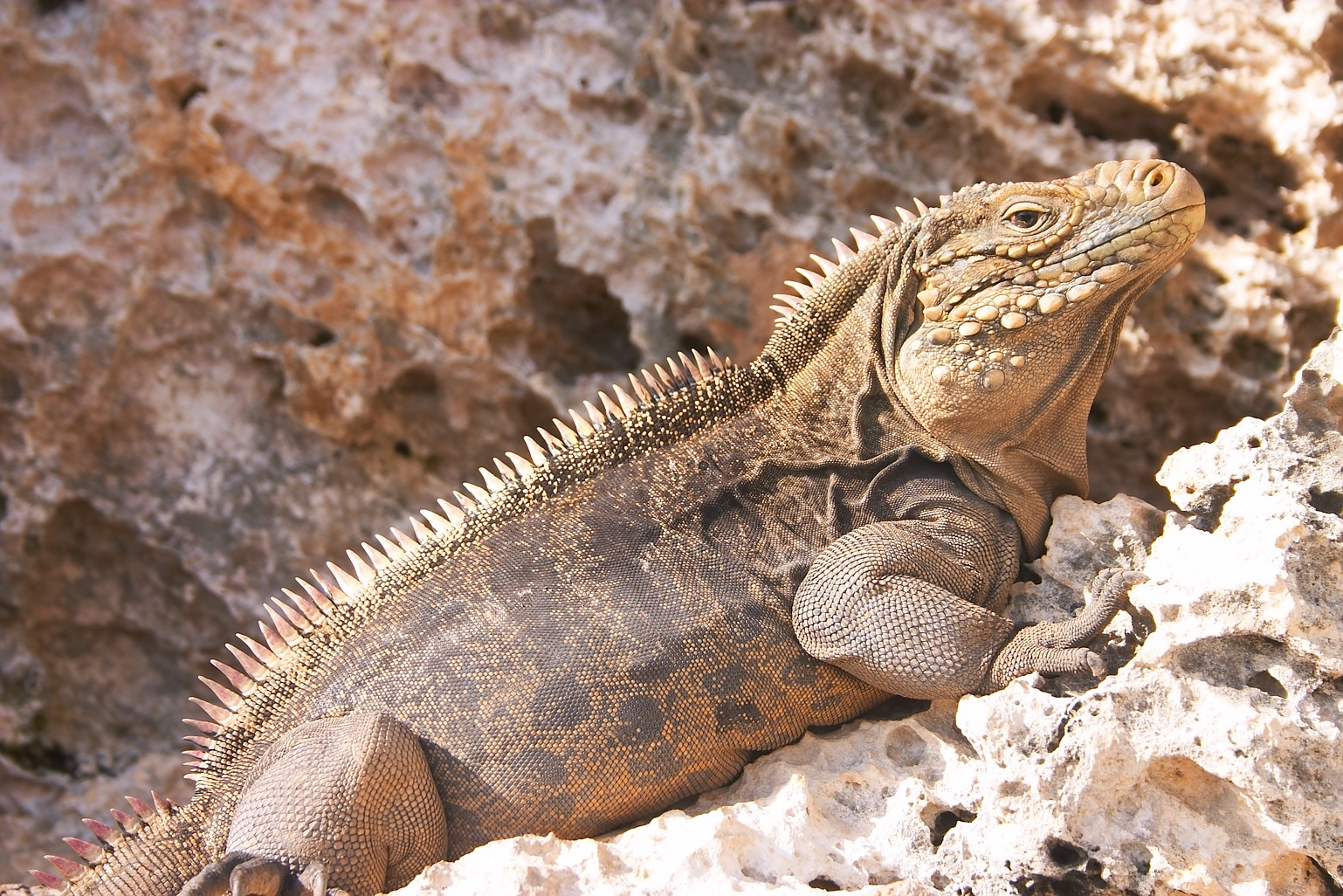

Conservation status
- Vulnerable (IUCN 2.3)
- CITES Appendix I

Scientific classification
- Kingdom: Animalia
- Phylum: Chordata
- Class: Reptilia
- Order: Squamata
- Suborder: Iguania
- Family: Iguanidae
- Genus: Cyclura
- Species: C. nubila

Binomial name
- Cyclura nubila (Gray, 1831)

Subspecies
- Cyclura nubila caymanensis; Cyclura nubila nubila

= Cyclura nubila =

Cuban rock iguana

Species of reptile

The Cuban rock iguana (Cyclura nubila), also known as the Cuban ground iguana or Cuban iguana, is a species of lizard of the iguana family. It is the second largest of the West Indian rock iguanas (genus Cyclura), one of the most endangered groups of lizards. A herbivorous species with a thick tail and spiked jowls, it is one of the largest lizards in the Caribbean.

The Cuban iguana is distributed throughout the mainland of Cuba and its surrounding islets with a feral population thriving on Isla Magueyes, Puerto Rico. A subspecies is found on the Cayman Islands of Little Cayman and Cayman Brac. Females guard their nest sites and one population nests in sites excavated by Cuban crocodiles. As a defence measure, the Cuban iguana often makes its home within or near prickly-pear cacti.

The numbers of iguanas have been bolstered as a result of captive-breeding and other conservation programs. C. nubila has been used to study evolution and animal communication, and its captive-breeding program has been a model for other endangered lizards in the Caribbean.

== Taxonomy ==
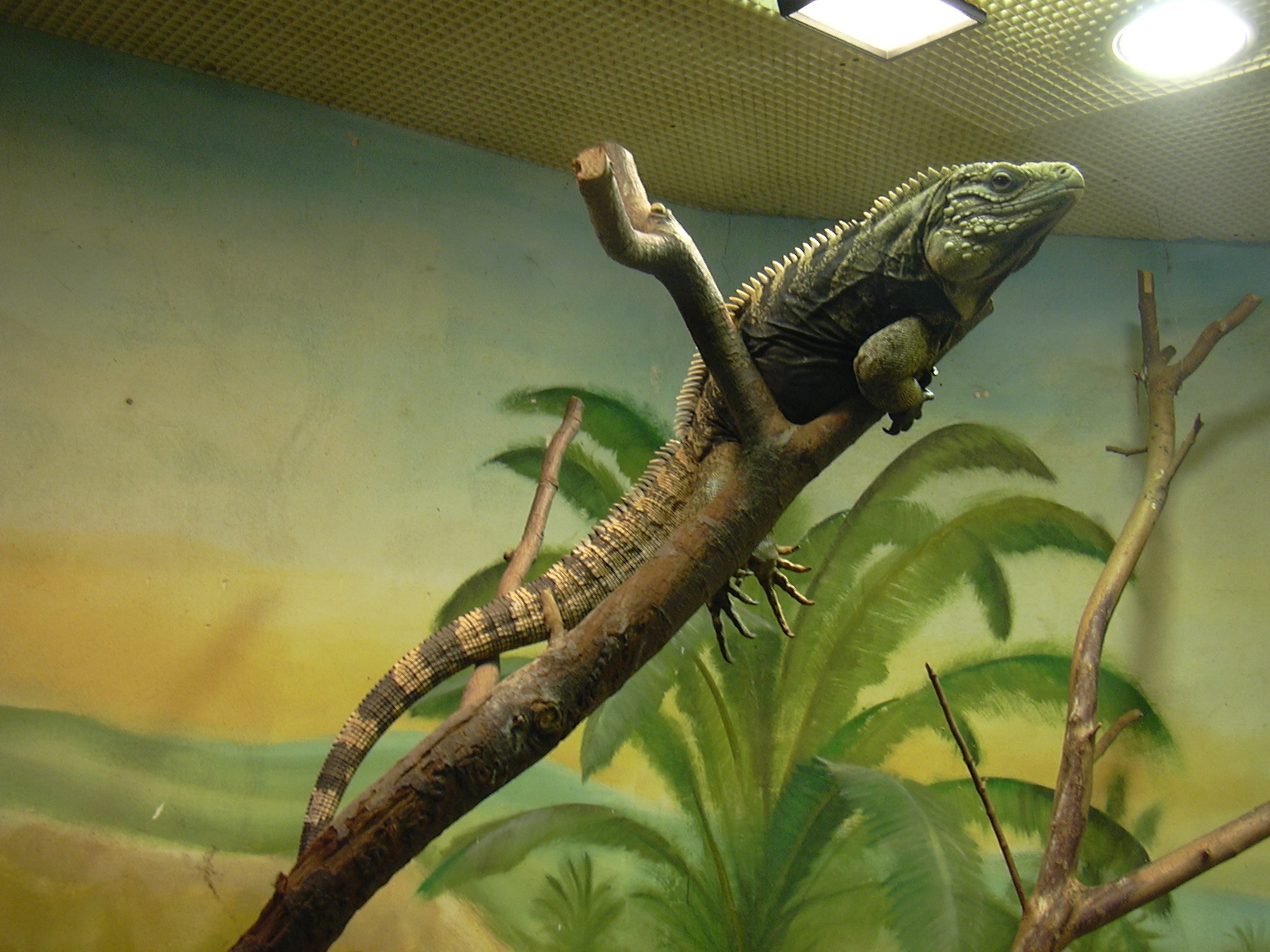
In the Ústí nad Labem Zoo

This species was first introduced to scientific literature by British zoologist Edward Griffith in his rather rewritten translation of George Cuvier's Le Règne Animal, in 1831. In this work the lizard is illustrated with the title Lacerta nebulosa, the clouded lizard, and summarily and dismissively described under that name in the text as a smallish lizard. In an addendum to the 1831 volume titled Synopsis, John Edward Gray provides a Linnaean list of the species mentioned. Here Gray identifies the lizard as Iguana (Cyclura) nubila or "Clouded Guana" and includes a brief species description. Cyclura was seen as a subgenus by Gray at the time. In Cuvier's actual Le Règne Animal (from the second edition onwards) he describes an Iguana cychlura, but Griffith doesn't mention this at all in his 'translation', and Gray dismisses the taxon as unclear in his Synopsis. The word nubila is Latin for "cloudy". The origin of the single small specimen upon which the species was based was found in the natural history cabinet of the British Museum, was unknown-as the name nubila is based this specimen, it is thus the holotype for this taxon.

The French herpetologists Auguste Duméril and Gabriel Bibron state in 1837 that where some authors might believe that there were nine or ten species of Cyclura, as far as they could tell there were only three (of which two are now classified in Ctenosaura). They classify all the Cyclura of the Turks and Caicos Islands (C. carinata was believed to occur in the Carolinas at the time), the Bahamas, and Cuba as the species C. harlani. The two species from Hispaniola, rhinoceros iguanas and C. ricordii, were each afforded their own genus. They state Gray's C. nubila is not clearly distinct from Richard Harlan's C. carinata, of which the specimen they could not examine, but that it is clearly a juvenile considering its size -rejecting both names in favour of their own. The taxon name C. harlani had first been introduced by Jean-Théodore Cocteau in Ramón de la Sagra's exhaustive description of Cuba, Histoire physique, politique et naturelle de l'ile de Cuba, apparently as a nomen nudum, but was fully described by Duméril and Bibron in this work.

In 1845 Gray had fully adopted the genus Cyclura and described a second and third species in the genus besides C. nubila, C. macleayii, from a specimen collected in Cuba in the intervening years, and C. collei from Jamaica. He furthermore considered C. carinata and C. harlani to be synonyms of his own C. nubila in this 1845 work, despite C. carinata being the first Cyclura described in 1825 when Harlan first circumscribed the genus Cyclura, and thus having priority over C. nubila.

George Albert Boulenger, working with the same British Museum collection of specimens four decades later, in 1885, instead interpreted C. carinata as monotypic, the only species to inhabit the Bahamas, Cuba and the Turks and Caicos, considering all the other previously named taxa synonyms.

Herpetologists and taxonomists Thomas Barbour and Gladwyn Kingsley Noble first described the Lesser Caymans iguana as a species in 1916, C. caymanensis. In this work they renamed Cuban iguanas from C. nubila to the misspelled junior synonym C. macleayi, giving as the reason that because the holotype was somewhere in London and not in the US, they hadn't examined it, and furthermore found that Gray's scientific description was worthless. Additionally, the specimen had no collection data and was of a juvenile, and was thus inferior. Chapman Grant, in an article published in 1940, subsumed C. caymanensis as a subspecies of Cyclura macleayi (sic). Grant also formally described the iguanas inhabiting the island of Grand Cayman as a separate taxon for the first time, classifying it as the trinomial C. macleayi lewisi, and basing this new taxon on two specimens procured from the island of Grand Cayman in 1938 by Charles Bernard Lewis. After almost 60 years, in 1975 Albert Schwartz and Richard Thomas renamed the species C. nubila again, using the trinomial nomenclature C. nubila caymanensis for the subspecies. Schwartz and Carey followed up this taxonomic paper with a more in depth study of the scalation patterns on the heads (such patterns are often unique to a particular species and can act as a "fingerprint" of sorts) of Caribbean iguanas, finding no difference between the Bahamian, Cuban and Cayman head scale patterns.

The closest relatives of Cyclura nubila are the Grand Cayman blue iguana (C. lewisi) and the Northern Bahamian rock iguana (C. cychlura), these three species diverged from a common ancestor. A 2000 phylogenetic analysis of the mitochondrial DNA by Malone et al. found that C. nubila nubila is most closely related to C. lewisi, with these two taxa forming a clade with C. cychlura, and with the subspecies C. nubila caymanensis being a sister taxon to these three taxa and the least related to the nominate C. nubila.

Following Grant, Schwartz and Thomas, Cyclura nubila was considered to have three subspecies, the Grand Cayman blue iguana (termed C. nubila lewisi), the Lesser Caymans iguana (C. nubila caymanensis), and the nominate Cuban subspecies (C. nubila nubila). Frederick Burton revised this classification in 2004 by recognising the Grand Cayman blue iguana as a separate species, reasoning that Malone's 2000 study meant that the blue iguana was just as closely related to the Cuban, as the Bahamas species was to the Cuban, and the skin colour was often blue. His own research into the scalation patterns on the heads (such patterns are often unique to a particular species and can act as a "fingerprint" of sorts) of the four taxa from the Bahamas, Cuba and Cayman Islands, found that although the Bahamas specimens were distinguishable by the presence of a single large canthal scale which had merged from three smaller ones, the three subspecies of C. nubila could not be diagnostically separated by head scales. Although C. nubila lewisi would not be considered a separate species according to traditional species concepts, Burton proposed using the "general lineage concept" introduced by de Queiroz in 1998 to do so anyway. This does render C. nubila polyphyletic, based on Malone et al.

Both Malone and Burton's research on C. nubila nubila was limited to iguanas from Guantánamo Bay, and in the case of Malone, a small sample size and limited loci. A 2000 study using more loci over a larger sample size from the entirety of Cuba found a high degree of genetic structure within the taxon, notably the populations in the east and west of Cuba show clear differences in their genes, likely reflecting the prehistorical geography - Cuba was two main islands a few million years ago when sea levels were over 30 metres higher than today. Cyclura lewisi resolves as a subpopulation of the western races of C. nubila nubila, whereas C. nubila caymanensis is one of the eastern races of C. nubila nubila. This study did find C. cychlura to be an outgroup.

During the Pliocene the Cayman Islands were submerged below the sea, but at the end of this era, two to three million years ago, increasing glaciation lowered the sea level and the islands were exposed. During the heights of the Ice Ages they would have been much larger and closer to Cuba, although the Lesser Islands and Grand Cayman were always separated by a deep channel. Thus, logically, both the Cayman species must have evolved from Cuban iguanas which floated or swam to their present home somewhere within this time frame.

== Description ==
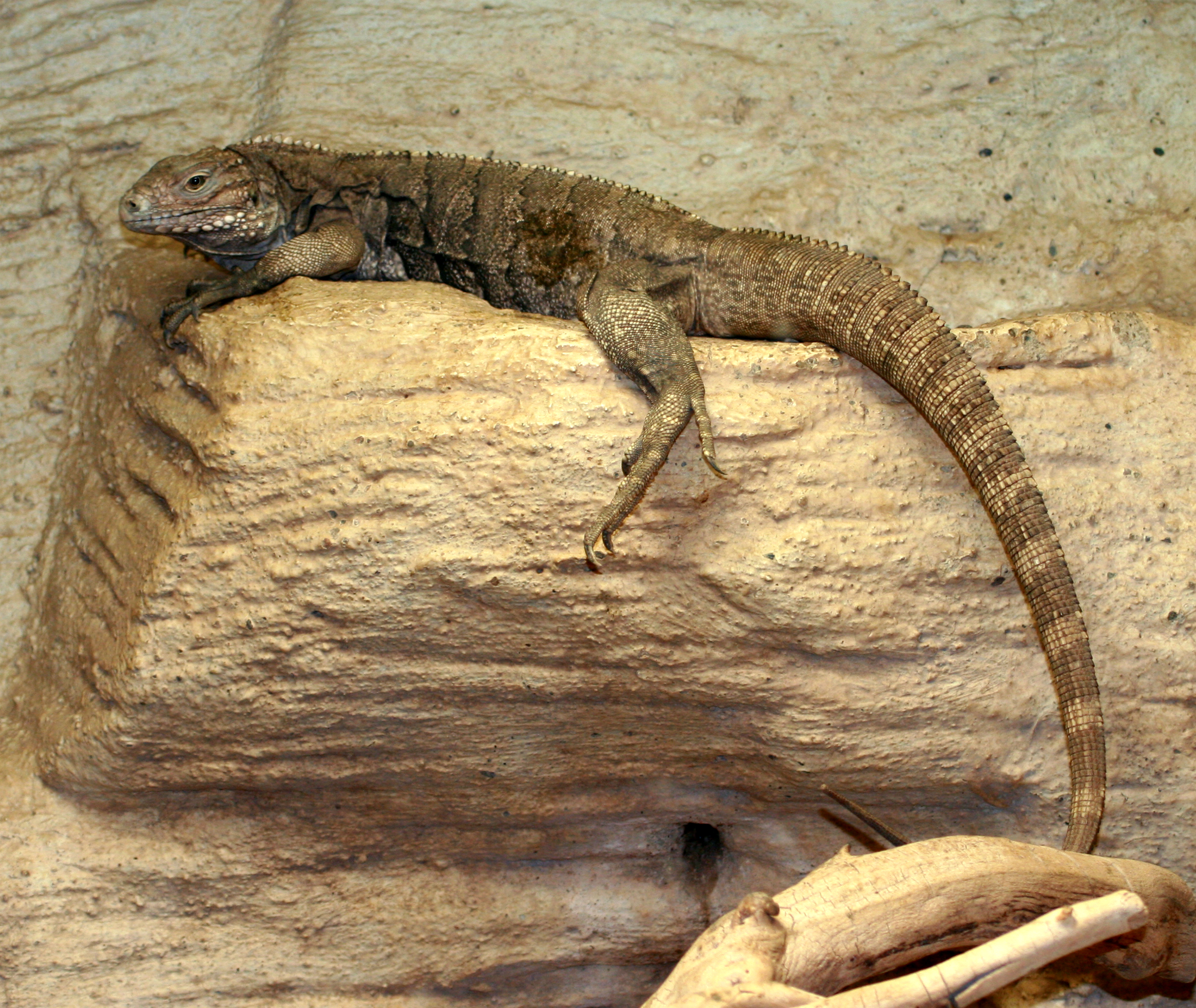
In Prague Zoo

The Cuban iguana is a large lizard, only surpassed in size by the blue iguana among the Cyclura; it has an average body length of 40 centimeters (16 in) from snout to vent (the base of the tail). On rare occasions, individual males with lengths of 1.6 meters (5.2 ft) when measured from the snout to the tip of the tail have been recorded at the wildlife sanctuary within the Guantanamo Bay Naval Base with females being two thirds that size. The species is sexually dimorphic: males are much larger than females, and males have enlarged femoral pores on their thighs, which are used to release pheromones to attract mates and mark territory. The skin of male Cuban iguanas ranges in color from dark gray to brick red, whereas that of females is olive green with dark stripes or bands. In both sexes, limbs are black with pale brown oval spots and solid black feet. Young animals tend to be dark brown or green with faint darker striping or mottling in five to ten diagonal transverse bands on the body. These bands blend in with the body color as the iguana ages. Both sexes possess a dewlap (skin hanging below the neck) and a row of spines running down their back to their thick tail. Their heads and necks are short and stout, their teeth are solid and broad, and they have powerful jaw muscles. Their jowls, which grow larger as the animal ages, are covered in spiky protuberances called tubercles.

== Ecology ==
Ant predation of iguana eggs occurs in the feral population of Puerto Rico.

=== Diet ===
Like all Cyclura species, the Cuban iguana is primarily herbivorous. It eats purslane, prickly pear (Opuntia sp.), black mangrove (Avicennia germinans), Harrisia cacti and grasses. Perhaps aiding in the digestion of this high-cellulose diet, colonies of nematodes occupy 50% of the contents of Cuban iguanas' large intestines. Cuban iguanas occasionally consume animal matter, and individuals have been observed scavenging the corpses of birds, fish and crabs. Researchers on Isla Magueyes observed a single episode of cannibalism in 2006 when an adult female iguana chased, caught, and ate a hatchling. The researchers wrote that the dense population on Isla Magueyes could have caused this incident.

=== Mating and behavior ===
Cuban iguanas reach sexual maturity at an age of two to three years. Males are gregarious when immature, but become more aggressive as they age, vigorously defending territories in competition for females. Females are more tolerant of each other, except after laying their eggs.

Mating occurs in May and June, and females lay single clutches of three to 30 eggs in June or July. According to field research, females deposit their eggs at the same nesting sites each year. The nests are built in the same localities, perhaps because like crocodilians, lack of suitable nesting sites is a limiting factor affecting reproduction in this species. On Cuba's Isla de la Juventud, Cuban iguanas nest in pockets of earth exposed to the sun by Cuban crocodiles, after the crocodiles' eggs have hatched. These nests are separate from where adult iguanas live. In areas without crocodiles, the iguanas excavate nests in sandy beaches. At the San Diego Zoo, a female built a nest at the end of a long chamber she excavated in the sand. She stood near it for weeks, defending it by shaking her head and hissing at anyone who approached; this behavior demonstrated that Cuban iguanas guard their nest sites. The hatchlings spend several days to two weeks in the nest chamber from the time they hatch to the time they emerge from the nests; dispersing individually after emergence.

Although Cuban iguanas typically remain still for long periods of time and have a slow lumbering gait due to their body mass, they are capable of quick bursts of speed for short distances. Younger animals are more arboreal and will seek refuge in trees, which they can climb with great agility. The animal is a capable swimmer and will take to nearby water if threatened. When cornered they can bite and lash their tails in defense.

== Distribution and habitat ==
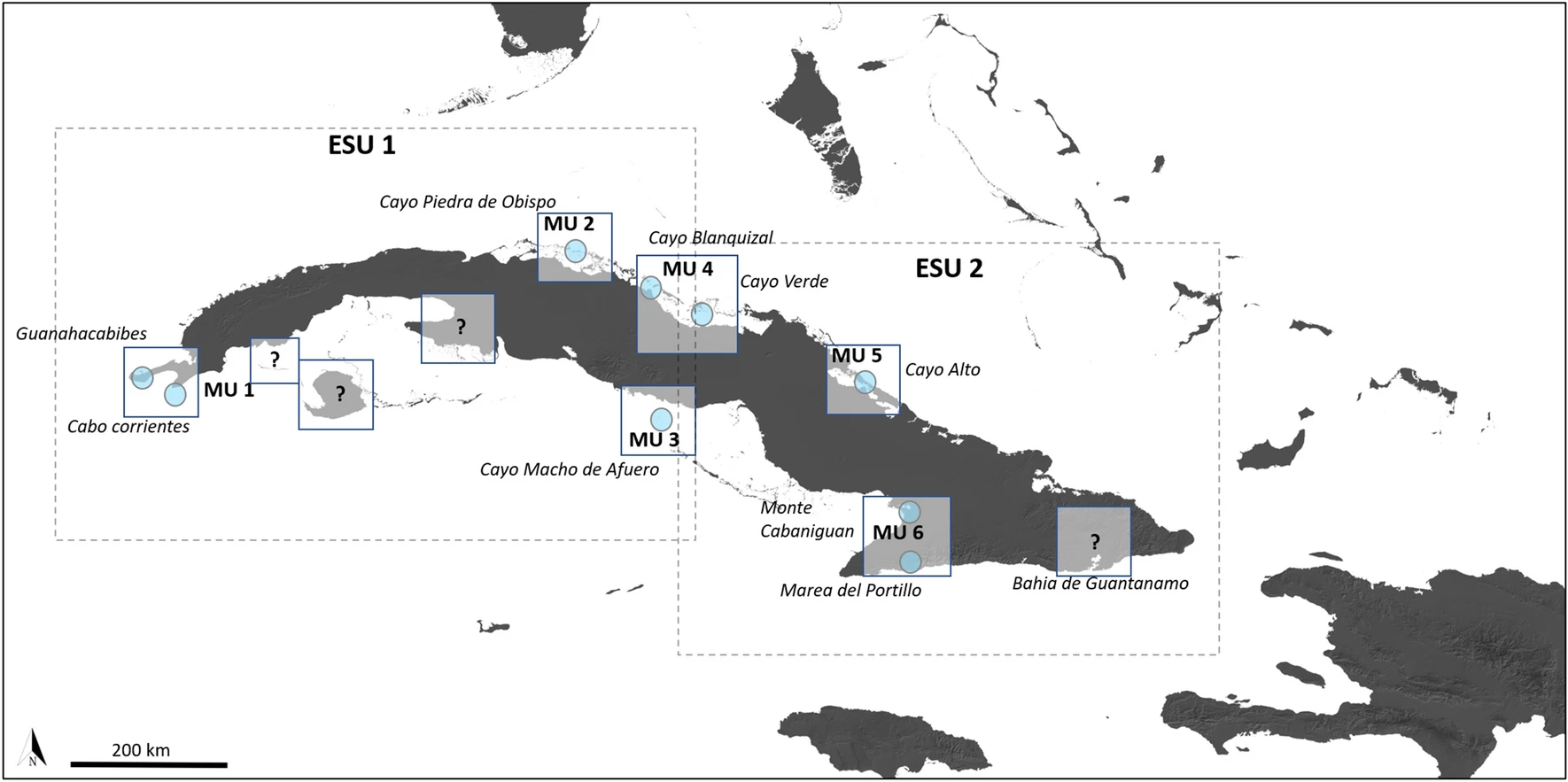
Map of C. nubila nubila populations on Cuba. All squares indicate populations.

The Cuban iguana is found in rocky coastal areas on Cuba and throughout as many as 4,000 islets surrounding the Cuban mainland, including Isla de la Juventud off the southern coast, which has one of the most robust populations. Populations are found on islets along the north and south coasts and in protected areas on the mainland. These include Guanahacabibes Biosphere Reserve in the west, Desembarco del Granma National Park, Hatibonico Wildlife Refuge, Punta Negra-Quemados Ecological Reserve, and Delta del Cauto Wildlife Refuge, all in eastern Cuba. The population on the US Naval Base at Guantánamo Bay has been estimated at 2,000 to 3,000 individuals, and the animals are treated well and protected by US forces stationed at the base. According to Allison Alberts, an ecologist at the San Diego Zoo, among the many wildlife species at the base, "the Cuban iguana is one of the largest, undoubtedly the most visible, and certainly the most charismatic. It seems that no one completes a tour of duty at GTMO without getting to know these prehistoric-looking giants". An unusual incident occurred when a detainee in the prison assaulted a guard with a bloody tail torn from a Cuban iguana in 2005.

The subspecies, C. n. caymanensis, is endemic to the "Sister Islands" of Little Cayman and Cayman Brac. The population on Cayman Brac is less than 50 of these animals and Little Cayman supports 1,500. A feral population of C. n. caymanensis has been established on Grand Cayman.

The Cuban iguana makes its burrow near cacti or thistles, sometimes even within the cactus itself. These thorny plants offer protection and their fruit and flowers offer the iguanas food. In areas without cacti, the lizards make their burrows in dead trees, hollow logs, and limestone crevices.

In the mid-1960s a small group of Cuban iguanas was released from a zoo on Isla Magueyes, southwest of Puerto Rico, forming an independent free-ranging feral population. As of 2000, there has been talk of removing or relocating this population of iguanas by the US Department of Interior. This feral population is the source for 90% of the captive Cuban iguanas held in private collections.

A 1998 study compared the head-bob displays from the source population on Cuba with these animals on Isla Magueyes. The durations and pauses were longer by as much as 350% in the feral population. In comparison, the blue iguana of Grand Cayman's head-bob displays differed from those of the animals on Cuba by only about 20%. The rapid change in display structure between the colony of animals on Isla Magueyes and those on Cuba illustrated the potential of small founding population size as a catalyst to evolution with regard to communication or display. In this case the difference was by only six generations at most.

== Conservation ==
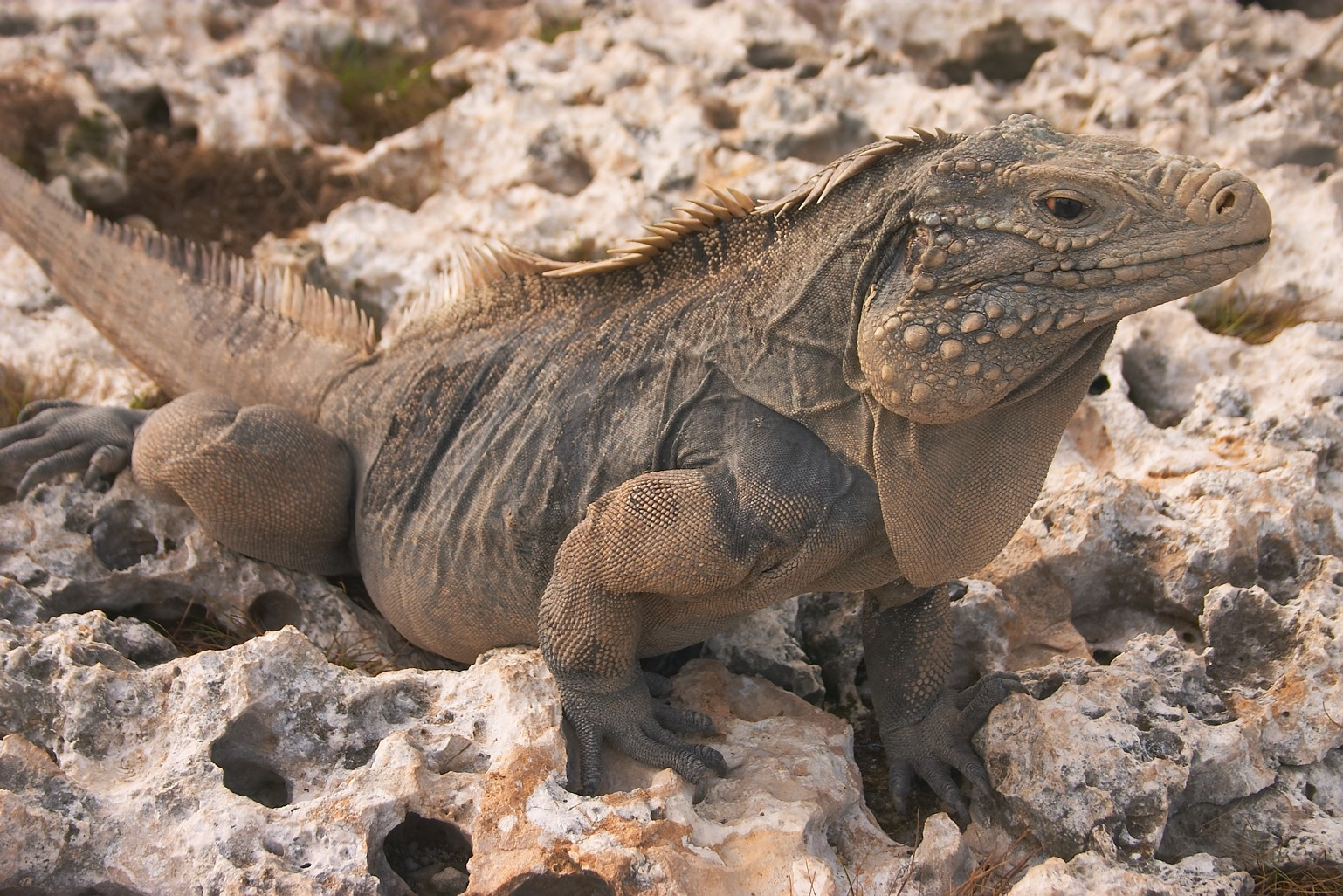
In the wild

As of 1999, all but one of the major iguana concentrations are either partially or fully protected by the Cuban government. Although no captive-breeding program exists within Cuba, the Centro Nacional de Areas Protegidas (the National Center for Protected Areas) has suggested it will explore this route in the future. In 1985 the Cuban government issued a commemorative peso depicting a Cuban iguana on the head side of the coin in an attempt to raise awareness for this animal.

The Cuban iguana is well-established in public and private collections. Many zoological parks and private individuals keep them in captive breeding programs, minimizing the demand for wild-caught specimens for the pet trade. Cuban iguanas are listed as "vulnerable" on the IUCN Red List, as is the predominant Cuban subspecies, while the Cayman Island subspecies is "critically endangered". The total population in Cuba is estimated at between 40,000 and 60,000 individuals, and the feral population on Isla Magueyes is estimated at over 1,000.

In a round-about way, the Cuban iguana's status under the US Endangered Species Act made its way into US jurisprudence. In the fall of 2003, attorney Tom Wilner needed to persuade the justices of the US Supreme Court to take the case of a dozen Kuwaiti detainees being held in isolation in Guantanamo Bay, Cuba, without charges, without a hearing and without access to a lawyer. According to Peter Honigsberg, a professor of law at the University of San Francisco, Wilner unsuccessfully made two arguments before the Court to hear his case; in his third argument he changed tactics by mentioning US law and the Cuban iguana. Wilner argued, "anyone, including a federal official, who violates the Endangered Species Act by harming an iguana at Guantanamo, can be fined and prosecuted. Yet the government argues that US law does not apply to protect the human prisoners there". According to Honigsberg, the Supreme Court agreed to hear the case because of this argument.

As opposed to other West Indian islands where iguanids are found, consumption of iguana meat was never widespread in Cuba. Certain fishing communities may have once practiced it, but for the most part the animal was not eaten by Cubans. According to naturalist Thomas Barbour in 1946, this was based on superstitious beliefs which suggest that the iguanas emit a dark fluid reminiscent of the black vomit of yellow fever victims when they are killed.

A main threat to iguanas throughout the Caribbean are cats. On Guantanamo they consume untold numbers of baby iguanas each year.

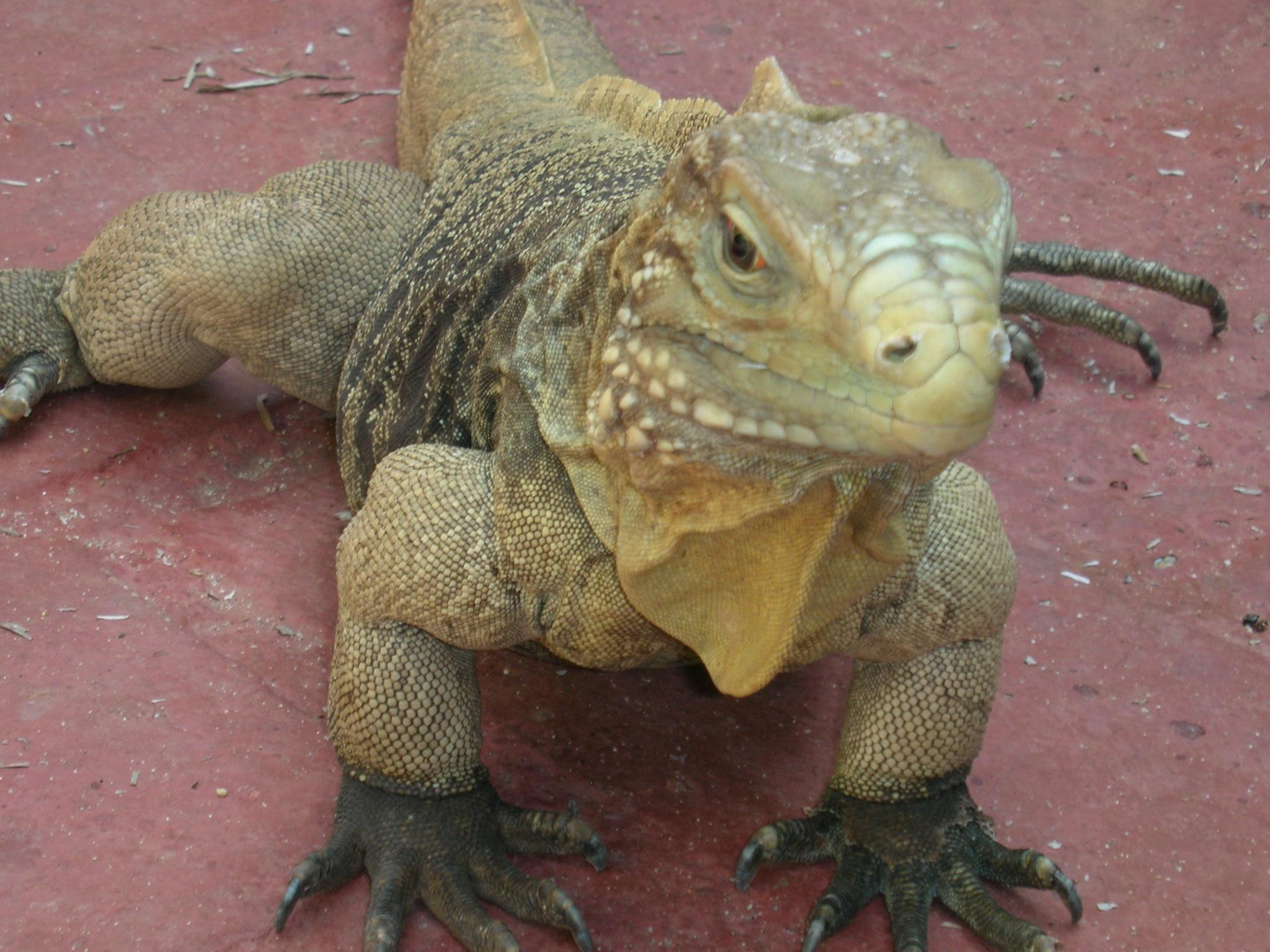
Cyclura nubila at a tourist resort in south-east Cuba.

In 1993 the San Diego Zoo experimentally tested the utility of a "head-starting" program for newly hatched Cuban iguanas with funding from the National Science Foundation's Conservation and Restoration Biology Program. "Head-starting" is a process by which the iguana's eggs are hatched in an incubator and the animals are protected and fed for the first 20 months of their lives. The purpose is to get the animals to a size where they are more capable of fleeing from or fighting off predators. This technique was originally used to protect hatchling sea turtles, Galapagos land iguanas, and Ctenosaura bakeri on the island of Útila, but Alberts used it for the first time on a Cyclura species with the Cuban iguana. The purpose was not only to help the Cuban iguana population, but to test the overall effectiveness of headstarting as a conservation strategy for more critically endangered species of Cyclura.

The strategy proved successful, according to Alberts, when the released head-started iguanas reacted to predators, foraged for food, and behaved like their wild-born counterparts. This strategy has been implemented with great success with other endangered species of Cyclura and Ctenosaura throughout the West Indies and Central America, notably the Jamaican iguana, Grand Cayman blue iguana, Ricord's iguana, Allen Cays iguana, Acklins ground iguana, and Anegada iguana.
