= Allison Alberts =

American biologist

Allison C. Alberts
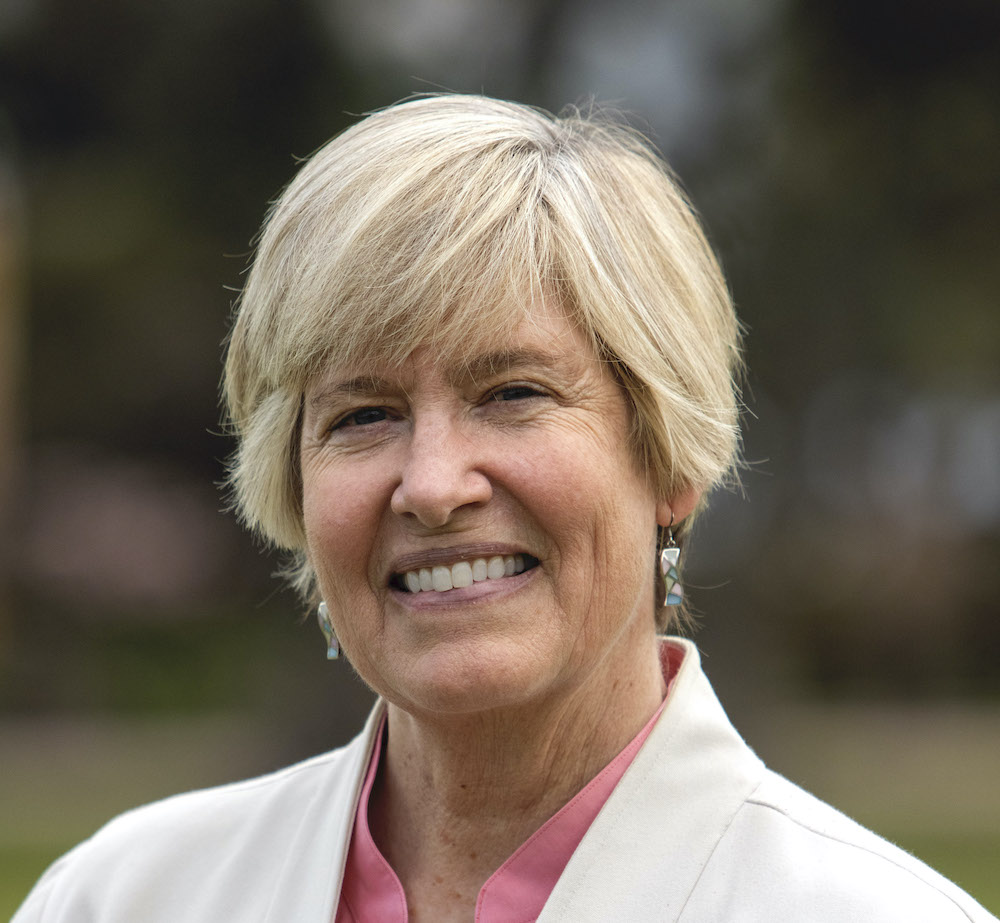
- Alberts in 2019
- Born: October 13, 1960 (age 65); San Francisco, California, United States
- Education: University of California at Berkeley, B.A., University of California at San Diego, Ph.D.
- Known for: Herpetology, Conservation Biology

Allison Christine Alberts (born October 13, 1960) is an American herpetologist and conservation biologist. She began her career at the San Diego Zoo Wildlife Alliance in 1990 as a postdoctoral fellow, eventually serving as the zoo's Chief Conservation Officer and Benirschke Chair of Research from 2005 to 2020, the first woman in that role. She is known for her work with rock iguanas, Komodo dragons, sea turtles, desert tortoises, and native California lizards and snakes, and she is the author of more than 100 scientific and popular articles and three books.

== Education ==
Alberts received her B.A. in biology from the University of California at Berkeley in 1982 and her Ph.D. from the University of California at San Diego in 1989. Her dissertation focused on chemical communication in the desert iguana, including the first demonstration of visual sensitivity to ultraviolet light in a reptile species.

== Career ==
Alberts began her career at the San Diego Zoo in 1990, working primarily with the highly endangered rock iguanas of the Caribbean. She led a team that conducted a decade of research on the U.S. Naval Base at Guantanamo Bay, Cuba, using the Cuban iguana as a model species. The work focused on headstarting, temporary alteration of social structure to enhance genetic diversity, and educational outreach to base residents.

In 2005, Alberts was named Chief Conservation Officer and Benirschke Chair of Research for San Diego Zoo Global (now San Diego Zoo Wildlife Alliance). During her tenure, the research staff grew to 200 science professionals working in 38 countries. Major initiatives included global species recovery programs, genetic banking, community-based conservation, and addressing wildlife trafficking and climate change. Since retiring from the Zoo in 2020, Alberts has served as Senior Advisor for the strategic planning firm Ecoleaders.

== Service ==
Alberts is co-founder and past co-chair of the IUCN – World Conservation Union Species Survival Commission Iguana Specialist Group. In 2015, she received the Athena Pinnacle Award for Excellence in recognition, promotion, and mentorship of women in the Life Sciences. Since 2018, Alberts has served on the advisory board of the Mohamed bin Zayed Species Conservation Fund. Her board service also includes the International Iguana Foundation, San Diego Natural History Museum, Center for Plant Conservation, and Turtle Survival Alliance.

== Selected publications ==
- Alberts, A.C. (1989). Ultraviolet visual sensitivity in desert iguanas: Implications for pheromone detection. Animal Behaviour 38, 129–137.
- Alberts, A.C. (1992). Constraints on the design of chemical communication systems in terrestrial vertebrates. American Naturalist 139S, 62–59.
- Phillips, J.A., Alberts, A.C. (1992) Naive ophiophagus lizards recognize and avoid venomous snakes using chemical cues. J Chem Ecol 18, 1775–1783.
- Alberts, A.C. (2000). West Indian Iguanas: Status Survey and Conservation Action Plan. IUCN – The World Conservation Union, Gland Switzerland.
- Alberts, A.C., R.L. Carter, W.K. Hayes, and E.P. Martins. (2004). Iguanas: Biology and Conservation. University of California Press, Berkeley, California.
- Lemm, J.M. and A.C. Alberts. (2012). Cyclura: Natural History, Husbandry, and Conservation of the West Indian Rock Iguanas. Academic Press, Elsevier, San Diego, California.
