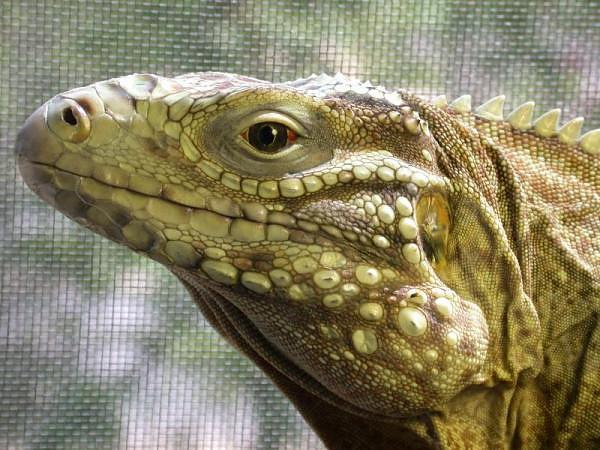

Conservation status
- Critically Endangered (IUCN 3.1)

Scientific classification
- Kingdom: Animalia
- Phylum: Chordata
- Class: Reptilia
- Order: Squamata
- Suborder: Iguania
- Family: Iguanidae
- Genus: Cyclura
- Species: C. nubila
- Subspecies: C. n. caymanensis

Trinomial name
- Cyclura nubila caymanensis (Barbour & Noble, 1916)

Synonyms
- Cyclura caymanensis Barbour & G.K. Noble, 1916; Cyclura macleayi caymanensis (Barbour & G.K. Noble, 1916)

= Cyclura nubila caymanensis =

Subspecies of lizard

Cyclura nubila caymanensis, the Lesser Caymans iguana, Cayman Brac iguana, Cayman Island brown iguana or Sister Isles iguana, is a critically endangered subspecies of the Cuban iguana (Cyclura nubila). It is native to two islands to the south of Cuba: Cayman Brac and Little Cayman, which are also known as the Sister Isles due to their similar shapes and close proximity to each other. The population of this subspecies has been impacted by habitat encroachment by human development and is likely being destroyed due to predation by cats (Felis catus), the population on Cayman Brac has remained particularly small for decades.

== Taxonomy ==
The Lesser Caymans iguana, Cyclura nubila caymanensis, is only found on the islands of Little Cayman and Cayman Brac. It is a subspecies of Cuban iguana. This subspecies has been introduced to Grand Cayman, where it has interbred with that island's endemic blue iguana (C. lewisi).

Its specific name, nubila, is Latin for 'cloudy', 'overcast' or 'gloomy', and was chosen in 1831 by the British zoologist John Edward Gray. Its subspecific name caymanensis refers to the islands where it lives, the suffix -ensis meaning 'of' or 'pertaining to'.

Using a single specimen from Cayman Brac collected in 1911, Herpetologists and taxonomists Thomas Barbour and Gladwyn Kingsley Noble first described the Lesser Caymans iguana as a species in 1916. Chapman Grant, in an article published in 1940, subsumed the taxon as a subspecies of Cyclura macleayi.

In 1975 Albert Schwartz and Richard Thomas renamed the species C. nubila again, using the trinomial nomenclature C. nubila caymanensis for this taxon. It evolved from and will readily interbreed with the nominate subspecies, as well as with Cyclura nubila lewisi, with which it has viable, fully fertile offspring.

== Description ==
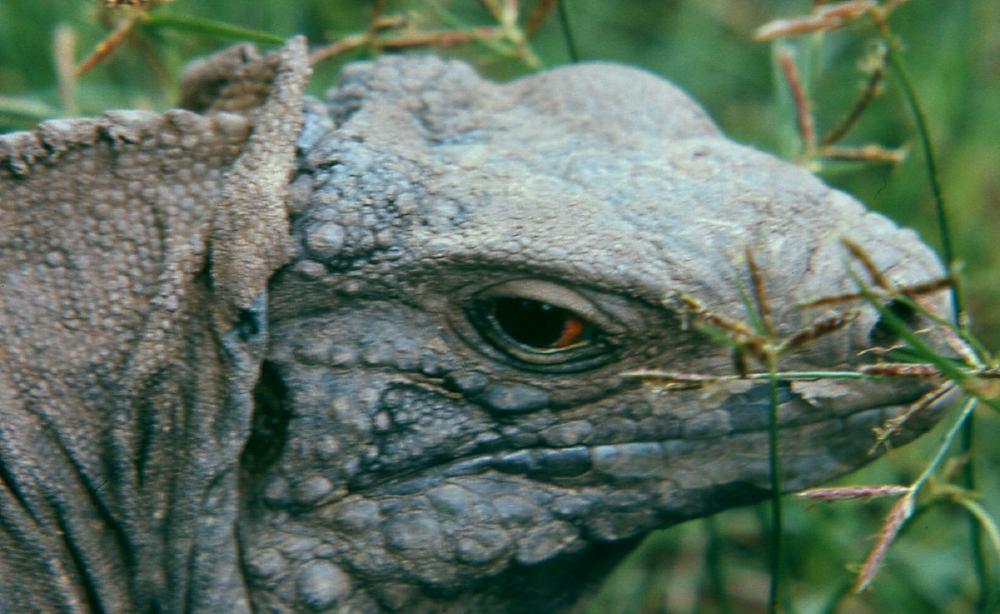
Cyclura nubila caymanensis, captive specimen in Hope Gardens, Jamaica

Cyclura nubila caymanensis is a medium to large lizard with an average total length between 30 and 40 inches. Like other Cyclura, it is sexually dimorphic; males are larger than females. The males also have more prominent dorsal crests and larger femoral pores on their thighs, which are used to release pheromones.

The skin color of males ranges between light grey to green when mature, with often a light blue or reddish-pink colored head, and diagonal black bars partially ringing the body and tail which fade with age, whereas females are more drab, lacking any red or blue, but sometimes with a greenish wash. Young animals are light brown, with five to ten paler chevron-shaped bands bordered in black -the bands break up in spots at their sides. Adults of both sexes have black forefeet. An individual of this subspecies was recorded to have lived 33 years.

== Distribution and habitat ==
Cayman Islands

Native to the islands of Little Cayman and Cayman Brac, this subspecies has been introduced to Grand Cayman.

Like other members of the genus Cyclura the Lesser Caymans iguana requires suitable areas in which to bask, forage, nest and hide.

Pit-tagging and radio-tracking the iguanas has revealed much information about the subspecies. A surprising find in 2016 based upon this research was the habitat preference of the lizards. It was previously thought that they were concentrated in the undisturbed dry scrubland of the interior, but based on where they spent most of their time on average, they are more commonly to be found in disturbed, anthropogenic habitat such as gardens and roadsides.

== Ecology ==
Like all Cyclura species the Lesser Caymans iguana is primarily herbivorous, consuming leaves, flowers and fruits.

Mating occurs in April to May, as the dry season ends, and 7–25 eggs are usually laid in May or June. Due to being forced to dwell inland where the soil is rocky, the females often have to migrate to coastal areas in order to build their nests in the sand. The female iguanas will congregate in higher densities in the nesting areas to lay their eggs, but disperse afterwards. The hatchlings emerge from the nests in early August to early September.

== Conservation ==
=== Population and status ===
The Lesser Caymans iguana is critically endangered according to the 2012 IUCN Red List of endangered species assessment, based on the authors' assertion that there were only 840-900 individuals across both islands and the population was decreasing rapidly. It was previously given the status of vulnerable in 1996 according to the criteria of the time, as a member of Cyclura nubila.

A population survey on Cayman Brac in 2012 counted and pit-tagged 86 individuals. One of these was killed by a vehicle in April 2012. There were additional individuals which were spotted but not captured and pit-tagged.

Matt Goetz was able to find 120 nests on West Point beach on Little Cayman in 2010. The International Iguana Foundation searched the same area in 2015 and 2016, and found 78 and 62 nests respectively. Iguanas were pit-tagged on the island by the foundation in 2015 and 2016, over 900 iguanas were pit-tagged in total. The Terrestrial Research Unit of the Cayman Islands Department of Environment has conducted three surveys of the population on Little Cayman since 2014, in 2015 the population was calculated as 2,915 iguanas and in 2019 the survey showed a steep drop to 1,786 iguanas, thought to be due to cats. It was pointed out in 2016 that the use of roads as basking areas by the iguanas may cause an overestimation of population size, as such surveys were generally conducted along roads.

=== Threats ===
It was the opinion sometime in the mid-1990s of Gerber, a US scientist who visited Little Cayman in 1993, that habitat destruction was the main factor threatening the future of this iguana, because a municipal power generating station has recently been built and the airstrip was to be modernised, and he claimed thus rampant uncontrolled development would soon occur in the uninhabited dry scrub where he believed, at the time, the iguanas bred. According to Gerber, besides economic development of the islands, other threats to the iguanas were traditional agriculture on Cayman Brac, predation by feral cats and domestic dogs, disturbance of nesting areas and road casualties. Especially the proliferating cats posed an immediate threat to population recruitment. He also hypothesized that it was possible that rats may be preying on the eggs and injuring hatchlings.

The iguanas nest in the sand of beaches, and nesting sites have been protected by the government according to the national conservation plan since 1990. As of 2016 the interior habitat on Little Cayman remains "relatively undisturbed". As of 2020 (further) habitat loss has not been an important factor affecting population. Research indicates that the main factor influencing mortality are cats. Cats are killing the juveniles in large amounts, which may be showing in the demographic breakdown of the iguana population (in the 2014 and 2015 surveys hatchlings were 19.4% of the registered sightings, but in the 2019 survey these were only 6%), affecting recruitment of adults. Feral proliferating cats are a problem, as are pet owners without responsible husbandry habits.

Although Gerber recommended eradicating or controlling them, and the Cayman Islands National Trust had mentioned that the cat population "threatens to be the death knell for the iguana population on Cayman Brac: feral cats are now found in huge numbers, and they eagerly pursue juvenile iguanas" and to protect the iguanas "… a concerted effort to reduce the thousands of feral cats, many living in hunger and misery in the woodlands, must first be undertaken" in 1996, only in 2018 did the Cayman Islands government attempt to cull the animals, a joint program by the Department of Agriculture and the Department of Environment. Just before they could begin, two animal welfare organisations, Cayman Islands Humane Society and Feline Friends, filed a temporary injunction, in order to apply for a judicial review of the impending program. Although these organisations were "acutely aware" of the damage caused by cats on the endangered wildlife, they argued cat welfare should trump such biodiversity loss and proposed a policy of neutering the "homeless" animals, vaccinating the cats against possible diseases, and releasing them back into the wild. The government responded that such a program was incompatible with conservation aims. The organisations also argued that as official members of the Animal Welfare Advisory Council, they expected to have been consulted of the plan. A week later, a lawyer for the two organisations argued that neither government department had the authority to authorise a culling - the Animals Law stated that the Department of Agriculture could authorise an exemption to the prohibition against animal cruelty to use "any prescribed poison" to destroy a pest animal, nowhere did the law specify any poisons which were explicitly defined as "prescribed", and killing pests by the government was thus not possible under Cayman law. This also had some potential implications for the culling program already implemented for the invasive green iguanas. As of 2020 these ongoing legal complications have rendered the government unable to cull the invasive ferals.

To the tune of CI$600,000, the Cayman Islands Humane Society runs the only animal shelter on the islands. Some 450 abandoned cats and dogs go through the adoption program a year, most to people on the islands, the excess, a third, is sent to the USA. Some feral cats are also captured and neutered.

These iguanas find black-topped asphalt road convenient surfaces to use for basking, which leads to some mortality from automobiles. The total yearly roadkill count for 2019 was 44, in 2020 up to November the count was 24.

In 2016 the first evidence was presented that the green iguana, Iguana iguana, an invasive species which has achieved a giant population on Grand Cayman and Cayman Brac, was able to hybridise with the Lesser Caymans iguana. Three hybrid hatchlings were found on Little Cayman Island, these are the first unambiguous hybrids between I. iguana and any Cyclura iguana known to have occurred in the wild.

=== Captive breeding ===
As early as 1992 the Lesser Caymans iguana was established in captivity, both in public and private collections. Private individuals have established these animals in captive breeding programs (both purebred and occasionally mixed with either the blue iguana, Cuban iguana, and sometimes with both) minimizing the demand for wild-caught specimens for the pet trade.

A formal captive breeding program did not exist for this subspecies in 2005, but at the time one writer thought it might be warranted for the Cayman Brac population. As the population on Cayman Brac has not been found to be genetically distinct from the Little Cayman population; the writer noted that genetic diversity may be introduced from the Little Cayman population if it is needed.
