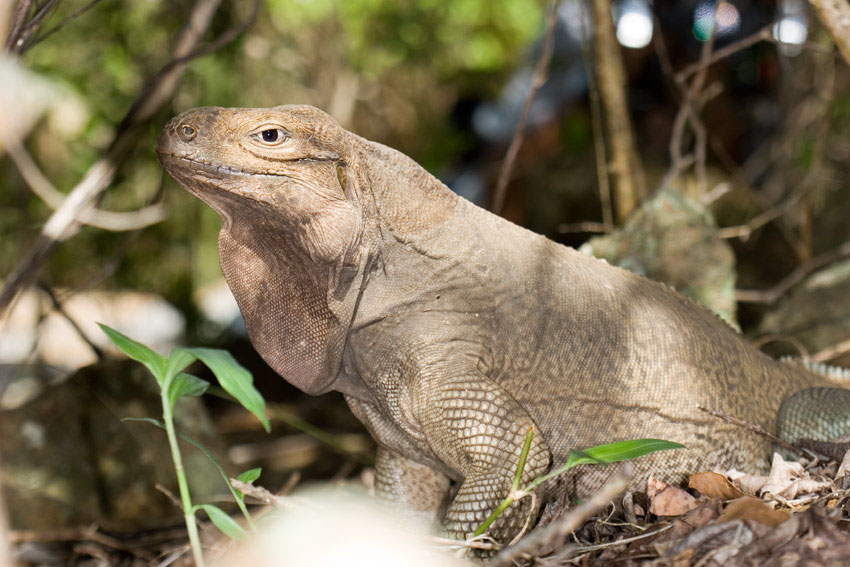
- In the wild on Anegada

Conservation status
- Critically Endangered (IUCN 3.1)
- CITES Appendix I (Note: Except populations of Australia, Indonesia, Malaysia and Papua New Guinea which are included in Appendix II.)

Scientific classification
- Kingdom: Animalia
- Phylum: Chordata
- Class: Reptilia
- Order: Squamata
- Suborder: Iguania
- Family: Iguanidae
- Genus: Cyclura
- Species: C. pinguis

Binomial name
- Cyclura pinguis Barbour, 1917

= Cyclura pinguis =

Species of reptile

Cyclura pinguis, the Anegada rock iguana, Anegada ground iguana or stout iguana, is a critically endangered species of lizard of the genus Cyclura belonging to the family Iguanidae. The species can be found exclusively in the islands of Anegada and Guana. Historically, it inhabited the islands of Puerto Rico and Saint Thomas; however, the animal's original range has been greatly diminished over prehistory.

== Natural history ==
The Anegada ground iguana is noted as the oldest species of Cyclura and the most genetically divergent of the West Indies' rock iguanas. An ancestor to this iguana first dispersed to Hispaniola, then onwards to the north and western islands, which has since diversified on different islands into the 9 species and several additional subspecies of the genus Cyclura as we know it today.

== Taxonomy ==
The Anegada ground iguana was first described by American Herpetologist Thomas Barbour 1917. Its specific name pinguis means "fat" and refers to the animal's stocky appearance and the common name "Stout iguana".

== Anatomy and morphology ==
The Anegada ground iguana is a large heavy-bodied rock iguana which attains a total body length of close to 22 in (560 mm). As juveniles they are faintly or boldly patterned with wide gray to moss green bands interspersed with wide gray to black anteriorly directed chevrons. These bands fade and are generally lost as the animals mature, turning a uniform grayish or brownish-black with varying amounts of turquoise on the dorsal spines, tail base, fore and hind legs. Occasionally this bluish coloration extends up onto the sides of the individual, particularly in males. Females tend to be relatively dull in color, exhibiting less brilliant blue if any.

This species, like other species of Cyclura, is sexually dimorphic; males are larger than females, and have more prominent dorsal crests, "horns" and femoral pores on their thighs, which are used to release pheromones.

== Diet ==
Like all Cyclura species the Anegada ground iguana is primarily herbivorous, consuming leaves, flowers and fruits from different plant species. However, due to direct competition with grazing livestock in its native habitat such as sheep, goats, burros, and cattle they have been reduced to eating vegetation rejected by these domestic and feral animals. This has also caused them to become opportunistic carnivores preying upon centipedes, millipedes, roaches, insects, and other invertebrates as opposed to being strict herbivores.

== Mating and habitat ==
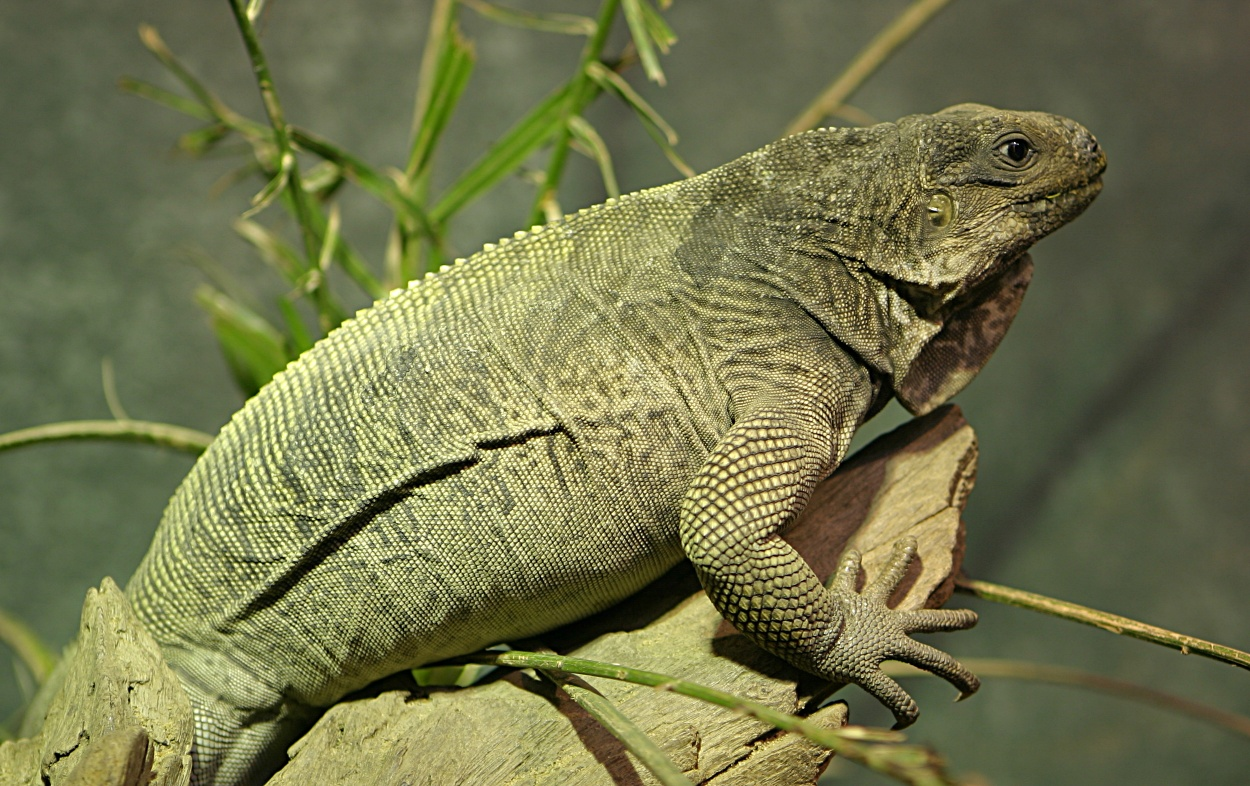
At the Houston Zoo

This forced diet has affected the iguanas' ability to reproduce. As reproductive females are not being provided with enough nutrition to produce eggs and support their own metabolism; many do not survive after laying eggs, resulting in the present skewed sex ratio of 2 males to every female. Females usually lay one clutch of about 12–16 eggs per year in late spring or early summer.

Anegada Island is rare in that it is not a volcanic island, but formed from coral and limestone providing many caves and natural burrows for the iguanas to live. Animals typically inhabit a single burrow and it was once observed that they appeared to bond for life, dwelling in burrows in close proximity to their mate. As the drive to find more females and compete for food has increased their range, this does not appear to be occurring any longer.

== Conservation ==
=== Endangered status ===
It is estimated that the current global population is less than 300 and is rapidly declining: the population has decreased by at least 80% over the last 40 years.

=== Causes of decline ===
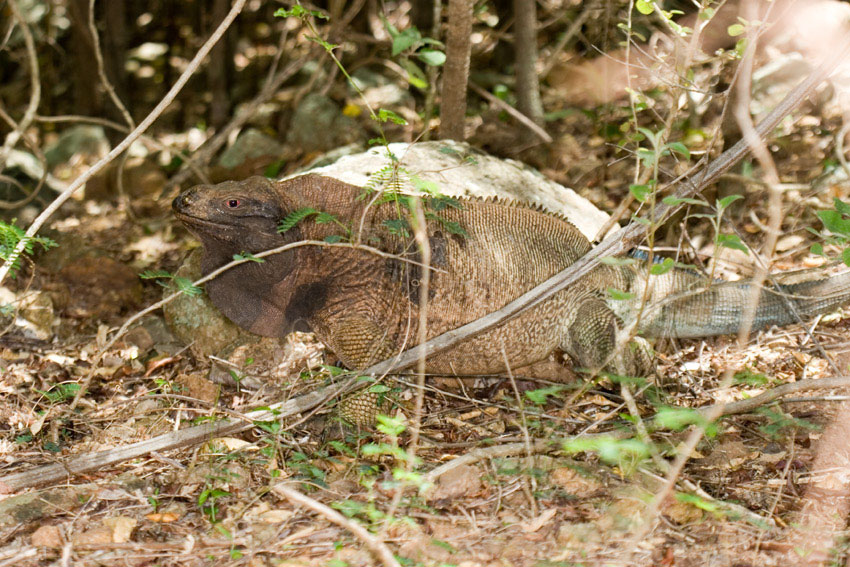
In the brush

The primary reason for the Anegeda ground iguana's decline is competitive grazing with domestic and feral livestock. The secondary reason is that they are preyed upon by feral dogs and cats. As with other Rock Iguanas, their habitat is also in rapid decline due to development and logging.

Live Anegada iguanas used to regularly be sold to tourists as pets, as their rarity made them more appealing to exotic animal collectors, despite this being illegal under the CITES treaty. In 1999 a World Wildlife Fund international conservation officer, Stuart Chapman, said: "The British government has turned a blind eye for over 20 years to these overseas territories which are home to many rare and endangered species. Many of these face extinction if Britain fails to honour its treaty obligations. The British Caribbean islands are extremely rich in biodiversity with many critically endangered species that are unique to the islands - yet there is virtually zero enforcement or implementation of CITES."

=== Recovery efforts ===
Intense conservation efforts are underway to protect this species. In the 1980s, eight iguanas were moved from Anegada to Guana Island, British Virgin Islands, to start a second population in part of the species' former range. Guana Island is not a limestone island, and does not provide as many natural retreats as Anegada does. The iguanas appear to be doing well and reproducing in areas free of feral sheep, which is its only competitor for vegetation. Approximately 20 adult iguanas are estimated to inhabit Guana and offspring have been seen each year since 1987. Guana Island Wildlife Sanctuary continues to try to rid the island of sheep, which may improve the habitat for iguanas.

The Anegada ground iguana has also been successfully bred in captivity at the San Diego Zoo and the Fort Worth Zoo. Both zoos have actively been working with the British Virgin Islands on a joint-recovery program started in 1997 on Anegeda Island. 120 iguanas have been raised at the facility for release into the wild. Hatchlings are fed and protected so they can be "headstarted" for the wild and not fall prey to feral dogs and cats. This offsets the juvenile mortality rate and is accompanied by field research, nest site protection, and monitoring of released animals.
