= Isla Magueyes =

Island with marine research in Puerto Rico

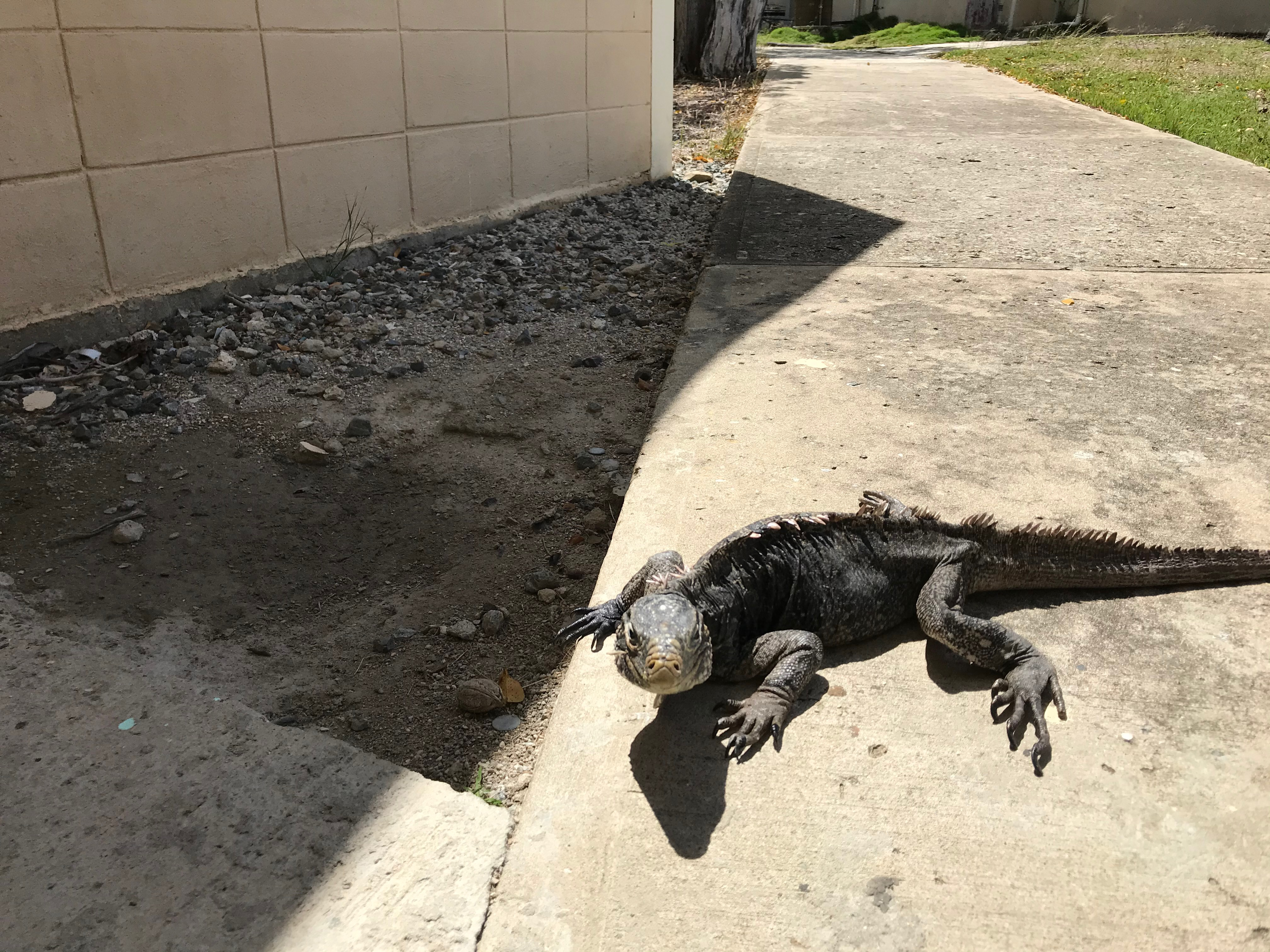
- Iguana at the marine lab on Isla Magueyes

- Location within Puerto Rico Location within Lesser Antilles Location within the Caribbean

Geography
- Location: Caribbean
- Coordinates: 17°58′08″N 67°02′39″W
- Archipelago: Greater Antilles
- Area: 0.072 km^{2} (0.028 sq mi)

Administration
- Puerto Rico

Additional information
- Time zone: AST (UTC-4)

Isla Magueyes (Isle of Maguey) is a 7.2 hectares (0.028 sq mi; 0.072 km^{2}) island 50 metres (160 ft) from the southwest coast of the island of Puerto Rico. It is encircled with mangrove and has an interior of dry scrub habitat, where it gets its name from. It is named for the presence of many century plants or maguey (Agave americana). The surrounding shelf of the island is mostly coral reef. There are buildings on the western end of the island associated with the Department of Marine Sciences, University of Puerto Rico at Mayagüez. UPR- Mayagüez is an important center in the Atlantic region for the study of tropical marine science due to its location, facilities, and researchers. The research facilities includes the Caribbean Coral Reef Institute (CCRI), ISER Caribe CIROM station and collaborations with Sea Grant Puerto Rico. Additionally, it includes the Caribbean Coastal Ocean Observing System (CARICOOS) that functions as the regional association responsible for coastal and ocean monitoring in Puerto Rico and the U.S. Virgin Islands.

== Fauna ==
A free-ranging colony of feral Cuban iguanas, released from a zoo that was closed on the island in the 1950s inhabit all parts of the island. While the iguanas are endangered in their native Cuba and are currently protected by the US Endangered Species Act, there has been talk of eliminating or reducing the population here as they are considered an invasive species. Currently dogs, cats, and most tourists are barred from the island to protect the iguanas. This has turned the island into somewhat of an unofficial bird sanctuary and brown pelicans, cattle egrets, and herons are commonly observed here. The biodiversity of Isla Magueyes also takes into account the animals that inhabit the surrounding waters in the island, with diverse ecosystems like mangroves and seagrass. Research on the island has revealed information about sex change on fish such as the Bicolor Damselfish and the Nassau Grouper. As well as bringing to light the description of a new species of peppermint shrimp Lysmata jundalini.

The iguana colony has been used as a research control group for various experiments concerning animal communication and evolution.

== History ==
Isla Magueyes presents historical and cultural value due to the presence of ancient Indian artifacts, that when dated indicate the work of the Igneri Neo-Indian tribes. The Artifacts found include a variety of shells and shell fragments, among these species of snails, bivalves and chitons. Some of the objects found (all made from shells from forementioned species) include tools, household articles, ornaments, idols and shell disks.

The Isla Magueyes Marine Laboratories were founded by Dr. Juan A. Rivero in 1954 as part of the Institute of Marine Biology in the Biology Department of the College of Agricultural and Mechanical Arts (CAAM), now known as the University of Puerto Rico at Mayaguez. The Puerto Rico Zoological garden was established in 1954 between Dr. Juan A Rivero and the University of Puerto Rico Mayaguez in, in La Parguera, Lajas; specifically in Isla Magueyes. This zoo held the first collection of live exotic animals for education and recreation in the island. The zoo was then transferred to Mayaguez and reopened in 1984. The island was also used as a captivity and rehabilitation center for marine mammals between 1950s and 1995, most of these mammals were brought to the island's laboratories already sick of injured. Animals captive in the island included bottlenose, Atlantic spotted ad Risso's dolphins, one baby sperm whale, West Indian manatees and California sea lions (which formed part of the Magueyes zoo).

The Isla Magueyes Marine labs are a part of the Association of Marine Laboratories of the Caribbean (AMLC), hosted the first meeting in 1957 founded by Dr. Juan A. Rivero.

== Research and management ==
This island forms part of La Parguera Nature Reserve, making it a protected area. La Parguera's ecosystem extends to a large range of habitats with great diversity and ecological value. Some of the habitats that are found and studied include: mangroves, seagrass beds, macroalgal beds, extensive coral reefs, emergent keys and bioluminescent bays. Research conducted in Isla Magueyes Marine Laboratories has been responsible for documenting data on things like boat propeller scarring on seagrass beds and how it affects abundance, long term comparisons on Diadema antillarum population decrease in La Parguera and possible factors that have affected this. It also documents ocean warming, acidification and net ecosystem metabolic processes. Organizations like ISER caribe have different research projects that focus on various aspects of coral ecosystem recovery and restoration. Rearing sea urchins, corals and herbivorous crabs in their facilities.

ISER caribe also offers nursery tours to the general public, montessori internships to local schools and Fiscal sponsorship groups as a part of their community outreach and support program.
