= Guana Island =

Private island in the British Virgin Islands

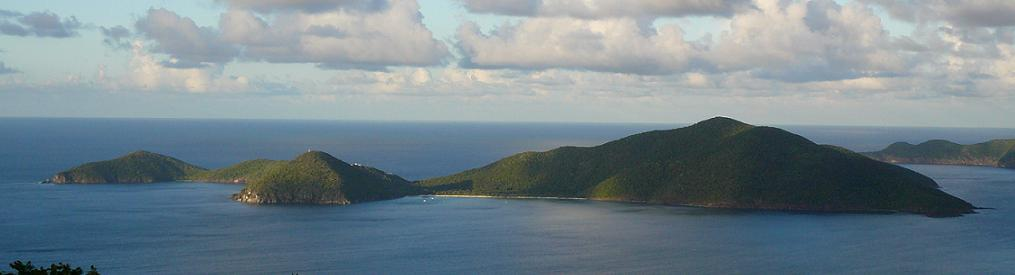
- Guana Island seen from Tortola

- The location of Guana Island within the British Virgin Islands

- Location within British Virgin Islands Location within the Caribbean

Geography
- Location: Atlantic Ocean
- Coordinates: 18°28′30″N 64°34′15″W
- Archipelago: Virgin Islands

Administration
- United Kingdom
- British Overseas Territory: British Virgin Islands

Additional information
- Time zone: AST (UTC-4)
- ISO code: VG

Guana Island /ˈɡwɑːnə/ is an island of the British Virgin Islands (BVI) in the Caribbean. One of the few remaining privately owned islands in its part of the world, Guana has seven white powder-sand beaches and 850 acres (3.4 km^{2}) of tropical forest, mountains, hills, and valleys. The island is mostly natural preserve and has a small resort.

== History ==
In the 18th century, two Quaker families came to Guana as part of what was called "the Quaker Experiment" which lasted for about forty-five years in the BVI. They used African slaves and cultivated sugar cane. When they were recalled to the United States and England, they left behind two cannons still on Guana today. Archaeologists have extensively studied the Quaker ruins and have also unearthed older artifacts that give insight into Guana's earlier Amerindian history.

Beth and Louis Bigelow of Massachusetts purchased Guana in 1934. With the help of local men they built six stone cottages and developed a reputation as creative pioneers. Their guests - professionals, intellectuals and world travelers - came for months at a time, attracted to the simple but rich life.

== Current ==
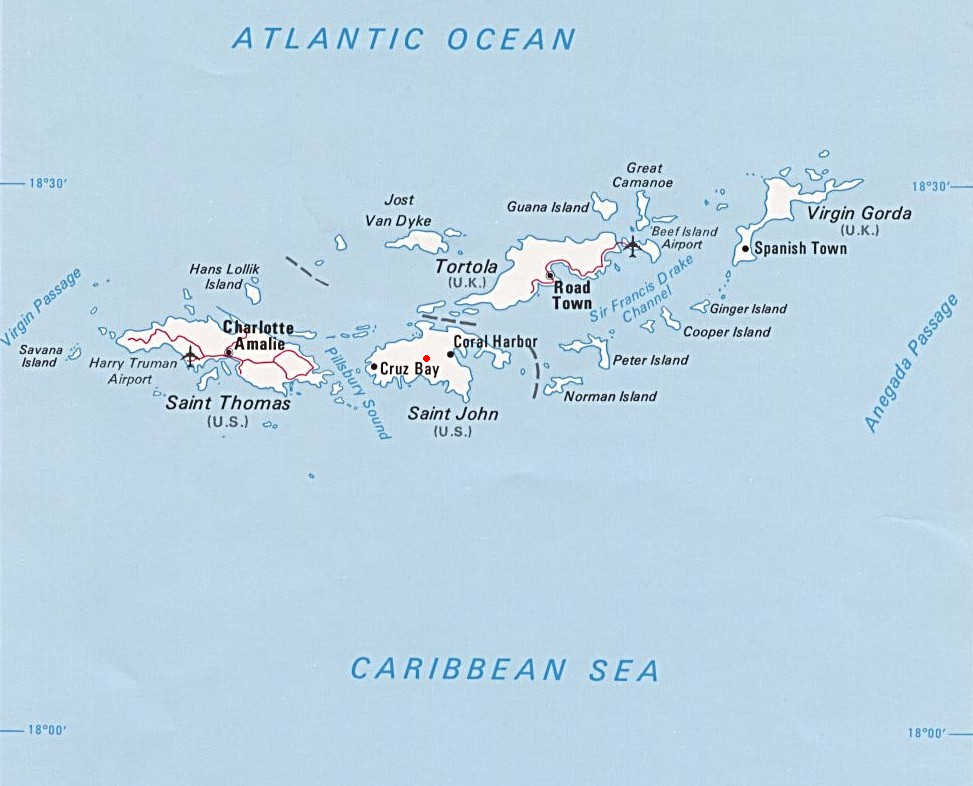
Location off the north-east coast of Tortola

Henry and Gloria Jarecki bought Guana in 1975 and began improving accommodations and other facilities with the goal of maintaining the island's historic style and ambiance. An interest in conservation led them to establish a long-term restoration program to protect the island's flora and fauna and bring back once-common species..

== Flora and fauna ==
Scientists say that Guana has more flora and fauna than any island of its size yet studied in the Caribbean and possibly the world.

The island provides habitat for the Puerto Rican racer (Alsophis portoricensis), the common Puerto Rican ameiva (Ameiva exsul), the crested anole (Anolis cristatellus wileyae), the sharp-mouthed lizard (Anolis pulchellus), barred anole (Anolis stratulus), green iguana (Iguana iguana), big-scaled least gecko (Sphaerodactylus macrolepis macrolepis), and the Richard's worm snake (Typhlops richardi).

The restoration program has brought extirpated species back to Guana and other Virgin Islands. The stout iguana had survived only on Anegada but now flourishes on Guana and lives on other islands as well. Other plant and animal species that have been restored and protected include the red-legged tortoise, the bridled quail-dove, the Caribbean flamingo, the white-crowned pigeon, Eggers' mallow tree, the Virgin Islands euphorb, Hohenberg's ground bromeliad, and a unique bromeliad found nowhere else.

Guana also has three reef areas. White Bay is a set of parallel patch reefs in shallow water, where there are no strong waves or currents. The reefs are home to about 100 tropical reef fishes, waving gorgonians called fan corals, and the various species of hard corals. Muskmelon Bay is a deep bay with reefs at 60 to 80 feet (24 m). Large, oceanic fishes like tuna and king mackerel may be seen there. North Bay is a windward, rough-water bay with deep reefs and wrecks.
