= Center for Plant Conservation =

Non-profit conserving rare plants

- Founded: 1984; Jamaica Plain, Massachusetts
- Purpose: Conservation biology
- Location: Escondido, California, United States
- Region served: United States
- Interim CEO: Scot Medbury
- Website: http://saveplants.org/

The Center for Plant Conservation (also known as CPC) is a non-profit organization that includes a network of over 81 participating institutions. Its primary mission is the conservation and restoration of rare native plants of the United States, its territories, and Canada. Within its network, the CPC supports regional plant conservation initiatives, including California Plant Rescue and Florida Plant Rescue.

== Overview ==
The Center for Plant Conservation (CPC) comprises a network of conservation partners, collectively referred to as CPC Participating Institutions (PIs). These institutions collaborate to conserve at-risk plant species in the United States and Canada. The CPC PIs are responsible for maintaining the CPC National Collection of Endangered Plants, a living conservation collection focused on imperiled plants. The CPC's efforts include collecting and managing living seeds and plants, researching threats and conservation strategies, and facilitating communication within its network to promote the conservation of these rare plants. Through its Rare Plant Academy and Best Practices Database, the CPC shares information, data, and expertise. Each year, the CPC's Star Award is given to an individual who demonstrates the dedication, cooperation, and personal investment necessary to conserve rare plants.

The CPC operates under the coordination of a national office and is overseen by a volunteer board of trustees. Its activities encompass developing standards and protocols, and implementing conservation programs in areas such as horticulture, research, restoration, and public awareness. The overarching goal of the CPC’s network is to prevent the extinction of rare plant species. The CPC collaborates with the United States Fish and Wildlife Service and is a member of the International Union for Conservation of Nature.
