= Headstarting =

Conservation technique for endangered species

Headstarting is a conservation technique for endangered species in which young animals are raised artificially and subsequently released into the wild. The technique allows a greater proportion of the young to reach independence, without predation or loss to other natural causes.

For endangered birds and reptiles, eggs are collected from the wild are hatched using an incubator. For mammals such as Hawaiian monk seals, the young are removed from their mothers after weaning.

The technique was trialled on land-based mammals for the first time in Australia. In the three years prior to May 2021, young bridled nail-tail wallabies were placed in a fenced-off area of 10-hectare (25-acre) area within Avocet Nature Refuge in Queensland. The population, safe from their main predator, feral cats, more than doubled over this period.
