= Franklin's Forest =

Important Bird Area of the Cayman Islands

Coordinates: 19°17′00″N 81°08′00″W

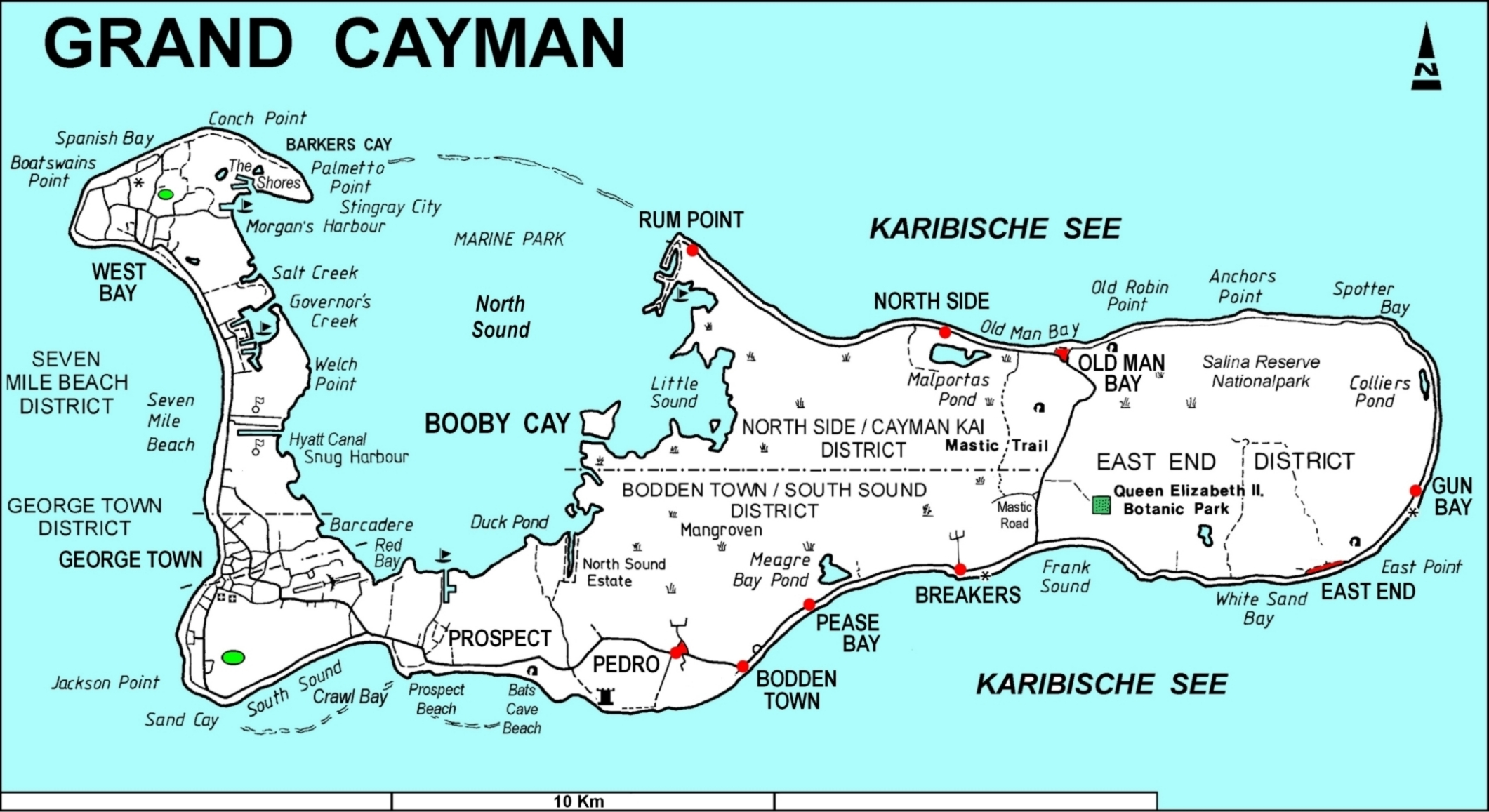
Map of Grand Cayman; Salina Reserve and Queen Elizabeth II Botanic Park are shown in the East End district of the island

Franklin's Forest is an important site for white-crowned pigeons

Franklin's Forest is an Important Bird Area (IBA) and a Key Biodiversity Area (KBA) located near the centre of the East End district of Grand Cayman, one of the Cayman Islands, a British Overseas Territory in the Caribbean Sea. The area is partially owned by the Crown; the rest is privately owned. Franklin's Forest, like the other privately owned forests on the island, is threatened by habitat loss.

== Description ==
Franklin's Forest is a 111 ha tract of native tropical dry forest bordered by Conocarpus wetlands and farmland. It lies south of the Salina Reserve and east of Queen Elizabeth II Botanic Park. It is entirely unprotected and partly privately owned, the rest of the land having "recently" (as of 2006) been purchased by the Crown.

=== Birds ===
Franklin's Forest was identified as an IBA by BirdLife International because it supports populations of white-crowned pigeons, Cuban amazons, Caribbean elaenias, thick-billed vireos, Yucatan vireos and vitelline warblers. The largest flocks of Cuban amazons, in numbers upwards of 150, cluster near the edge of a fruit plantation. The now-extinct Grand Cayman thrush was last spotted in Franklin's Forest in 1938. As with the other stretches of privately owned and unprotected forest in the Cayman Islands, Franklin's Forest and its birds are threatened by habitat loss due to clearing of the forest. Illegal shooting of parrots also occurs; over 200 were shot in 2000 alone.
