= Botanic Park and Salina Reserve Important Bird Area =

Coordinates: 19°19′00″N 81°10′00″W

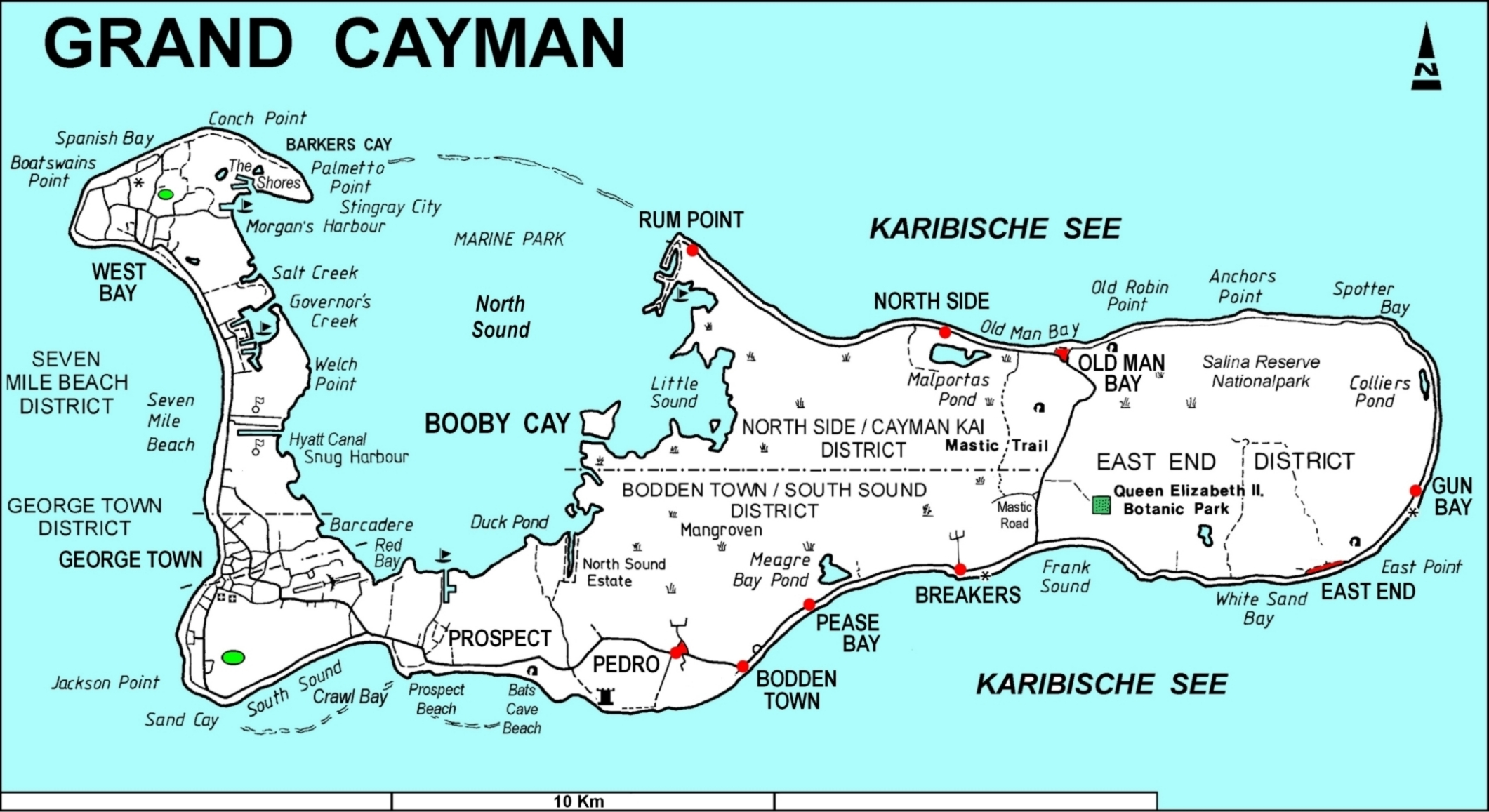
Map of Grand Cayman showing Queen Elizabeth II Botanic Park and Salina Reserve in the East End district of the island

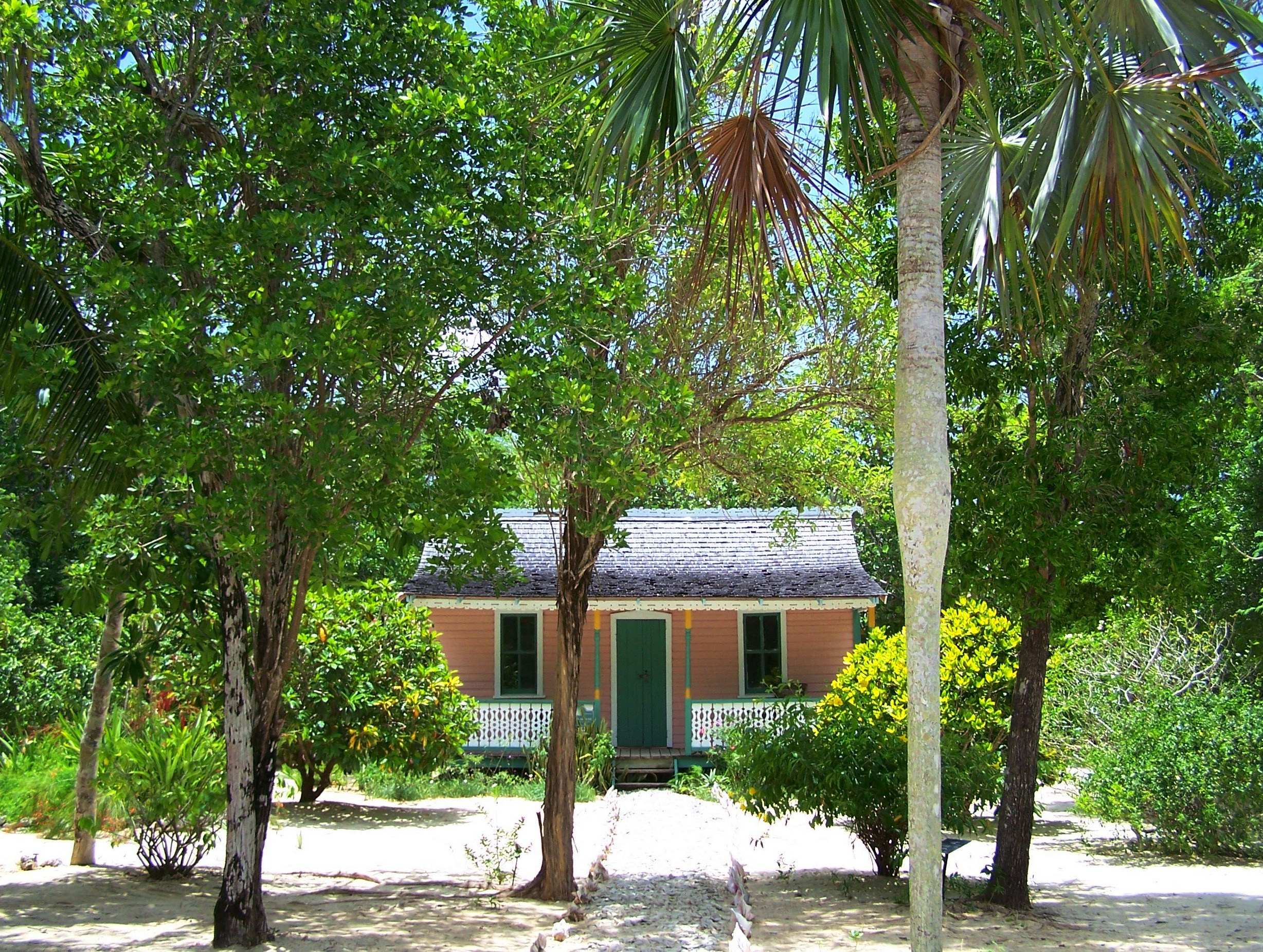
Restored traditional house and sand garden in the Queen Elizabeth II Botanic Park

The Botanic Park and Salina Reserve Important Bird Area comprises two separate sites on Grand Cayman, one of the Cayman Islands, a British Overseas Territory in the Caribbean Sea.

== Description ==
Both sites lie in the East End district of Grand Cayman. The 50 ha Queen Elizabeth II Botanic Park in the centre of the island contains fragments of native dry forest and shrubland, with a lake and button mangrove (Conocarpus erectus) dominated wetlands. The Botanic Park site is also largely surrounded by the Frank Sound Forest IBA.

Salina Reserve, lying inland from the north-east coast, is a 125 ha freshwater herbaceous wetland. It is surrounded by a fringe of Typha sedgeland and Conocarpus shrubland, with 135 ha of West Indian mahogany (Swietenia mahagoni), dominated dry forest on the northern boundary. Endemic plants in the reserve include false foxglove (Agalinis kingsii), corato and silver-thatched palm. The Caymans national plant Banana orchid occurs in a 4 hectares (9.9 acres) extension, purchased by the RSPB and the Rainforest Trust in 2020.

The reserve lies over the northern part of the largest freshwater lens in the eastern part of the island and is not easily accessible.

=== Birds ===
The two sites, with a combined area of 276 ha, have been identified by BirdLife International as an Important Bird Area (IBA) because it supports populations of West Indian whistling ducks (with 10 breeding pairs), white-crowned pigeons, Cuban amazons (10 pairs), Caribbean elaenias, thick-billed and Yucatan vireos, and vitelline warblers.
