= Frank Sound Forest =

Coordinates: 19°20′00″N 81°09′00″W

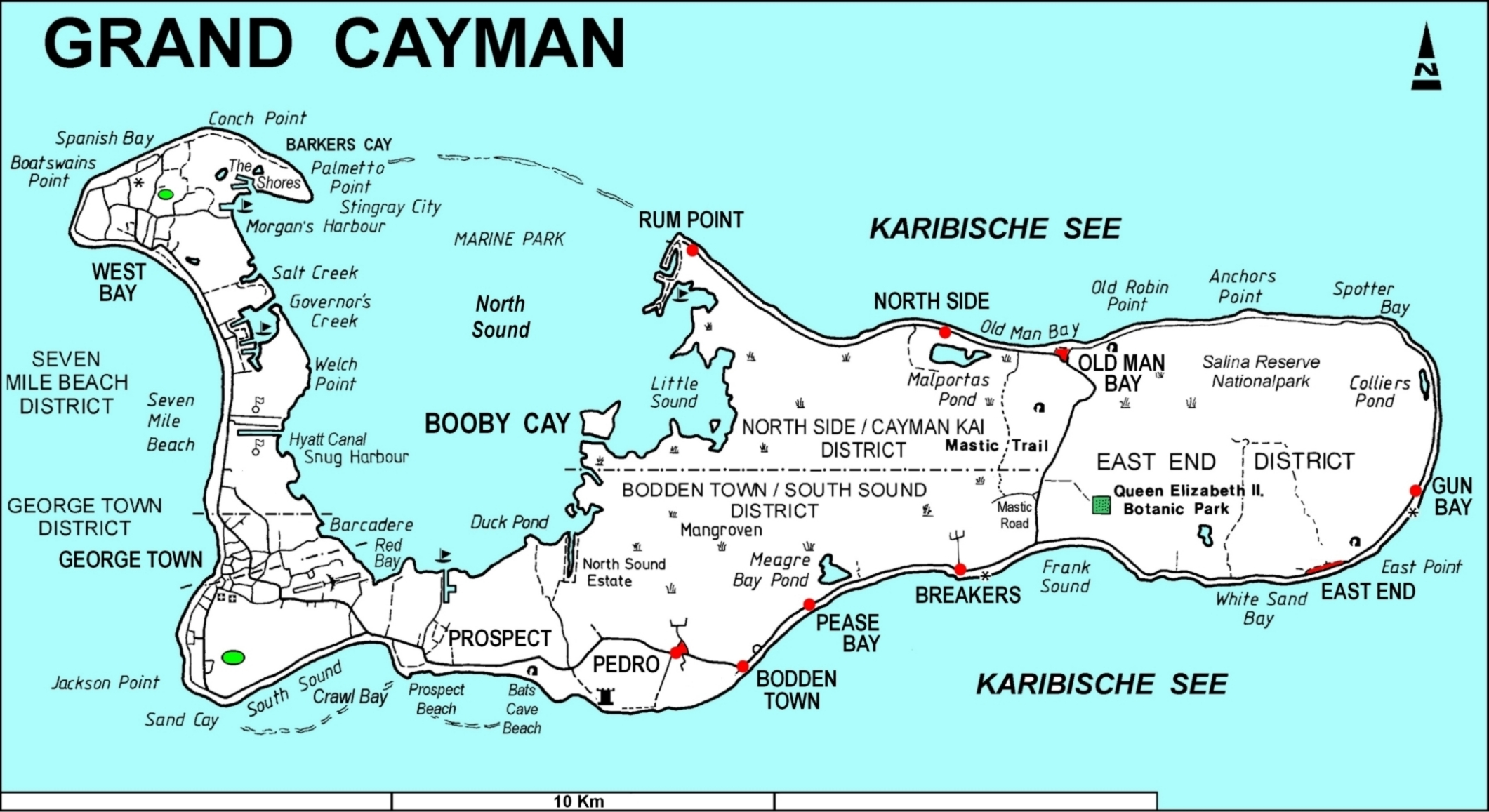
Map of Grand Cayman; Frank Sound and Queen Elizabeth II Botanic Park are shown in the south-west part of the East End district of the island

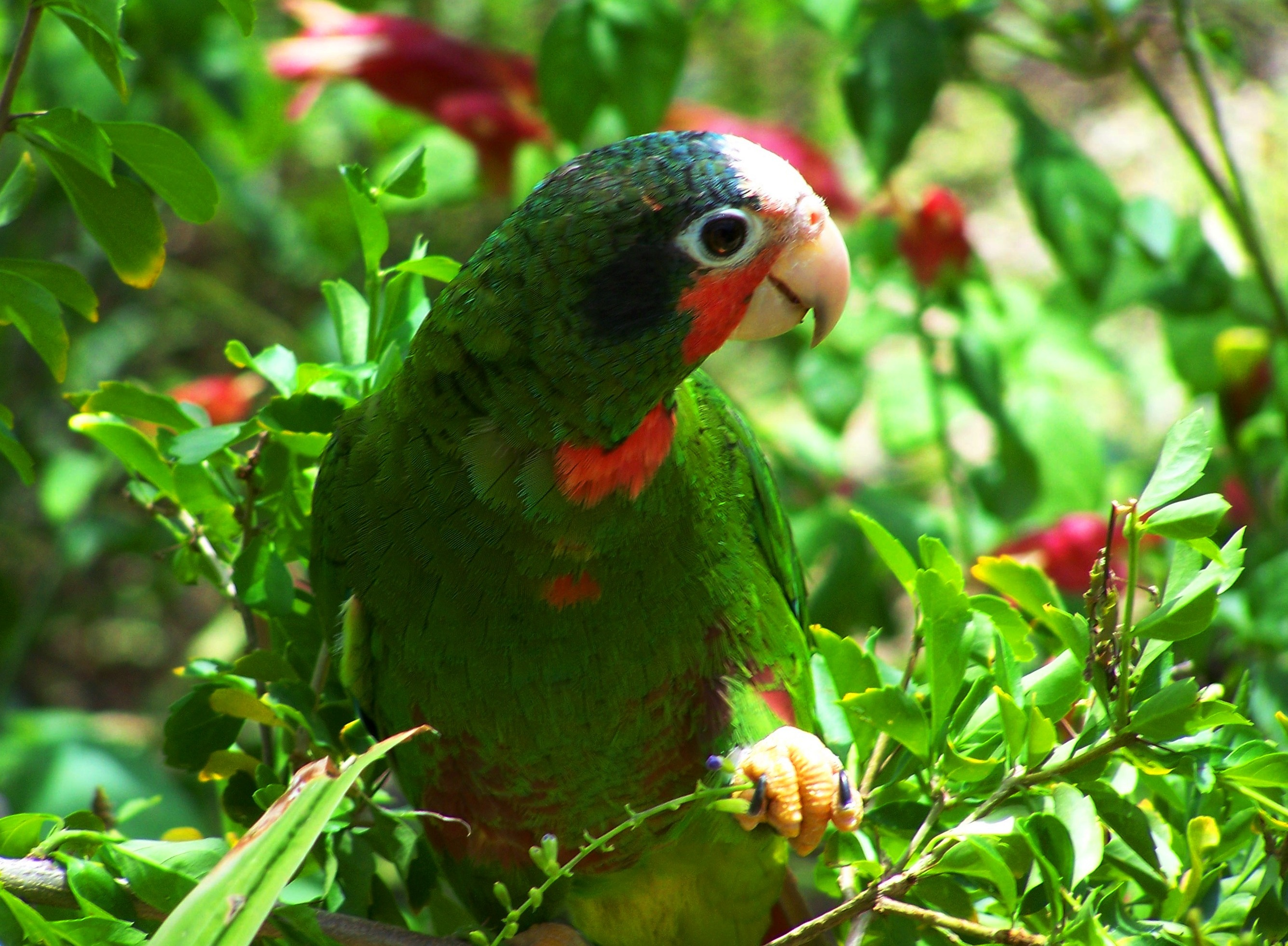
Cuban amazon, Grand Cayman subspecies

Frank Sound Forest lies near the southern coast of the East End district of Grand Cayman, one of the Cayman Islands, a British Overseas Territory in the Caribbean Sea. It is one of the territory's Important Bird Areas (IBAs).

== Description ==
Frank Sound Forest is a 223 ha tract of native tropical dry forest surrounding Queen Elizabeth II Botanic Park. it is privately owned, unprotected and is subject to fragmentation and clearance for agricultural and urban development.

=== Birds ===
The IBA was identified as such by BirdLife International because it supports populations of Cuban amazons, Caribbean elaenias, thick-billed vireos, Yucatan vireos and vitelline warblers.
