= Queen Elizabeth II Botanic Park =

Non-profit outdoor garden

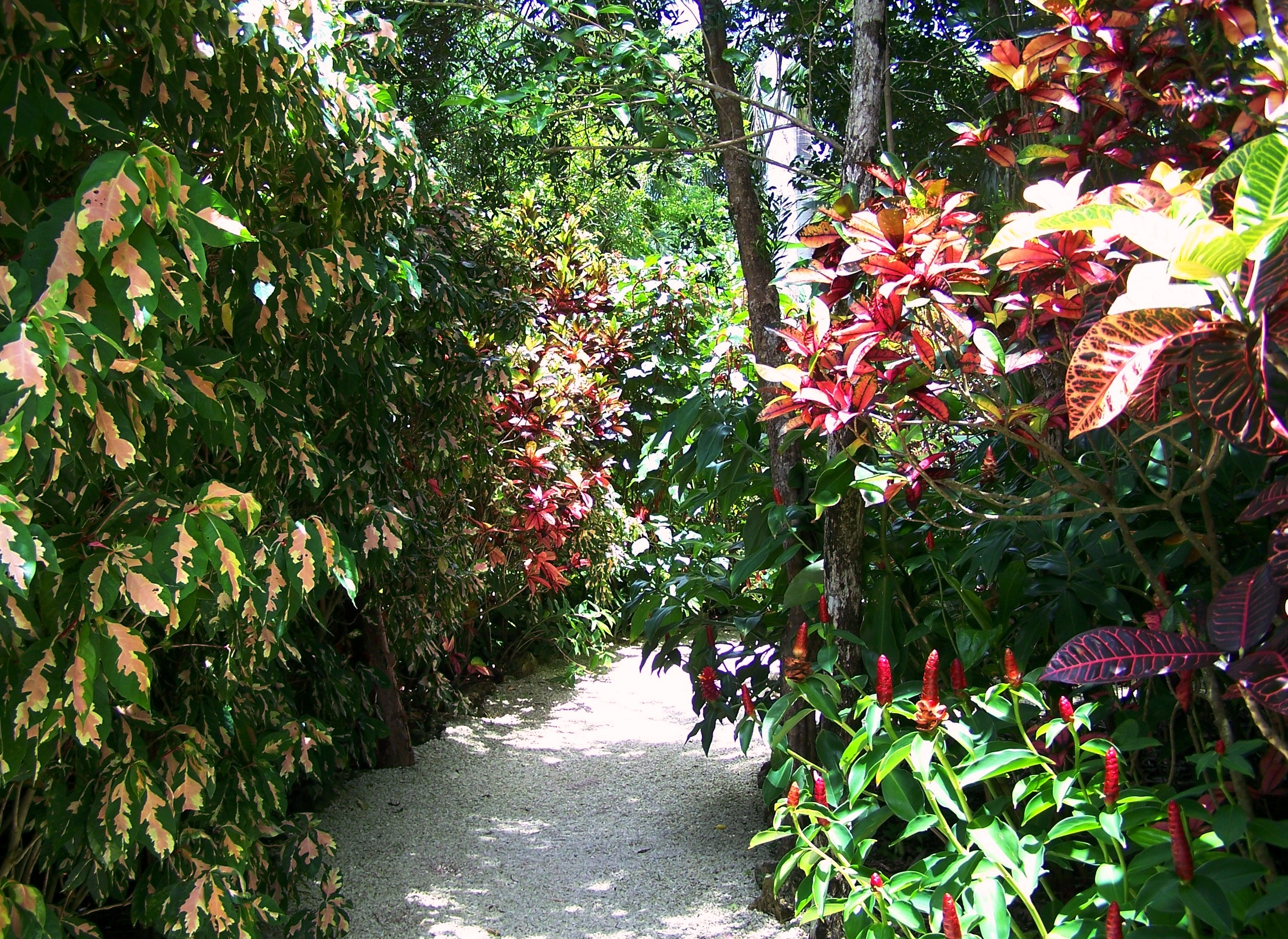
- Floral Colour Garden trail at QEII Botanic Park, Grand Cayman
- Interactive map of Queen Elizabeth II Botanic Park
- Type: Botanical garden
- Location: North Side District, Grand Cayman Island
- Coordinates: 19.31596°N 81.16788°W
- Area: 65 acres (26 ha)
- Created: 1994
- Operator: Cayman Islands Government and the National Trust for the Cayman Islands

Queen Elizabeth II Botanic Park is a non-profit outdoor garden and wildlife facility located in the North Side District of Grand Cayman Island in the British West Indies. The park is owned jointly by the Cayman Islands Government and the National Trust for the Cayman Islands, a group dedicated to preserving natural environments and places of historic significance in the Cayman Islands. Opened in 1994 with only the Woodland Trail completed, the park now also contains the Floral Colour Garden, a Cayman Heritage Garden, a lake, an orchid boardwalk exhibit, and a Blue Iguana Habitat. Also inside the park is a gift shop and a visitor's interpretive center, the starting point from which visitors can enter the Woodland Trail and other garden grounds.

== Park history and conservation ==
Planning for the botanic park began in the late 1980s with master plans being drawn up by landscape and cultural heritage planner Carl Bray. The park was officially opened in 1994 by Queen Elizabeth II. At the time of the park's opening, only the Woodland Trail was completed; the remainder of the park was completed section by section in the ensuing years.

The park also serves the natural conservation needs of the Cayman Islands as a protected area. The forest surrounded by the Woodland Trail and south of the lake area is protected in order to assist in conserving flora and fauna native to the Cayman Islands. Plants unique to the Cayman Islands have been planted and cared throughout the managed areas of the park. The park forms part of the Botanic Park and Salina Reserve Important Bird Area, identified as such by BirdLife International because it supports populations of several threatened or restricted-range bird species. It is surrounded by the Frank Sound Forest Important Bird Area.

== Natural exhibits ==
=== Woodland Trail and Blue Iguana Habitat ===
The park's Woodland Trail was the first natural exhibit to open when the park was dedicated in 1994. It currently is estimated to hold more than 50% of flora native to the Cayman Islands. The trail was built to allow those visiting a unique and safe view of the natural landscape that takes up much of Grand Cayman Island. The four-fifths of a mile long trail encompasses approximately 40 acres and showcases several habitats that feature the rare and native Cockspur trees (Erythrina velutina) and Bull Thatch palms (Thrinax radiata). The trail winds through areas that contain swamp, dry soil, and areas where Mahogany trees can be seen reaching across the trail and overhead.

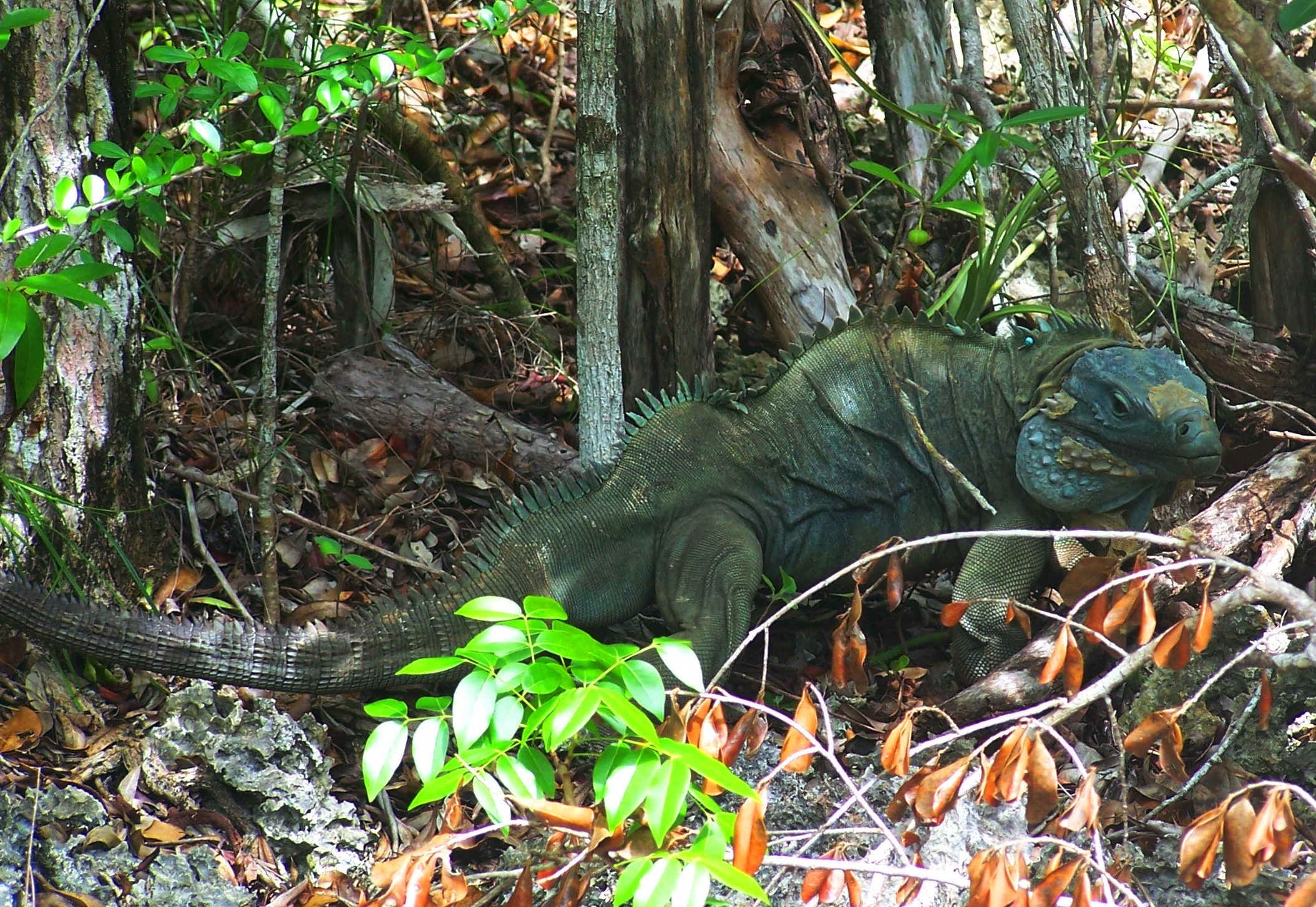
Blue Iguana on Wilderness Trail, Queen Elizabeth II Botanic Park

About halfway along the trail is the Blue Iguana Habitat, developed and run by National Trust of Cayman Islands Blue Iguana Recovery Program. Through the careful administration and stewardship of the program by the National Trust, repopulation is the program's focus as the Blue Iguana (Cyclura lewisi) is native to the Cayman Islands still considered an endangered reptile species. Breeding in captivity within the confines of the habitat has been successful since inception and the breeding goal has been set by the National Trust at 1000 and breeding in captivity with an ultimate repopulation goal of 1000. The reptile is frequently seen roaming in the wooded areas surrounding the Wilderness Trail as well as the grounds of the park.

=== Cayman Heritage Garden ===
The Cayman Heritage Garden showcases plants that have been a part of Caymanian life since settlers first arrived. The garden includes several areas that represent historical agricultural significance in the Cayman Islands.

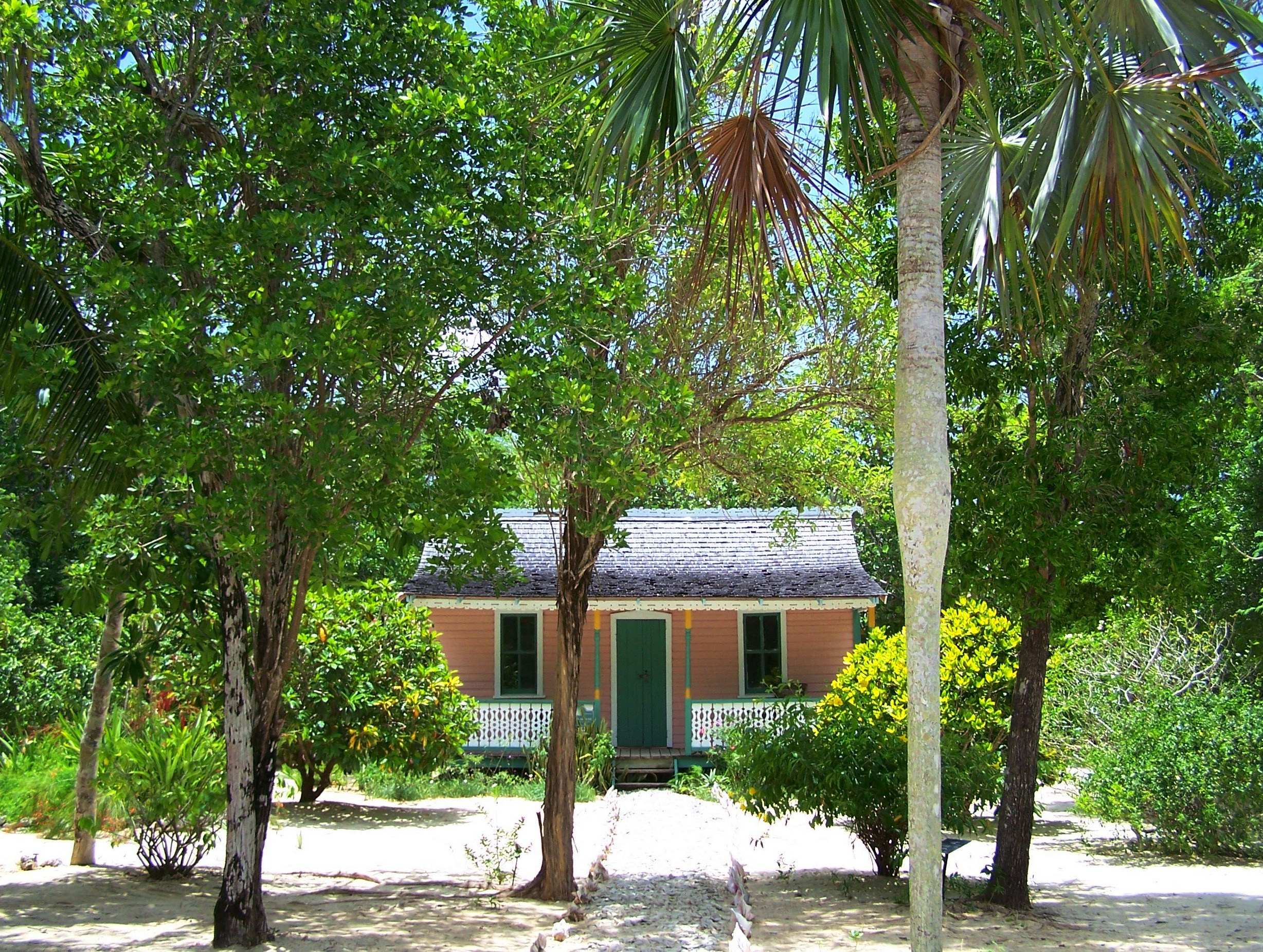
Restored early 20th-century Caymanian home and surrounding sand garden at QEII Botanic Park, Grand Cayman

Among these plants are: root crops and vegetables grown and harvested throughout Cayman history; the Silver Thatch Palm (Coccothrinax proctorii), an economically viable tree that provided the means for Caymanians to make thatch rope to use, sell, and trade; a medicinal garden that shows the types of plants Caymanians would utilize to homeopathically treat illness and injury; a sand garden surrounding a more-than-century-old Caymanian house, formerly owned by Julius Rankine, an East End settler; a fruit tree orchard containing banana, breadfruit, and mango trees. The Rankine home was restored after being brought to the park and the sand garden planted and developed to display traditional ornamental plants that would be found around such a home on Grand Cayman in the early 20th century.

=== Floral Colour Garden ===
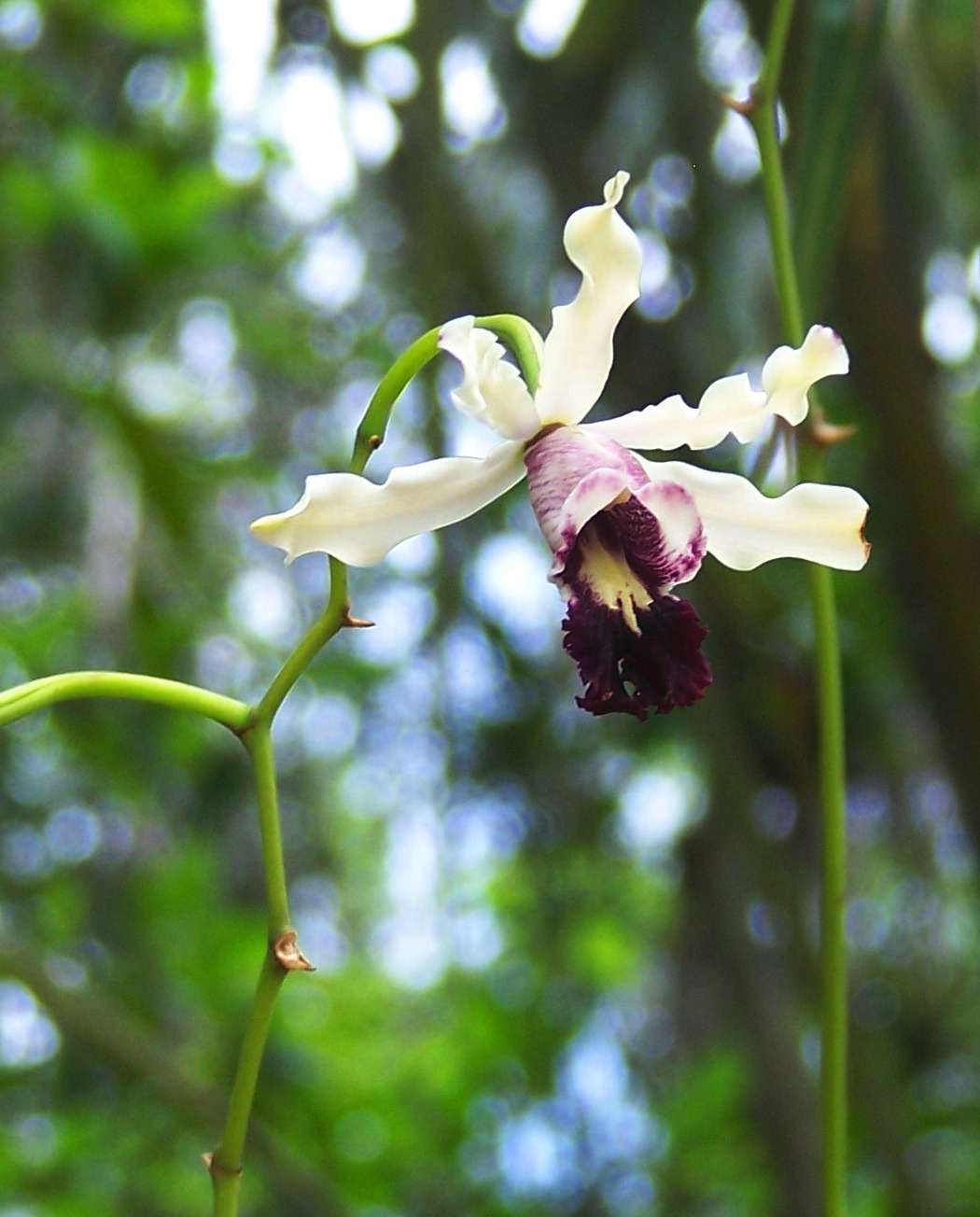
Wild Banana Orchid, QEII Botanic Park, Grand Cayman

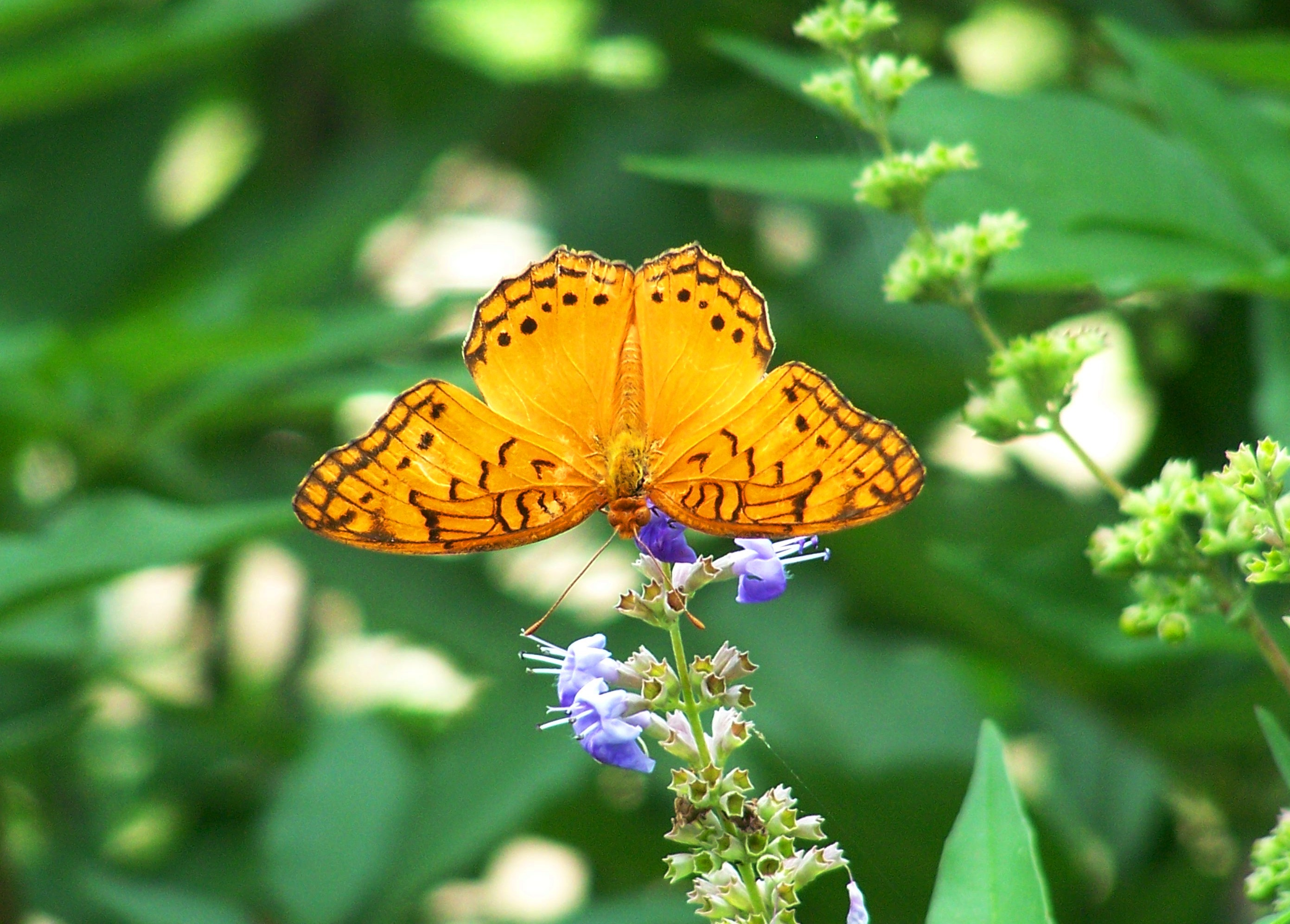
Butterfly at QEII Botanical Park, Grand Cayman

The Floral Colour Garden includes a gravel pathway leading through large stands of wooded areas containing native trees along with open grassy spaces, gazebos, and arbors. The garden was designed to emphasize a specific colour layout beginning with pink and then moving into red, orange, yellow, white, blue, purple, and lavender. Arbors, trellises, and gazebos round out the garden and give it a serene, peaceful look and feel. 56 different butterfly varieties—5 of which are endemic to the Cayman Islands—live on Grand Cayman Island and are frequently seen on and around the colorful array of flora in the Colour Garden.

=== Orchid exhibit ===
A recently completed Orchid Garden and boardwalk features ten varieties of orchids, with three of the ten varieties only being found in the Cayman Islands. One of the three is Cayman's national flower, the endemic Grand Cayman Wild Banana Orchid Myrmecophila thomsoniana var. thomsoniana; it varies from the Little Cayman and Cayman Brac endemic Banana Orchid, Myrmecophila thomsoniana var. minor. Other native orchids on display and growing in the exhibit include the Tolumnia variegata.

=== Lake ===
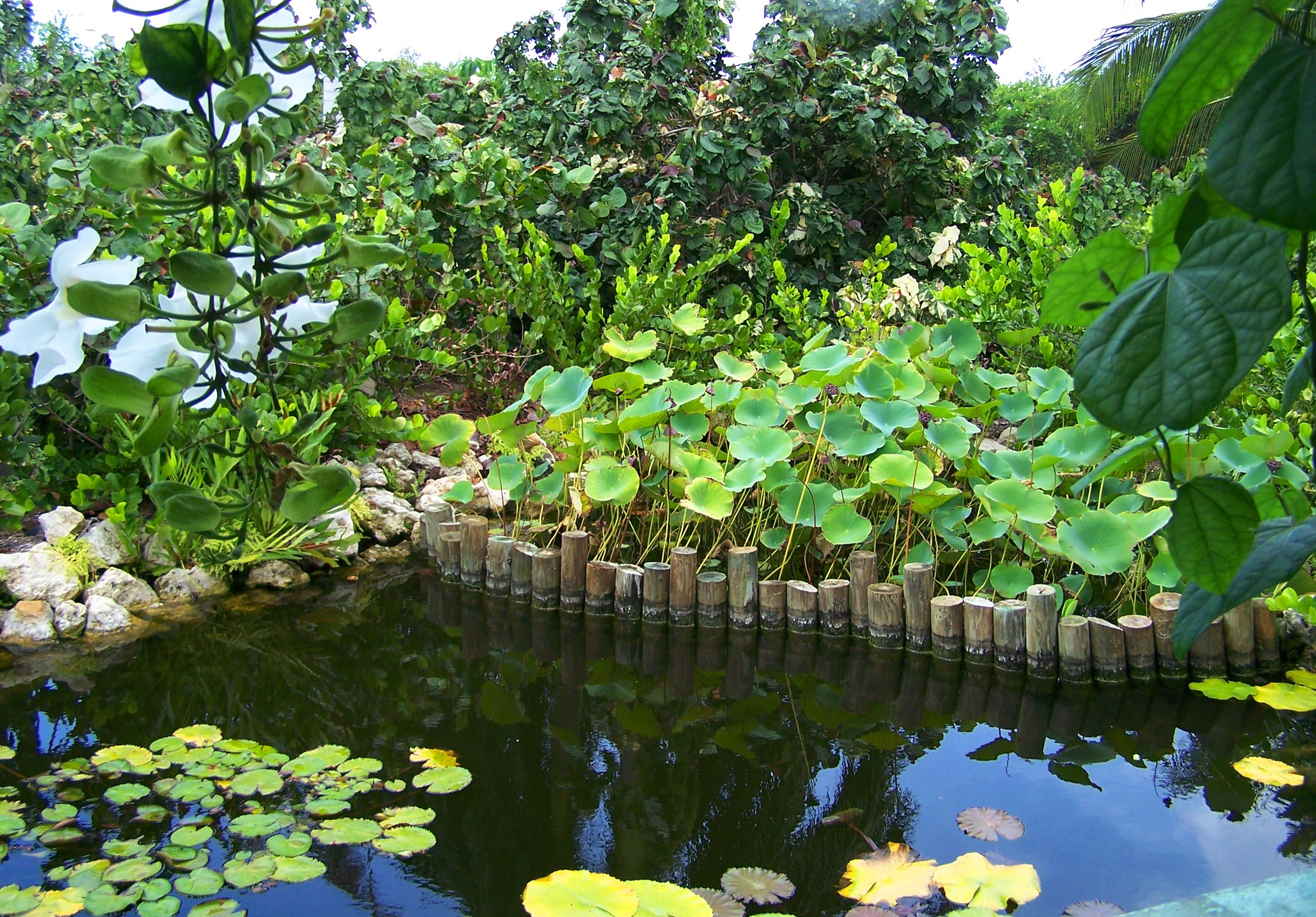
Lake and lily pads adjacent to Floral Colour Garden

The lake adjoins the Floral Colour Garden and covers approximately three acres. Prior to the Botanic Park's current state of gardens, trails, and natural exhibits existed a natural wetland that was part of a Buttonwood (Conocarpus erectus) swamp. During the planning stage, park developers decided to develop the swampland into a small lake that would serve as an aquatic bird habitat for several species along with the threatened West Indian Whistling Duck (Dendrocygna arborea). This aquatic habitat at the Botanic Park has become increasingly important as the wetlands on Grand Cayman Island continue to be lost to development. With the birds that gather here as well the aquatic plant life, lake is a popular spot for photographers visiting the park. Because it is landlocked without any feeding tributaries, the lake varies in size throughout the year, depending on the rainy season to fill it up.

== Other attractions and events ==
The botanic park also has a plant nursery available where plants seen inside the various natural exhibits can be purchased. As the various garden areas have been developed and completed, weddings have become a popular event at the park. Art exhibits are also a frequent event at the botanic park. Annually, the botanic park is host to the Orchid Show, hosted by the park and the Cayman Islands Orchid Society. An exhibition of locally grown orchids as well as a specialty orchid plant sale; the show also promotes the conservation of the native orchids found in the Cayman Islands. The show is held annually in March.

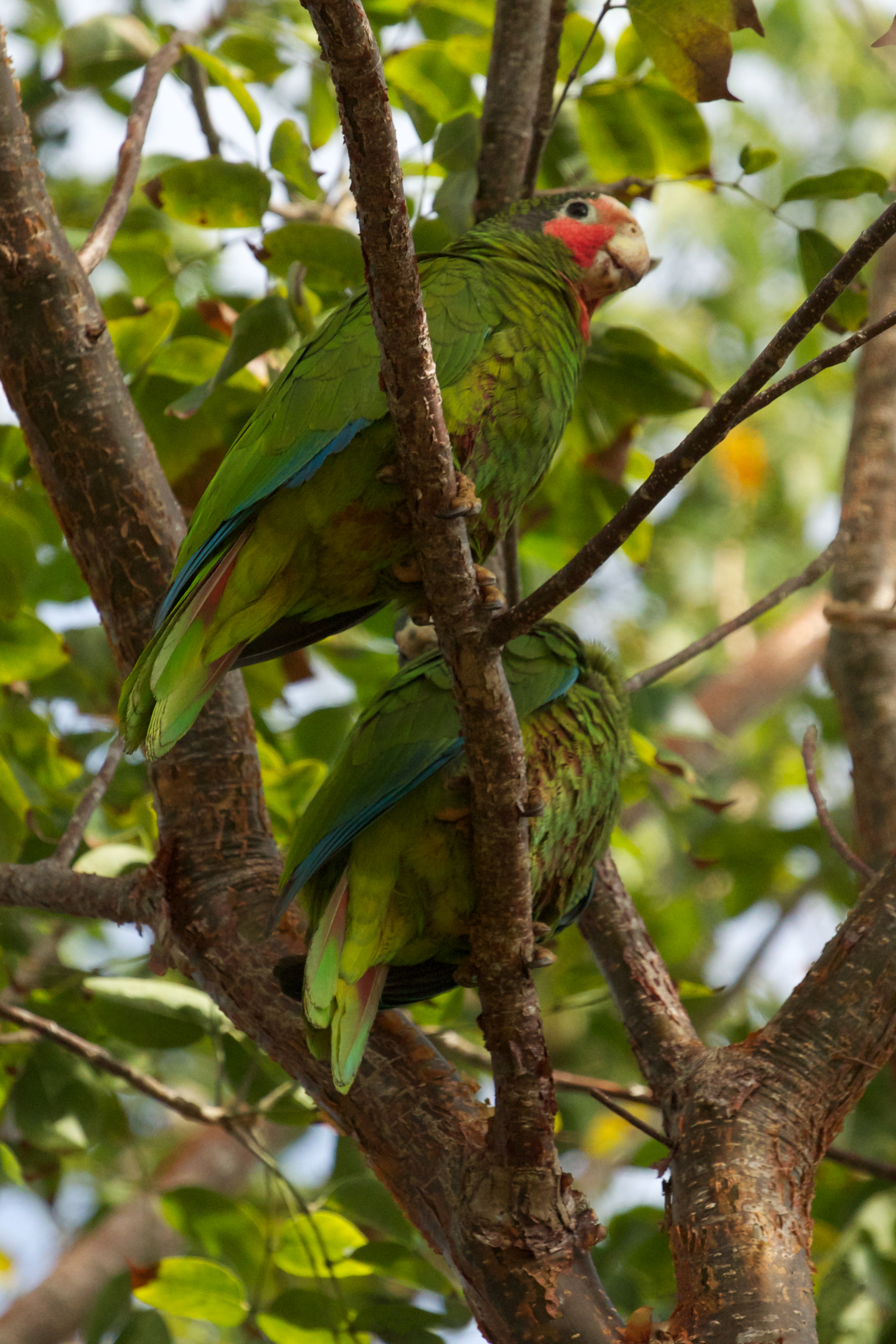
Cuban amazons (Amazona leucocephala), Queen Elizabeth II Botanic Park

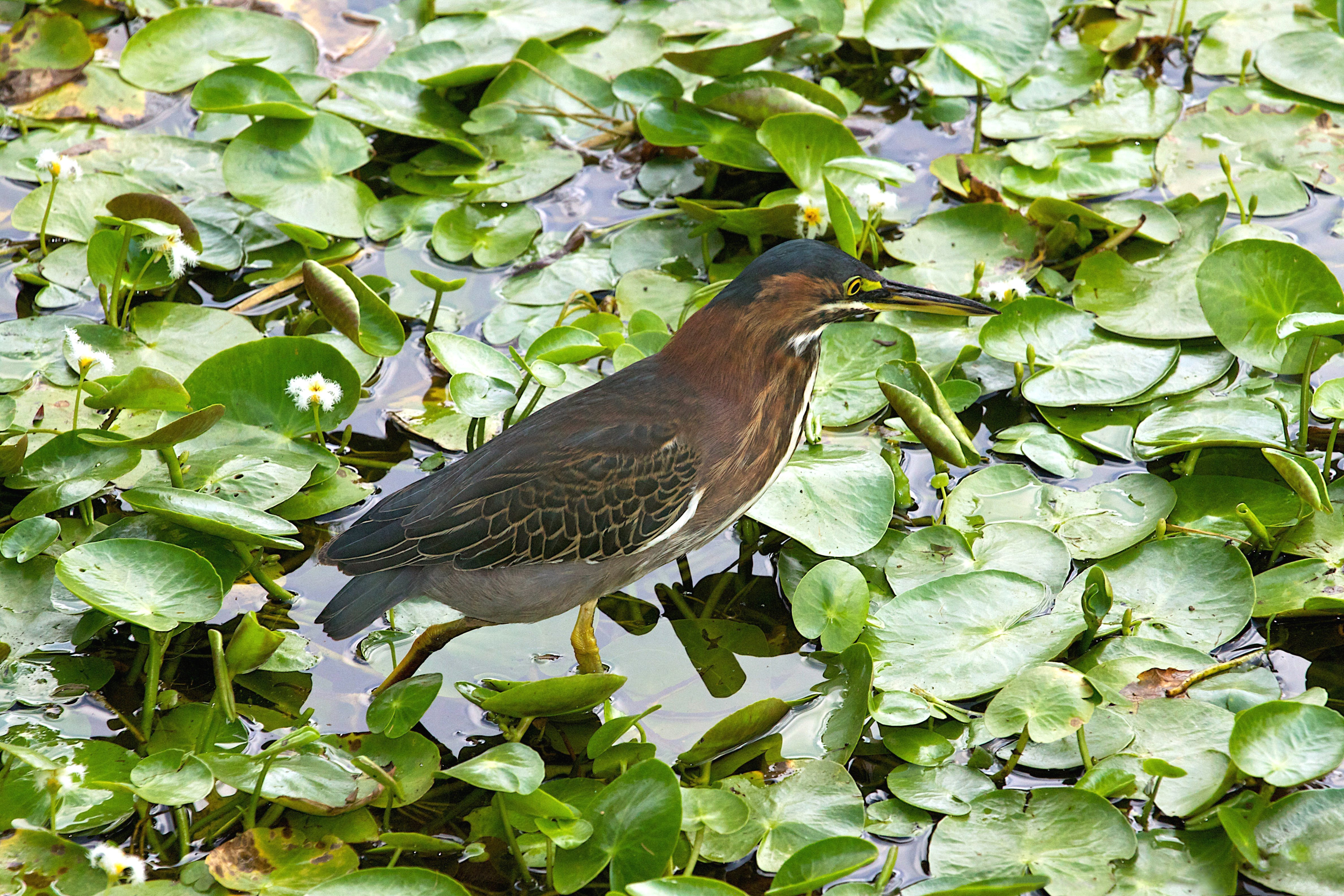
Green heron (Butorides virescens), Queen Elizabeth II Botanic Park

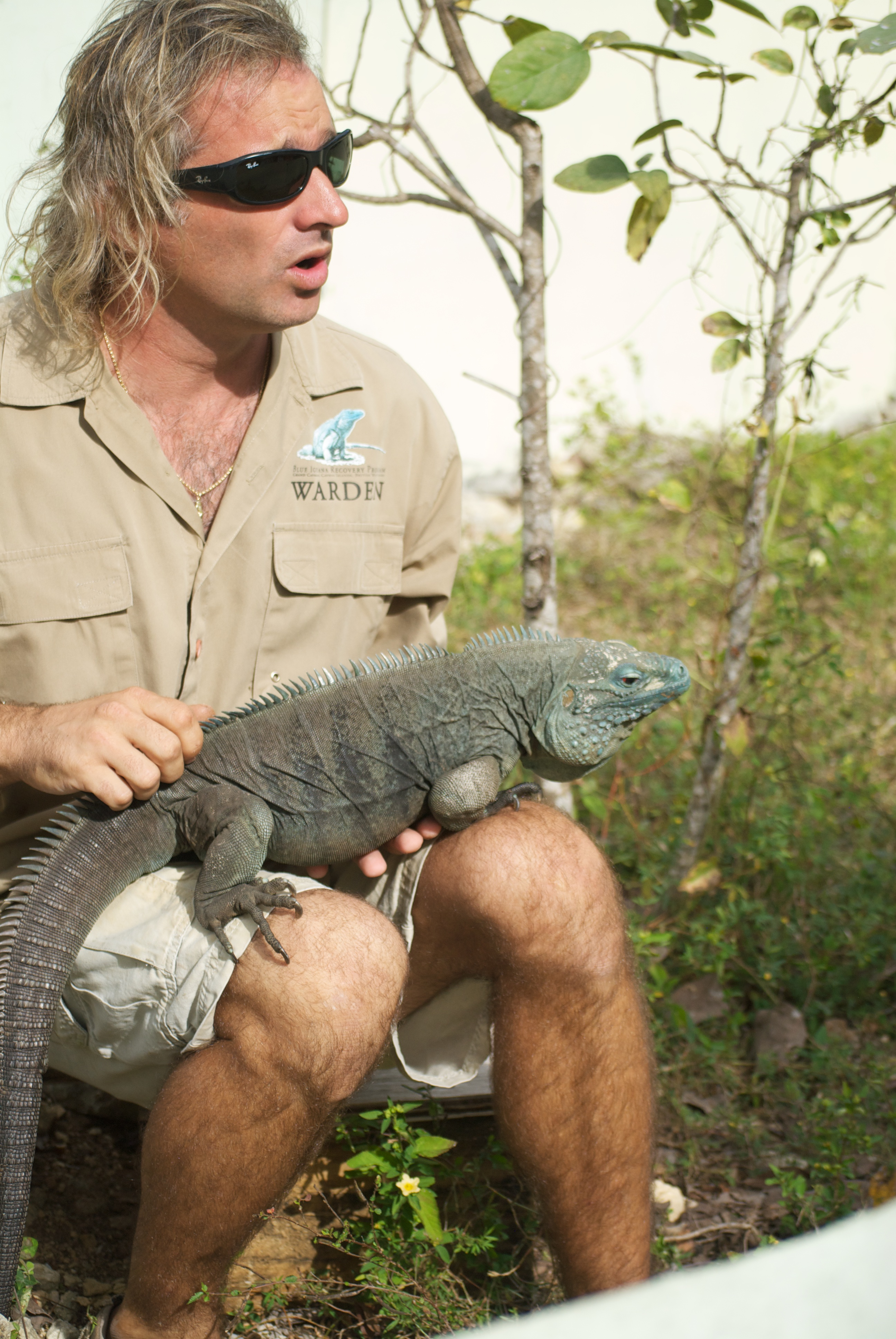
Blue iguana (Cyclura lewisi), The warden is educating tourists about the iguana, Queen Elizabeth II Botanic Park

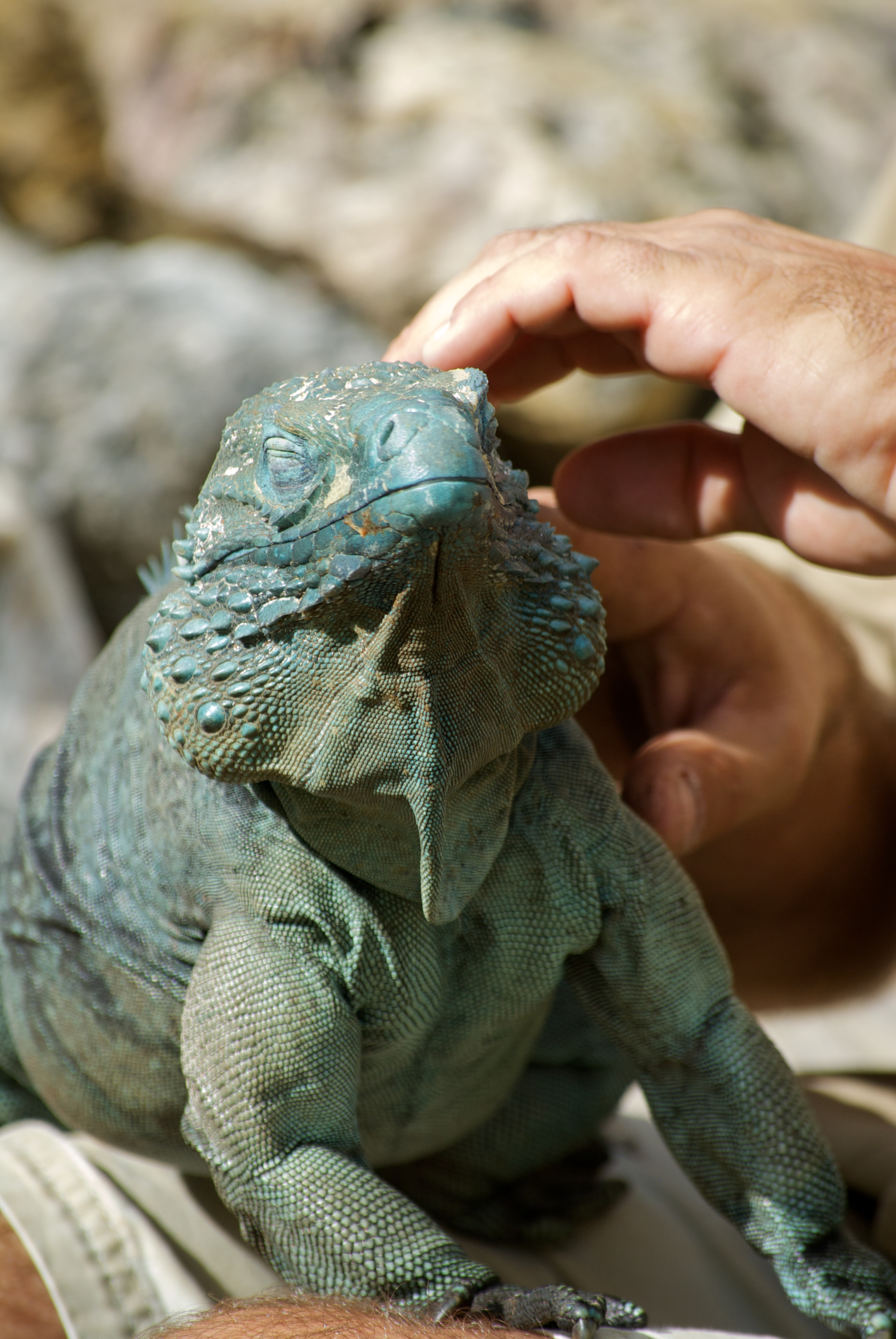
Blue iguana (Cyclura lewisi), Queen Elizabeth II Botanic Park

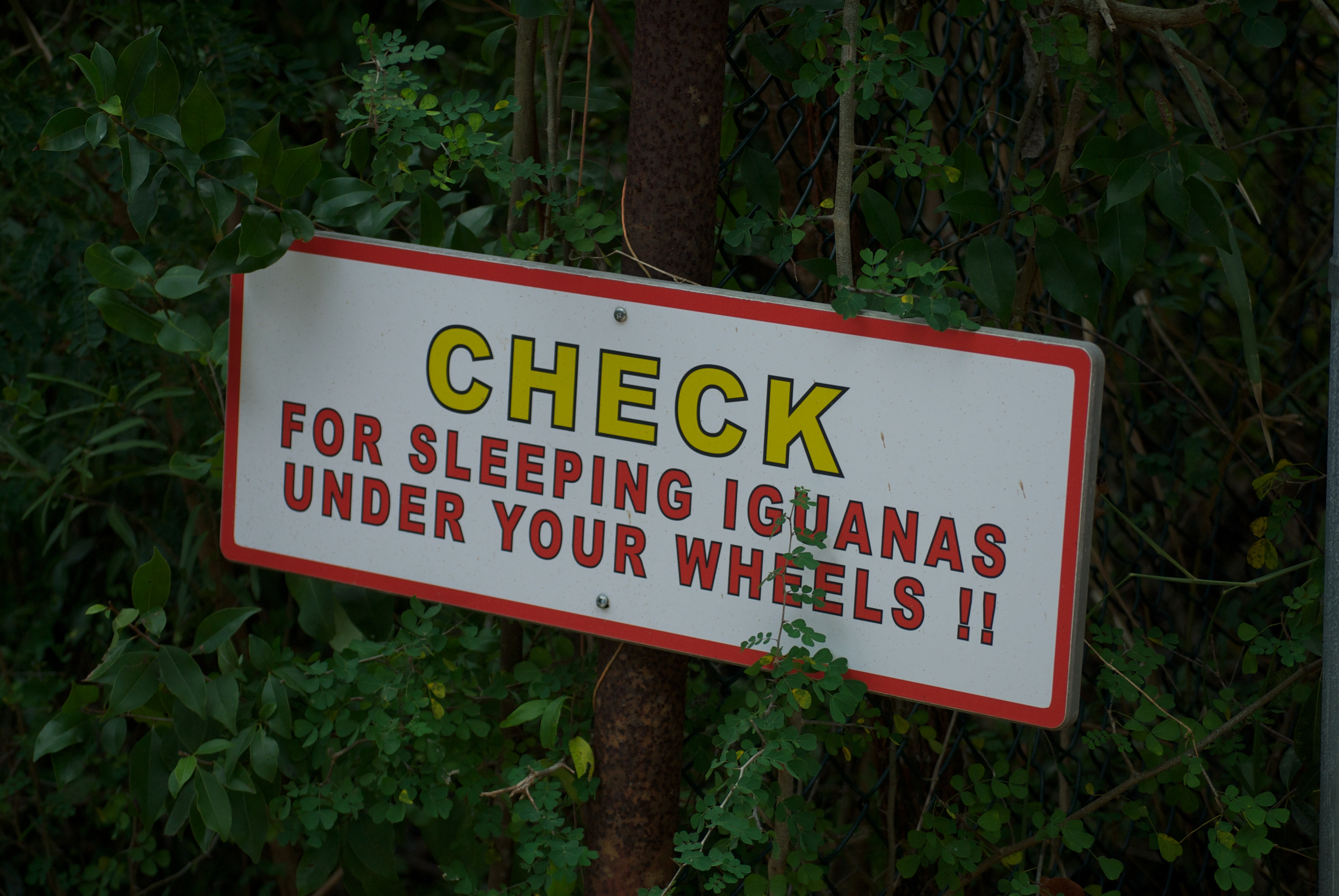
The sign warns drivers about accidentally driving over endangered Blue iguanas, which are kept at the park, Queen Elizabeth II Botanic Park

== See also ==
- Mastic Reserve
