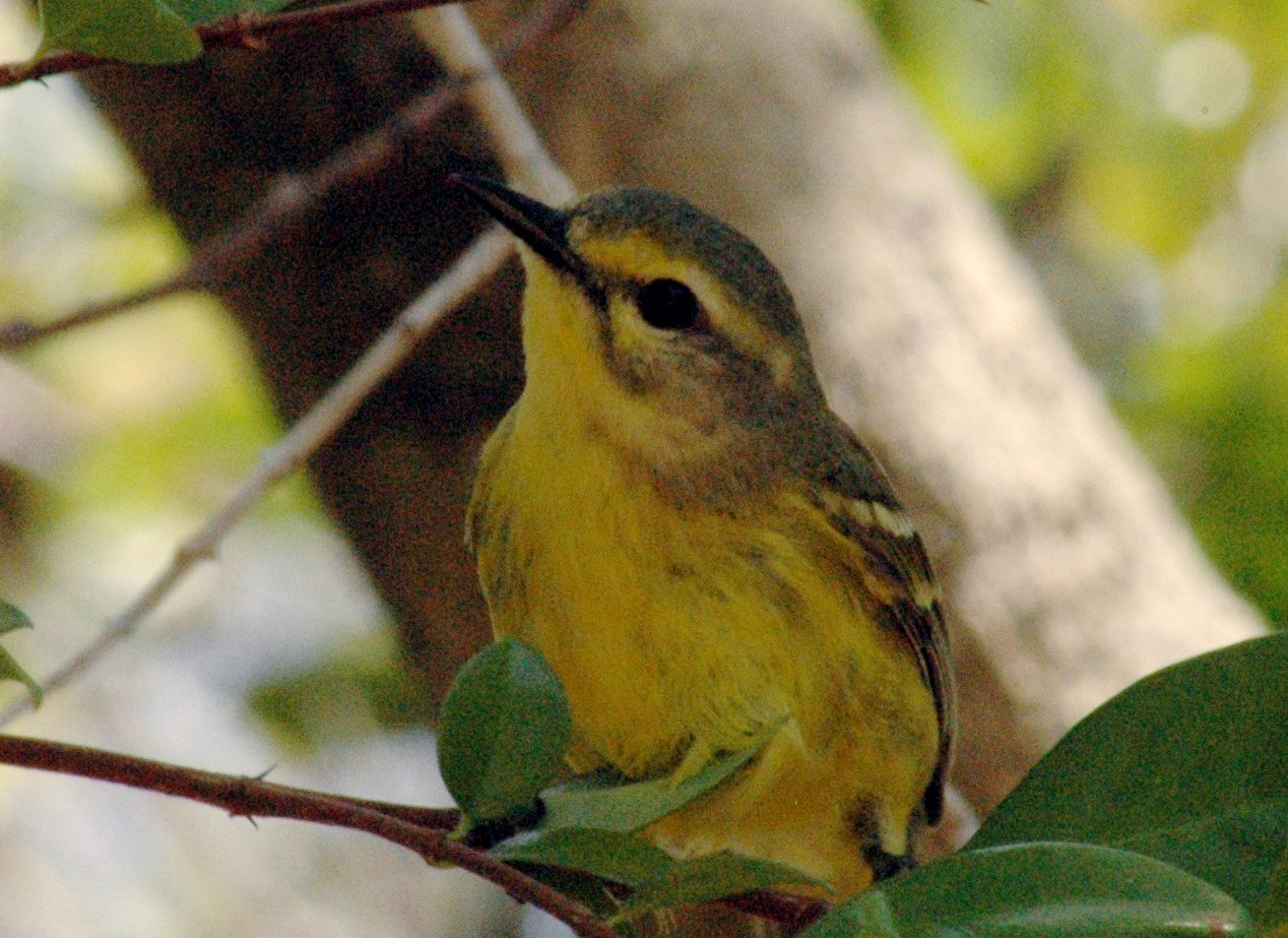

Conservation status
- Near Threatened (IUCN 3.1)

Scientific classification
- Kingdom: Animalia
- Phylum: Chordata
- Class: Aves
- Order: Passeriformes
- Family: Parulidae
- Genus: Setophaga
- Species: S. vitellina

Binomial name
- Setophaga vitellina (Cory, 1886)

Synonyms
- Dendroica vitellina

= Vitelline warbler =

Species of bird

The vitelline warbler (Setophaga vitellina) is a Near Threatened species of bird in the family Parulidae, the New World warblers. It is found in the Cayman Islands and on the Swan Islands of Honduras.

== Taxonomy and systematics ==
The vitelline warbler was formally described by Charles B. Cory in 1886 as Dendroica vitellina. Beginning in 2011 taxonomic systems merged genus Dendroica into its present genus Setophaga. Cory noted similarities between the vitelline warbler and the prairie warbler (Setophaga discolor) and some taxonomists have treated them as conspecific. The two are sister species.

The species' specific epithet and English name derive from the Latin vitellinus for vitelline, a deep yellow color with a red tinge like an egg yolk.

The vitelline warbler has these three subspecies:

- S. v. nelsoni (Bangs, 1919)
- S. v. vitellina (Cory, 1886)
- S. v. crawfordi (Nicoll, 1901)

== Description ==
The vitelline warbler is 13 cm (5.1 in) long and weighs 6.2 to 7.5 g (0.22 to 0.26 oz). Adult males of the nominate subspecies S. v. vitellina have an olive-green crown and nape, a wide yellow supercilium, a thin olive-green line through the eye, and yellow ear coverts with a thin olive-green lower and back border. Their upperparts are bright olive-green and their wings and tail mostly so. Their greater and median upperwing coverts have yellowish ends that show as two wing bars. Their outer three pairs of tail feathers have white tips. Their underparts are bright yellow with faint blurry olive streaks on the flanks. Females are slightly duller than males with a fainter border to the ear coverts. Juveniles have a pale grayish or grayish brown head and upperparts, faint pale buff wing bars, and a whitish throat and underparts. Their belly and undertail coverts have a yellowish tinge and the sides of their breast and flanks have a grayish brown wash. Subspecies S. v. crawfordi has a less well defined facial pattern than the nominate, has paler and yellower upperparts, and lacks the olive flank streaks. S. v. nelsoni is intermediate between the other two subspecies. Both sexes of all subspecies have a dark iris, a blackish bill, and blackish brown legs and feet.

== Distribution and habitat ==
The nominate subspecies of the vitelline warbler is found on Grand Cayman Island, S. v. crawfordi on Little Cayman and Cayman Brac, and S. v. nelsoni on the Swan Islands off northern Honduras. The species inhabits several low-stature arid to dry landscapes including scrubby woodland, forest regenerating after logging, and coastal scrublands. It sometimes is also found in urban areas.

== Behavior ==
=== Movement ===
The vitelline warbler is a sedentary year-round resident.

=== Feeding ===
The diet and foraging behavior of the vitelline warbler have not been studied. The species is assumed to feed on insects and other arthropods and to forage in the lower to middle levels of its habitat.

=== Breeding ===
The vitelline warbler's breeding season has not been defined but includes April to June. Its nest is a cup that typically is in a bush between about 0.6 and 2.6 m (2 and 9 ft) above the ground. The clutch is two eggs. Nothing else is known about the species' breeding biology.

=== Vocalization ===
The vitelline warbler's song is "a series of 4–5 wheezy and slightly grating notes which rise in pitch". Its call is not known but is assumed to be similar to the chek of the prairie warbler.

== Status ==
The IUCN originally in 1988 assessed the vitelline warbler as Threatened and since 1994 as Near Threatened. It has a small range; its population size is not known and is believed to be decreasing. "Proposed and ongoing habitat conversion threatens populations in the Caymans whilst hurricane activity may also pose a threat to the species. The Swan Islands's [sic] population may have been impacted by the strong hurricane activity of 2008." It is considered common on Grand Cayman and very common on Little Cayman and Cayman Brac. It was considered common on Great Swan but as of 2020 the Swan Islands population had not been recently evaluated.
