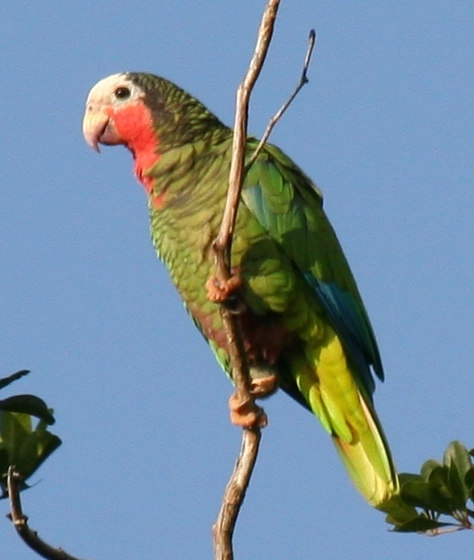
- A. l. leucocephala in Cuba

Conservation status
- Near Threatened (IUCN 3.1)
- CITES Appendix I

Scientific classification
- Kingdom: Animalia
- Phylum: Chordata
- Class: Aves
- Order: Psittaciformes
- Family: Psittacidae
- Genus: Amazona
- Species: A. leucocephala

Binomial name
- Amazona leucocephala (Linnaeus, 1758)
- Range in green

Synonyms
- Psittacus leucocephalus Linnaeus, 1758

= Cuban amazon =

Species of bird

The Cuban amazon (Amazona leucocephala), also known as the Cuban parrot and the rose-throated parrot, is a medium-sized mainly green parrot found in woodlands and dry forests of Cuba, the Bahamas and Cayman Islands in the Caribbean. Although they have been observed in the wild in Puerto Rico, they are probably the result of escaped pets, and no reproduction has been recorded.

== Taxonomy ==
The Cuban amazon was formally described in 1758 by the Swedish naturalist Carl Linnaeus in the tenth edition of his Systema Naturae. He placed it with all the other parrots in the genus Psittacus and coined the binomial name Psittacus leucocephalus. Linnaeus cited the description and illustration of the "white-headed parrot" in George Edwards' A Natural History of Uncommon Birds which was published in 1751. Linnaeus gave the type locality as "America" but this was restricted to eastern Cuba by Thomas Barbour in 1923. The Cuban amazon is now one of around thirty species placed in the genus Amazona that was introduced by the French naturalist René Lesson in 1830. The genus name is a Latinized version of the name Amazone used in the 18th century by the Comte de Buffon. The specific epithet leucocephala is from Ancient Greek leukokephalos meaning "white-headed" (from leukos meaning "white" and -kephalos meaning "-headed").

Traditionally, most authorities have recognized four subspecies of the Cuban amazon, thereby following the 1928 review by James Lee Peters.

- A. l. leucocephala (Linnaeus, 1758), also called the Cuban amazon. Present throughout Cuba, including Isla de la Juventud (formerly known as Isla de Pinos).
- A. l. bahamensis (Bryant, H, 1867), also called the Bahaman amazon. Two extant populations in the Bahamas; one on the Abaco Islands and one on Great Inagua (with sightings from nearby Little Inagua). Extirpated populations were present on the Acklins and Crooked Islands and possibly elsewhere in the Bahamas as well.
- A. l. caymanensis (Cory, 1886), also called the Grand Cayman amazon. Restricted to Grand Cayman Island.
- A. l. hesterna (Bangs, 1916). Now restricted to the island of Cayman Brac, but formerly also on Little Cayman Island.

Another subspecies, A. l. palmarum (Todd, 1916), was thought to occur in western Cuba (east to Villa Clara Province) and Isla de la Juventud based on differences in the plumage, but in 1928 a re-evaluation indicated that the colour differences were due to age-related variations and that they showed no substantial differences to the specimens obtained from the rest of Cuba (i.e., A. l. leucocephala sensu stricto). The two populations are very similar genetically, but some authorities have maintained that A. l. palmarum is a valid subspecies. A recent review based on morphology and plumage supported the distinction of A. l. palmarum (at least if restricted to the population on Isla de la Juventud), it having a longer wing chord and metatarsus, and a larger rosy pink throat patch than A. l. leucocephala of the Cuban mainland. This review also revealed differences among the populations on the various islands in the Bahamas (some of which had already been pointed out earlier), leading to the suggestion of restricting A. l. bahamensis to the now-extirpated population of the Acklins and Crooked Islands, while it was proposed that the two extant populations from the Abaco Islands and the Inagua Islands each represent a new subspecies. The recognition of three subspecies from the Bahamas is also supported by genetics.

== Description ==
The Cuban amazon is a medium-sized parrot 28–33 centimetres (11–13 in) long. It is mainly green with some blue feathers in its wings. The green feathers are edged with a terminal black rim. Its lower face, chin and throat are rosy pink, and its forehead and eye-rings are white. The extent of the various colours of the head, the extent of the rosy pink on the upper chest, and the extent of the dull red on the abdomen vary between the subspecies. Its irises are pale olive-green, its beak is horn-coloured, and the feathers over the ears are blackish. The legs are pink. The juvenile has little or no red on the abdomen, less black edging on the green feathers, and some of the feathers on the top of its head may be pale yellow rather than white.

== Distribution and habitat ==
The Cuban amazon lives in different habitats on different islands. It was once found throughout Cuba, but it is now mainly confined to the forested areas of the main island and Isla de la Juventud. There are about 10,000 individuals in Cuba, including an estimated 1,100–1,320 on Isla de la Juventud.

On the Cayman Islands the parrot lives in dry forest and on agricultural land. The population living on Grand Cayman numbers about 3,400 individuals (2006 survey), and the population on Cayman Brac consists of 400–500 individuals. The population on Little Cayman was extirpated in the 1940s.

The populations were estimated at 3,550 individuals on Abaco and 6,350 on Inagua in 2006. The populations on the Acklins and Crooked Islands were extirpated in the 1940s, while it, based on fossil remains and archaeological findings, historically also has been present on several other islands in the Bahamas (e.g., New Providence and San Salvador) and on Grand Turk Island.

== Behavior ==
In the winter Cuban amazons gather in flocks, and disperse into pairs during the breeding season.

=== Diet ===
The Cuban amazon feeds on a number of fruits and seeds including the fruits of palm trees and West Indian mahogany (Swietenia mahagoni) seeds.

=== Breeding ===
The breeding season is from March to September. Cuban amazons nest in tree cavities throughout most of its range, the only exception being that the parrots living on the Abaco Islands nest underground in limestone solution holes, where they are protected from pineyard wildfires. Two to four white eggs are laid, which are incubated by the female for 26–28 days.

== Status ==
Due to ongoing habitat loss, occasional natural disasters and trapping for the wild parrot trade, the Cuban amazon is evaluated as Near Threatened on the IUCN Red List of Threatened Species. It is protected with a listing on Appendix I of CITES, which prohibits commercial international trade of listed wild-caught species.

== Aviculture ==
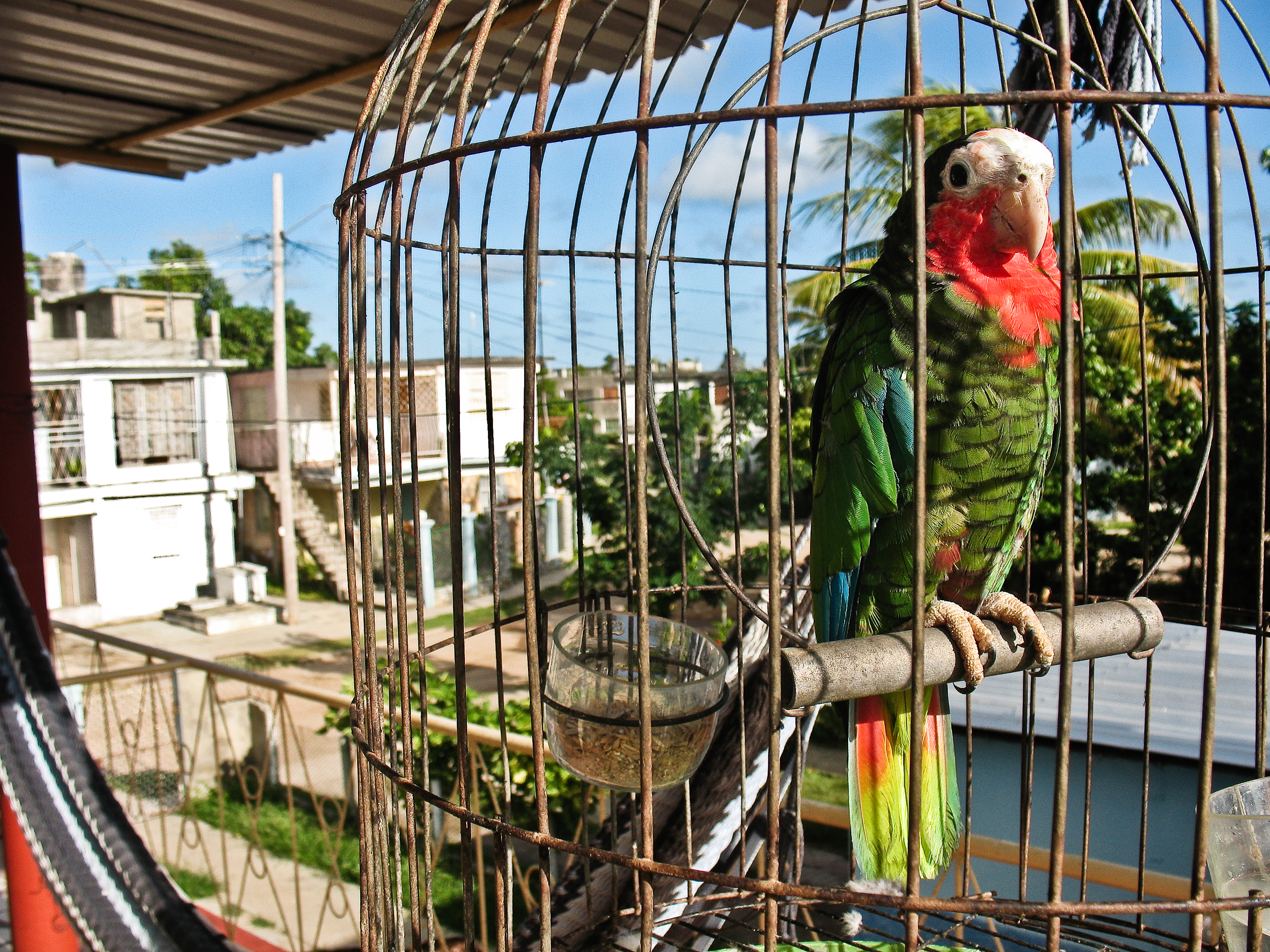
Pet in a small round cage in Cuba

The Cuban amazon was seldom-seen in aviculture outside of Cuba and Florida (where it was bred in captivity by Cuban immigrants) until the 1980s, and is considered one of the more difficult to breed amazon parrots, with aggressive behaviour from cock birds towards their mates and their own chicks a relatively common occurrence. The species is also a popular pet in Russia, as many pet parrots were brought back from Cuba by Russian soldiers following the collapse of the Soviet Union. Despite increased availability in recent times, the Cuban amazon is still one of the highest-priced of all amazons. Several colour mutations have been observed in captive-bred stock.

In the Cayman Islands, Cuban amazons (locally known as Cayman parrots) are sometimes removed from the wild and illegally kept as pets. In 2020, the authorities held an amnesty during which parrot owners could legally register their pets, which were then given health checks and fitted with microchips and leg bands in order to identify and distinguish them from wild birds. 326 parrots were registered during this amnesty.

== Gallery ==
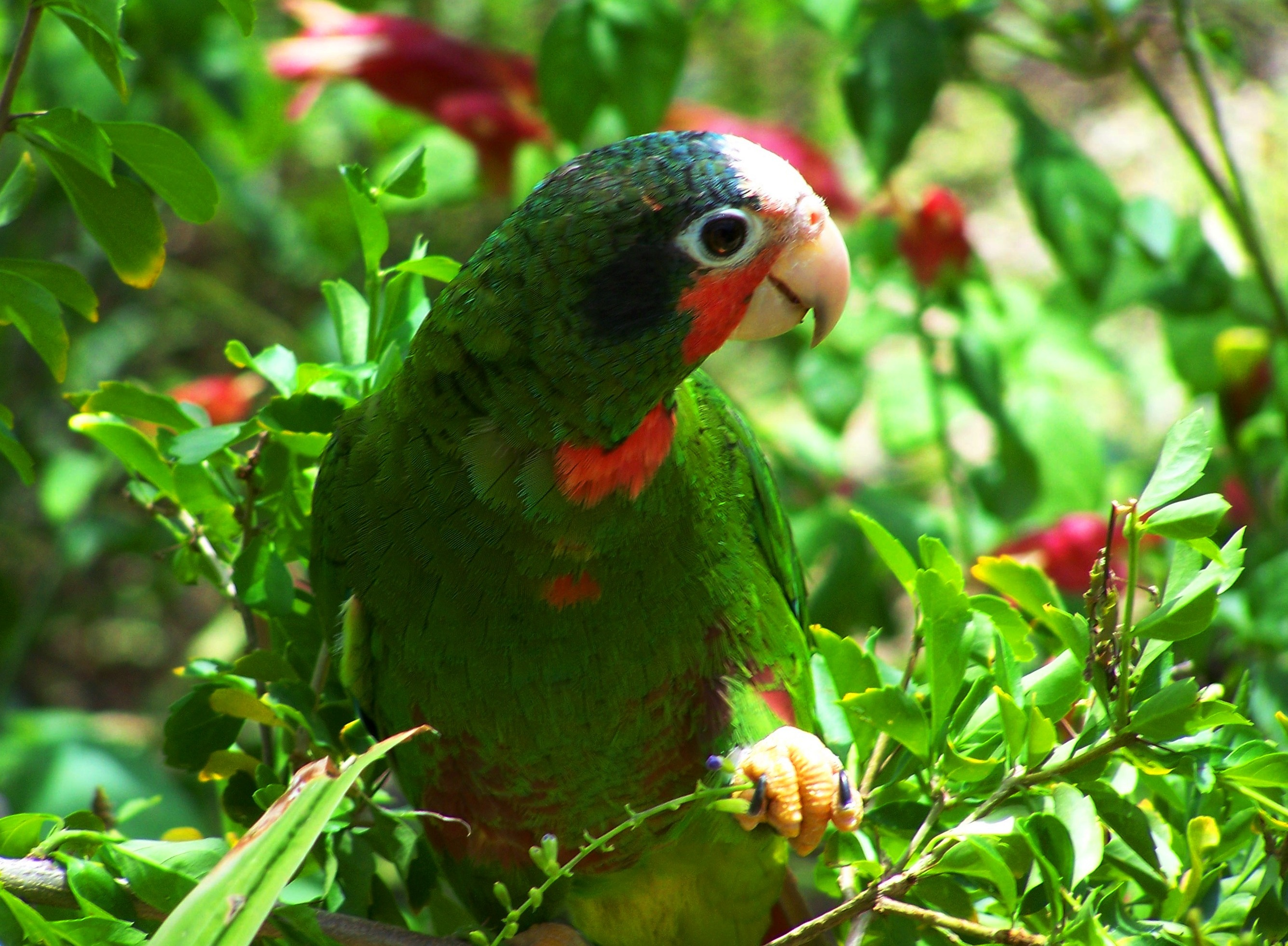
A. l. caymanensis, Grand Cayman

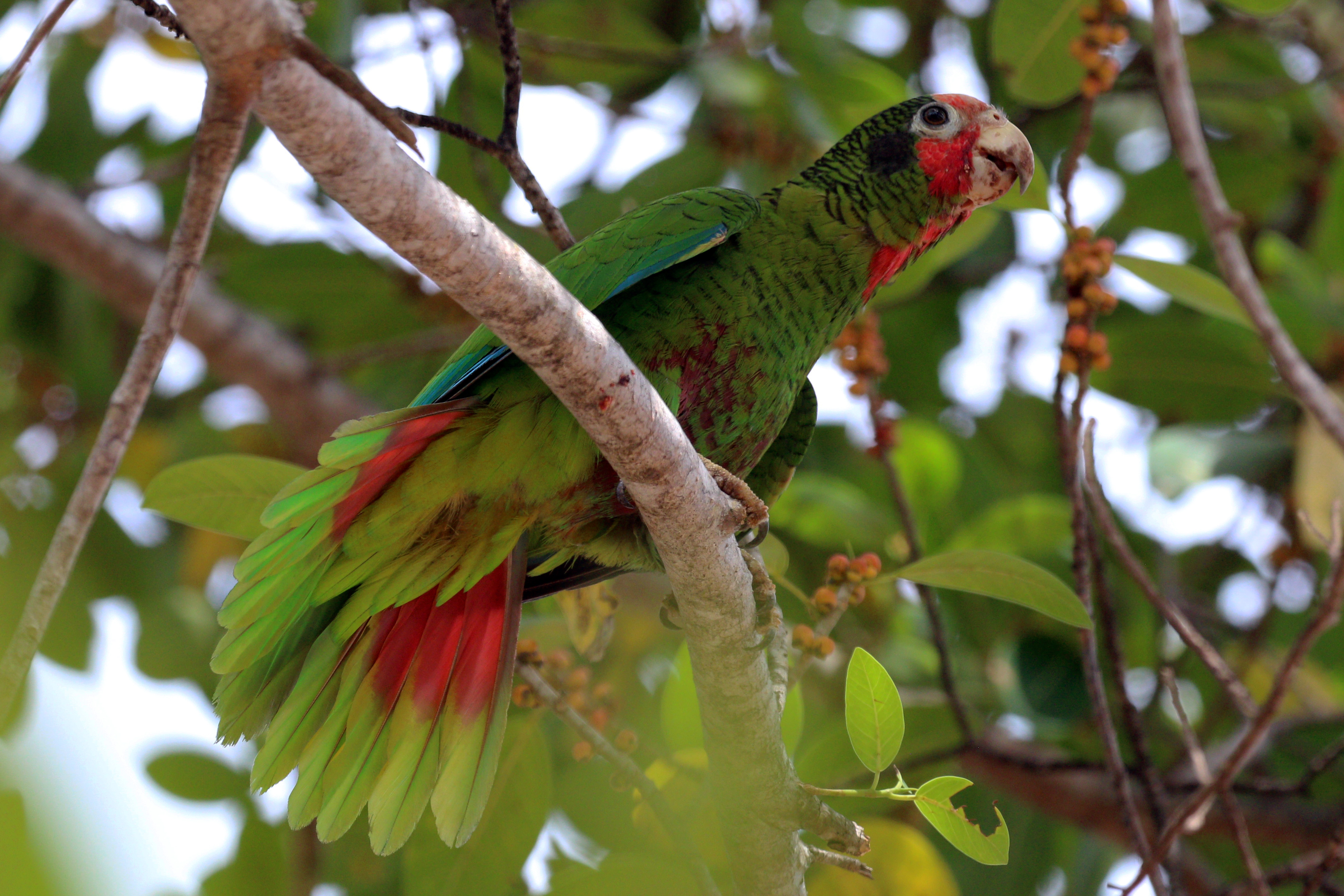
A. l. caymanensis, Grand Cayman

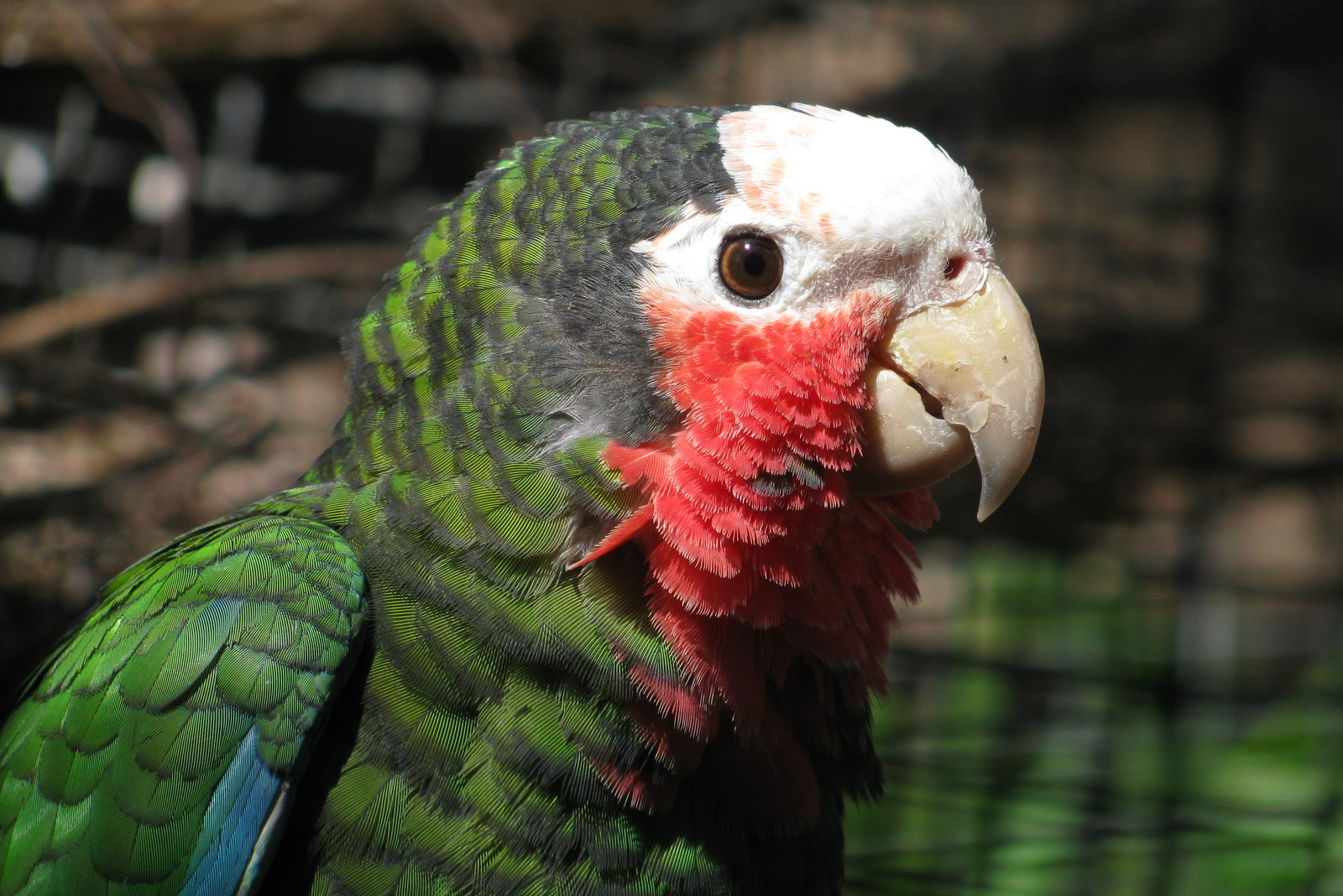
At Palmitos Park, Gran Canaria, Spain

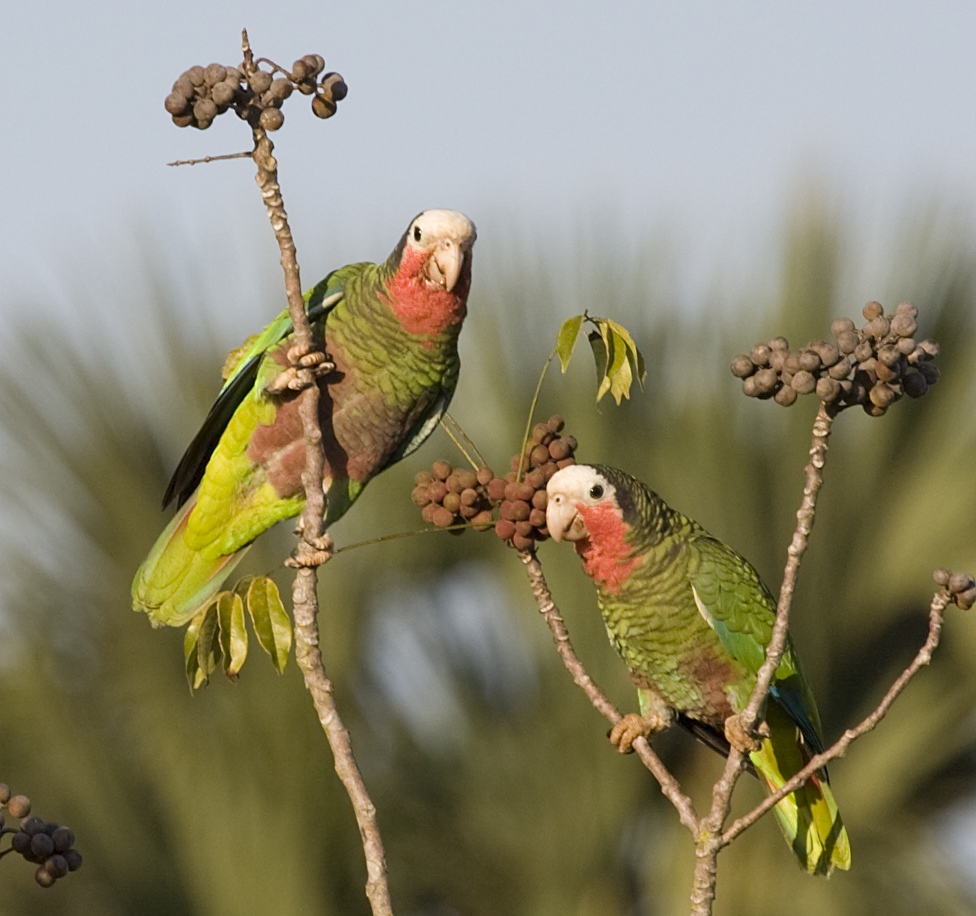
Two in a fruiting tree in Cuba
