= List of barrios and sectors of Río Grande, Puerto Rico =

Like all municipalities of Puerto Rico, Río Grande is subdivided into administrative units called barrios, which are, in contemporary times, roughly comparable to minor civil divisions. The barrios and subbarrios, in turn, are further subdivided into smaller local populated place areas/units called sectores (sectors in English). The types of sectores may vary, from normally sector to urbanización to reparto to barriada to residencial, among others.

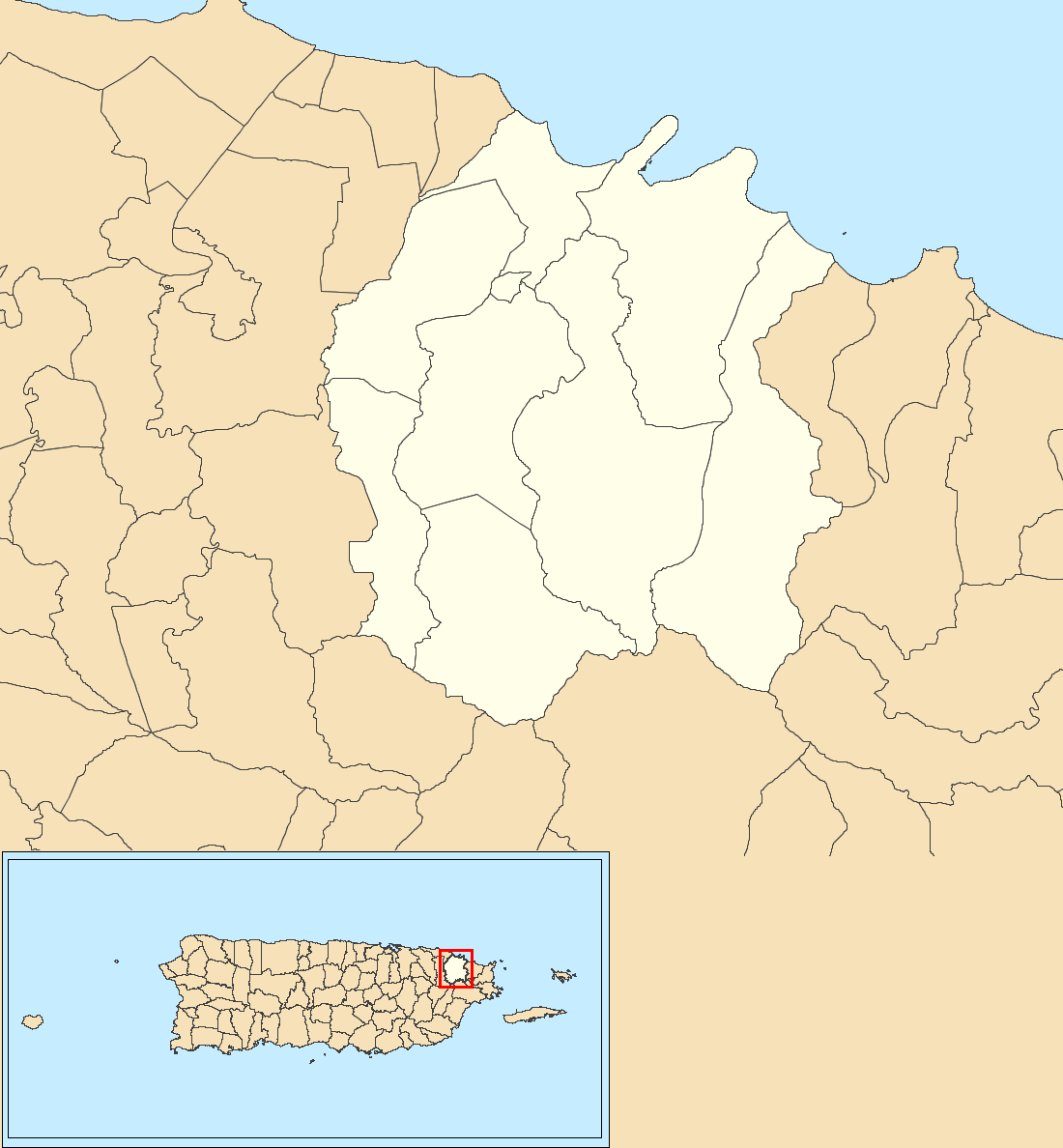
Río Grande map with barrio subdivisions

== List of sectors by barrio ==
=== Ciénaga Alta ===
- Camino Mayagüeces
- Comunidad Campo Alegre
- Parcelas Malpica
- Urbanización Luzbella

=== Ciénaga Baja ===
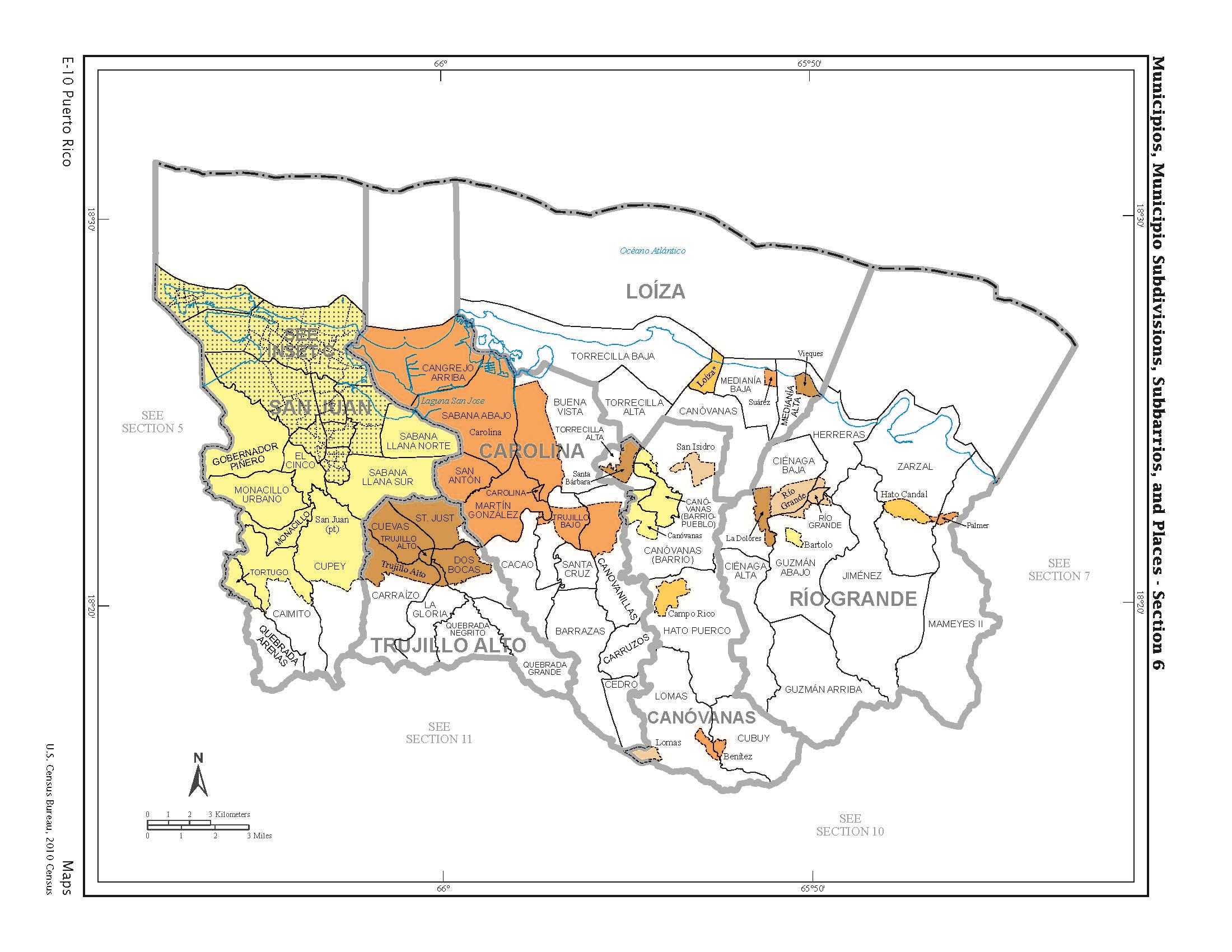
US 2010 Census map of Subdivisions, and Places of Río Grande, and some neighboring municipalities

- Apartamentos Miradores del Yunque
- Camino Los Rivera
- Carretera 959
- Comunidad Casiano Cepeda
- Condominio Portales de Río Grande
- Condominio Portales del Yunque
- Condominio Río Grande for The Elderly
- Égida Río Dorado Elderly (Sampayo Inc.)
- Extensióm Estancias del Sol
- Parcelas Estancias del Sol
- Parcelas La Ponderosa
- Parcelas Las Dolores
- Parcelas Monte Bello
- Residencal Galateo
- Río Grande Hills
- Sector El Hoyo
- Sector Las Flores Interior
- Sector Las Flores
- Sector Monte Flores
- Urbanización Alturas de Río Grande
- Urbanización Jardines de Río Grande
- Urbanización Montecillo
- Urbanización Pedregales
- Urbanización Proyecto Casa Verde
- Urbanización Proyecto Finca Galateo
- Urbanización Villas de Cambalache I y II
- Urbanización Villas de Río Grande
- Urbanización Vistas de Río Grande I y II

=== Guzmán Abajo ===
- Apartamentos Lomas de Río Grande
- Comunidad Bartolo (Sosa)
- Comunidad Medero
- Río Grande Elderly Apartments
- Sector Báez
- Sector La Vega de Guzmán
- Sector Los Quianes
- Sector Márquez
- Sector Serra
- Sector Vista Azul
- Urbanización Jardines de Villa Paola
- Urbanización Miramelinda
- Urbanización Riveras de Río Grande
- Urbanización Vistas del Mar

=== Guzmán Arriba ===
- Comunidad Piza
- Sector El Rayo
- Sector Medina
- Sector Morovis

=== Herreras ===
- Apartamentos 7000 Bahía Beach Boulevard
- Apartamentos Grand Bay
- Apartamentos Las Olas
- Apartamentos Las Ventanas
- Berwind Beach Resort
- Comunidad P. H. Hernández (Hong Kong)
- Condominio Las Verandas
- Apartments Ocean Drive Beachfront Residence
- Urbanización Las Estancias

=== Jiménez ===
- Colinas Verdes
- Comunidad Burgos
- Comunidad Los Agosto
- Comunidad Quintas del Verde
- Comunidad Villa Calzada
- Égida Hogar de Mi Mamá
- Égida Hogar Flor de la Esperanza
- Estancias del Verde
- Hacienda Jiménez
- Hacienda la Ceiba
- Hacienda Las Garzas
- Hogar Villa Paraíso
- Mansiones Hacienda Jiménez
- Parcelas Bella Vista
- Parcelas Samuel Dávila
- Rincón Perfecto
- Sector Bella Vista
- Sector Blasina
- Sector Cara del Indio
- Sector El Peñón
- Sector El Verde
- Sector Estancias del Rey
- Sector Galateo
- Sector Juan González
- Sector Muñiz y Muñiz
- Sector Rivera
- Sector Rosales
- Sector Vega Alegre
- Urbanización Brisas del Verde
- Urbanización Catalina
- Urbanización El Verde Country Club
- Urbanización Los Árboles
- Urbanización Praderas del Yunque
- Urbanización Villa del Río
- Urbanización Villas de Viczay I y II

=== Mameyes II ===
- Apartamentos Beacon Hills Terrace
- Apartamentos Río Mar
- Apartamentos Villa Las Brisas
- Área Forestal del Yunque
- Barcelona
- Condominio Ocean Sixteen
- Condominio Villas del Carmen
- Florida
- Hill Side Village
- La Vega
- Parcelas Figueroa Nuevas
- Playa del Yunque
- Río Mar Village
- Sector Palmer
- Urbanización Beacon Hills Estates
- Urbanización Colina
- Urbanización Colinas del Yunque
- Urbanización Las Vistas de Río Mar
- Urbanización Río Mar

=== Río Grande barrio-pueblo ===
- Urbanización Del Carmen
- Urbanización Los Maestros
- Urbanización Villas de Río Grande
- Urbanización y Residencial José H. Ramírez

=== Zarzal ===
- Apartamentos Bosque del Mar
- Apartamentos Costa Dorada
- Apartamentos Las Casas at Coco Beach
- Apartamentos Las Vistas de Río Mar
- Apartamentos Lindo Mar II
- Apartamentos Lindo Mar
- Apartamentos Vista de Yunque Mar
- Apartments Río Grande Estates
- Camino Guilin
- Camino Los González
- Casa del Mar Resort
- Comunidad Villas Realidad
- Continental Beach Resort
- Costa Real
- Égida Jardín del Yunque
- Hacienda Jordán
- Hogar Sánchez Cintrón del Este
- Parcelas Carola
- Parcelas Figueroa
- Sector Carola
- Sector Corea
- Sector Cuchilla
- Sector Culebro
- Sector Jericó
- Sector La Victoria
- Sector Las Coles
- Sector Las Tres T
- Sector Los Castro
- Sector Los Paganes
- Sector Los Rodríguez
- Sector Los Rosales
- Sector Mabí
- Sector Matibulen
- Sector Punta Arena
- Sector Punta Picúa
- Sector Vietnam
- Urbanización Colinas Las Tres
- Urbanización Costa del Sol
- Urbanización Estancias del Madrigal
- Urbanización Lindo Mar I
- Urbanización Mirador de Palmer
- Urbanización Río Grande Estates
- Urbanización Villa del Mar (Coco Beach)
- Urbanización Villas del Rey
- Urbanización Vistas de Río Mar
- Vereda del Mar
- Yunque del Mar Resort

== See also ==
- List of communities in Puerto Rico
