= Jiménez, Río Grande, Puerto Rico =

Barrio of Puerto Rico

Jiménez
- Barrio
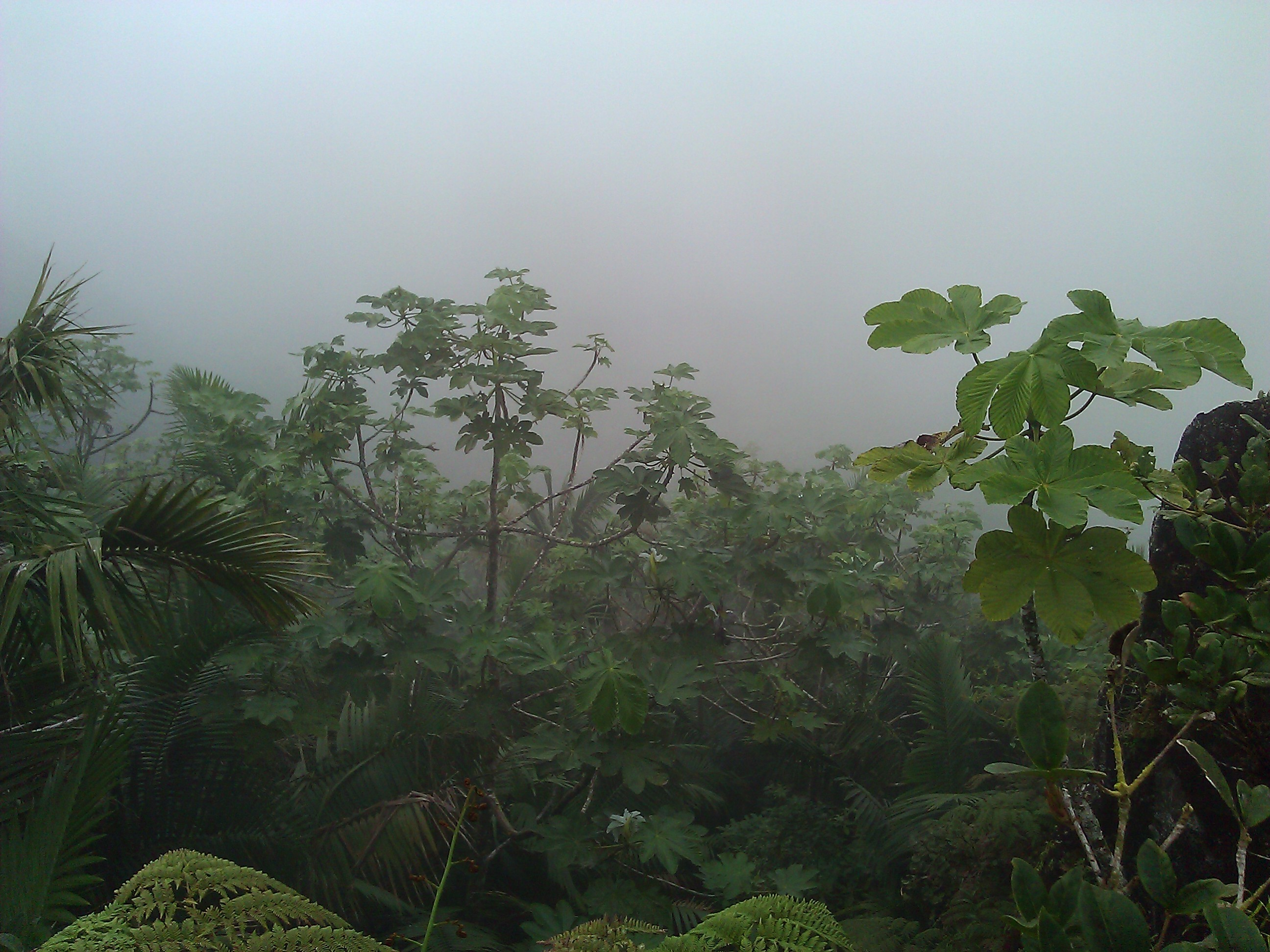
- El Yunque National Forest in Jiménez

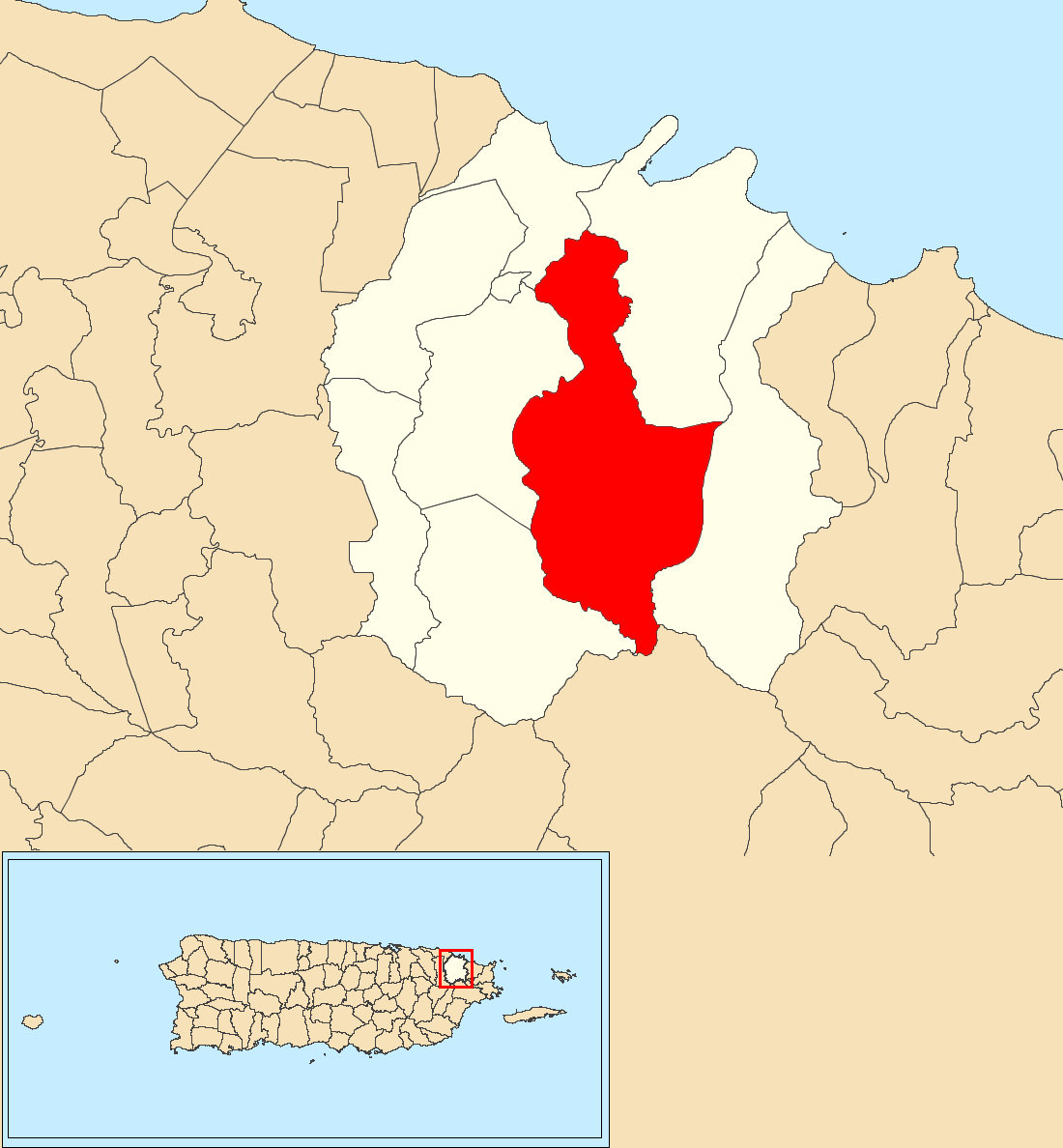
- Location of Jiménez within the municipality of Río Grande shown in red

- Location of Puerto Rico
- Coordinates: 18°19′07″N 65°48′17″W
- Commonwealth: Puerto Rico
- Municipality: Río Grande

Area
  - Total: 12.02 sq mi (31.1 km^{2})
  - Land: 12.00 sq mi (31.1 km^{2})
  - Water: 0.02 sq mi (0.052 km^{2})
- Elevation: 633 ft (193 m)

Population (2010)
  - Total: 2,925
  - Density: 243.8/sq mi (94.1/km^{2})
- Source: 2010 Census
- Time zone: UTC−4 (AST)

Jiménez is a barrio in the municipality of Río Grande, Puerto Rico. Its population in 2010 was 2,925.

== History ==
Jiménez was in Spain's gazetteers until Puerto Rico was ceded by Spain in the aftermath of the Spanish–American War under the terms of the Treaty of Paris of 1898 and became an unincorporated territory of the United States. In 1899, the United States Department of War conducted a census of Puerto Rico finding that the population of Jiménez barrio was 1,773.

Historical population
| Census | Pop. | Note | %± |
|---|---|---|---|
| 1900 | 1,773 | | — |
| 1910 | 1,974 | | 11.3% |
| 1920 | 2,143 | | 8.6% |
| 1930 | 2,265 | | 5.7% |
| 1940 | 2,486 | | 9.8% |
| 1950 | 1,946 | | −21.7% |
| 1960 | 1,366 | | −29.8% |
| 1970 | 1,875 | | 37.3% |
| 1980 | 2,169 | | 15.7% |
| 1990 | 2,467 | | 13.7% |
| 2000 | 2,903 | | 17.7% |
| 2010 | 2,925 | | 0.8% |
U.S. Decennial Census; 1899 (shown as 1900) 1910-1930; 1930-1950 1980-2000 2010

== Features ==
Río Espíritu Santo, a wild river used for recreational purposes as well is in Jiménez. It begins at El Yunque National Forest. It is a scenic river with pools, waterfalls, and rapids within extensive tropical forest.

== Sectors ==
Barrios (which are, in contemporary times, roughly comparable to minor civil divisions) in turn are further subdivided into smaller local populated place areas/units called sectores (sectors in English). The types of sectores may vary, from normally sector to urbanización to reparto to barriada to residencial, among others.

The following sectors are in Jiménez barrio:

Colinas Verdes, Comunidad Burgos, Comunidad Los Agosto, Comunidad Quintas del Verde, Comunidad Villa Calzada, Égida Hogar de Mi Mamá, Égida Hogar Flor de la Esperanza, Estancias del Verde, Hacienda Jiménez, Hacienda la Ceiba, Hacienda Las Garzas, Hogar Villa Paraíso, Mansiones Hacienda Jiménez, Parcelas Bella Vista, Parcelas Samuel Dávila, Rincón Perfecto, Sector Bella Vista, Sector Blasina, Sector Cara del Indio, Sector El Peñón, Sector El Verde, Sector Estancias del Rey, Sector Galateo, Sector Juan González, Sector Muñiz y Muñiz, Sector Rivera, Sector Rosales, Sector Vega Alegre, Urbanización Brisas del Verde, Urbanización Catalina, Urbanización El Verde Country Club, Urbanización Los Árboles, Urbanización Praderas del Yunque, Urbanización Villa del Río, and Urbanización Villas de Viczay I y II.

== Gallery ==
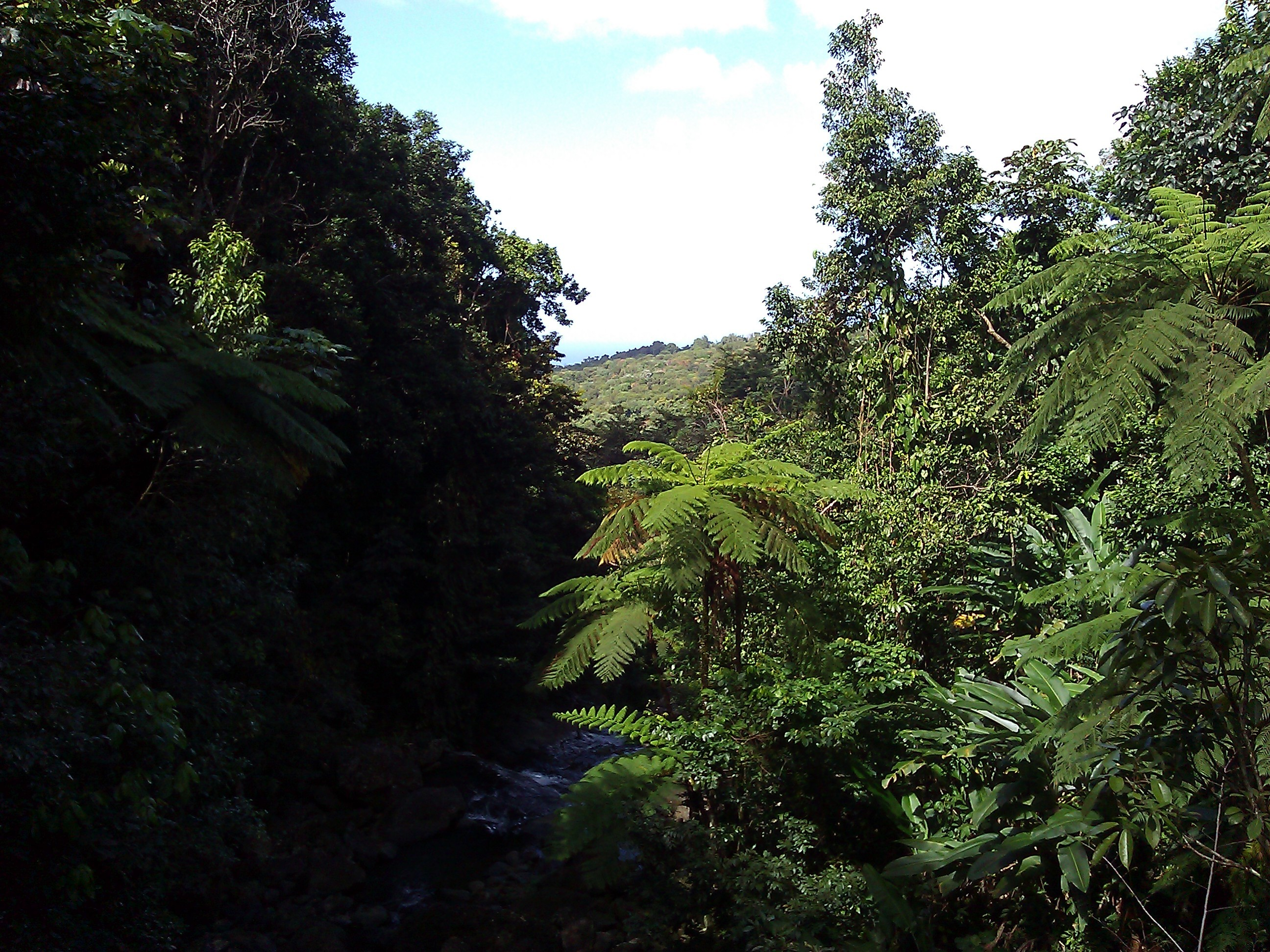
Thick vegetation in Jiménez

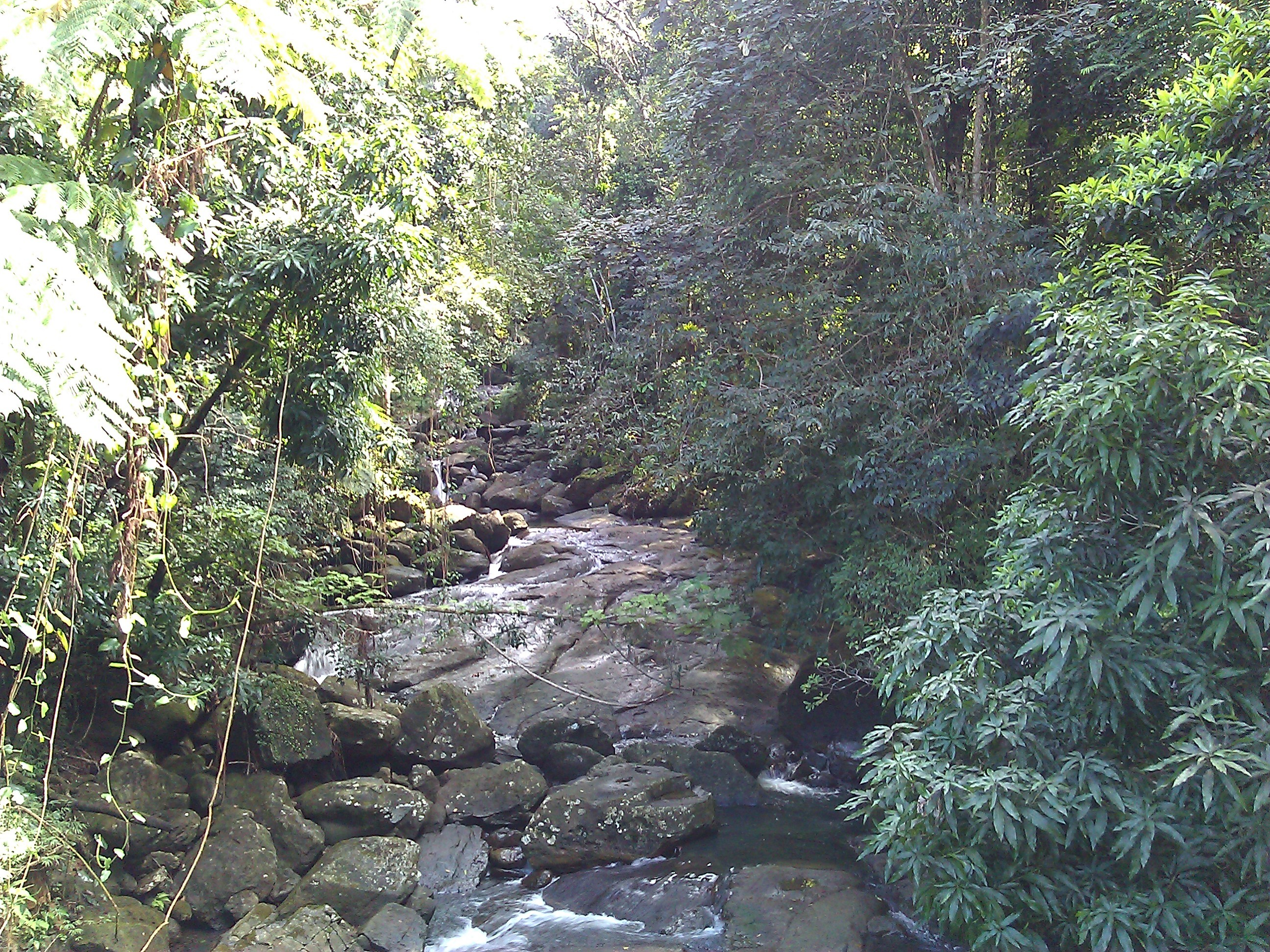
Thick vegetation in Jiménez

== See also ==
- List of communities in Puerto Rico
- List of barrios and sectors of Río Grande, Puerto Rico
