= Ciénaga Alta =

Barrio of Río Grande, Puerto Rico

- Barrio
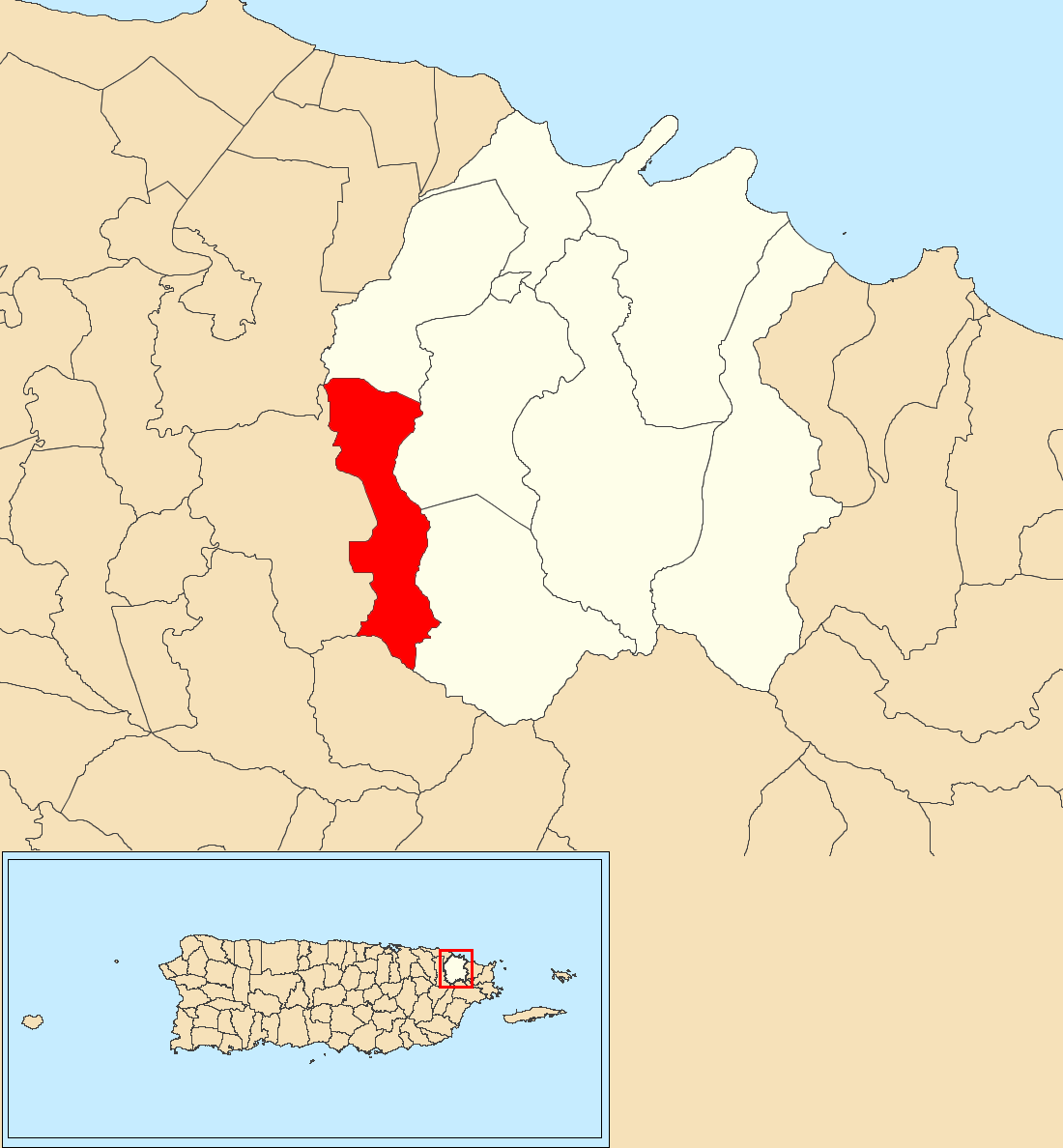
- Location of Ciénaga Alta within the municipality of Río Grande shown in red

- Location of Puerto Rico
- Coordinates: 18°19′28″N 65°51′40″W
- Commonwealth: Puerto Rico
- Municipality: Río Grande

Area
  - Total: 4.48 sq mi (11.6 km^{2})
  - Land: 4.48 sq mi (11.6 km^{2})
  - Water: 0 sq mi (0 km^{2})
- Elevation: 735 ft (224 m)

Population (2010)
  - Total: 4,911
  - Density: 1,096.2/sq mi (423.2/km^{2})
- Source: 2010 Census
- Time zone: UTC−4 (AST)

Ciénaga Alta is a barrio in the municipality of Río Grande, Puerto Rico. Its population in 2010 was 4,911.

== History ==
Ciénaga Alta was in Spain's gazetteers until Puerto Rico was ceded by Spain in the aftermath of the Spanish–American War under the terms of the Treaty of Paris of 1898 and became an unincorporated territory of the United States. In 1899, the United States Department of War conducted a census of Puerto Rico finding that the population of Ciénaga barrio (which are Ciénaga Baja and Ciénaga Alta) was 1,610.

Historical population
Census	Pop.	Note	%±
1910	679		—
1920	791		16.5%
1930	751		−5.1%
1940	873		16.2%
1950	1,308		49.8%
1960	1,965		50.2%
1970	2,525		28.5%
1980	3,001		18.9%
1990	3,768		25.6%
2000	4,606		22.2%
2010	4,911		6.6%
U.S. Decennial Census; 1899 (shown as 1900) 1910-1930; 1930-1950 1980-2000 2010

== Sectors ==
Barrios (which are, in contemporary times, roughly comparable to minor civil divisions) in turn are further subdivided into smaller local populated place areas/units called sectores (sectors in English). The types of sectores may vary, from normally sector to urbanización to reparto to barriada to residencial, among others.

The following sectors are in Ciénaga Alta barrio:

Camino Mayagüeces, Comunidad Campo Alegre, Parcelas Malpica, and Urbanización Luzbella.

== Features ==
Lilium, a small fragrant flower, has been cultivated in Ciénaga Alta for generations.

The Nathaniel (Taín) Ramos González mini-stadium is a small baseball stadium located in Ciénaga Alta.

== See also ==
- List of communities in Puerto Rico
- List of barrios and sectors of Río Grande, Puerto Rico
