= Herreras =

Barrio of Río Grande, Puerto Rico

- Barrio
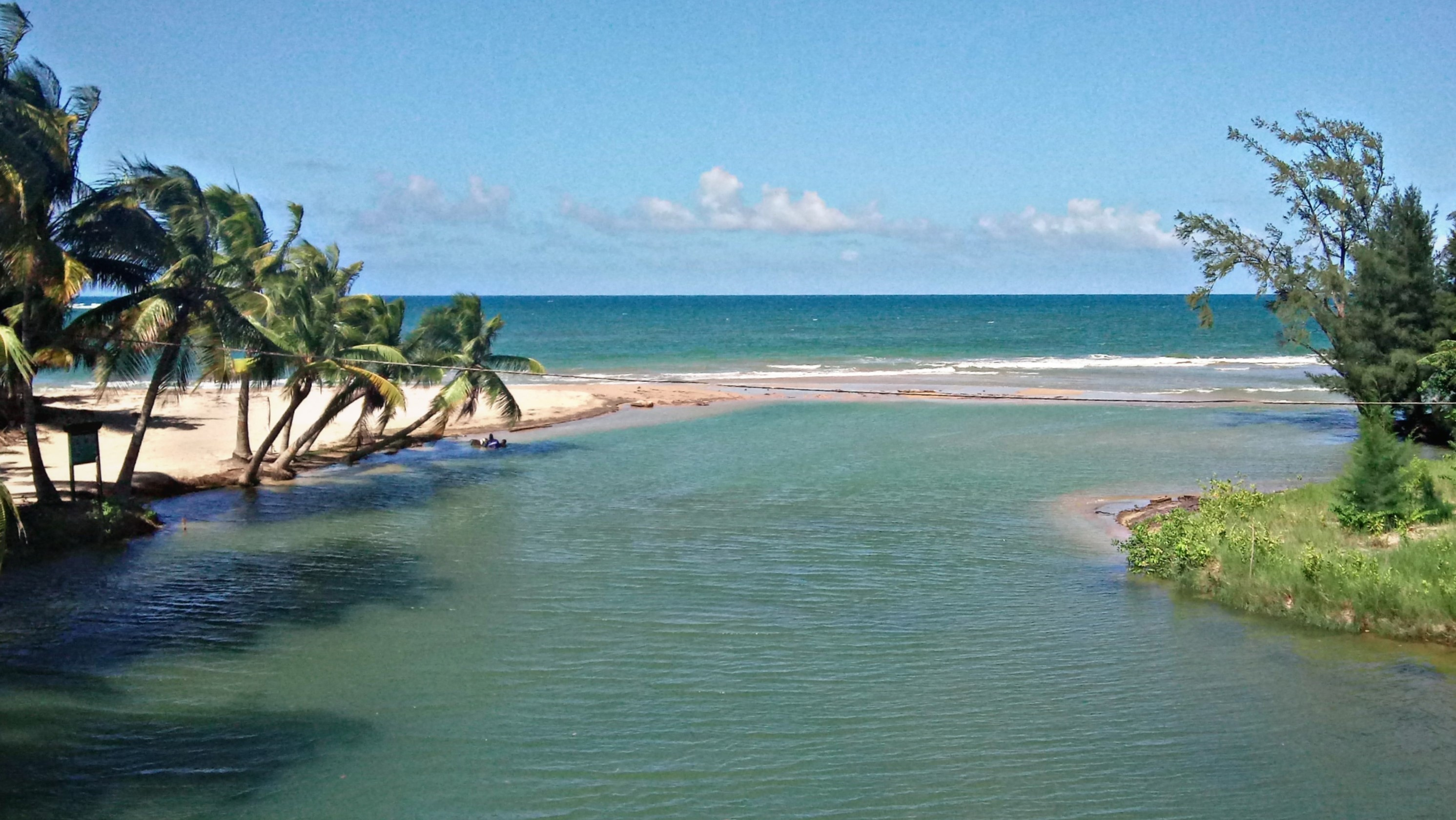
- River mouth in Herreras

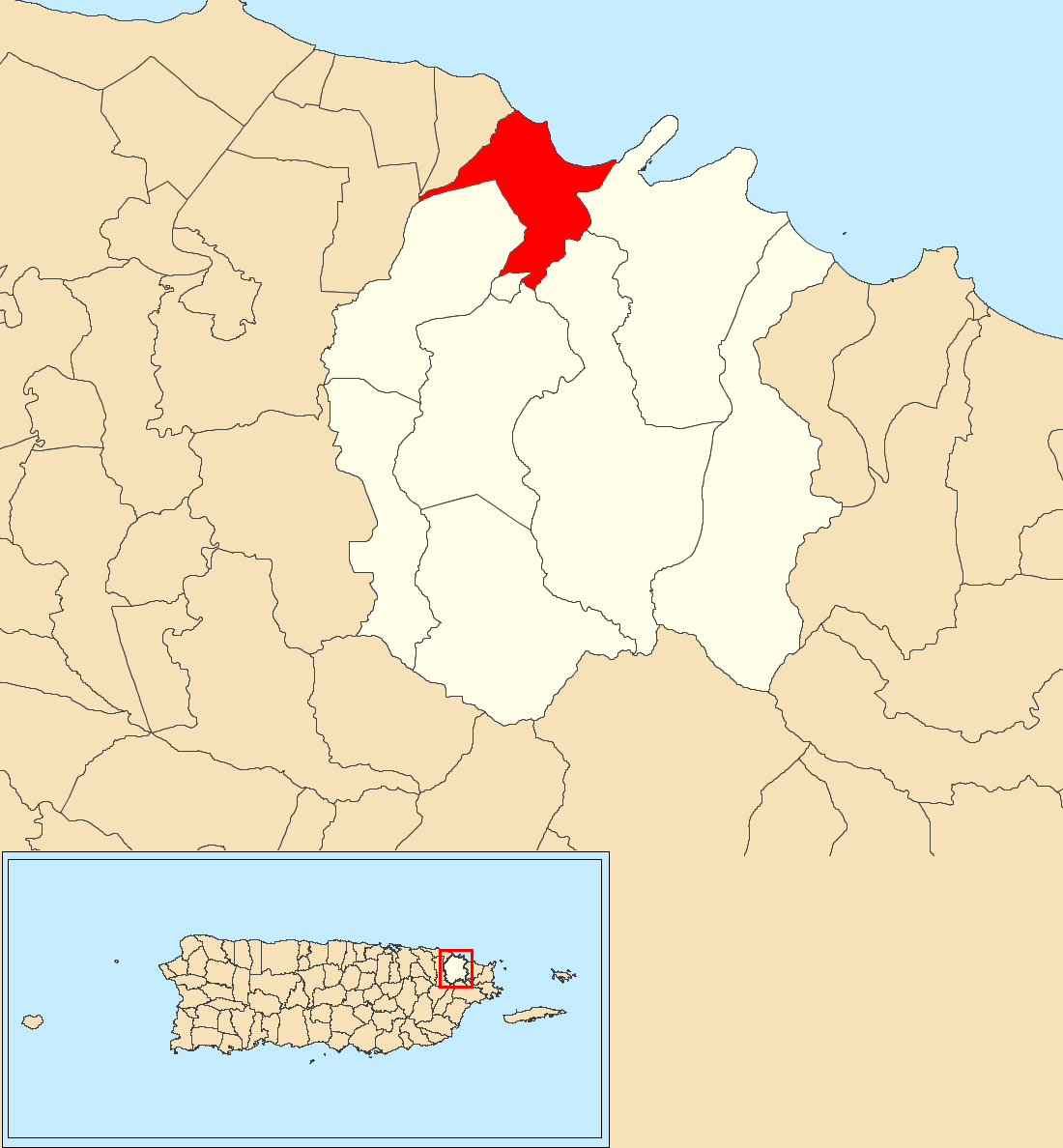
- Location of Herreras within the municipality of Río Grande shown in red

- Location of Puerto Rico
- Coordinates: 18°23′59″N 65°49′08″W
- Commonwealth: Puerto Rico
- Municipality: Río Grande

Area
  - Total: 3.74 sq mi (9.7 km^{2})
  - Land: 3.22 sq mi (8.3 km^{2})
  - Water: 0.52 sq mi (1.3 km^{2})
- Elevation: 0 ft (0 m)

Population (2010)
  - Total: 782
  - Density: 242.9/sq mi (93.8/km^{2})
- Source: 2010 Census
- Time zone: UTC−4 (AST)

Herreras is a barrio in the municipality of Río Grande, Puerto Rico. Its population in 2010 was 782.

== History ==
Herreras was in Spain's gazetteers until Puerto Rico was ceded by Spain in the aftermath of the Spanish–American War under the terms of the Treaty of Paris of 1898 and became an unincorporated territory of the United States. In 1899, the United States Department of War conducted a census of Puerto Rico finding that the population of Herreras barrio was 221.

Historical population
Census	Pop.	Note	%±
1900	221		—
1910	217		−1.8%
1920	281		29.5%
1930	330		17.4%
1940	267		−19.1%
1950	171		−36.0%
1960	188		9.9%
1970	0		−100.0%
1980	919		—
1990	928		1.0%
2000	839		−9.6%
2010	782		−6.8%
U.S. Decennial Census; 1899 (shown as 1900) 1910-1930; 1930-1950 1980-2000 2010

== Sectors ==
Barrios (which are, in contemporary times, roughly comparable to minor civil divisions) in turn are further subdivided into smaller local populated place areas/units called sectores (sectors in English). The types of sectores may vary, from normally sector to urbanización to reparto to barriada to residencial, among others.

The following sectors are in Herreras barrio:

Apartamentos 7000 Bahía Beach Boulevard, Apartamentos Grand Bay, Apartamentos Las Olas, Apartamentos Las Ventanas, Berwind Beach Resort, Comunidad P. H. Hernández (Hong Kong), Condominio Las Verandas, Apartments Ocean Drive Beachfront Residence, and Urbanización Las Estancias.

In Herreras is part of the Río Grande urban zone.

== See also ==
- List of communities in Puerto Rico
- List of barrios and sectors of Río Grande, Puerto Rico
