= Antonio Bachour =

American pastry chef

- Born: Rio Grande, Puerto Rico (1975)
- Education: Johnson & Wales University, Valrhona cooking school
- Occupation: Pastry Chef

Antonio Bachour (1975 in Rio Grande, Puerto Rico) is a Puerto Rican pastry chef. In 2011, he was named one of the ten best pastry chefs in America, and subsequently won the 2012 Zest Award for Baking & Pastry Innovator after having been nominated for the 2011 award. Zagat has described him as a "confection master".

== Life and education ==
Bachour is a graduate of Johnson & Wales University, and has studied at the Valrhona cooking school.

== Career ==
Bachour has served as a judge in the 2013 US Pastry Competition and the Chicago Restaurant Pastry Competition, and as a guest chef at the 2013 Friends of James Beard dinner, held by the James Beard Foundation.

In 2013, he published his first cookbook.

== Accolades ==
- 2012, Zest award for The Baking & Pastry Innovator by Johnson and Wales University
- 2018, Best Pastry Chef Award by the Best Chefs Awards Organization, the world’s leading culinary award platform
- 2019, Esquire Magazine Pastry chef of the year
