= Zarzal, Río Grande, Puerto Rico =

Barrio of Puerto Rico

Zarzal
- Barrio
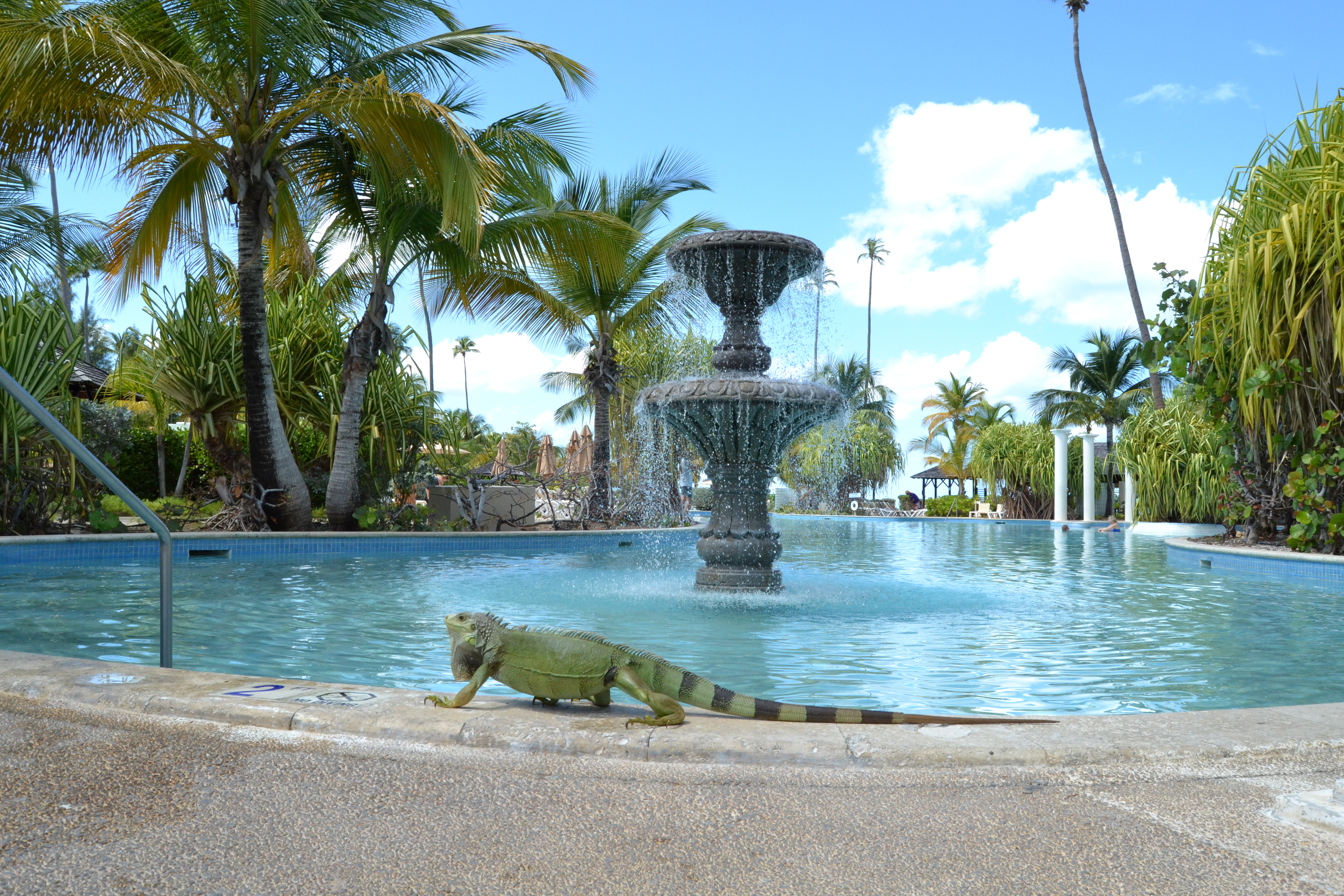
- Large iguana on fountain ledge in Zarzal

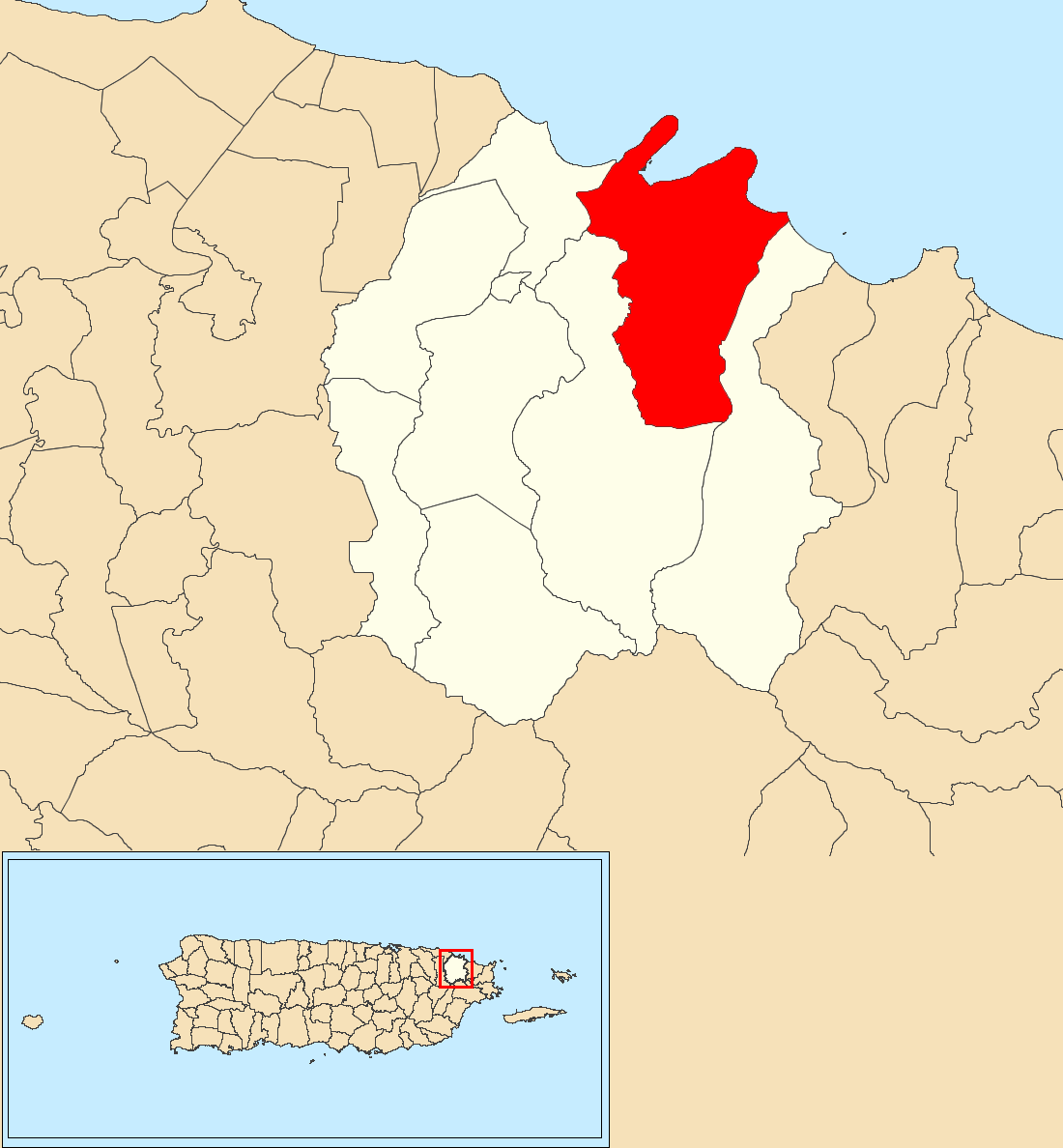
- Location of Zarzal within the municipality of Río Grande shown in red

- Location of Puerto Rico
- Coordinates: 18°23′07″N 65°47′14″W
- Commonwealth: Puerto Rico
- Municipality: Río Grande

Area
  - Total: 10.87 sq mi (28.2 km^{2})
  - Land: 9.27 sq mi (24.0 km^{2})
  - Water: 1.60 sq mi (4.1 km^{2})
- Elevation: 52 ft (16 m)

Population (2010)
  - Total: 14,314
  - Density: 1,545.8/sq mi (596.8/km^{2})
- Source: 2010 Census
- Time zone: UTC−4 (AST)

Zarzal is a barrio in the municipality of Río Grande, Puerto Rico. Its population in 2010 was 14,314.

== History ==
Zarzal was in Spain's gazetteers until Puerto Rico was ceded by Spain in the aftermath of the Spanish–American War under the terms of the Treaty of Paris of 1898 and became an unincorporated territory of the United States. In 1899, the United States Department of War conducted a census of Puerto Rico finding that the population of Zarzal barrio was 1,191.

Historical population
Census	Pop.	Note	%±
1900	1,191		—
1910	1,204		1.1%
1920	1,664		38.2%
1930	1,599		−3.9%
1940	2,475		54.8%
1950	2,647		6.9%
1960	2,768		4.6%
1970	3,720		34.4%
1980	5,148		38.4%
1990	8,714		69.3%
2000	13,385		53.6%
2010	14,314		6.9%
U.S. Decennial Census; 1899 (shown as 1900) 1910-1930; 1930-1950 1980-2000 2010

== Features ==
There is a correctional facility in Zarzal.

== Sectors ==
Barrios (which are, in contemporary times, roughly comparable to minor civil divisions) in turn are further subdivided into smaller local populated place areas/units called sectores (sectors in English). The types of sectores may vary, from normally sector to urbanización to reparto to barriada to residencial, among others.

The following sectors are in Zarzal barrio:

Apartamentos Bosque del Mar, Apartamentos Costa Dorada, Apartamentos Las Casas at Coco Beach, Apartamentos Las Vistas de Río Mar, Apartamentos Lindo Mar II, Apartamentos Lindo Mar, Apartamentos Vista de Yunque Mar, Apartments Río Grande Estates, Camino Guilin, Camino Los González, Casa del Mar Resort, Comunidad Villas Realidad, Continental Beach Resort, Costa Real, Égida Jardín del Yunque, Hacienda Jordán, Hogar Sánchez Cintrón del Este Parcelas Carola, Sector Carola, Sector Corea, Urbanización Costa del Sol, Sector Cuchilla, Sector Culebro, Sector Jericó, Sector La Victoria, Sector Las Coles, Parcelas Figueroa, Sector Las Tres T (Parte al Este de la Quebrada Juan González), Sector Las Tres T (Parte al Oeste de la Quebrada Juan González), Sector Los Castro, Sector Los Paganes, Sector Los Rodríguez, Sector Los Rosales, Sector Mabí, Sector Matibulen, Sector Punta Arena, Sector Punta Picúa, Sector Vietnam, Urbanización Colinas Las Tres, Urbanización Estancias del Madrigal, Urbanización Lindo Mar I, Urbanización Mirador de Palmer, Urbanización Río Grande Estates, Urbanización Río Grande Estates, Urbanización Villa del Mar (Coco Beach), Urbanización Villas del Rey, Urbanización Vistas de Río Mar, Vereda del Mar, and Yunque del Mar Resort.

In Zarzal is the Hato Candal comunidad and part of the Palmer comunidad.

== Gallery ==
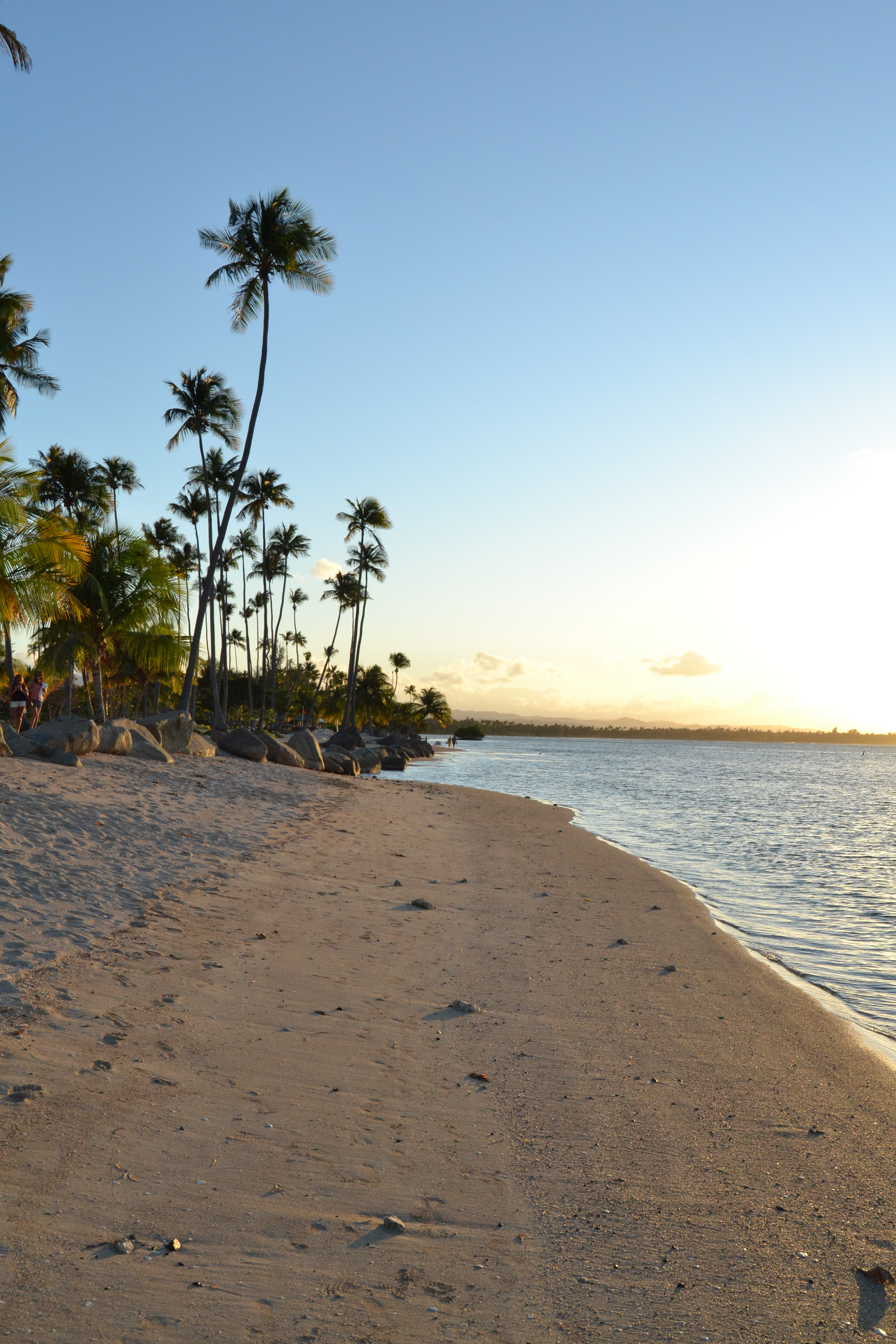
Beach in Zarzal

== See also ==
- List of communities in Puerto Rico
- List of barrios and sectors of Río Grande, Puerto Rico
