= Ciénaga Baja =

Barrio of Río Grande, Puerto Rico

- Barrio
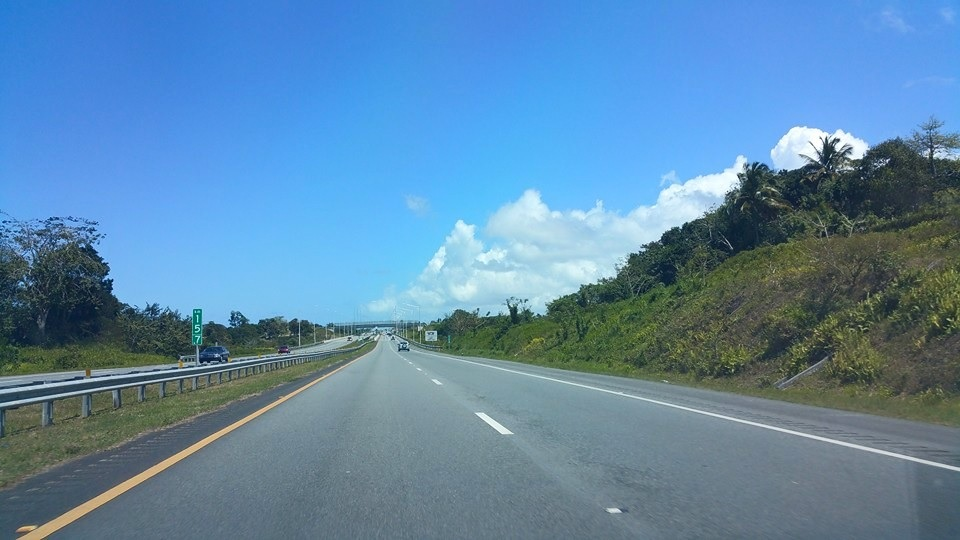
- Puerto Rico Highway 66 in Ciénaga Baja

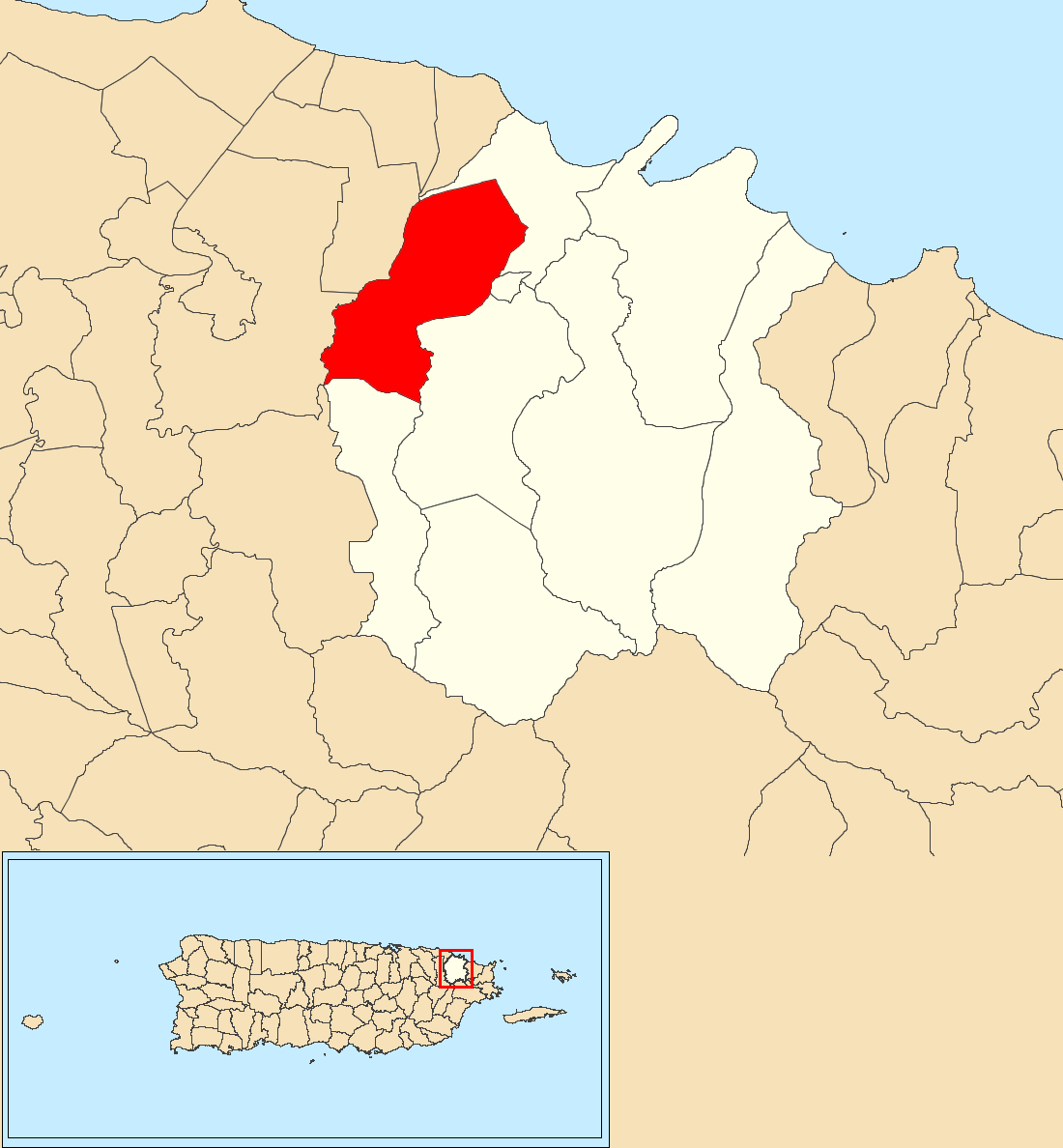
- Location of Ciénaga Baja within the municipality of Río Grande shown in red

- Location of Puerto Rico
- Coordinates: 18°22′47″N 65°51′04″W
- Commonwealth: Puerto Rico
- Municipality: Río Grande

Area
  - Total: 5.87 sq mi (15.2 km^{2})
  - Land: 5.87 sq mi (15.2 km^{2})
  - Water: 0 sq mi (0 km^{2})
- Elevation: 23 ft (7.0 m)

Population (2010)
  - Total: 18,385
  - Density: 3,132/sq mi (1,209/km^{2})
- Source: 2010 Census
- Time zone: UTC−4 (AST)

Ciénaga Baja is a barrio in the municipality of Río Grande, Puerto Rico. Its population in 2010 was 18,385.

== History ==
Ciénaga Baja was in Spain's gazetteers until Puerto Rico was ceded by Spain in the aftermath of the Spanish–American War under the terms of the Treaty of Paris of 1898 and became an unincorporated territory of the United States. In 1899, the United States Department of War conducted a census of Puerto Rico finding that the population of Ciénaga barrio (which are Ciénaga Bajo and Ciénaga Alta) was 1,610.

As far as Río Grande is from the epicenter of the 6.3 earthquake that struck Puerto Rico on January 7, some residents in Ciénaga Baja stated they felt the earthquake and stated they lost electrical power in their homes.

Historical population
Census	Pop.	Note	%±
1910	1,047		—
1920	1,205		15.1%
1930	1,728		43.4%
1940	1,867		8.0%
1950	2,404		28.8%
1960	3,443		43.2%
1970	0		−100.0%
1980	13,946		—
1990	17,805		27.7%
2000	18,220		2.3%
2010	18,385		0.9%
U.S. Decennial Census; 1899 (shown as 1900) 1910-1930; 1930-1950 1980-2000 2010

== Sectors ==
Barrios (which are, in contemporary times, roughly comparable to minor civil divisions) in turn are further subdivided into smaller local populated place areas/units called sectores (sectors in English). The types of sectores may vary, from normally sector to urbanización to reparto to barriada to residencial, among others.

The following sectors are in Ciénaga Baja barrio:

Apartamentos Miradores del Yunque, Camino Los Rivera, Carretera 959, Comunidad Casiano Cepeda, Condominio Portales de Río Grande, Condominio Portales del Yunque, Condominio Río Grande for The Elderly, Égida Río Dorado Elderly (Sampayo Inc.), Extensión Estancias del Sol, Parcelas Estancias del Sol, Parcelas La Ponderosa, Parcelas Las Dolores, Parcelas Monte Bello, Residencial Galateo, Sector Las Flores Interior, Río Grande Hills, Sector El Hoyo, Sector Las Flores, Sector Monte Flores, Urbanización Alturas de Río Grande, Urbanización Jardines de Río Grande, Urbanización Montecillo, Urbanización Pedregales, Urbanización Proyecto Casa Verde, Urbanización Proyecto Finca Galateo, Urbanización Villas de Cambalache I y II, Urbanización Villas de Río Grande, and Urbanización Vistas de Río Grande I y II.

In Ciénaga Baja is the La Dolores comunidad, and part of the Río Grande urban area.

== See also ==
- List of communities in Puerto Rico
- List of barrios and sectors of Río Grande, Puerto Rico
