= Río Grande barrio-pueblo =

Historical and administrative center (seat) of Río Grande, Puerto Rico

Río Grande barrio-pueblo Pueblo de Río Grande
- Municipality seat
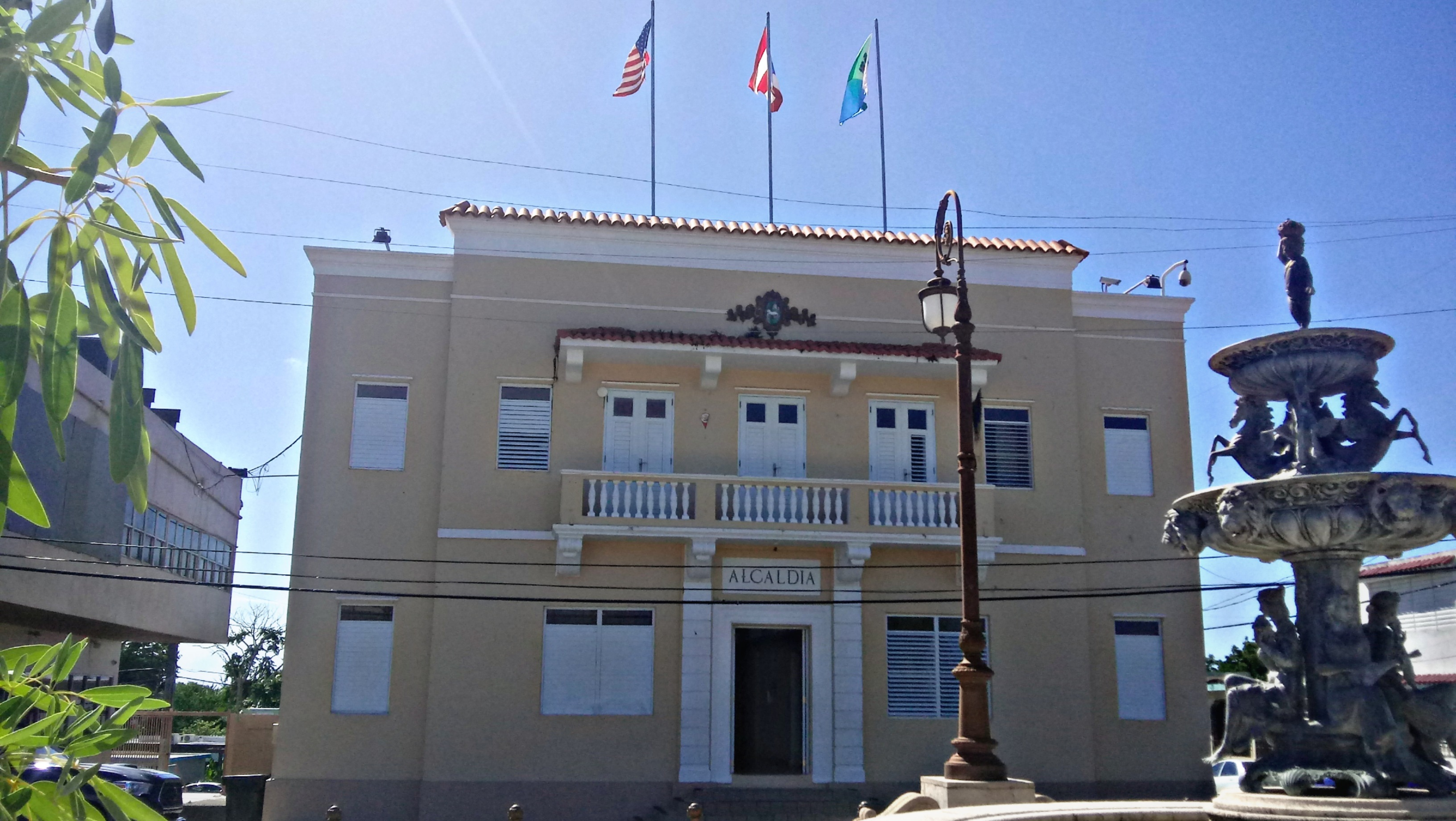
- City Hall of Río Grande

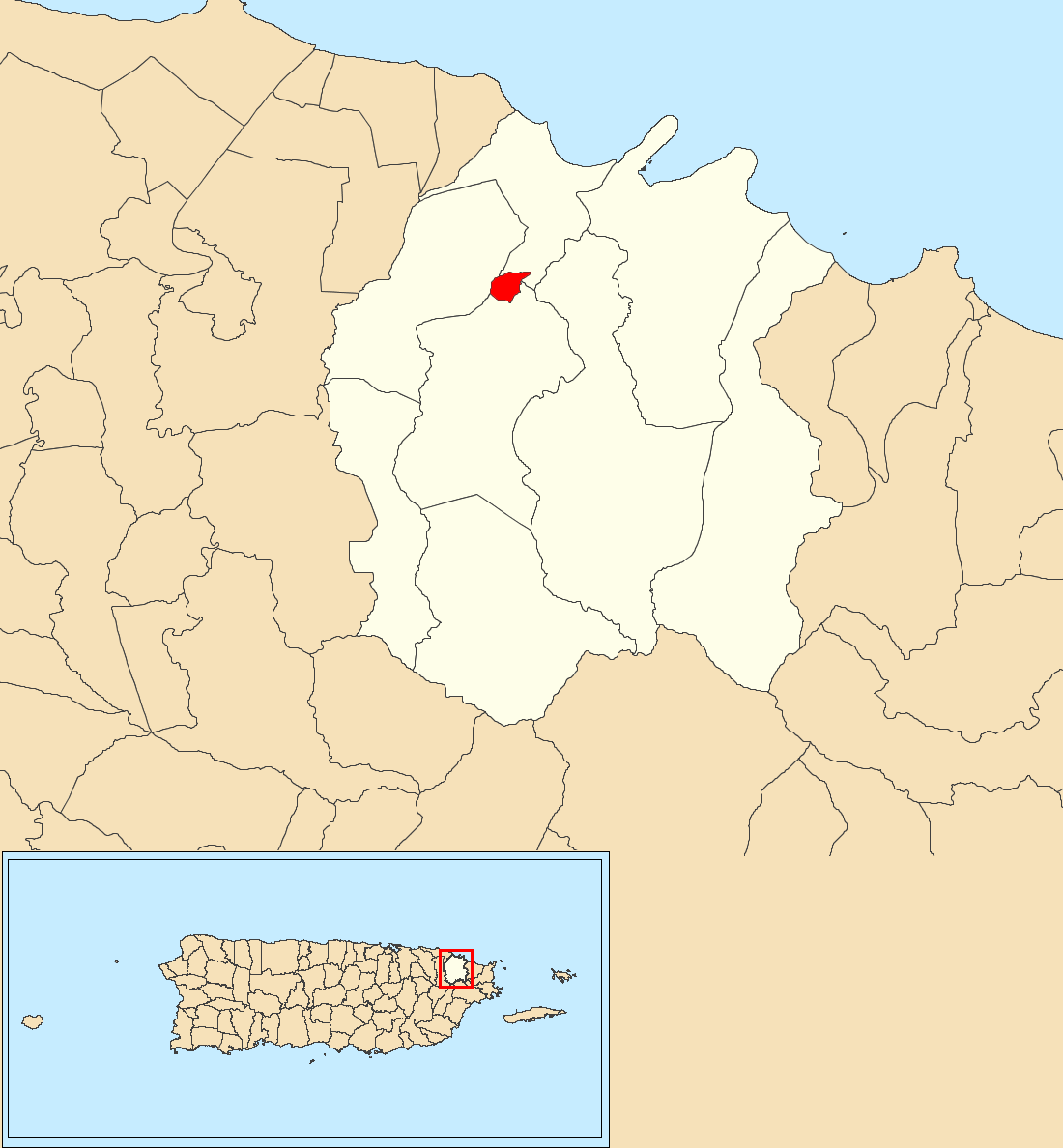
- Location of Río Grande barrio-pueblo within the municipality of Río Grande shown in red

- Location of Puerto Rico
- Coordinates: 18°22′48″N 65°49′51″W
- Commonwealth: Puerto Rico
- Municipality: Río Grande

Area
  - Total: 0.2 sq mi (0.52 km^{2})
  - Land: 0.2 sq mi (0.52 km^{2})
  - Water: 0 sq mi (0 km^{2})
- Elevation: 33 ft (10 m)

Population (2010)
  - Total: 1,772
  - Density: 8,860/sq mi (3,420/km^{2})
- Source: 2010 Census
- Time zone: UTC−4 (AST)

Río Grande barrio-pueblo is a barrio and the administrative center (seat) of Río Grande, a municipality of Puerto Rico. Its population in 2010 was 1,772.

As was customary in Spain, in Puerto Rico, the municipality has a barrio called pueblo which contains a central plaza, the municipal buildings (city hall), and a Catholic church. Fiestas patronales (patron saint festivals) are held in the central plaza every year.

== The central plaza and its church ==
The central plaza, or square, is a place for official and unofficial recreational events and a place where people can gather and socialize from dusk to dawn. The Laws of the Indies, Spanish law, which regulated life in Puerto Rico in the early 19th century, stated the plaza's purpose was for "the parties" (celebrations, festivities) (Spanish: a propósito para las fiestas), and that the square should be proportionally large enough for the number of neighbors (Spanish: grandeza proporcionada al número de vecinos). These Spanish regulations also stated that the streets nearby should be comfortable portals for passersby, protecting them from the elements: sun and rain.

Located across the central plaza in Río Grande barrio-pueblo is the Parroquia Nuestra Señora del Carmen, a Roman Catholic church.

== History ==
Río Grande barrio-pueblo was in Spain's gazetteers until Puerto Rico was ceded by Spain in the aftermath of the Spanish–American War under the terms of the Treaty of Paris of 1898 and became an unincorporated territory of the United States. In 1899, the United States Department of War conducted a census of Puerto Rico finding that the population of Río Grande barrio-pueblo was 1,285. At the time, it was called Pueblo.

Historical population
| Census | Pop. | Note | %± |
|---|---|---|---|
| 1900 | 1,285 | | — |
| 1910 | 1,843 | | 43.4% |
| 1920 | 1,962 | | 6.5% |
| 1930 | 2,127 | | 8.4% |
| 1940 | 2,408 | | 13.2% |
| 1950 | 2,623 | | 8.9% |
| 1960 | 2,763 | | 5.3% |
| 1970 | 0 | | −100.0% |
| 1980 | 3,058 | | — |
| 1990 | 2,273 | | −25.7% |
| 2000 | 1,948 | | −14.3% |
| 2010 | 1,772 | | −9.0% |
U.S. Decennial Census; 1899 (shown as 1900) 1910-1930; 1930-1950 1980-2000 2010

== Sectors ==
Barrios (which are, in contemporary times, roughly comparable to minor civil divisions) in turn are further subdivided into smaller local populated place areas/units called sectores (sectors in English). The types of sectores may vary, from normally sector to urbanización to reparto to barriada to residencial, among others.

The following sectors are in Río Grande barrio-pueblo:

Urbanización Del Carmen, Urbanización Los Maestros, Urbanización Villas de Río Grande, and Urbanización y Residencial José H. Ramírez.

In Río Grande barrio-pueblo is part of the Río Grande urban zone.

== Gallery ==
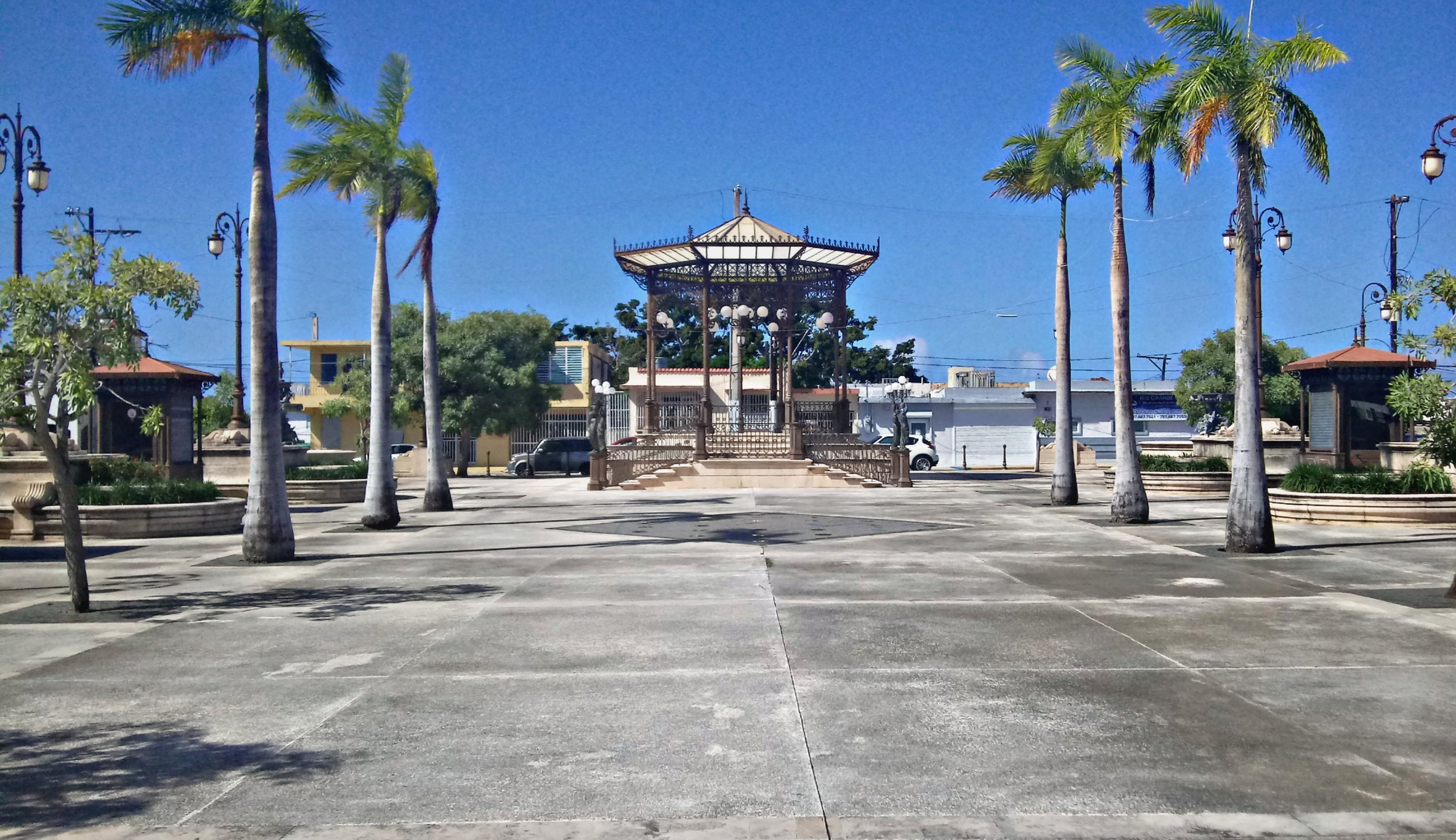
The central plaza

== See also ==
- List of communities in Puerto Rico
- List of barrios and sectors of Río Grande, Puerto Rico
