= Guzmán Arriba =

Barrio of Río Grande, Puerto Rico

- Barrio
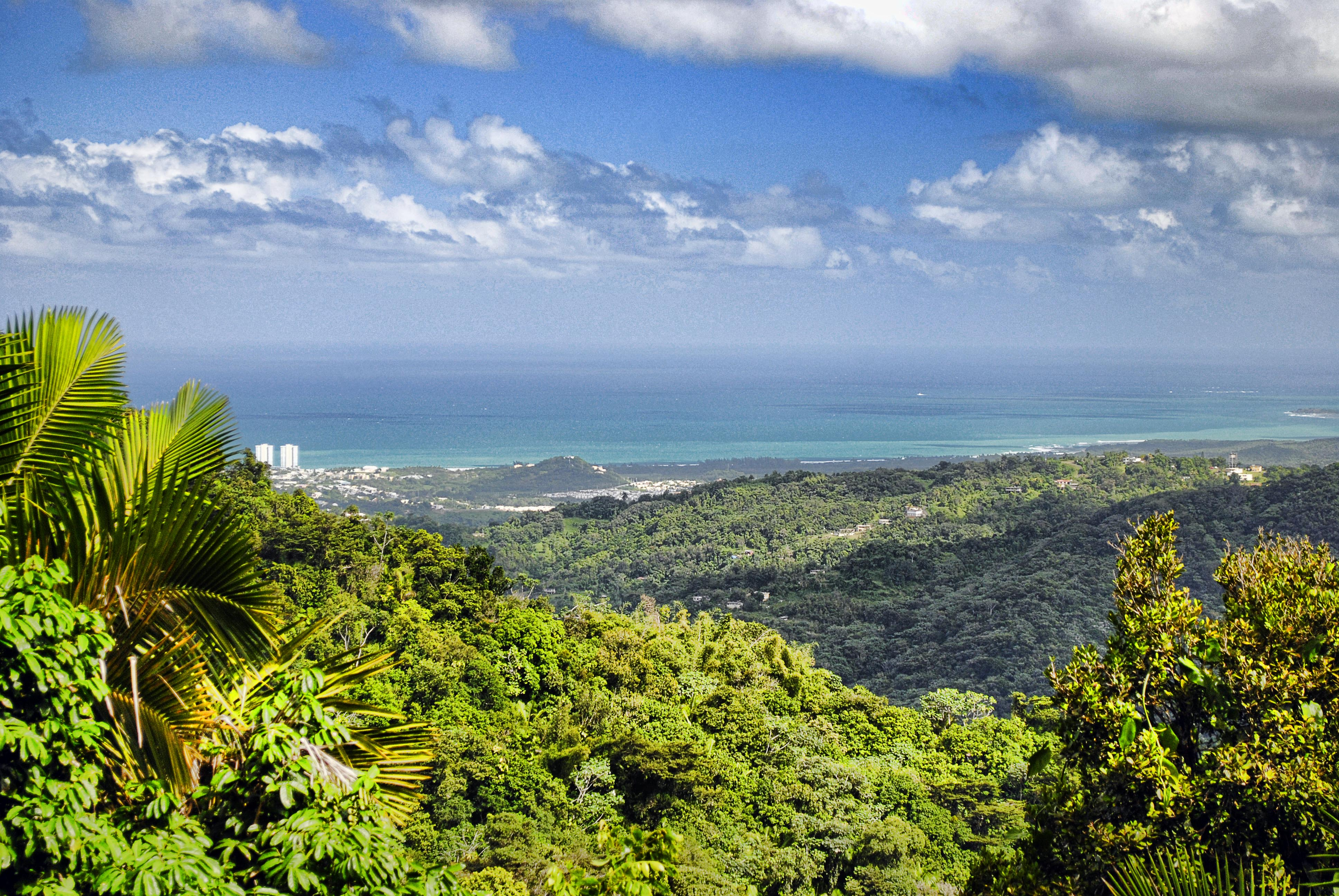
- View from Guzmán Arriba

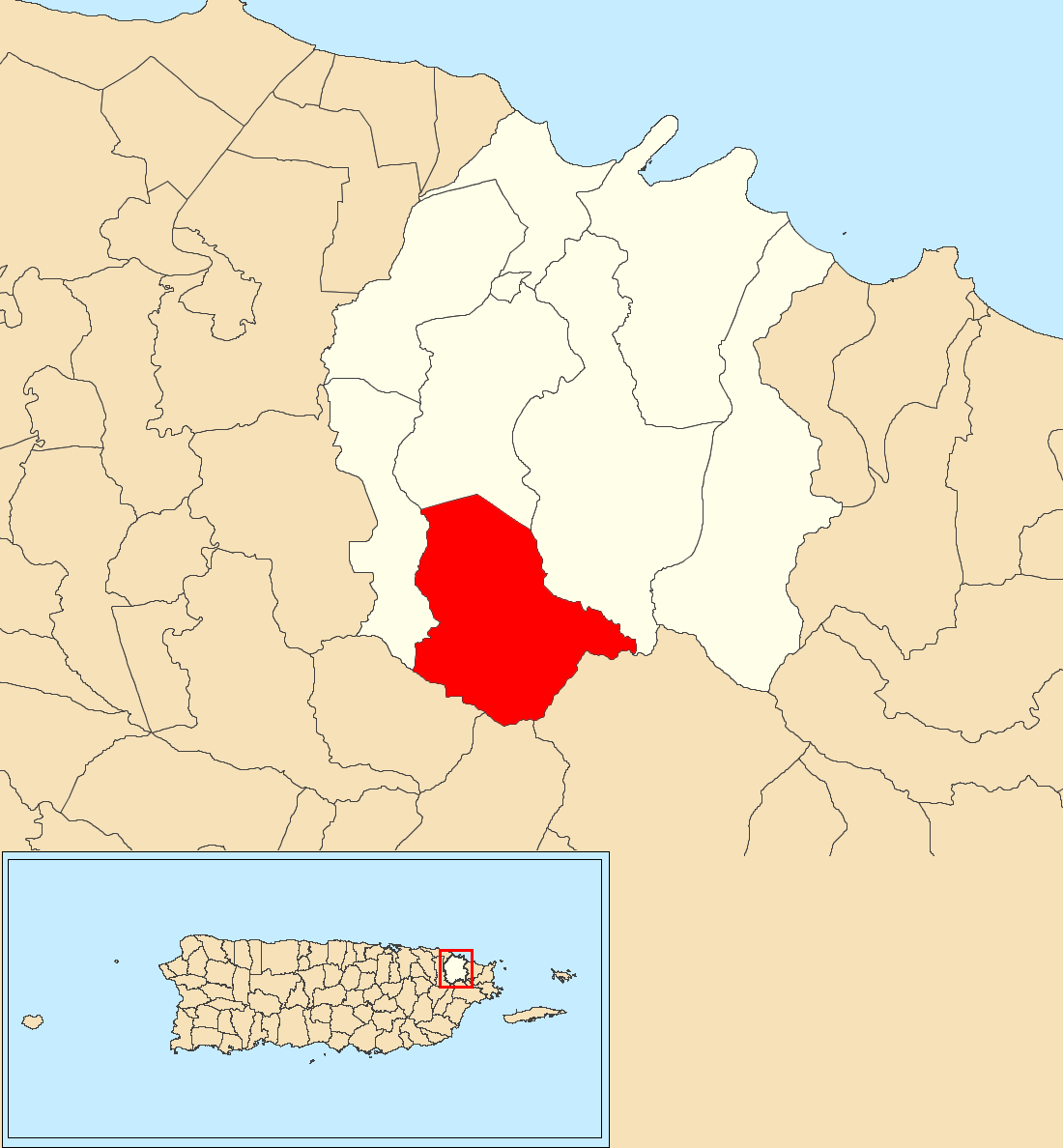
- Location of Guzmán Arriba within the municipality of Río Grande shown in red

- Location of Puerto Rico
- Coordinates: 18°17′26″N 65°49′43″W
- Commonwealth: Puerto Rico
- Municipality: Río Grande

Area
  - Total: 7.84 sq mi (20.3 km^{2})
  - Land: 7.84 sq mi (20.3 km^{2})
  - Water: 0 sq mi (0 km^{2})
- Elevation: 1,762 ft (537 m)

Population (2010)
  - Total: 1,116
  - Density: 142.3/sq mi (54.9/km^{2})
- Source: 2010 Census
- Time zone: UTC−4 (AST)

Guzmán Arriba is a barrio in the municipality of Río Grande, Puerto Rico. Its population in 2010 was 1,116.

== History ==
Guzmán Arriba was in Spain's gazetteers until Puerto Rico was ceded by Spain in the aftermath of the Spanish–American War under the terms of the Treaty of Paris of 1898 and became an unincorporated territory of the United States. In 1899, the United States Department of War conducted a census of Puerto Rico finding that the population of Guzmán Arriba barrio was 1,047.

Lilium is a small, fragrant flower which has been cultivated in Guzmán Arriba for generations.

Historical population
Census	Pop.	Note	%±
1900	1,047		—
1910	1,494		42.7%
1920	1,325		−11.3%
1930	1,078		−18.6%
1940	1,177		9.2%
1950	1,073		−8.8%
1960	547		−49.0%
1970	544		−0.5%
1980	240		−55.9%
1990	765		218.8%
2000	928		21.3%
2010	1,116		20.3%
U.S. Decennial Census; 1899 (shown as 1900) 1910-1930; 1930-1950 1980-2000 2010

== Sectors ==
Barrios (which are, in contemporary times, roughly comparable to minor civil divisions) in turn are further subdivided into smaller local populated place areas/units called sectores (sectors in English). The types of sectores may vary, from normally sector to urbanización to reparto to barriada to residencial, among others.

The following sectors are in Guzmán Arriba barrio:

Comunidad Piza, Sector El Rayo, Sector Medina, and Sector Morovis.

== See also ==
- List of communities in Puerto Rico
- List of barrios and sectors of Río Grande, Puerto Rico
