= Río Grande, Puerto Rico =

Town and municipality in Puerto Rico

Río Grande Municipio de Río Grande
- City and municipality
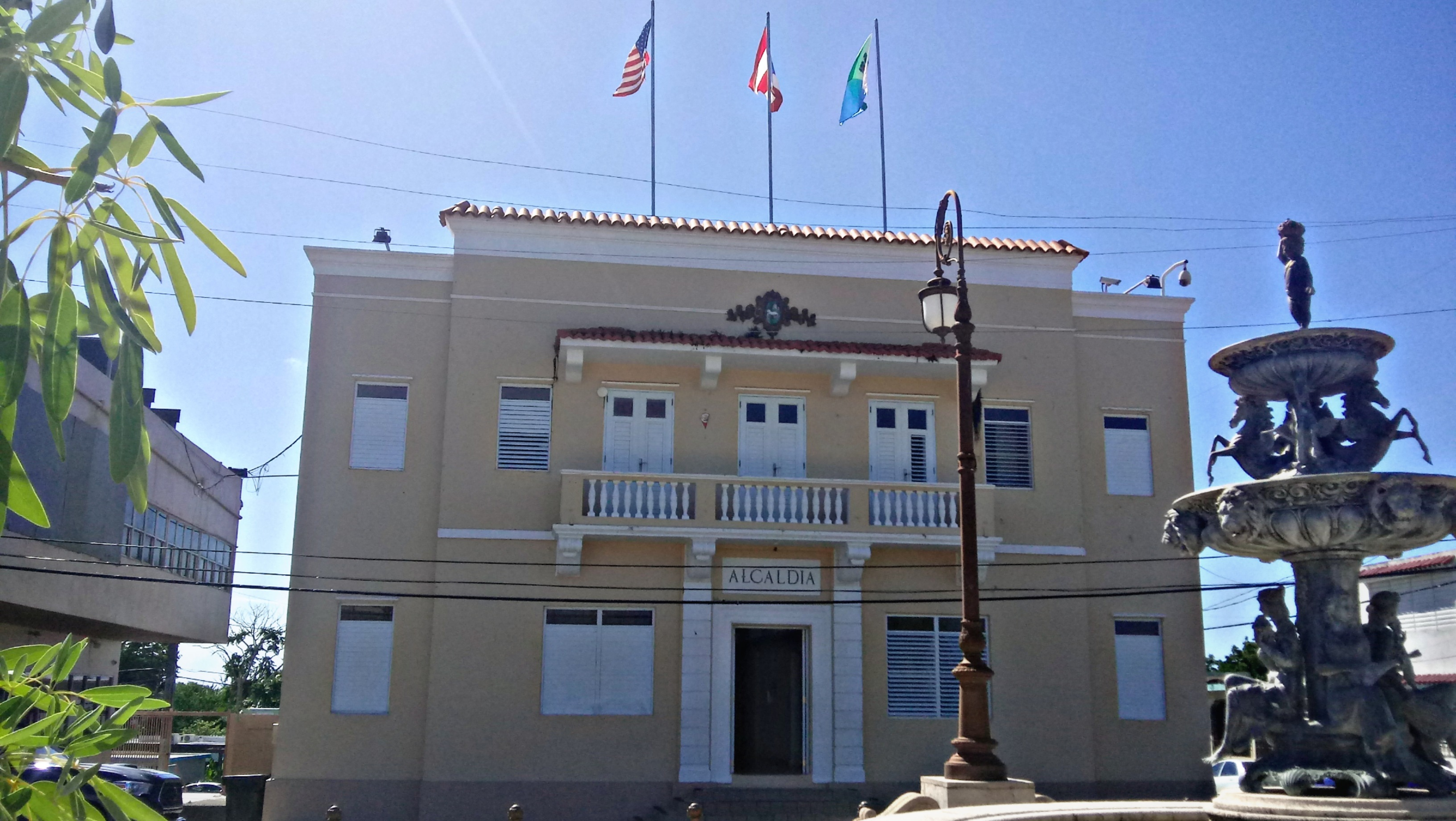
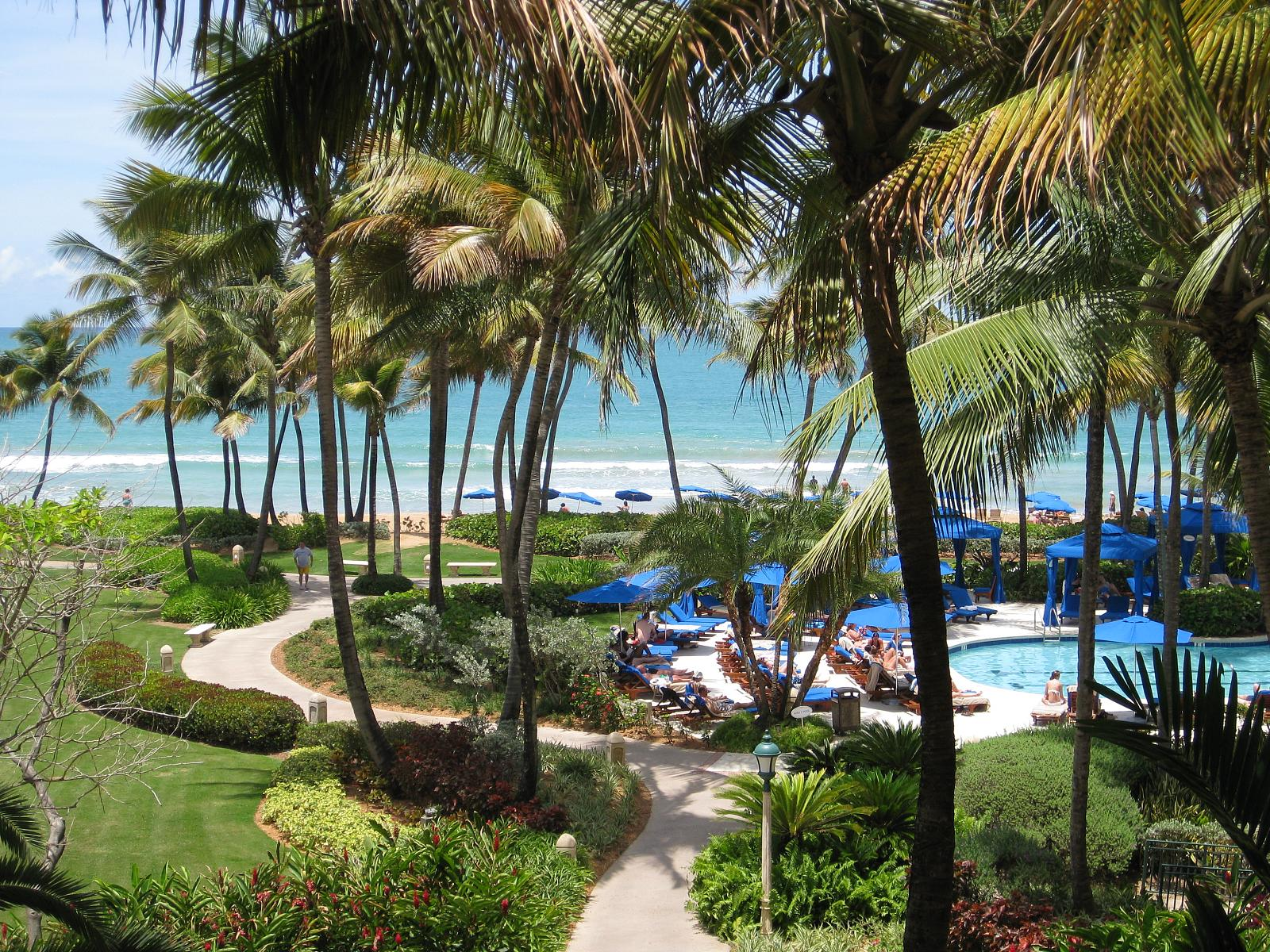
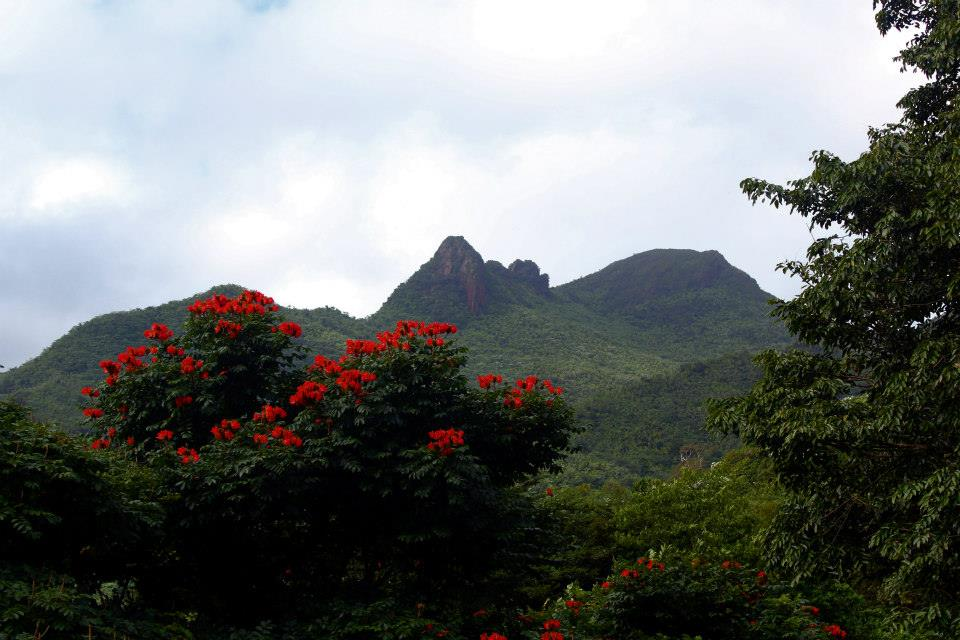
- Río Grande City Hall Río Mar Resort Los Picachos and El Yunque peaks La Coca Falls Mameyes River

- Flag Coat of arms
- Nickname: "La Ciudad de El Yunque"
- Anthem: "Entre las ondas que juguetean"
- Map of Puerto Rico highlighting Río Grande Municipality
- Coordinates: 18°22′49″N 65°49′53″W
- Sovereign state: United States
- Commonwealth: Puerto Rico
- Settled: 1820
- Founded: July 16, 1840
- Founder: Don Desiderio Escobar
- Barrios: 9 barrios: Ciénaga Alta; Ciénaga Baja; Guzmán Abajo; Guzmán Arriba; Herreras; Jiménez; Mameyes II; Río Grande barrio-pueblo; Zarzal

Government
  - Mayor: Hon. Angel "Bori" González (PPD)
  - Senatorial dist.: 8 - Carolina
  - Representative dist.: 36,37

Area
  - Total: 89.62 sq mi (232.11 km^{2})
  - Land: 60.73 sq mi (157.28 km^{2})
  - Water: 28.89 sq mi (74.83 km^{2})
- Elevation: 23 ft (7.0 m)

Population (2020)
  - Total: 47,060
  - Estimate (2025): 44,799 ▼
  - Rank: 16th in Puerto Rico
  - Density: 775.0/sq mi (299.2/km^{2})
- Demonym: Riograndeños
- Time zone: UTC−4 (AST)
- ZIP Codes: 00721, 00745
- Area code: 787/939

Río Grande (Spanish pronunciation: [ˈri.o ˈɣɾande]) is a town and municipality in northeastern Puerto Rico, east of Loíza and Canóvanas, north of Las Piedras, Naguabo, and Ceiba, and west of Luquillo. Immediately outside the urban core of the San Juan metropolitan area, Río Grande is spread over eight barrios and Río Grande Pueblo, its downtown area and administrative center. It is most widely known for containing the largest share of the tropical rainforest of the El Yunque National Forest in the Sierra de Luquillo mountain subrange, including its second-highest peak, the eponymous El Yunque.

== History ==
Río Grande was founded on July 16, 1840, by Desiderio and Quilimaco Escobar, with the approval of Governor Miguel López. It was named after the Río Grande and is located where the Río Grande and the Río Espíritu Santo join.

In 1894, there were two sugar cane haciendas and 256 estancias growing minor fruits.

Hurricane Maria on September 20, 2017, triggered numerous landslides in Río Grande with the significant amount of rainfall. Infrastructure was destroyed, trees were ripped out of the ground, and rivers were breached causing property losses to approximately 5000 people. Of the Puerto Rican amazon, 230 in captivity did survive.

== Geography ==
Río Grande is on the northeastern coast of the island north of the Sierra de Luquillo. A large portion of El Yunque National Forest and some of the highest points of the Sierra de Luquillo are located within Río Grande including El Yunque and El Toro, which at 3,474 feet (1,070 m) is the highest point in eastern Puerto Rico.

=== Barrios ===
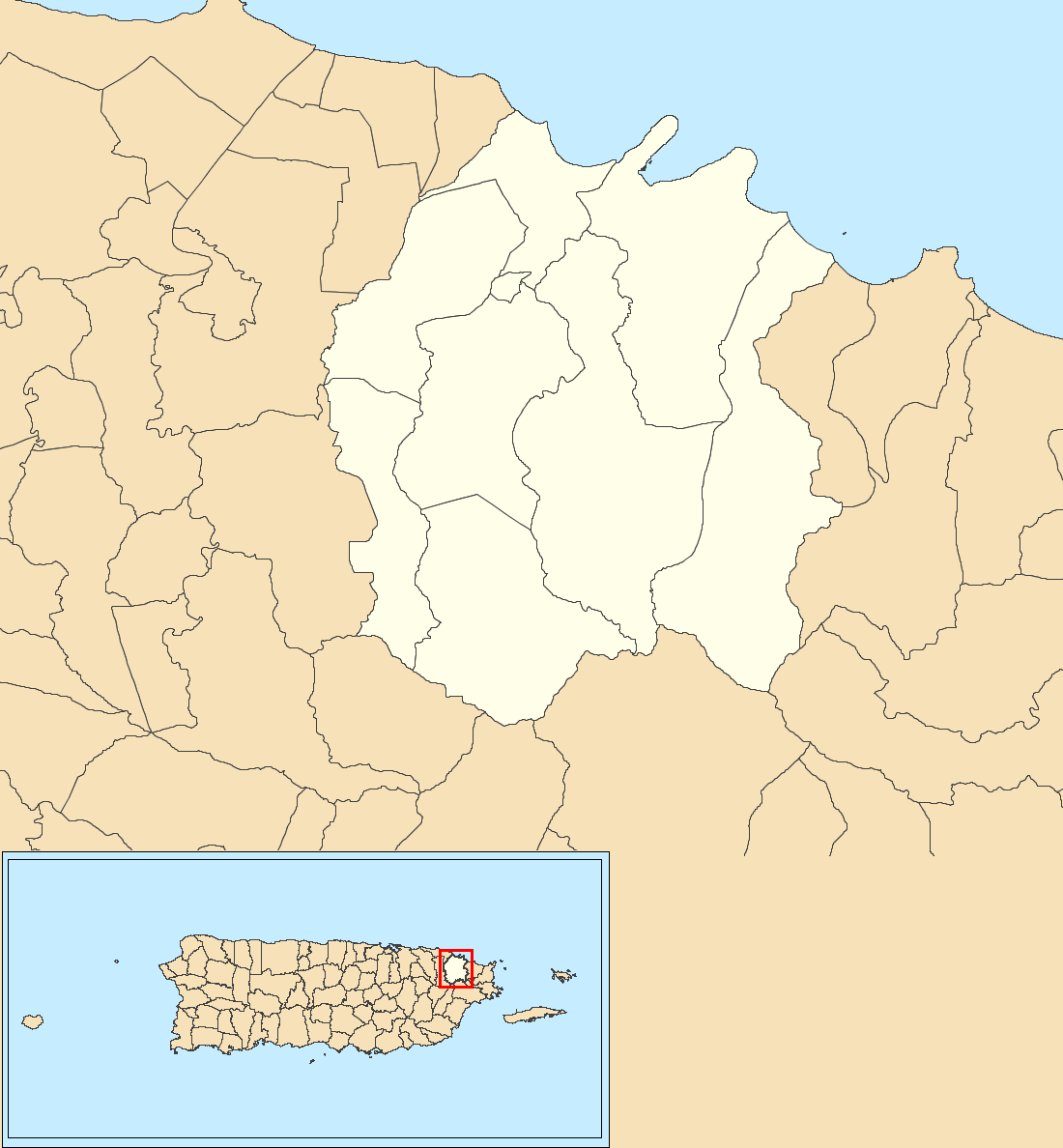
Subdivisions of Río Grande.

Like all municipalities of Puerto Rico, Río Grande is subdivided into barrios (which mean barrios or boroughs or neighborhoods in Spanish). The municipal buildings, central square and a large Catholic church are located in a small, central barrio called barrio-pueblo or simply Pueblo.

1. Ciénaga Alta
2. Ciénaga Baja
3. Guzmán Abajo
4. Guzmán Arriba
5. Herreras
6. Jiménez
7. Mameyes II
8. Río Grande barrio-pueblo
9. Zarzal

=== Sectors ===
Barrios (which are, in contemporary times, roughly comparable to minor civil divisions) are further subdivided into smaller areas called sectores(sectors in English). The types of sectores may vary, from normally sector to urbanización to reparto to barriada to residencial, among others.

=== Special Communities ===
Comunidades Especiales de Puerto Rico (Special Communities of Puerto Rico) are marginalized communities whose citizens are experiencing a certain amount of social exclusion. A map shows these communities occur in nearly every municipality of the commonwealth. Of the 742 places that were on the list in 2014, the following barrios, communities, sectors, or neighborhoods were in Río Grande: Sector Montebello and Sector El Hoyo in Malpica, Las Dolores, La Ponderosa, Villa Realidad, Estancias del Sol, and Hong Kong.

== Demographics ==
In 1894, while a Spanish colony, the population of Río Grande was 6,237. Puerto Rico was ceded by Spain in the aftermath of the Spanish–American War under the terms of the Treaty of Paris of 1898 and became a territory of the United States. In 1899, the United States conducted its first census of Puerto Rico finding that the population of Río Grande was 12,365.

Historical population
Census	Pop.	Note	%±
1900	12,365		—
1910	13,948		12.8%
1920	13,247		−5.0%
1930	14,085		6.3%
1940	16,116		14.4%
1950	16,651		3.3%
1960	17,233		3.5%
1970	22,032		27.8%
1980	34,283		55.6%
1990	45,648		33.2%
2000	52,362		14.7%
2010	54,304		3.7%
2020	47,060		−13.3%
2025 (est.)	44,799	▼	−4.8%
U.S. Decennial Census; 1899 (shown as 1900) 1910-1930; 1930-1950 1960-2000 2010 2020

== Tourism ==
Río Grande is home to one of the largest secluded areas with beach access (Coco Beach) on the entire island. Major hotels in the area include Wyndham Grand Rio Mar Resort and Hyatt Regency Grand Reserve. Every March, Hyatt Regency Grand Reserve plays host to the PGA Tour's Puerto Rico Open.

Within a ten-minute drive is El Yunque National Forest, the only tropical rain forest within the United States National Forest System.

=== Hotels ===
- The Wyndham Grand Rio Mar Beach Resort and Spa
- Hyatt Regency Grand Reserve
- St. Regis Bahía Beach Resort & Golf Club

=== Landmarks and places of interest ===
There are 27 beaches in Río Grande. Main attractions of Río Grande are:

- Coco Beach
- El Yunque
- Indio Cave
- Las Picúas Beach

== Economy ==
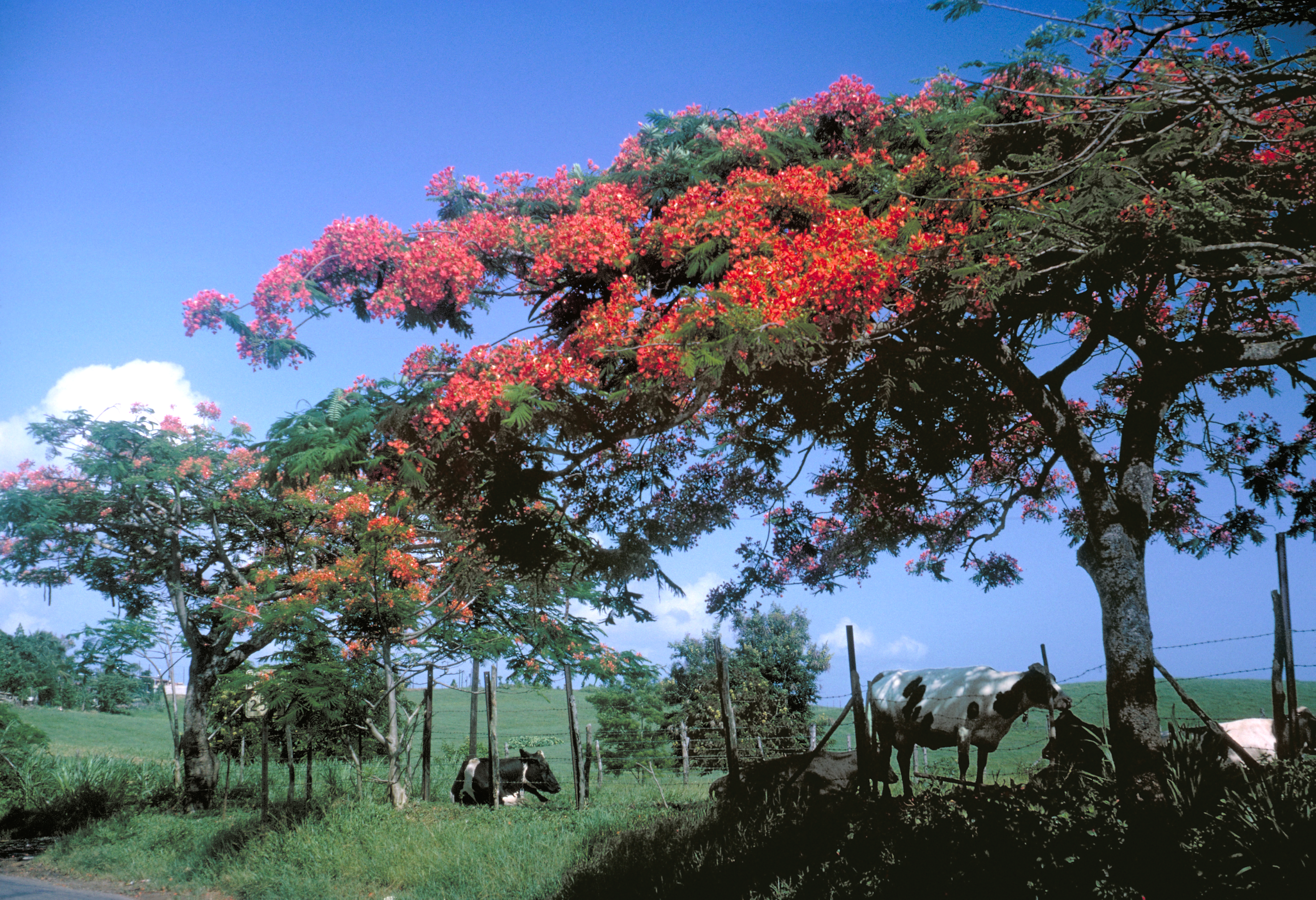
Flame tree and cows in Río Grande

=== Agriculture ===
The municipality has agricultural activity that produces fruits, vegetables, ornamental plants, tobacco, and cattle.

=== Business ===
Local retail stores are aside highway PR-3. There is one large shopping mall located on 65th Infantry expressway and 956th street. The northeastern area of Puerto Rico has attracted hotels, shopping malls, sport venues among others. In 2012 the Puerto Rico Highway 66, which provides easy access to San Juan, was opened which runs along the municipality.

In 2019, volunteers and police who formed a group called Consejo Comunitario de Seguridad de Río Piedras celebrated their 32nd year aiding local businesses with security issues. This group works to ensure the safety and security of business patrons in the downtown area of Río Piedras.

== Culture ==
=== Festivals and events ===
Río Grande celebrates its patron saint festival in July. The Fiestas Patronales de Nuestra Señora del Carmen is a religious and cultural celebration that generally features parades, games, artisans, amusement rides, regional food, and live entertainment.

Other festivals and events celebrated in Río Grande include:

- Río Grande Carnival – July
- Stuffed Potato Festival – April
- Las Picúas Festival – September

=== Sports ===
Baseball, basketball and handball are popular sports in Río Grande.

== Notable people ==
People who were born in, residents of, or otherwise closely associated with Río Grande include:

- Antonio Bachour - Named one of the ten best pastry chefs in America
- Raymond Burgos - Major League Baseball pitcher
- Ovidio de Jesús - Puerto Rican male sprinter who competed at international events
- Luis Pizarro - Puerto Rican boxer who at the 1980 Summer Olympics in Moscow
- Rafael Quintero - Puerto Rican diver who competed in the men's 10 m platform event at the 2016 Summer Olympics

== Government ==
Like all municipalities in Puerto Rico, Río Grande is administered by a mayor. The current mayor is Angel "Bori" González, who was first elected in a special election on September 14, 2014, and has since been re-elected three times, most recently at the 2024 Puerto Rican general elections.

The city belongs to the Puerto Rico Senatorial district VIII, which is represented by two Senators. In 2024, Marissa Jiménez and Héctor Joaquín Sánchez Álvarez were elected as District Senators.

== Transportation ==
There are 48 bridges in Río Grande.

== Symbols ==

The municipio has an official flag and coat of arms.

=== Flag ===
The Río Grande flag consists of two horizontal stripes of equal size, upper one is green with lower one been blue, and united by a white triangle placed on the side of the mast. On the white triangle is a Puerto Rican parrot.

=== Coat of arms ===
In a silver field, two Puerto Rican parrot (Amazona vitatta), accompanied by a waving blue stripe, a green mountain with three peaks. The top portion of the shield is blue, with an opened silver book, accompanied on each side by five gold coins. Topped by a three tower gold crown outlined in black with green openings.

== Gallery ==
Sites around Río Grande:

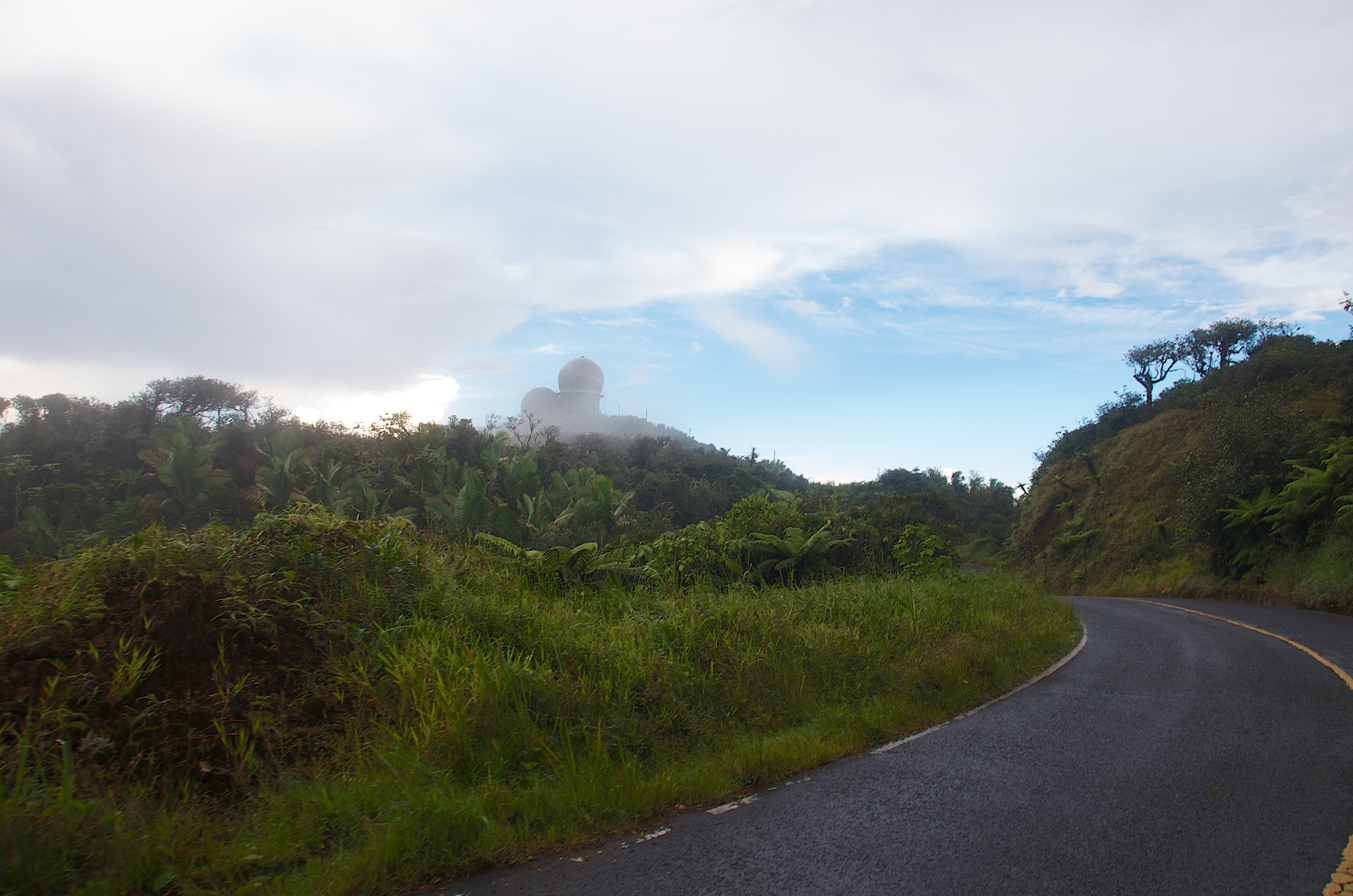
Radar towers atop a mountain at El Yunque rain forest

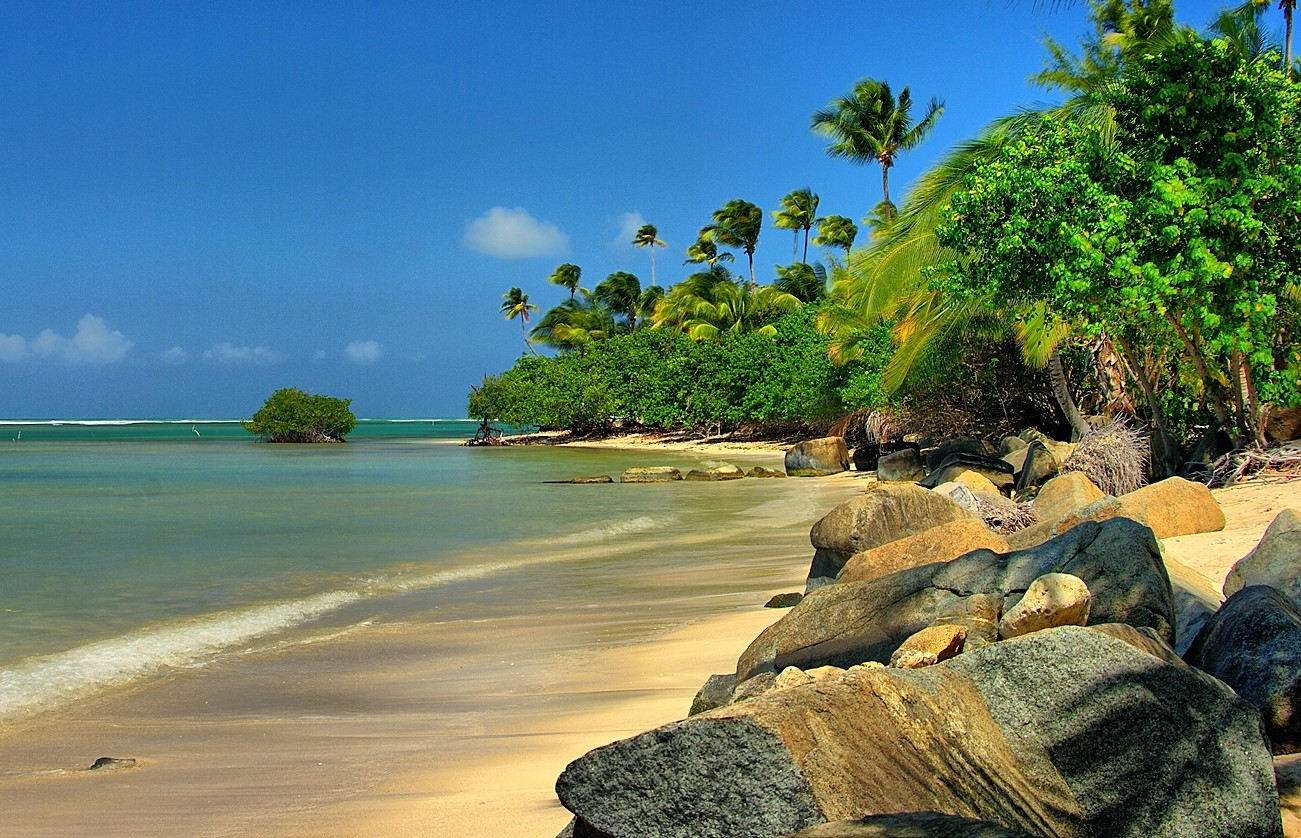
Beach in Río Grande

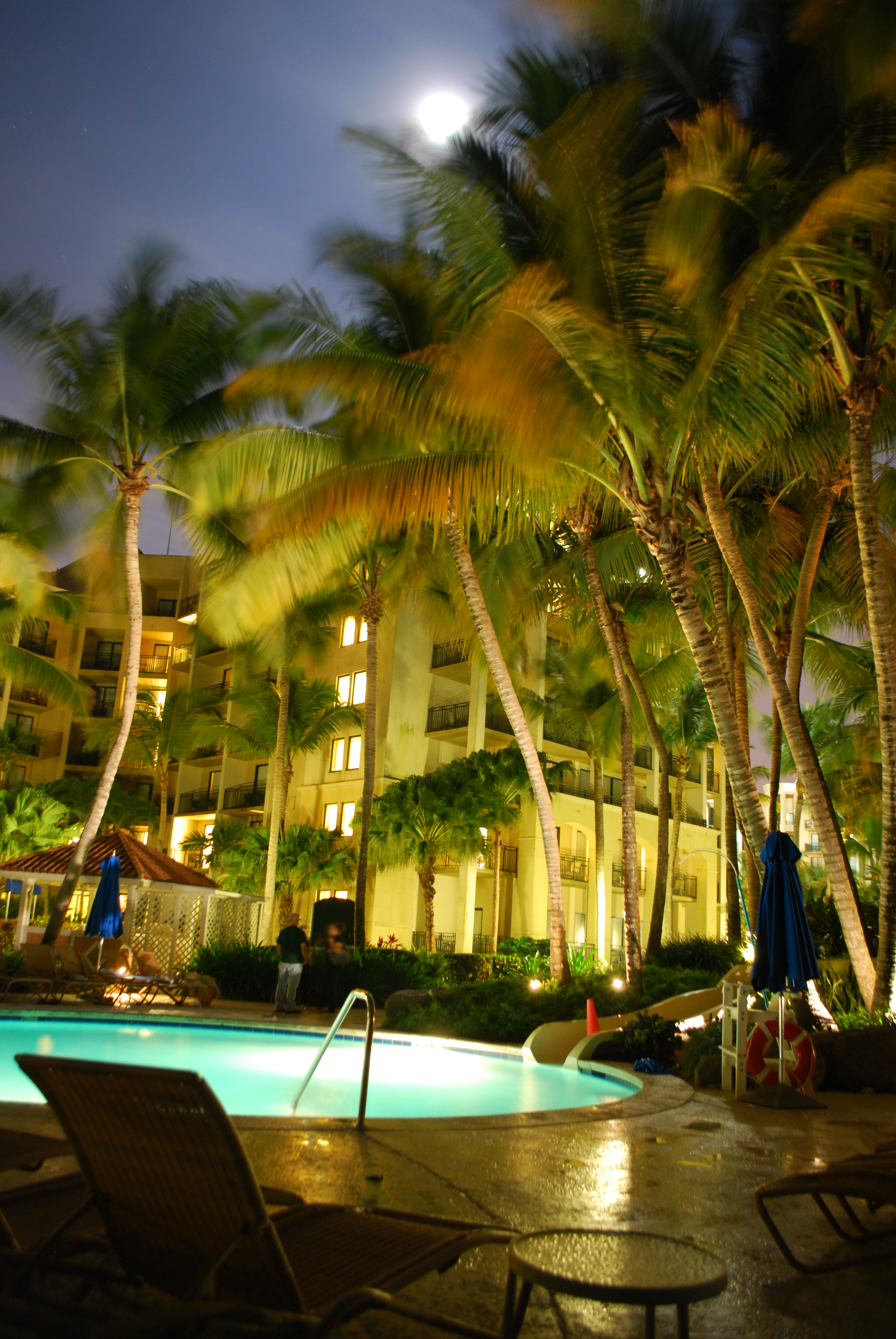
Wyndham Grand Rio Mar Beach Resort & Spa

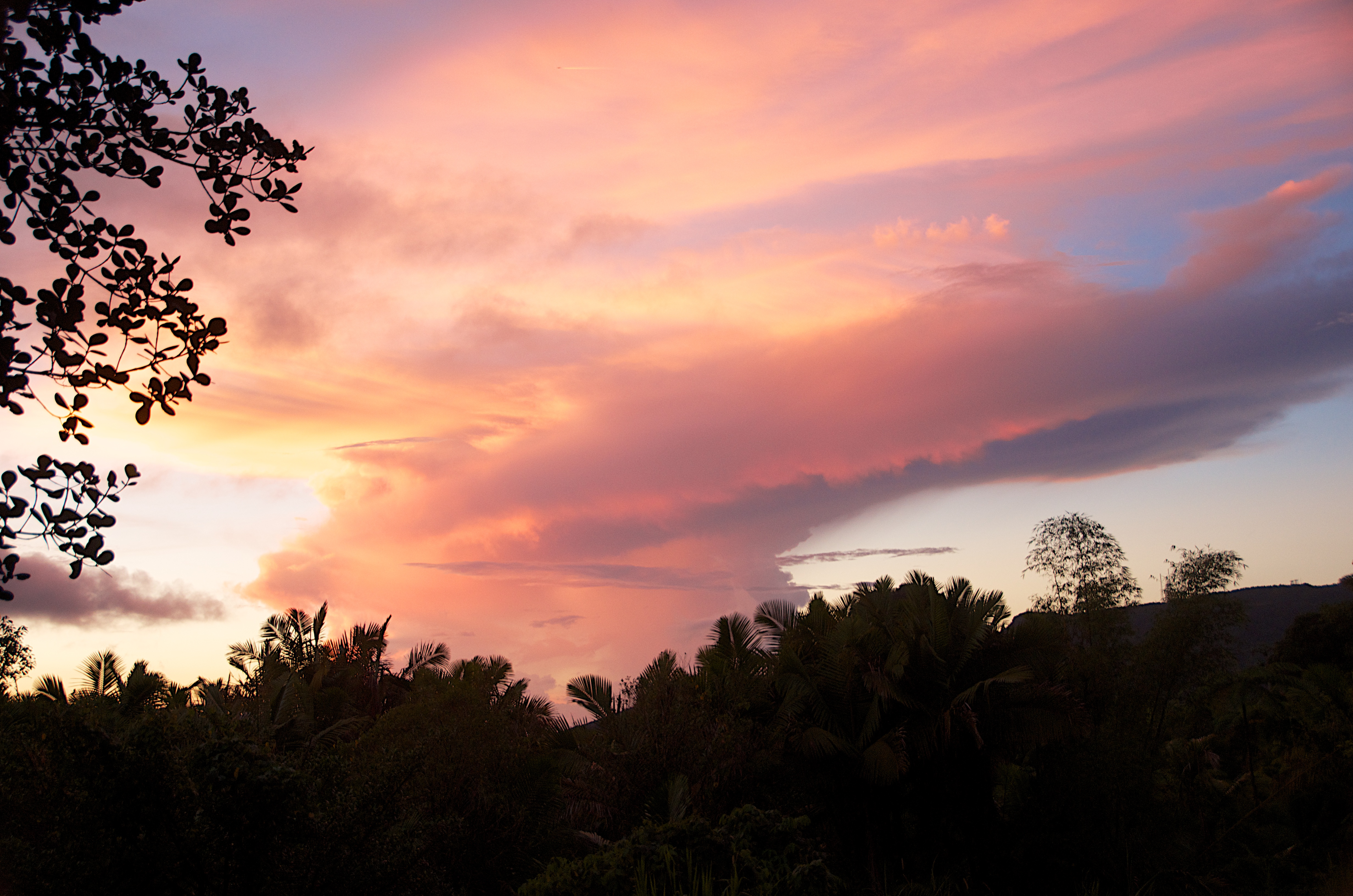
Evening at El Yunque

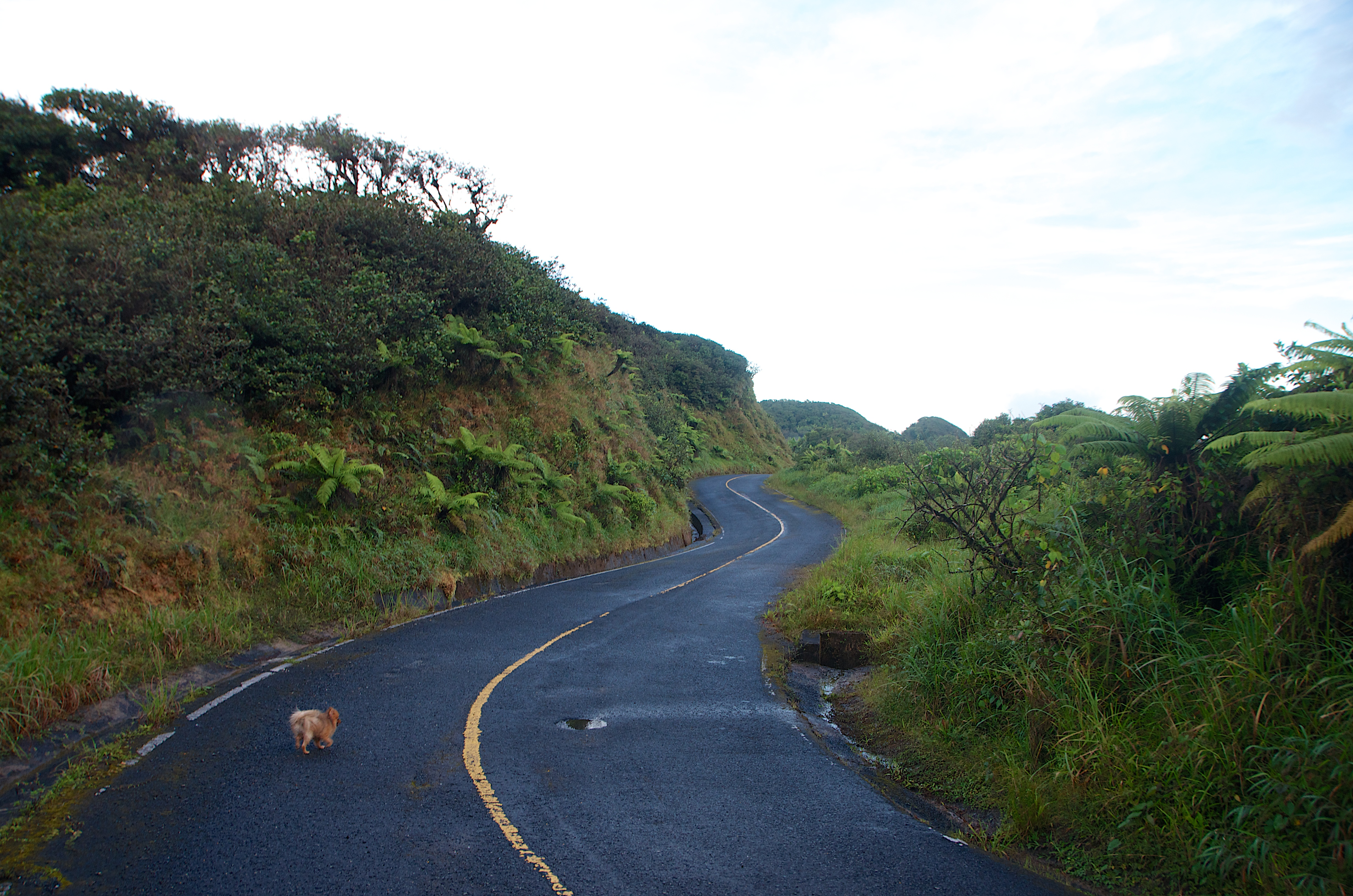
Winding road at El Yunque

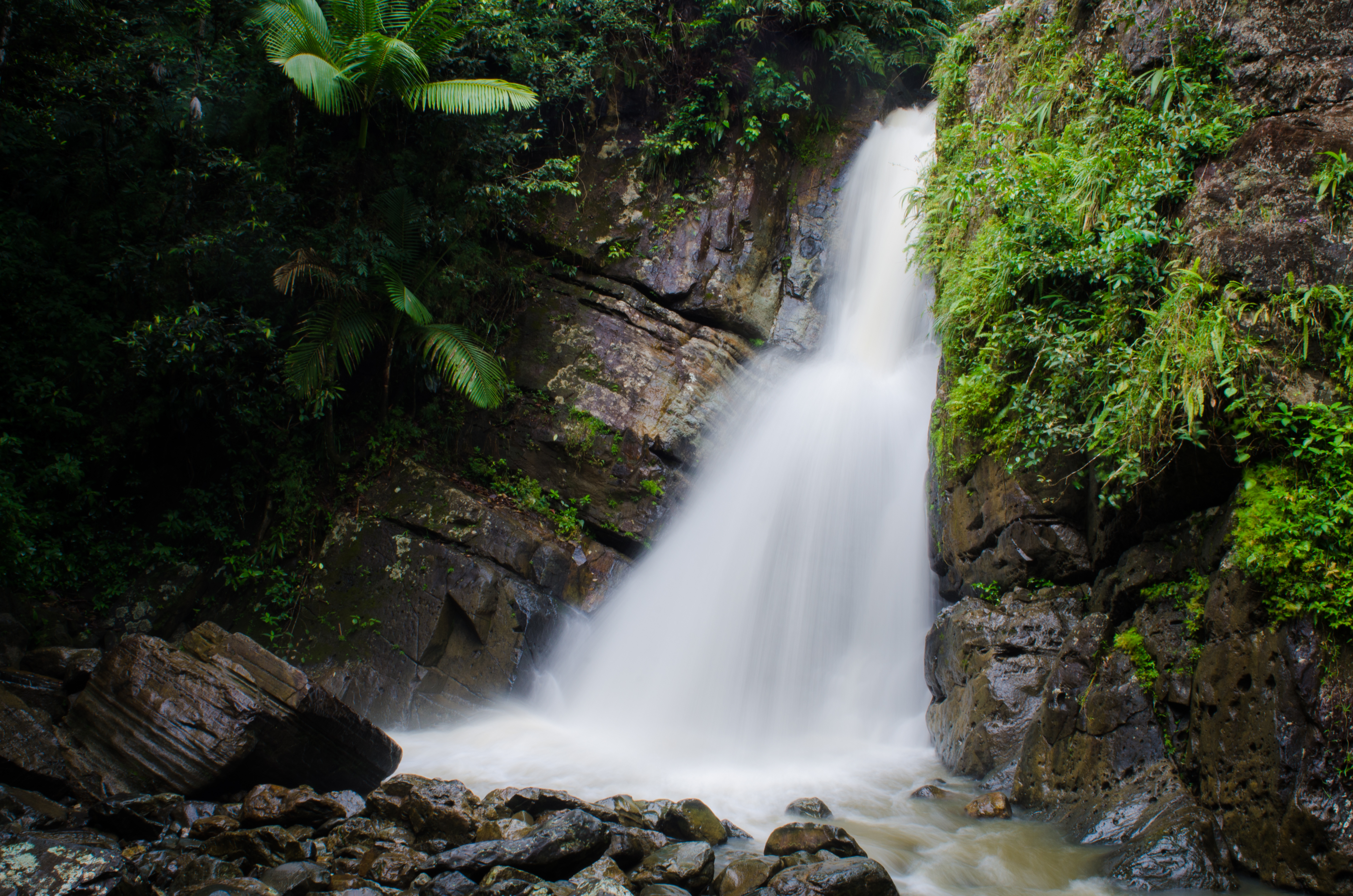
Waterfall in El Yunque

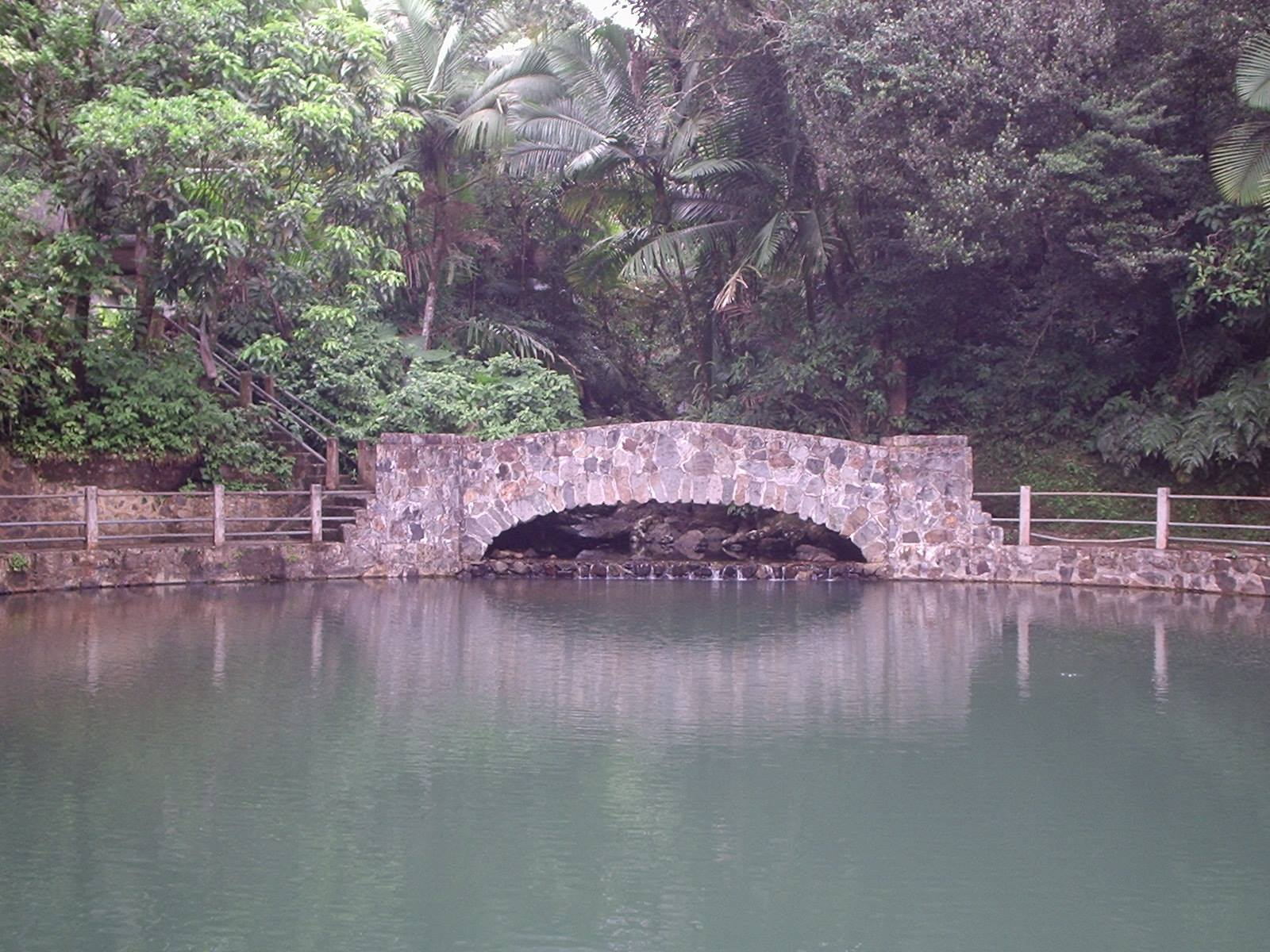
Bridge in Baño Grande

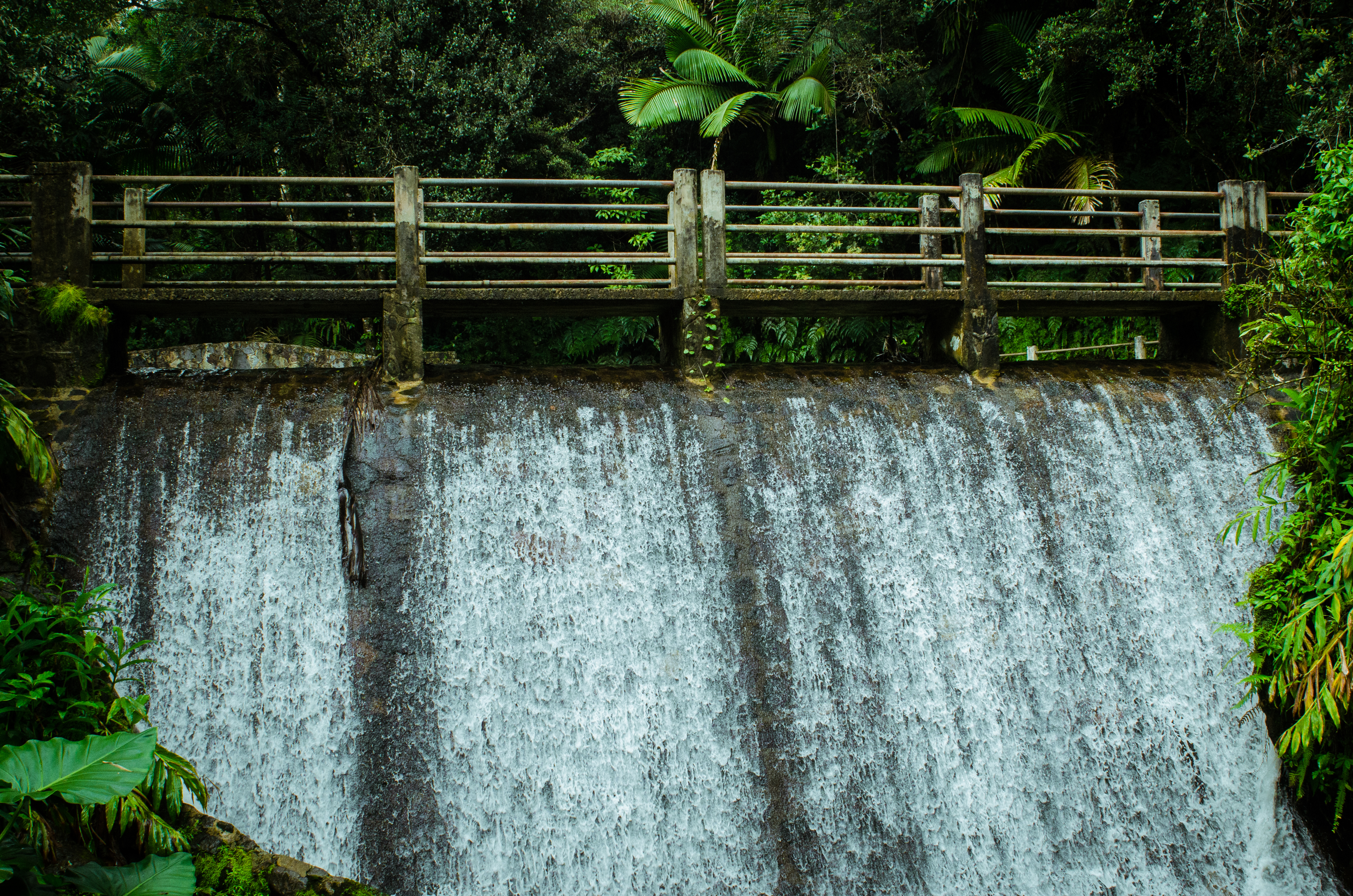
Waterfall at Baño Grande

== See also ==
- List of Puerto Ricans
- History of Puerto Rico
- Did you know-Puerto Rico?
