= Lomas (disambiguation) =

Lomas (Spanish for "hills") are areas of fog-watered vegetation in the coastal desert of Peru and northern Chile.

Lomas may also refer to:

== Places ==
=== Argentina ===
- Lomas de Zamora Partido, Buenos Aires Province, a district
  - Lomas de Zamora, Buenos Aires Province, a city and capitol of the district
- Lomas del Mirador, Buenos Aires Province, a city

=== Chile ===
- Bahía Lomas, a bay
- Bahía Lomas, Dawson Island, a bay

=== Puerto Rico ===
- Lomas, Canóvanas, Puerto Rico, a barrio
- Lomas, Juana Díaz, Puerto Rico, a barrio
- Lomas, Naranjito, Puerto Rico, a barrio

=== Elsewhere ===
- Lomas de Barbudal Biological Reserve, Costa Rica
- Lomas de Sargentillo, Guayas, Ecuador, a town
- Lomas de Chapultepec, Mexico, a residential barrio in Mexico City
- Toplița (Mureș) (Hungarian: Lomaș), Romania, a river
- Lomas de Lachay, a national reserve in Lima, Peru
- Lomas de Campos, Spain, a municipality

== People ==
- Lomas (surname)
- Lomas Brown (born 1963), American football offensive tackle

== Other uses ==
- Lomas Athletic Club, an Argentine sports club
- Lomas Open, a former golf tournament on the PGA of Argentina Tour
- Lomas & Nettleton Building (now Franklin Lofts), a low-rise building in Houston, Texas generally regarded as the first skyscraper in the city

== See also ==
- Lomas Taurinas, Tijuana, Mexico, a neighborhood of Tijuana
- Lomas Verdes, Mexico
- Tres Lomas, Buenos Aires Province
- Tres Lomas Partido, Buenos Aires Province
- Las Lomas (disambiguation)
- La Loma (disambiguation)
- Lomax (disambiguation)
- Loomis (disambiguation)
