= La Loma =

La Loma may refer to:

== Places ==
=== United States ===
- La Loma, Modesto, California, a neighborhood of Modesto
- La Loma Bridge, Pasadena, California
- La Loma Hills, southern California
- La Loma Park, in the San Francisco Bay Area, California
- La Loma, New Mexico, an unincorporated community

=== Elsewhere ===
- La Loma, Santiago, Argentina, a town and municipality
- La Loma, Coclé, Panama, a town
- La Loma, Quezon City, a district of Quezon City, Philippines
- La Loma Cemetery, Manila
- La Loma (Jaén), a comarca in Andalusia, Spain
- La Loma railway station, a Felipe Ángeles station

== Other uses ==
- Battle of la Loma, a minor 1865 engagement in Mexico won by a Belgian force
- La Loma Foods, a former American manufacturer of vegetarian and vegan foods

== See also ==
- La Loma tree frog
- La Loma salamander
- La Loma Plaza Historic District, a historic neighborhood in Taos, New Mexico, United States
- Loma (disambiguation)
- Las Lomas (disambiguation)
