= Lomax (surname) =

Other names
- Variant forms: Lomas, Lennox

Lomax is a surname. Notable people and characters with the surname include:

- Alan Lomax (1915–2002), American musicologist, son of John Avery Lomax
- Bess Lomax Hawes (1921–2009), American folklorist and folk musician, sister of Alan
- Cathy Lomax (born 1963), London artist
- David Lomax (1938–2014), British television reporter
- David Lomax (born 1970), New Zealand rugby league footballer
- Eric Lomax (1919–2012), British Army officer, author of The Railway Man
- Geoff Lomax (1925–1992), English cricketer
- Ian Lomax (1931–1996), English cricketer and racehorse trainer
- Jack Lomax (disambiguation), multiple people
- Jackie Lomax (1944–2013), English singer-songwriter and guitarist
- Jane Lomax-Smith (born 1950), Australian politician
- James Lomax, member of the Alabama House of Representatives
- Jerrold E. Lomax (1927–2014), American architect
- John Lomax (disambiguation), multiple people
- Judith Lomax (1774–1828), American poet and religious writer
- Kelvin Lomax (born 1986), English footballer
- Lucius Lomax (1878–1961), American bookie and underworld figure
- Lunsford L. Lomax (1835–1913), American Civil War general
- Michael Lomax (born 1947), American educator and philanthropist
- Michael Trappes-Lomax (1900–1972), English poet, soldier, and historian
- Neil Lomax (born 1959), American football quarterback
- Noah Lomax (born 2001), American actor
- Rachel Lomax (born 1945), British economist and former government official
- Ruby Terrill Lomax (1886–1961), American musicologist and wife of John Avery Lomax
- Samuel Lomax (1855–1915), British First World War general
- Scott Lomax (born 1982), British writer and justice campaigner
- Tom Lomax (born 1945), English sculptor
- Tyrel Lomax (born 1996), New Zealand rugby union player
- Vernon Lomax Smith (born 1927), American professor of business economics and law, Nobel laureate
- Walter P. Lomax Jr. (1932–2013), American physician and entrepreneur

Fictional characters

- Bernie Lomax, antagonist in the film Weekend at Bernie's
- Byron Lomax, alien in human form in The Outer Limits episode O.B.I.T.
- Dottie Lomax, in "The Adventure of the Wary Witness," an episode of the 1970s television series Ellery Queen
- Eddie Lomax, played by Gary Busey in the 1993 film The Firm
- Freddy Lomax, played by Jake Busey in Season 4 of the television series Mr. Robot
- Hollis Lomax, William Stoner's nemesis in the novel Stoner by John Williams
- Kevin Lomax, protagonist in the film The Devil's Advocate
- Lomax, Joseph William and Rob, in the 1998 film Mercury Rising
- Lomax the Sublibrarian for the London Library in the Sherlock Holmes story "The Adventure of the Illustrious Client"
- Lomax (no first name given), played by Kirk Douglas in the film The War Wagon
- Lomax (no first name given), played by Benedict Wong in the film Annihilation
- Mrs. Lomax, the school librarian in The Map Trap by Andrew Clements
- Oscar Lomax, blind millionaire from Ilkley in the TV Series Psychoville
- Danny Lomax in Hollyoaks
- Peri Lomax in Hollyoaks
- Vera Lomax, daughter of Coronation Street character Ena Sharples

== See also ==
- Lomas (surname)
- Loomis (surname)
