= Lomax =

Lomax may refer to:

== Places in the United States ==
- Lomax, Illinois, a village in Henderson County
- Lomax Township, Henderson County, Illinois
- Lomax, Indiana, an unincorporated community
- Lomax, La Porte, Texas, a neighborhood

== Entertainment ==
- Lomax (band), a British rock band
- Lomax, one half of drum and bass duo Loadstar
- Lomax, the Hound of Music, a children's television show on PBS
- The Adventures of Lomax, a video game known as Lomax in Europe

== Other uses ==
- Lomax (surname)
- Lomax (kit car), a Citroën 2CV–based kit car, styled like a three-wheel Morgan

== See also ==
- Lomax distribution, used in business modeling
- Lomas (disambiguation)
