= Loma =

Loma may refer to:

== Geography ==
=== United States ===
- Loma, Colorado, an unincorporated community and census-designated place
- Loma, Montana, a census-designated place
- Loma, Nebraska, an unincorporated community
- Loma, North Dakota, a city

=== Other countries ===
- Loma (woreda), a district in Southern Nations, Nationalities, and Peoples' Region, Ethiopia
- Loma Bosa, also known as Loma, a former woreda of Ethiopia
- Loma (Jandaha), Vaishali, Bihar, India, a Gram panchayat consisting of two villages, one also named Loma
- Loma, Ladakh, a town in Ladakh, India
- Loma Mountains, a mountain range in Sierra Leone

== People ==
- Loma people, residing in West Africa, primarily Guinea and Liberia
- Aleksandar Loma (born 1955), Serbian philologist
- Arsenije Loma (1768–1815), Serbian voivode (military commander)
- Vasiliy Lomachenko (born 1988), Ukrainian boxer nicknamed "Loma"
- MC Loma (born 2002), Brazilian singer
- Loma Lookboonmee (born 1996), Thai martial artist

== Other uses ==
- Loma (band), an American indie rock band
- Loma language, spoken by the Loma
- Lomakka language, also called Loma, spoken in Ivory Coast by the Lomapo
- Loma (microsporidian), a genus of microsporidians
- Loma Records, a 1960s subsidiary of Warner Bros. Records
- Letter of Map Amendment (LOMA), a document issued by the National Flood Insurance Program
- Life Office Management Association (LOMA), an insurance trade association

== See also ==
- César de Loma (born 1975), Spanish former footballer
- Cédric De La Loma (born 1984), French former footballer
- La Loma (disambiguation)
- Lomas (disambiguation)
