= List of public art in the Metropolitan Borough of Walsall =

This is a list of public art in the Metropolitan Borough of Walsall, in the West Midlands, England. This list applies only to works of public art accessible in an outdoor public space. For example, this does not include artwork visible inside a museum.

== Walsall ==
=== Town Centre ===
Image	Title / subject	Location and coordinates	Date	Artist / designer	Type	Material	Dimensions	Designation	Owner / administrator	Wikidata	Notes
More images	John Henry Carless VC	Lichfield Street, Walsall 52.585906°N 1.979087°W	1919	Robert Jackson	Bust	Bronze			Walsall Metropolitan Borough Council	Q26677017	
More images	Numbers	Park Street 52.586033°N 1.984899°W		Chris Edmunds	Mural					Q47455348	
	Walsall Market Cross	52.583048°N 1.979223°W	2013		Relief					Q47455357	
More images	Nonsense Poem Carving	Walsall Station 52.584510°N 1.984849°W	1995	Matthew and Bryant Fedden	Poem fragments	Wood	Various from 25cm x 25cm to 30cm x 130cm		West Midlands Network		Poem on 21 wooden pieces around the station

=== Market Place ===
Image	Title / subject	Location and coordinates	Date	Artist / designer	Type	Material	Dimensions	Designation	Owner / administrator	Wikidata	Notes
More images	The Concrete Hippopotamus	Walsall Market Place - Park Street, Walsall 52.584264°N 1.982023°W	1972	John Wood	Sculpture	Concrete			John Wood B.A M.D.L	Q47455447	
More images	The Source of Ingenuity	Walsall Market Place, Walsall 52.584285°N 1.981883°W		Tom Lomax	Sculpture / fountain	Bronze			Walsall Metropolitan Borough Council	Q47455482	
More images	Sister Dora	Lloyds Bank, Walsall Market Place - Park Street, Walsall 52.584211°N 1.98221°W	1886	Francis John Williamson	Statue	Bronze			Walsall Metropolitan Borough Council	Q47455461	

=== Saddlers Shopping Centre ===
Image	Title / subject	Location and coordinates	Date	Artist / designer	Type	Material	Dimensions	Designation	Owner / administrator	Notes
More images	Walsall Saddle	Outside Saddlers Shopping Centre, Bradford Street, Walsall 52.583690°N 1.983010°W		Tom Lomax	Sculpture	Bronze			Walsall Metropolitan Borough Council	
More images	Walsall Nombelisk	Outside Saddlers Shopping Centre - Bradford Street, Walsall 52.583690°N 1.983010°W		Tom Lomax	Sculpture	Bronze			Walsall Metropolitan Borough Council	

=== Walsall Arboretum ===
Image	Title / subject	Location and coordinates	Date	Artist / designer	Type	Material	Dimensions	Designation	Owner / administrator	Wikidata	Notes
More images	Jerome K. Jerome	Near the Lodge at Walsall Arboretum 52.58907281692238°N 1.9750350013084497°W	June 11, 2016	Phil Kelly	Bust	Bronze			Walsall Metropolitan Borough Council		The Jerome K. Jerome Society lobbied for the author to be recognised in his home town
	Fluffy the Oss	Near the Visitor Centre at Walsall Arboretum 52.59100371147015°N 1.9709192013990866°W	1990s, moved here in 2017	Marjan Wouda	Horse statue	Bronze			Walsall Metropolitan Borough Council		Was originally outside the Civic Centre in Walsall in the 1990s. Relocated near the Visitor Centre at the Arboretum in 2017. It is part of the Industrial Garden. It had previously been vandalised and held in storage for years.

== Bescot ==
Image	Title / subject	Location and coordinates	Date	Artist / designer	Type	Material	Dimensions	Designation	Owner / administrator	Wikidata	Notes
More images	Bescot Stadium Station railing sculpture	Bescot Stadium Station 52.563975°N 1.990779°W			Sculpture				West Midlands Network		The railings go under the M6 and over the River Tame, between the Metropolitan Boroughs of Sandwell and Walsall. A Gaelic Blessing by John Rutter is on paving stones on the footpath

== Bloxwich ==
Image	Title / subject	Location and coordinates	Date	Artist / designer	Type	Material	Dimensions	Designation	Owner / administrator	Wikidata	Notes
	Bloxwich Station sculpture	Bloxwich Station, Croxdene Avenue, Bloxwich 52.617747°N 2.010971°W	2010		Sculpture				West Midlands Network		Similar sculptures at Bloxwich North Station, Cannock Station, Hednesford Station and Rugeley Town Station
	Bloxwich North Station sculpture	Bloxwich North Station, Broad Lane, Bloxwich 52.625555°N 2.017554°W	2010		Sculpture				West Midlands Network		Similar sculptures at Bloxwich Station, Cannock Station, Hednesford Station and Rugeley Town Station

== Brownhills ==
Image	Title / subject	Location and coordinates	Date	Artist / designer	Type	Material	Dimensions	Designation	Owner / administrator	Wikidata	Notes
More images	Jigger	Brownhills 52.64855°N 1.93569°W		John McKenna	Sculpture	Stainless steel	13 metres (43 ft)		Walsall Metropolitan Borough Council	Q47455512	

== Willenhall ==
=== Town Centre ===
Image	Title / subject	Location and coordinates	Date	Artist / designer	Type	Material	Dimensions	Designation	Owner / administrator	Notes
More images	Willenhall Lock Makers	Market Place, Willenhall 52.584566°N 2.055535°W	2001	Freeform Arts Trust Ltd & Andrew Langley	Sculpture	Black and white painting on board			Walsall Metropolitan Borough Council	
More images	Four Keys	Junction of Market Place and Walsall Street; junction of Cross Street and Upper Lichfield Street; junction of Stafford Street and Union Street; junction of New Road and Newlands Close, Willenhall 52.584931°N 2.056029°W	2000	Freeform Arts Trust Ltd & Andrew Langley	Sculpture	Mild steel plate, with black epoxy paint			Walsall Metropolitan Borough Council	Four Keys
More images	Memorial to the Lockmaking Industry	33 Market Place, Willenhall 52.584034°N 2.054751°W	1968	Staff & Pupils of Willenhall Comprehensive School	Sculpture	Fibre-glass, painted grey			Owen and Gravestock, Accountants, 33 Market Place	Renovated in 1994
	Roots in Willenhall	Wedge Group Galvanizing Ltd, Stafford Street, Willenhall 52.58643°N 2.05712°W	2012		Sculpture	Galvanised steel			Wedge Group Galvanizing Ltd	

=== Willenhall Memorial Park ===
Image	Title / subject	Location and coordinates	Date	Artist / designer	Type	Material	Dimensions	Designation	Owner / administrator	Notes
More images	Flock of Birds	Willenhall Memorial Park 52.58621°N 2.06199°W	2005	Planet Art (Julie Edwards and Ron Thompson)	Sculpture trail	Metal			Walsall Metropolitan Borough Council	Part of Healthy Walking Routes. A commission of 30 bird sculptures. The ten sculptures in each green space form a healthy walking route which has a different theme with maps and health information.
More images	Wooden sculptures	Willenhall Memorial Park 52.58770°N 2.06501°W	2023	Planet Art (Julie Edwards and Ron Thompson)	Sculpture trail	Carved wood			Walsall Metropolitan Borough Council	There is also various wooden sculptures such as a soldier, owl and robin.

=== Keyway Island ===
Image	Title / subject	Location and coordinates	Date	Artist / designer	Type	Material	Dimensions	Designation	Owner / administrator	Notes
	Levers of a Lock Mechanism	Keyway Island, Willenhall 52.582528°N 2.067400°W			Sculpture	Stainless steel			Walsall Metropolitan Borough Council	Depicts the levers of a lock mechanism. The artwork is a public art piece representing the internal components of a lock, celebrating the local area's historic lock and key industries. The sculpture was originally located on the corner of Well Lane and Wednesfield Road (the Assa Abloy site). It was provided under Wolverhampton Council's "Percent for Art" policy when the original building was constructed. Assa Abloy reached an agreement with Wolverhampton City Council and Walsall Council to move the sculpture to its current location on the Keyway Island roundabout near the border of Wolverhampton and Walsall.
