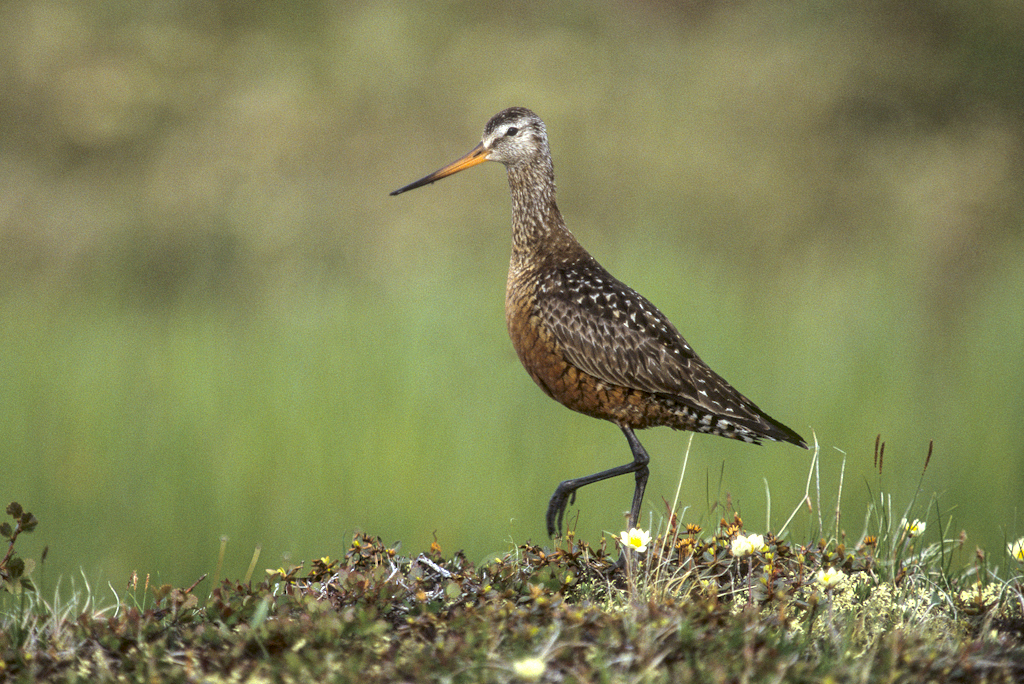
- Male in breeding plumage, Churchill, Canada
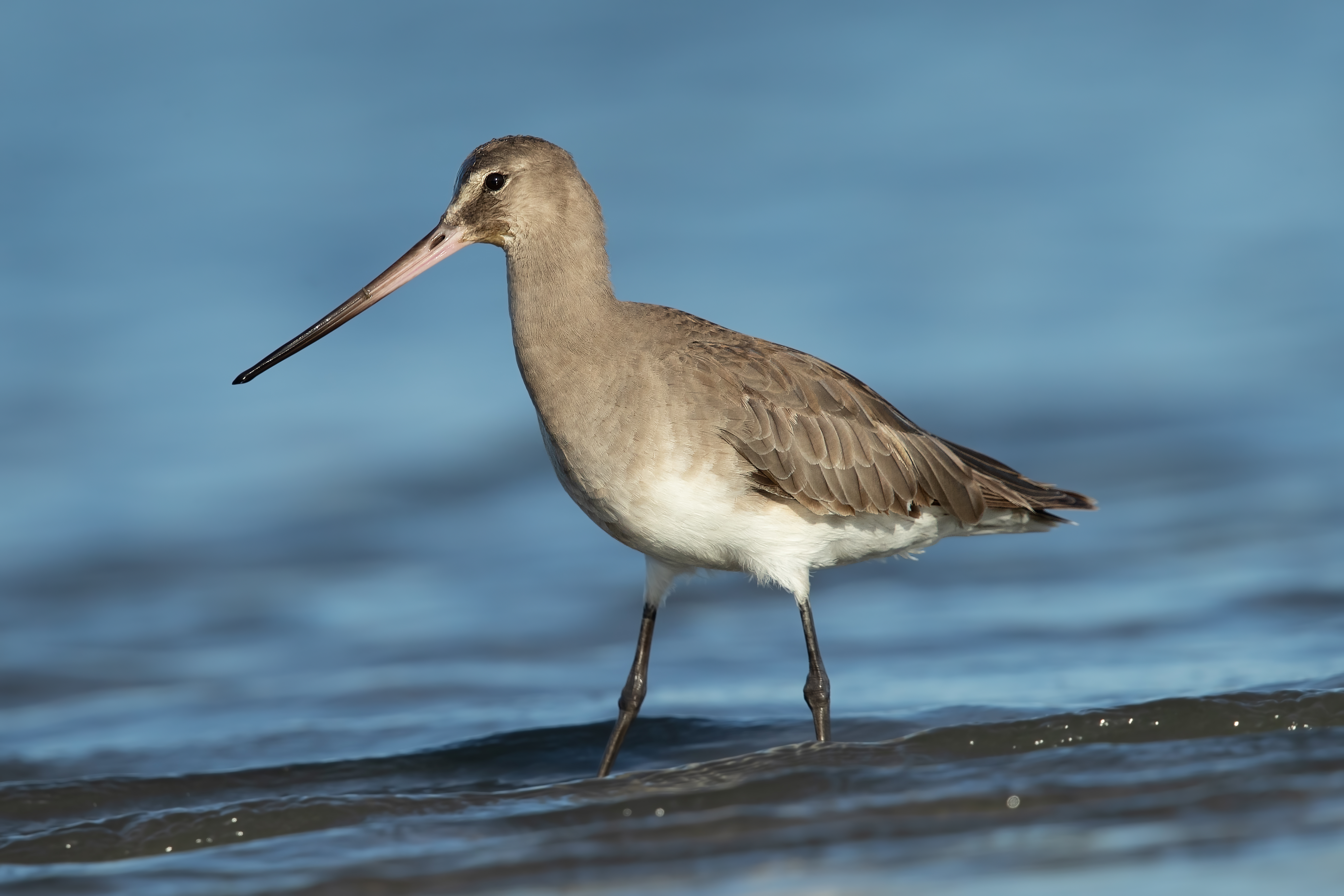
- A winter plumage vagrant at Kogarah Bay, Australia

Conservation status
- Vulnerable (IUCN 3.1)

Scientific classification
- Kingdom: Animalia
- Phylum: Chordata
- Class: Aves
- Order: Charadriiformes
- Family: Scolopacidae
- Genus: Limosa
- Species: L. haemastica

Binomial name
- Limosa haemastica (Linnaeus, 1758)

Synonyms
- Scolopax haemastica Linnaeus, 1758

= Hudsonian godwit =

Species of bird

The Hudsonian godwit (Limosa haemastica) is a large shorebird in the sandpiper family, Scolopacidae. It is an extreme long-distance migrant, breeding at remote sites in Subarctic North America and flying nonstop in the fall to wintering sites in southern South America. Due to its remote breeding and wintering grounds and rapid, direct migration, it was a poorly-known species and was considered very rare until the mid-20th century, when major staging sites were discovered around James Bay and breeding sites were found around Churchill, Manitoba. Since then, the Hudsonian godwit has become the target of conservation attention due to its fragmented and localized distribution and small population, as well as an important scientific system for migration biology research.

== Taxonomy and nomenclature ==
The Hudsonian godwit was formally described in 1758 by the Swedish naturalist Carl Linnaeus in the tenth edition of his Systema Naturae. He placed it in the genus Scolopax and coined the binomial name Scolopax haemastica. Linnaeus based his entry on the "red-breasted godwit" that had been described and illustrated in 1750 by the English naturalist George Edwards in the third volume of his A Natural History of Uncommon Birds. Edwards had obtained a specimen that had been collected in the Hudson Bay region of Canada by James Isham, an employee of the Hudson's Bay Company. Linnaeus specified the type locality as North America but this is restricted to the Hudson Bay following Edwards. The Hudsonian godwit is now one of four species placed in the genus Limosa that was introduced in 1760 by French zoologist Mathurin Jacques Brisson. The species is considered to be monotypic, with no subspecies being recognized. The genus name Limosa is from Latin and means "muddy", from limus, "mud". The specific epithet haemastica is from Ancient Greek haimatikos meaning "bloody". The English name "godwit" was first recorded in about 1416–17 and is believed to imitate the bird's call.

== Description ==
The Hudsonian godwit is a large, sexually dimorphic shorebird, with females (~250-360 g) generally heavier than males (~200-270 g). Structurally, like other godwits, Hudsonian godwits maintain an upright stance, with a longed, upwards-curved bill capable of rhynchokinesis and long, slender legs. The species exhibits a complex alternative moult strategy, with five distinct plumages; a juvenile plumage, a first-winter plumage, a first-summer plumage, an adult winter plumage, and an adult summer plumage; only the last of which is reliably different between the sexes.

Adults have long dark legs and a long pink bill with a slight upward curve and dark at the tip. The upper parts are mottled brown and the underparts are chestnut. The tail is black and the rump is white. They show black wing linings in flight. The legs and feet are bluish-grey.

Standard Measurements
length	37–42 cm (15–17 in)
wingspan	74 cm (29 in)
weight	300 g (11 oz)
wing	195.5–208.5 mm (7.70–8.21 in)
tail	70–83.8 mm (2.76–3.30 in)
culmen	68.2–81.2 mm (2.69–3.20 in)
tarsus	53.5–59.5 mm (2.11–2.34 in)

== Distribution and habitat ==
=== Breeding ===
The Hudsonian godwit breeds in a number of disjunct localities scattered across subarctic Canada and Alaska, ranging between the Bering Sea and Hudson Bay. Most breeding sites cluster into three primary areas:

- Western Alaska, including the Yukon–Kuskokwim Delta, along lower tributaries of the Yukon River such as the Koyukuk River, around Kotzebue Sound and Norton Sound, and in the Cook Inlet Basin
- The northern shore of the Northwest Territories, primarily in the Mackenzie River Delta and along the Anderson River
- Along the western shore of Hudson Bay, especially around Churchill, Manitoba and Polar Bear Provincial Park

Across all of these areas, Hudsonian godwits primarily breed at the interface between forests (usually dominated by spruce, dwarf birch, and willow) and wetlands, especially sedge meadows and sweet gale bogs.

=== Migration ===
Hudsonian godwits undertake a looped migration, with completely disjunct northbound and southbound migratory routes and behaviour; a rapid, direct southbound migration over the Atlantic, and a slower northbound migration with many stopovers through the interior of North America.

The southbound migration is preceded by massive staging (collective gathering and feeding) of each of the three major breeding populations between early July and early September. The most significant staging site for the Alaska population is at Aropuk Lake; the Northwest Territories population stages at the Quill Lakes and other saline wetlands in Saskatchewan; and the Hudson Bay population stages along James Bay. Although sightings during southbound migration away from these staging sites are uncommon, small numbers are seen annually in the The Maritimes and New England. On Cape Cod, hundreds of godwits are sometimes grounded during inclement weather in August. From these staging sites, Hudsonian godwits undertake nonstop flights over the Atlantic Ocean to their wintering sites in southern South America; at James Bay, birds typically commence their migratory flights in the mid-afternoon.

The northbound migration appears to be preceded by staging, peaking around March, at sites in southern Brazil, the Los Lagos Region of Chile, and around San Antonio Oeste and Buenos Aires in Argentina. Northbound migration through South and Central America is poorly understood, though godwits occur on the Pacific coast of Guatemala and both the Pacific coast of the Isthmus of Tehuantepec and along the Gulf of Mexico. Once godwits reach North America in April, migration is much more diffuse and less direct than in the spring, with birds using numerous stopover sites instead of flying directly to the breeding grounds. The primary northbound migratory movement through North America follows the Great Plains, with substantial numbers stopping at wetland complexes including Cheyenne Bottoms in Kansas, the Rainwater Basin in Nebraska, and Lake Thompson in South Dakota. Migration through interior North America has two peaks, one in mid-April, likely corresponding to Alaska-breeding birds, and a larger peak in May, representing the remainder of the population. As they pass through the Great Plains, Hudsonian godwits are flexible in their habitat preferences, using a variety of wet habitats ranging from rice fields and sewage ponds to more natural marshes and mudflats. Alaskan breeders arrive on their nesting grounds by early May; more easterly breeding birds, for example around Churchill, only arrive by late May.

=== Wintering ===
Hudsonian godwits from the eastern breeding populations winter almost exclusively on the Atlantic coast of the Southern Cone. Most of these birds, comprising over half of the global population of the species, winter on Tierra del Fuego, particularly along San Sebastián Bay and Bahía Lomas at the northeastern corner of the island. Some birds also winter further north in Argentina, particularly around Bahía Blanca and Cape San Antonio; some even winter inland at Mar Chiquita Lake. Meanwhile, the Alaskan breeding population winters almost exclusively on the Pacific coast of Chile, primarily around Chiloé Island and the Calbuco Archipelago. At all of these sites, godwits primarily use sheltered tidal mudflats, often near freshwater outflows.

=== Vagrancy ===
As with many other long-distance migratory shorebirds, the Hudsonian godwit is prone to vagrancy during the non-breeding season. They occur annually in New Zealand, where they are typically found among flocks of bar-tailed godwits; notably, both species co-occur in Western Alaska, implying that these vagrants may represent birds that have joined flocks of Bar-tailed godwits that undergo the record-holding 11,000-kilometre direct southbound migratory flight from Alaska to New Zealand. Hudsonian godwits are also recorded regularly in Australia and various Pacific Islands, and more rarely in Europe, where they have occurred at various times around the year.

== Behaviour and ecology ==
=== Breeding ===
Hudsonian godwits nest on the ground in a well-concealed location in a marshy area. The female usually lays four olive-buff eggs marked with darker splotches. Incubation period is 22 days. Both parents look after the young birds, which find their own food and are able to fly within a month of hatching.

=== Food and feeding ===
These birds forage by probing in shallow water. They eat invertebrates and plant material.

== Status ==
The species is classified as of Vulnerable by the International Union for Conservation of Nature.
