= College Area, Modesto, California =

College Area
- Neighborhood of Modesto
- Location in California Location in the United States
- Coordinates: 37.650141°N 121.009723°W
- Country: United States
- State: California
- County: Stanislaus
- City: Modesto
- ZIP Code: 95350
- Area code: 209

The College Area (also called the College Neighborhood) is a historic residential district in central Modesto, California, United States. The neighborhood lies north‑west of downtown and is roughly bounded by McHenry Avenue on the east, Tully Road on the west, Orangeburg Avenue on the north and Needham Street on the south. It is anchored by the Modesto Junior College (MJC) East Campus and is characterized by tree‑lined streets, early 20th‑century homes and public parks. The name comes from the area's association with Modesto Junior College and the fact that the naming of many streets in the area follows a famous university scheme.

== History ==
=== Origins and the women's improvement movement ===
Before the College Area was platted as a residential district, its southern end contained farmland owned by Charles Carner. In 1905 local developers Thomas K. Beard and T.J. Wisecarver acquired more than 80 acres from Carner’s estate with the aim of subdividing it and creating a public park. At the time Modesto had only a small park (a frog pond behind the county jail), prompting civic leaders and women’s clubs to push for more green space. In 1906 the Modesto Woman’s Improvement Club (WIC), led by Alice Dozier, was chartered with 46 members.

To raise money and public support, the club hosted fiestas and petitioned Beard and Wisecarver to donate land for a park. In September 1906 the men donated 10 acres for a public garden north of Needham Street; the WIC accepted the deed, and soon after attorney James Enslen donated additional land across the street. The women hired noted landscape architect John McLaren—designer of San Francisco’s Golden Gate Park—to draw up plans for the new park and surrounding subdivision, later known as the Wisecarver Addition. In choosing street names the WIC honored local leaders: Stoddard, Needham, Wright and Alice streets, and the new park was names Graceada, a portmanteau of the donors’ wives, Grace Beard and Ada Wisecarver. The park opened with a parade and dedication on 4 April 1907 and quickly became a focal point for the growing neighborhood.

=== Graceada and Enslen parks ===
Graceada Park is the oldest municipal park in Modesto. Designed by John McLaren, it originally featured strolling paths, tennis courts, an artificial lake and a rose arbor. The WIC maintained the park until 1913, when upkeep costs prompted its transfer to the city. Nearby Enslen Park was created from James Enslen’s donation and served as an extension of Graceada; it later hosted a small zoo and playground. Both parks became community hubs where band concerts, fairs and civic celebrations were held. In 1919 Professor William Higgins organized the Modesto Boys’ Band, which rehearsed in Graceada Park; after his death, conductor Frank Mancini took over and later founded the Modesto Symphony Orchestra. In 1949 the “MoBand Mothers” raised funds to construct the Mancini Bowl, an outdoor amphitheater in Graceada Park, which still hosts free summer concerts.

=== Trees in the college area ===
In 1927 park superintendent L.A. Rose identified a distinctive hybrid ash tree growing in West Side Park. Believing it to be a unique cross between valley ash and Arizona ash, he propagated the cultivar and sent cuttings to nurseries; horticulturist J.A. Briant dubbed it the “Modesto ash”. The tree proved hardy and fast‑growing and was planted throughout Modesto’s streets and parks; by the 1950s more than 15,000 Modesto ashes shaded the city. The original tree lived into its 90s, supported by steel braces, but succumbed to anthracnose and root rot in 2019; the city felled it after taking cuttings for cloning. The prevalence of Modesto ashes gives the College Area much of its leafy canopy today, as well as large sycamore trees.

=== Subdivision around MJC ===
Following the establishment of Modesto Junior College in 1921—the first community college district created under California’s Public Junior College Act—residential subdivisions proliferated around the campus, becoming part of what is now generally agreed to encompass the College Area. Streets laid out in the 1920s and 1930s were often named for landowners or their relatives. The McHenry Museum notes that Coldwell Avenue honors the Coldwell family; Morris Avenue and Lottie Street commemorate Major David W. Morris and his wife Charlotte; Myrtle Avenue was named after Mary Myrtle Dozier, and Olive Avenue after her friend Olive Almond. The same newsletter notes that later cul‑de‑sac streets—Valerie, Carla, Melinda and Helms—commemorate family members of developers Ralph Brown and Wilma McFarland; Valerie Brown Pierson was still living in 2025.

Roseburg Square at Roseburg and Virginia avenues grew out of the Ulrich Shopping Center built in 1962. The center attracted shoppers with a small zoo featuring Lulu the chimpanzee and other animals; after complaints and animal rights activism, the zoo closed in the early 1970s and the property was redeveloped into a landscaped shopping plaza.

== Location ==
The College Area is situated on Modesto’s west side near Dry Creek and the Virginia Corridor Trail. The neighborhood’s street plan is a grid of tree‑shaded avenues lined with bungalows, craftsman cottages and mid‑century ranch homes; it encompasses the Wisecarver Addition and later subdivisions. The College Area Neighborhood Alliance defines the neighborhood’s boundaries as McHenry Avenue, Tully Road, Orangeburg Avenue and Needham Street. The area code is 209, and the USPS postal ZIP Code is 95350.

The College Area contains some of Modesto’s oldest parks. Graceada Park offers playgrounds, picnic sites, tennis courts and the Mancini Bowl. The park’s grassy lawns date to John McLaren’s 1907 plan and were restored in the 2010s. Enslen Park across the street includes ball fields, basketball courts and a plaza dedicated in 2019 after the completion of a community splash pad and playground funded by local donors. Other nearby parks include Beyer Community Park, Downey Community Park, and Roosevelt Park.

The neighborhood is anchored by Modesto Junior College, one of California's oldest community colleges. Established in 1921, MJC initially held classes at Modesto High School until South Hall was completed in 1923; it now enrolls more than 25,000 students and offers a broad range of transfer and vocational programs. Nearby primary and secondary schools include Modesto High School, a historic Classical Revival campus built in 1921, and elementary schools within the Modesto City Schools district.

== Community and culture ==
The neighborhood is served by the College Area Neighborhood Alliance (CANA), a volunteer‑driven association formed in 2010 as part of Modesto’s strategic plan for community partnerships. CANA promotes beautification, safety and civic engagement and has spearheaded fundraising for park improvements. Residents gather for seasonal events such as the Modesto Certified Farmers Market held downtown and the Graffiti Summer car festival, which celebrates Modesto's car‑cruising culture and the film American Graffiti; the month‑long festival features street fairs, concerts and the American Graffiti Parade hosted by the North Modesto Kiwanis Club.

Music plays a central role in community life. MoBand—formerly the Modesto Band of Stanislaus County—has performed free summer concerts in Graceada Park since the 1920s; its volunteer musicians rehearse twice weekly and present Thursday night concerts in June and July. The band is open to all ages and skill levels, and its shows attract families with picnics and lawn chairs. The neighborhood also hosts holiday parades and block parties that highlight its diverse architecture and mature shade trees.

== Notable landmarks ==
- Graceada Park – Oldest municipal park in Modesto; features the Mancini Bowl, rose arbor and historic playground equipment.
- Enslen Park – Adjacent park with ball fields, basketball courts and a community plaza.
- Modesto ash – A unique ash cultivar discovered in 1927 that lines many of the neighborhood’s streets.
- Mancini Bowl – Outdoor amphitheater built in 1949 for the Modesto Band of Stanislaus County (MoBand).
- Roseburg Square – Shopping center at Roseburg and Virginia avenues; formerly the Ulrich Shopping Center which housed a zoo with Lulu the chimpanzee in the 1960s.
- Virginia Corridor Trail – Four‑mile linear park and trail along a former railroad line, connecting the neighborhood to northern Modesto.

== See also ==
- Downtown Modesto, Modesto, California
- La Loma, Modesto, California
- Graceada Park
- Modesto Junior College
