= Puerto Rico Highway 186 =

Highway in Puerto Rico

Highway 186
- Ruta 186

Route information
- Maintained by Puerto Rico DTPW
- Length: 26.9 km (16.7 mi)
- Existed: 1953–present

Major junctions
- South end: PR-185 in Hato Puerco
- PR-953 in Lomas; PR-907 in Lomas; PR-9948 in Lomas; PR-956 in Guzmán Arriba–Ciénaga Alta; PR-960 in Guzmán Arriba; PR-963 in Jiménez; PR-9960 in Guzmán Abajo; PR-9966 in Guzmán Abajo
- North end: PR-3 in Guzmán Abajo

Location
- Country: United States
- Territory: Puerto Rico
- Municipalities: Canóvanas, Río Grande

Highway system
- Roads in Puerto Rico; List
- Forest Highway System
← PR-185	→ PR-187

Puerto Rico Highway 186 (PR-186) is a road that travels from Canóvanas, Puerto Rico to Río Grande through the western side of El Yunque National Forest. This highway begins at PR-185 between Hato Puerco and Lomas barrios and ends at PR-3 in Guzmán Abajo.

Puerto Rico Highway 186 by municipality

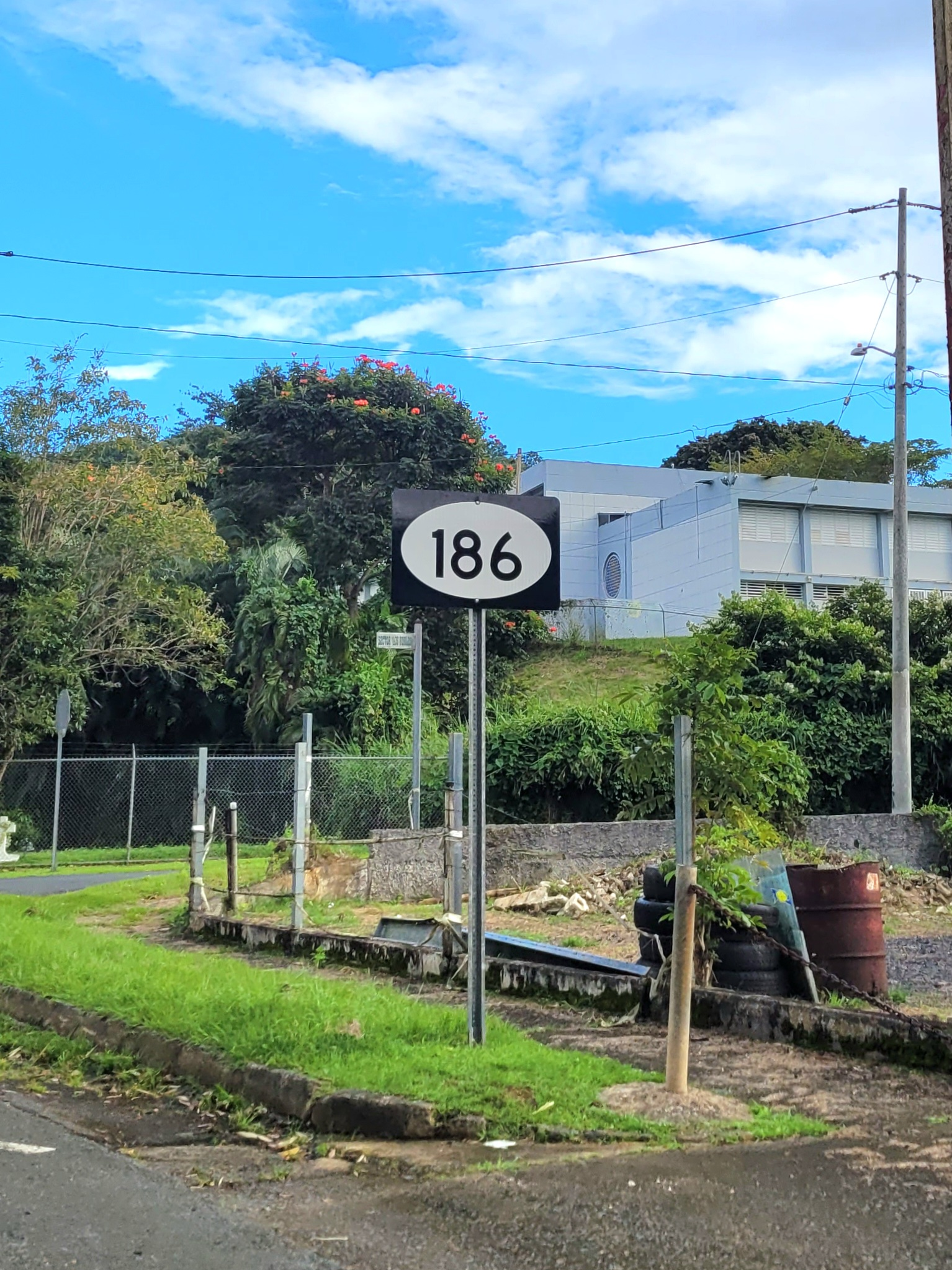
Northbound sign in Cubuy, Canóvanas

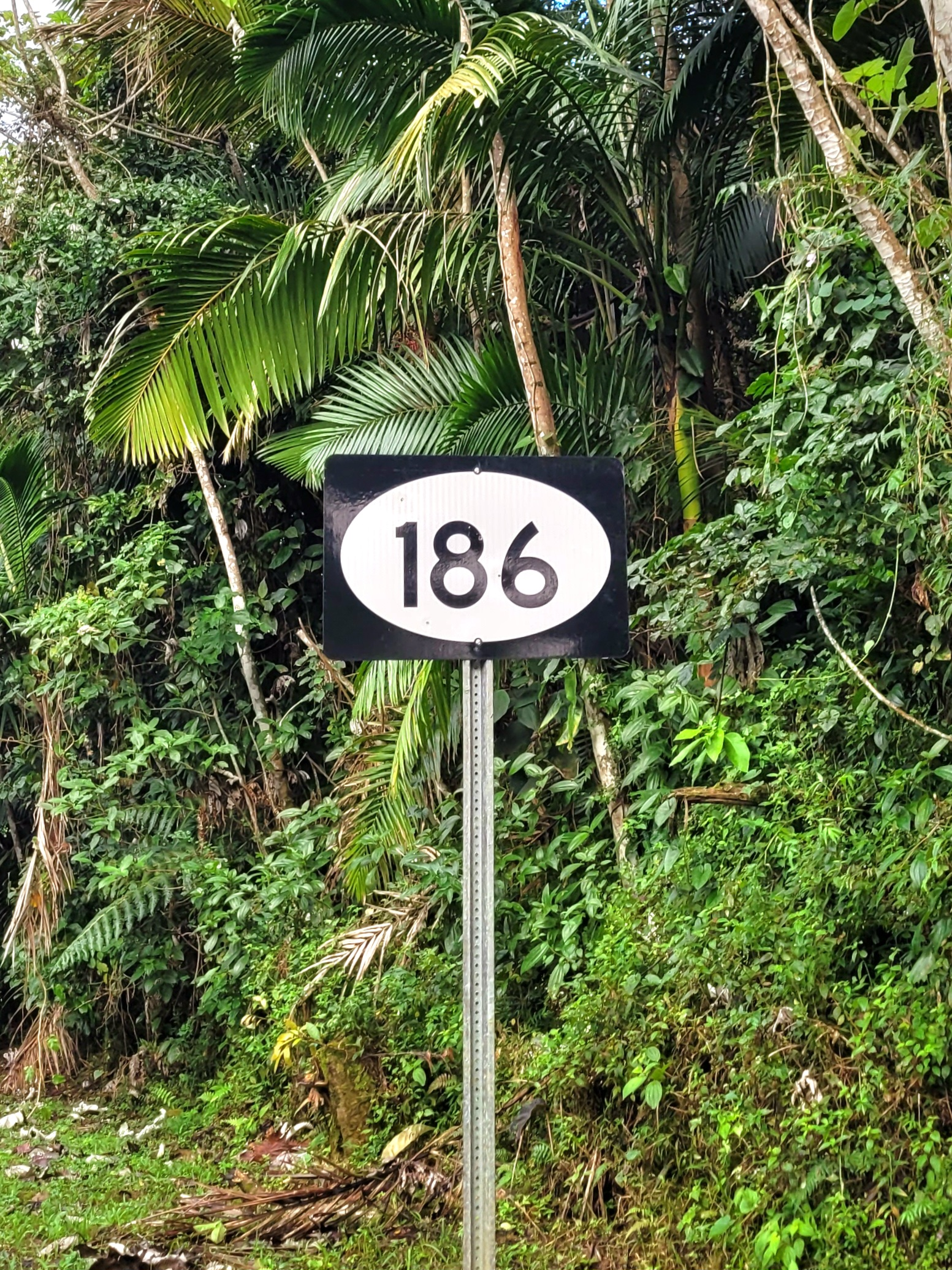
Northbound sign in Guzmán Arriba, Río Grande

== Major intersections ==
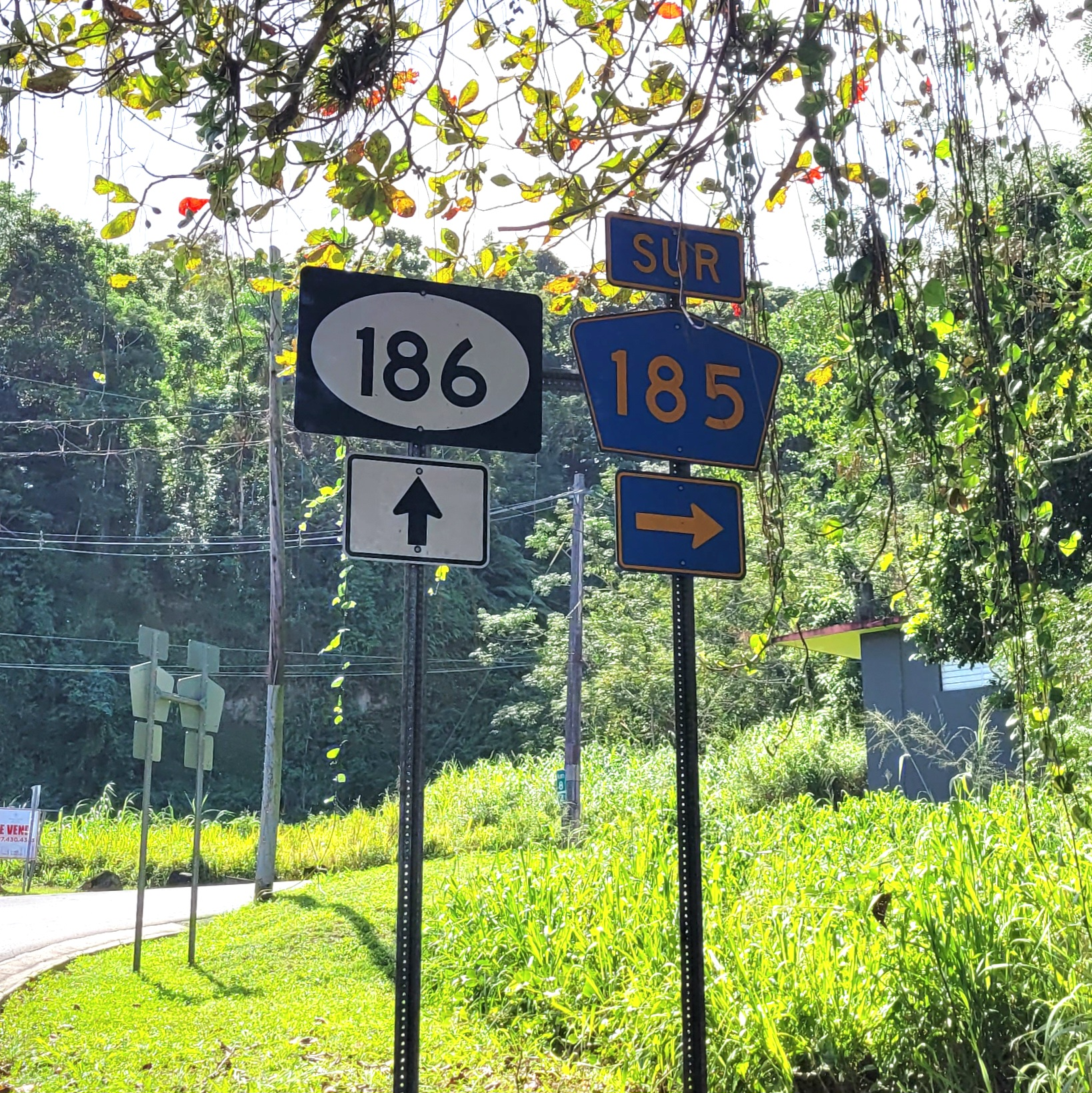
PR-185 south at PR-186 intersection in Canóvanas

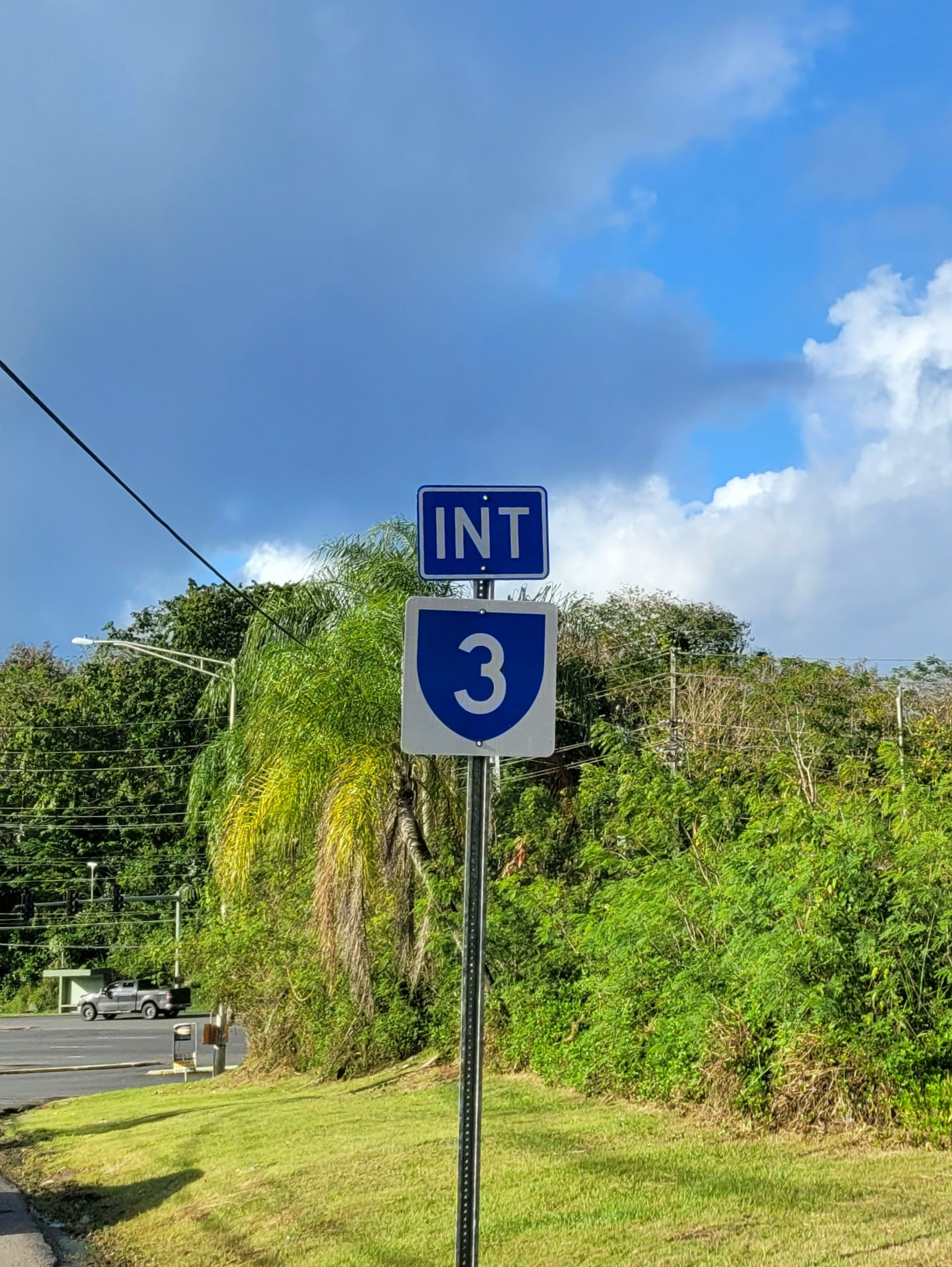
PR-186 north approaching PR-3 junction in Guzmán Abajo, Río Grande

Municipality	Location	km	mi	Destinations	Notes
Canóvanas	Hato Puerco	0.0	0.0	PR-185 – Canóvanas, Juncos	Southern terminus of PR-186
Canóvanas	Lomas	3.5	2.2	PR-953 – Lomas	
Canóvanas	Lomas	4.7	2.9	PR-907 – Ciénaga Alta	
Canóvanas	Lomas	7.4	4.6	PR-9948 – Lomas	
Canóvanas	Cubuy	10.7	6.6	El Yunque National Forest southern boundary	
Río Grande	Guzmán Arriba–Ciénaga Alta line	13.3	8.3	PR-956 – Guzmán Abajo	
Río Grande	Guzmán Arriba	17.0– 17.1	10.6– 10.6	PR-960 – Guzmán Abajo	
Río Grande	Jiménez	22.0	13.7	PR-963 – Jiménez	
Río Grande	Jiménez	22.1	13.7	El Yunque National Forest northern boundary	
Río Grande	Guzmán Abajo	24.0	14.9	PR-9960 – Bella Vista	
Río Grande	Guzmán Abajo	25.3	15.7	PR-9966 – Jiménez	El Yunque National Forest
Río Grande	Guzmán Abajo	26.9	16.7	PR-3 – San Juan, Fajardo	Northern terminus of PR-186
1.000 mi = 1.609 km; 1.000 km = 0.621 mi

== See also ==
- Forest highway
- 1953 Puerto Rico highway renumbering
