= Modesto Junior College =

Community college in Modesto, California, US

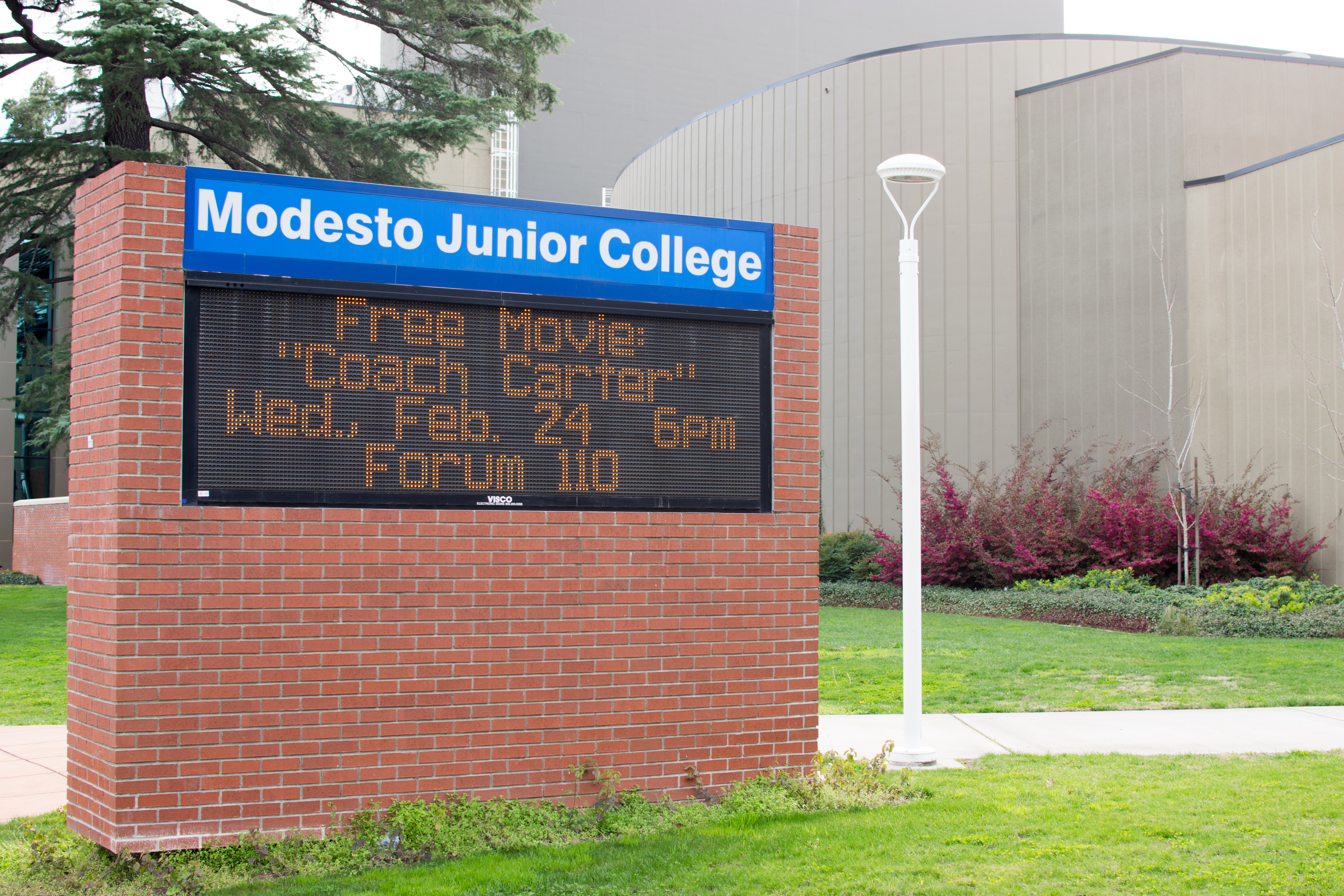
- Type: Public community college
- Established: 1921; 105 years ago
- Accreditation: ACCJC
- President: Brian Sanders
- Students: 19,262
- Location: Modesto, California, U.S. 37°39′N 121°00′W
- Colors: Blue and white
- Nickname: Pirates
- Sporting affiliations: California Community College Athletic Association (CCCAA) – Big 8 Conference
- Website: www.mjc.edu

The Morris Building houses administration departments.

Modesto Junior College (MJC) is a public community college in the College Area neighborhood of Modesto, California, United States. It is part of Yosemite Community College District along with Columbia College. MJC, and Columbia College, belong to the California Community College system along with 112 other public community colleges. The college has two campuses in Modesto. The East Campus is the original campus while the West Campus is the larger of the two. Courses are provided in general education, lower-division transfer programs, occupational and developmental education.

MJC is accredited by the Accrediting Commission for Community and Junior Colleges (ACCJC).

== History ==
Modesto Junior College can trace its roots to the decision by the California State Legislature in 1907 to authorize high schools to create "junior colleges" what were termed "postgraduate courses of study" similar to the courses offered in just the first two years of university studies.

Shortly after the decision by the legislature, Fresno City College was formed 96 miles south of Modesto. Due to the success of Fresno City College, the state legislature passed legislation in 1921 allowing for the creation of community college districts. Modesto Junior College, founded in September 1921, became the first community college district.

Modesto Junior College started out with only 61 students but has since expanded to over 19,000 students. In addition to enrollment increases, the school has expanded to having two campuses MJC West and MJC East, along with more than 20 community sites throughout the Yosemite College District that are used to meet particular education needs.

In 2015, it was announced that Modesto Junior College would become one of the first community colleges in California to offer Bachelor of Science degrees. The college offered a Bachelor of Science degree in respiratory care starting in 2017.

== Campus ==
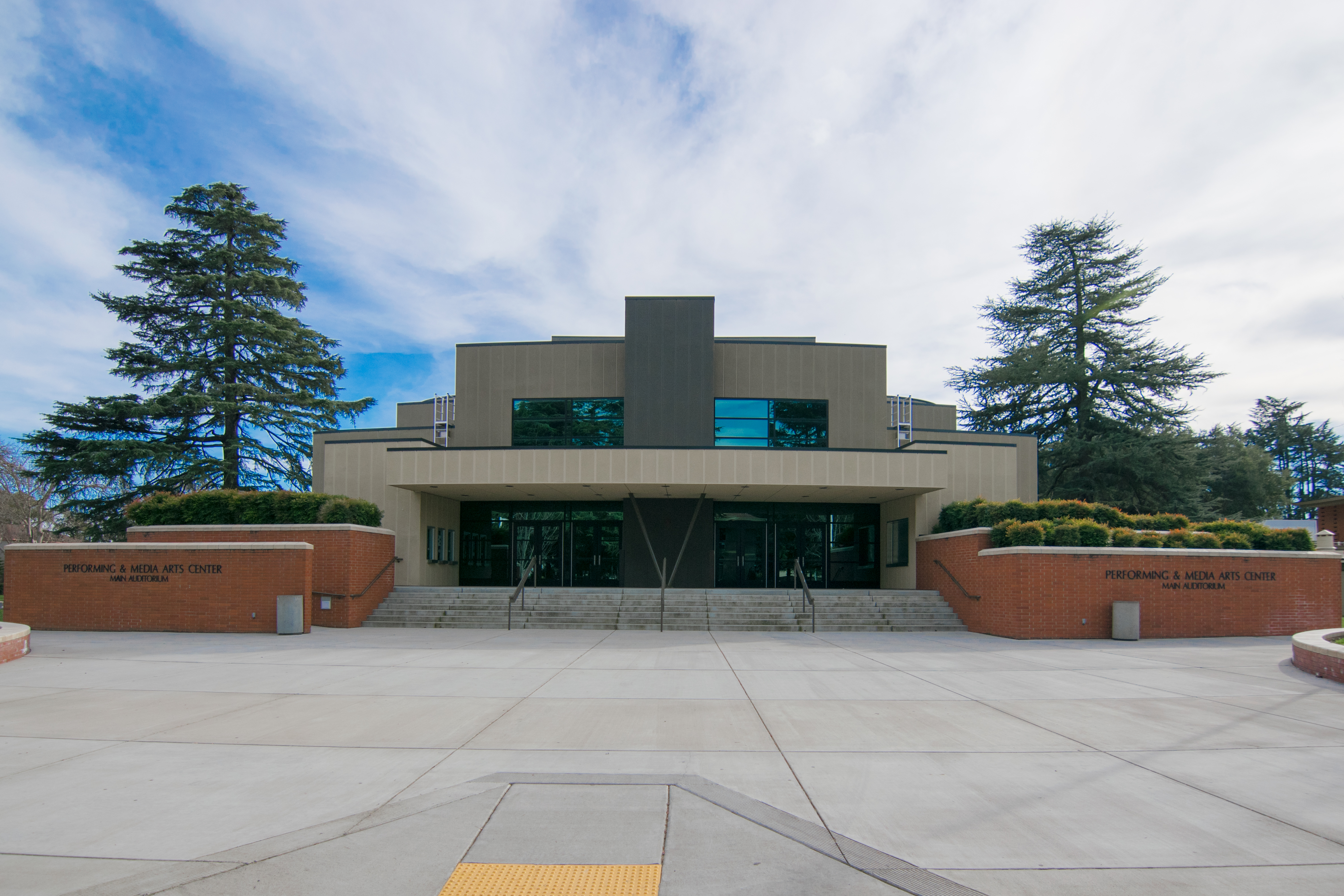
The entrance to the main auditorium of Modesto Junior College's Performing Arts Center

There are two Modesto Junior College campuses; MJC East and MJC West. MJC East is 58.3 arces and MJC West is 167.1 acres. Between both campuses, there are 6 large scale agricultural units, 7 (agriculture student) housing units, 74 buildings, 370 rooms including 15 athletic areas, 104 classrooms, 36 common use areas, 21 computer labs, 12 conference rooms, 99 lab classrooms, 16 lectures halls and 10 performance rooms.

== Administration ==
The college is part of the Yosemite Community College District within the California Community Colleges System. The current college president is Brian Sanders. The district is governed by an elected seven-member Board of Trustees.

== Academics ==
Modesto Junior College enrolls 19,262 students, and is accredited by the Western Association of Schools and Colleges.

Modesto Junior College provides over 88 associate degrees, 30 of which are of Agriculture alone. MJC is also home to an agricultural internship program in which students are given residence on West Campus. The school owns over 100 acres of various crops which it uses to teach the students theory of crop and animal sciences as well as give the students experience in the field.

== Student Government ==
The Associated Students of Modesto Junior College (ASMJC) is the official student government organization of Modesto Junior College. ASMJC represents the student body in participatory governance and advocates for student interests in academic, social, cultural, and political matters on campus.

ASMJC is governed by a Student Senate composed of up to five executive officers and eighteen student senators elected annually by the student body. The executive officers consist of the President, Vice President, Director of Political Development, Director of Student Relations, and Executive Secretary. The organization focuses on student advocacy and campus life events, with senators being required to complete an annual "Senator Project" which benefits the student body and campus community.

The organization also oversees the Inter-Club Council (ICC), which supports and coordinates student clubs and organizations at Modesto Junior College. ASMJC provides club development funding and appoints student representatives to college-wide and district-wide participatory governance committees.

Through Senator Projects and other initiatives, ASMJC has organized and funded cultural, educational, and basic-needs programs and events at MJC. The annual Hispanic Education Conference, African American Education Conference, Pride Education Conference, and Multicultural Day all originally developed as ASMJC-led Senator Projects. ASMJC also funds Free Lunch on Wednesdays (FLOW), which provides weekly meal tickets to students on campus.

== Athletics ==
Modesto Junior College is a member of CCCAA. Sports teams are nicknamed the MJC Pirates, and their colors are blue and white. MJC has the largest community college sports program in Northern California, with 21 sports: men's and women's basketball; men's and women's cross country; men's football; men's and women's golf; men's and women's soccer; women's softball; men's and women's swimming; men's and women's tennis; men's and women's track; women's volleyball; men's and women's water polo; and men's wrestling at the intercollegiate level.

== Notable people ==
- Oscar Zeta Acosta, Chicano activist, lawyer, and author
- René Ahumada (born 1935), Mexican Olympic sprinter
- Matt Bettencourt, PGA Tour golfer
- Shawn Boskie, Major League Baseball pitcher for the Chicago Cubs
- Robert O. Briggs, marching band director
- Gary Condit, served in the House of Representatives 1989–2003
- Hiram Fuller, professional basketball player
- Steve Gonzalez, American football player
- Lee Herrick, California Poet Laureate
- Howard Everest Hinton, fellow of the Royal Society, British entomologist, professor at the Natural History Museum, London and the University of Bristol
- Mustafa Johnson, football player.
- Dot-Marie Jones, track and field Olympian (competed as Dot Jones) and actress
- Ray Lankford, professional baseball player for the St. Louis Cardinals and San Diego Padres
- George Lucas, film director, screenwriter; created Star Wars and Indiana Jones. Also directed THX 1138 and American Graffiti.
- Keith Luuloa, professional baseball player
- Gino Marchetti, professional football player; defensive end for Baltimore Colts, NFL Hall of Famer
- Terance Marin, professional baseball player
- Jeff Moorad, former sports agent, owner of the San Diego Padres baseball team
- Roger Nixon, composer
- Ronald Oliveira, businessman and current CEO of Revolut USA
- Alex Olmedo, professional tennis player, Wimbledon champion (1959)
- Lindsay Pearce, actress
- Brandon Pettit, convicted or murdering his parents; was enrolled in the Fire Training Academy at Modesto Junior College
- Jeremy Renner, actor
- Justin Roiland, actor, animator, writer, producer, and director; co-creator of Rick and Morty
- Joe Rudi, professional baseball player (Oakland Athletics)
- John Soares, film director, actor, editor, and fight choreographer; directed Sockbaby
- Erick Threets, professional baseball player (San Francisco Giants)
- Bill Werle, professional baseball player
- Paul Wiggin, professional football player (Cleveland Browns) and coach (Stanford Cardinal and Kansas City Chiefs)
- Cy Young, 1952 Olympic gold medal, javelin
- Berk Brown, collegiate football player and coach
