= Burton (car) =

Dutch retro-style kit car

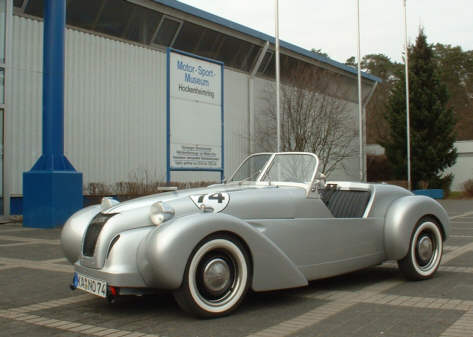
A Burton roadster at Motor-Sport-Museum Hockenheimring

The Burton is a Dutch kit car produced since 2000 by the Burton Car Company. It is a custom two-seater retro-style fiberglass body on a Citroën 2CV chassis and components, and can be built as an open roadster, a hardtop with gull-wing doors, or a custom convertible. Burton also imports and sells the Lomax in the Netherlands.

== History ==
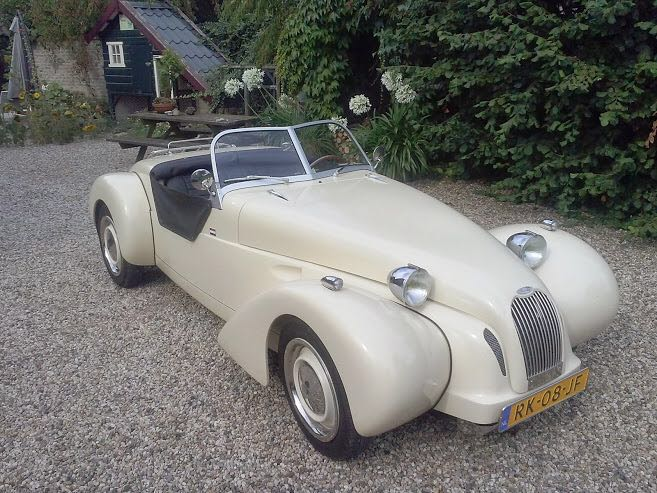
A homemade Burton roadster

The Burton Car Company was founded in 1993. Iwan and Dimitri Goebel designed the Burton in 1998, then codenamed "Hunter". It is loosely based on roadsters produced in the early-to-mid-20th century by automakers such as Bugatti, Jaguar, Talbot-Lago, Delahaye, and Alfa Romeo. After 18 months, the prototype was ready and on February 9, 2000, the first body was produced.

In May 2000, the Burton was released in the Netherlands, and in 2002 the Burton was made available for customers across Europe.

In 2019, the Burton Car Company and its subsidiary 2CV Parts went on sale for €5 million. In November 2022, the Burton Car Company was acquired by the French company 2CV Mehari Club Cassis, operating as a largely independent but cooperating organization.
