= Bahía Lomas, Dawson Island =

Small bay in Dawson island, Chile

Bahía Lomas
- Bahía Lomas (Spanish)
- Location within Southern Patagonia

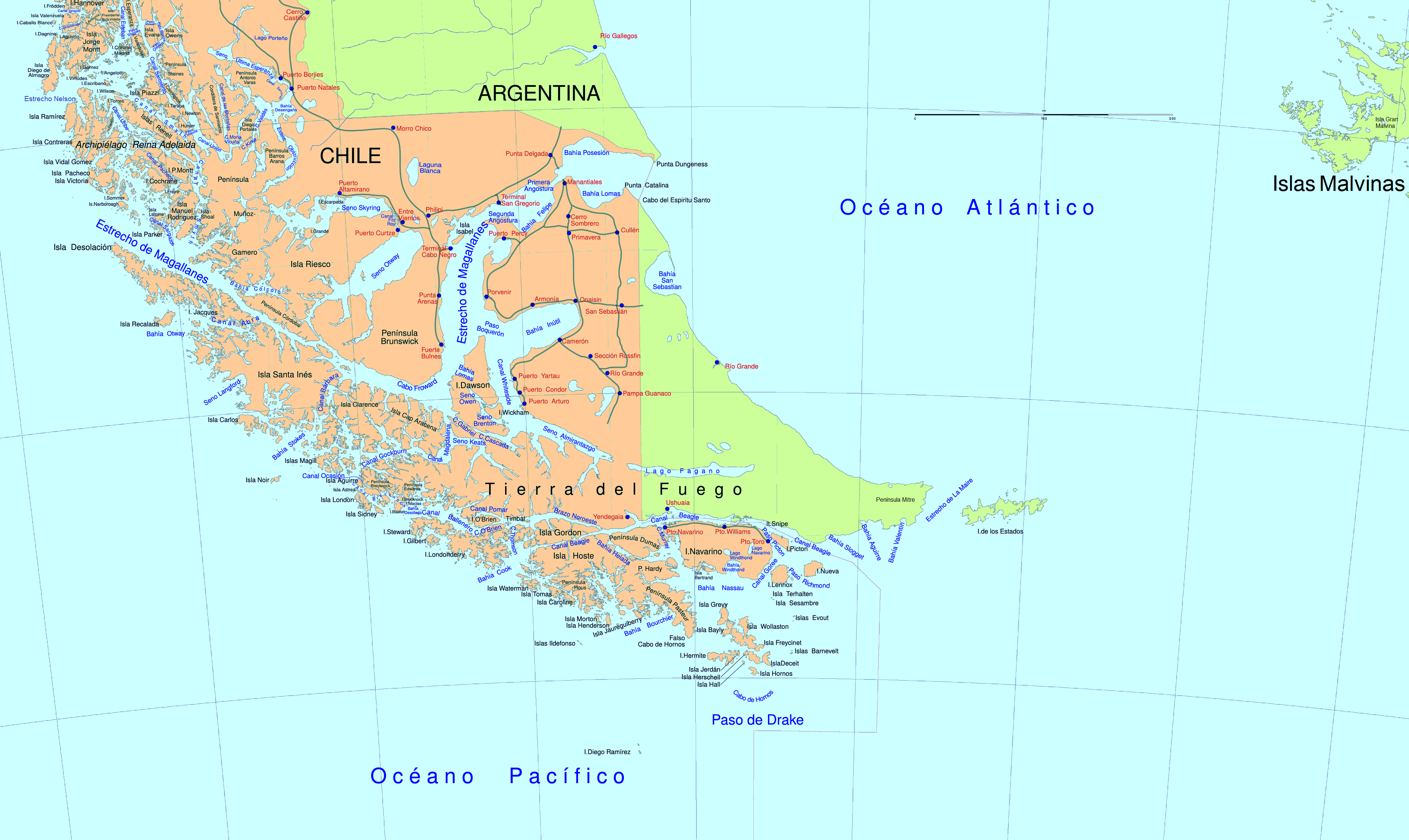
- Small bay off Dawson Island near Cape Froward
- Location: Magallanes Region, Chile
- Coordinates: 53°50′00″S 70°40′00″W
- Type: Bay
- Part of: Strait of Magellan
- Ocean/sea sources: South Pacific
- Max. length: 12 km (7.5 mi)
- Max. width: 6 km (3.7 mi)

Bahía Lomas (or Lomas Bay) is a small bay located on the western coast of Dawson island, Magallanes Region of Chile.

== Description ==
Bahía Lomas is a bay on the west of Dawson island near the southern tip of South America. The bay is located in southern part of Chile, inside the vast archipelago of Tierra del Fuego, and opens onto the Strait of Magellan. There is a larger bay nearby with the same name. This further complicates the location of the events of Ferdinand Magellan's expedition during his passage from the Atlantic to the Pacific Ocean.
