= Columbia College (California) =

Community college in Sonora, California

- Type: Public community college
- Established: 1968; 58 years ago
- Chancellor: Lena Tran
- President: Chad Redwing
- Students: 4,504
- Location: Sonora, California, United States; 38.030°N 120.388°W
- Mascot: Claim Jumpers
- Website: www.gocolumbia.edu

Columbia College is a public community college in Sonora, California. It was established in 1968. The college is part of the Yosemite Community College District and is accredited by the Accrediting Commission for Community and Junior Colleges (ACCJC).

The architectural style of the college is that of California during the Gold Rush era. The college has a fire department on campus that is staffed by an on duty crew of at least two personnel daily.

== History ==
In 1954, the district electorate decided to expand the former Modesto Junior College District into a larger area stretching out to the Yosemite Community College District. This is one of the largest districts in the state, geographically. It covers more than 100 miles of the San Joaquin Valley on the west to the Sierra Nevada on the east. Its area of almost 4,000 square miles includes Tuolumne, Stanislaus County, and areas from San Joaquin, Merced, Calaveras, and Santa Clara County.

Student enrollment was increasing and the need for more schools in these mountainous areas increased. The long-distance travel required for students to attend Modesto Junior College was very difficult. The high demand caused the Community College District Board of Trustees to authorize the formation of Columbia Junior College and its opening in 1968. In 1978, the school removed the word "Junior" from its name.

== Student Life ==
Student demographics as of Fall 2023
Race and ethnicity	Total
White	67%
Hispanic	23%
African American	3%
American Indian/Alaska Native	2%
Asian	2%
Unknown	2%
Filipino	1%
