= Yosemite Community College District =

Public community college district in California

Location
- Modesto, California; United States

District information
- Schools: Columbia College; Modesto Junior College

Other information
- Website: www.yosemite.edu

The Yosemite Community College District is a public community college district in Stanislaus County and Tuolumne County, California.

== Colleges ==
Colleges within the California Community Colleges System district include:

- Columbia College — located in Sonora, in the Sierra Nevada foothills
- Modesto Junior College — located in Modesto, in the central San Joaquin Valley.
