= Las Lomas =

Las Lomas may refer to:

== Places ==
=== United States ===
- Las Lomas, California, a census-designated place
- Las Lomas, Texas, a census-designated place
- Las Lomas (California), a mountain range

=== Other countries ===
- Las Lomas (Mexico City), a neighborhood of Mexico City
- Las Lomas, Chiriquí, Panama, a corregimiento (district subdivision)
- Las Lomas, Coclé, Panama, a corregimiento
- Las Lomas (Asunción), a neighborhood of Asunción, Paraguay
- Las Lomas District, Piura Province, Peru

== Other uses ==
- Las Lomas High School, Walnut Creek, California
- Las Lomas station, a rapid-transit station in San Juan agglomeration, Puerto Rico

== See also ==
- Lomas (disambiguation)
