= Lomas de Campos =

- Municipality and town
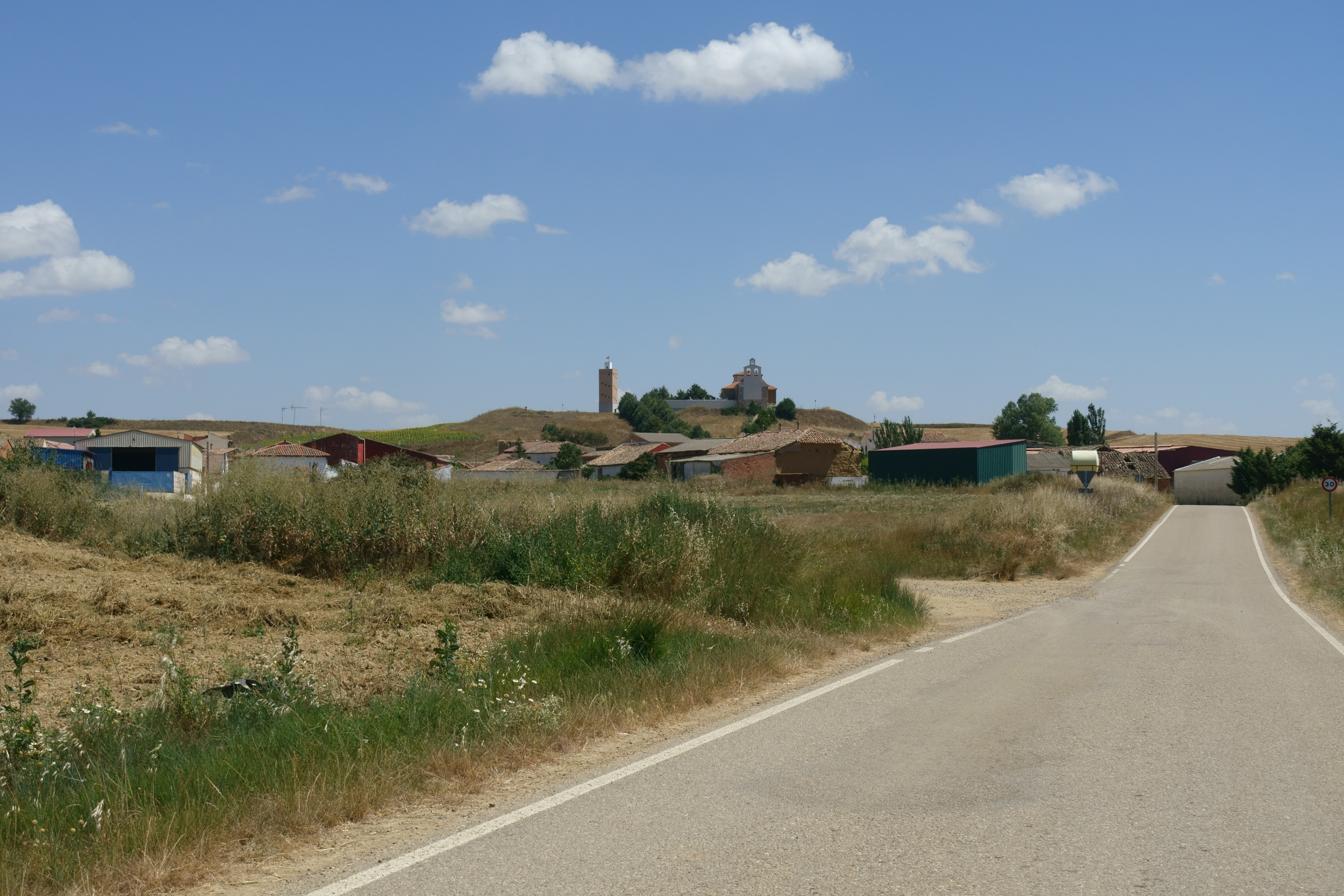

- Location in Spain
- Coordinates: 42°16′23″N 4°33′40″W
- Country: Spain
- Autonomous community: Castile and León
- Province: Palencia
- Comarca: Tierra de Campos

Area
  - Total: 17 km^{2} (6.6 sq mi)
- Elevation: 816 m (2,677 ft)

Population (2025-01-01)
  - Total: 40
  - Density: 2.4/km^{2} (6.1/sq mi)
- Time zone: UTC+1 (CET)
  - Summer (DST): UTC+2 (CEST)
- Postal code: 34449
- Website: Official website

Lomas de Campos is a municipality located in the province of Palencia, Castile and León, Spain. According to the 2014 census, the municipality has a population of 53 inhabitants.

== See also ==
- Tierra de Campos
