= Aropuk Lake =

Lake in the state of Alaska, United States

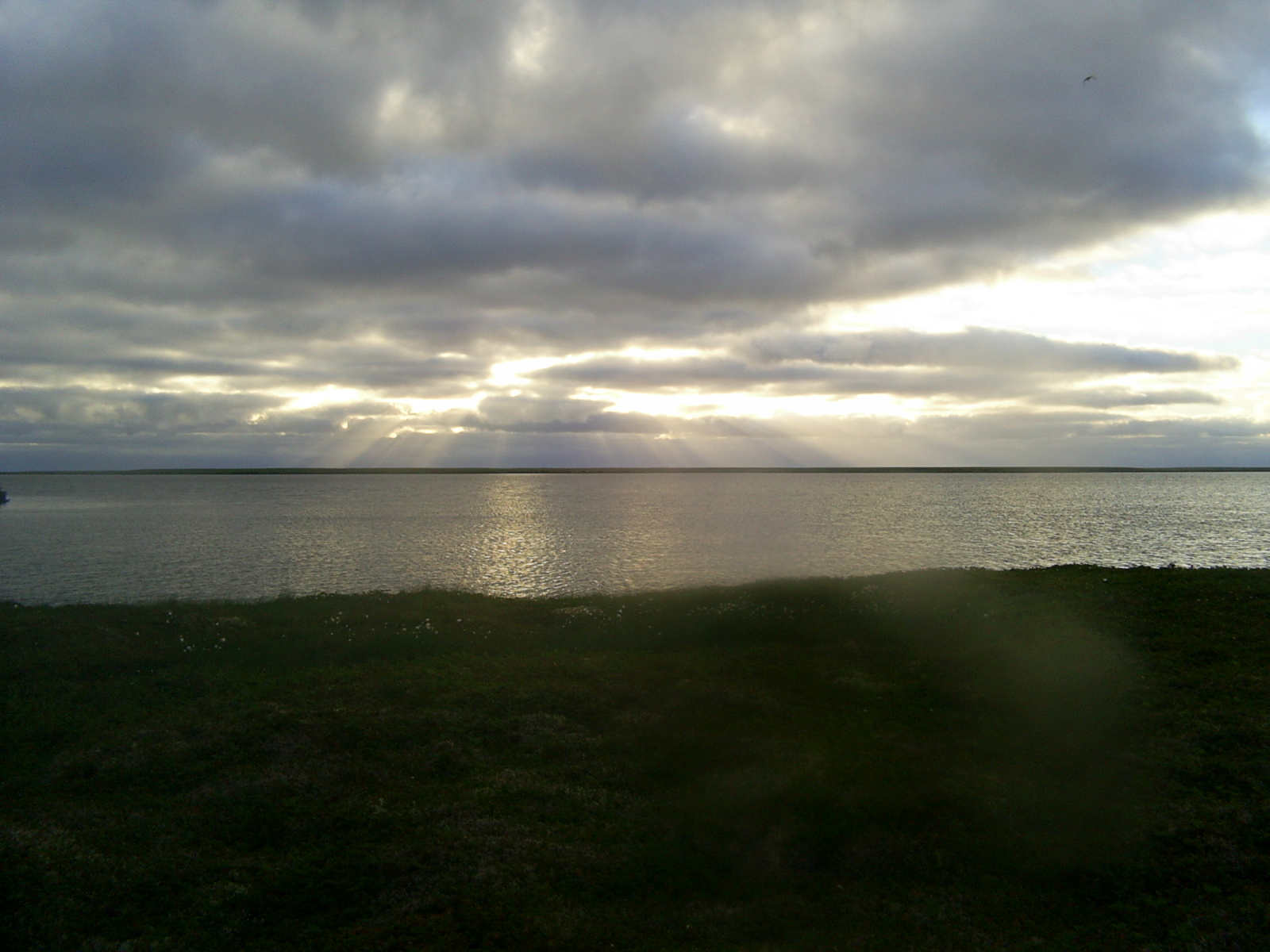

- Location within Alaska
- Location: Bethel Census Area, Alaska
- Coordinates: 61°09′43″N 163°47′39″W
- Basin countries: United States
- Max. length: 15 mi (24 km)

Aropuk Lake is a 15-mile-long (24-kilometer) lake in the U.S. state of Alaska, located 15 miles (24 km) north of Baird Inlet.
