= La Loma, New Mexico =

La Loma
- Unincorporated community
- Location within the state of New Mexico La Loma (the United States)
- Coordinates: 35°37′10″N 105°55′50″W
- Country: United States
- State: New Mexico
- County: Santa Fe
- Elevation: 7,100 ft (2,200 m)
- Time zone: UTC-7 (Mountain (MST))
  - Summer (DST): UTC-6 (MDT)
- ZIP codes: 87724
- Area code: 505
- GNIS feature ID: 918221

La Loma is an unincorporated community located in Santa Fe County, New Mexico, United States. The community is 4.5 miles (7.2 km) south of downtown Santa Fe. La Loma had its own post office from March 24, 1942, to September 10, 2011; it still has its own ZIP code, 87724.
