= Las Lomas (California) =

- Location within California

Highest point
- Elevation: 151 m (495 ft)

Geography
- Country: United States
- State: California
- District: Kings County
- Range coordinates: 35°47′47.854″N 119°54′58.483″W
- Topo map: USGS Avenal Gap

The Las Lomas are a mountain range in Kings County, California.
