= Jack Lomax =

Jack or Jackie Lomax may refer to:

- Jack Lomax, character in Hellfighters (film)
- Jack Lomax, on Ex On The Beach
- Jackie Lomax, John Lomax

== See also ==
- John Lomax (disambiguation)
