= La Loma, Coclé =

La Loma
- Location within Panama
- Coordinates: 8°10′12″N 80°37′48″W
- Country: Panama
- Province: Coclé

Population (2008)
  - Total: 1 844

La Loma is a town in the Coclé Province of Panama.

== Sources ==
- World Gazeteer: Panama – World-Gazetteer.com
