= César de Loma =

Spanish footballer (born 1975)

Personal information
- Full name: César de Loma Atienza
- Date of birth: 14 July 1975 (age 51)
- Place of birth: Spain
- Position: Midfielder

Senior career*
Years	Team	Apps	(Gls)
1993–1995	Atlético Madrid B	60	(9)
1995–1996	Levante	30	(9)
1996–1997	Almería	32	(1)
1997–1999	Atlético Madrid B	67	(3)
1999–2000	Boavista	3	(0)
2000	→ Mérida (loan)	20	(1)
2000–2003	Betis	31	(1)
2003	Córdoba		
2004	Ciudad de Murcia		
- * Club domestic league appearances and goals

César de Loma Atienza (born 14 July 1975) is a Spanish former footballer who played as a midfielder.

== Early life ==
De Loma Atienza was born in 1975 in Spain. He started playing football at the age of seven.

== Career ==
De Loma Atienza started his career with Spanish side Atlético Madrid B. In 1995, he signed for Spanish side Levante. In 1996, he signed for Spanish side Almería. In 1997, he returned to Spanish side Atlético Madrid B. In 1999, he signed for Portuguese side Boavista. In 2000, he was sent on loan to Spanish side Mérida. In 2000, he signed for Spanish side Betis. In 2003, he signed for Spanish side Córdoba. In 2024, he signed for Spanish side Ciudad de Murcia.

== Style of play ==
De Loma Atienza mainly operated as a midfielder. He was known for his versatility.

== Personal life ==
De Loma Atienza is a native of Madrid, Spain. He was in a relationship with Spanish model Carmen Janeiro.
