= La Loma Bridge =

Bridge in Pasadena, California, US

- U.S. National Register of Historic Places
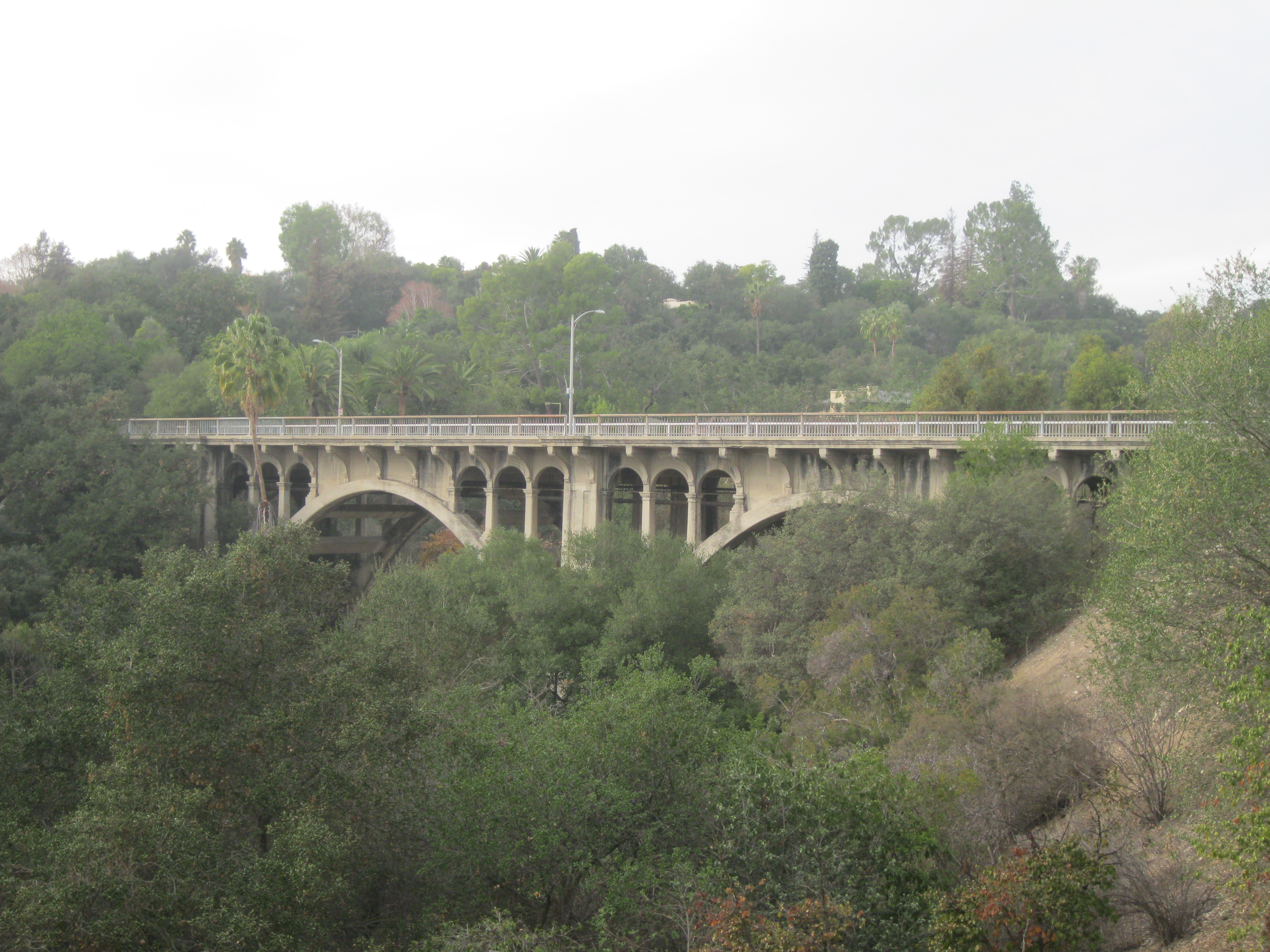
- Side view of the bridge

- Location within the Los Angeles metropolitan area Location within California Location within the United States
- Location: Crossing the Arroyo Seco at La Loma Broad, Pasadena, California
- Coordinates: 34°8′3″N 118°10′1″W
- Area: less than one acre
- Built: 1914
- Built by: Munoz and Munoz
- Architect: Los Angeles County Surveyor
- Architectural style: Classical Revival
- MPS: Early Automobile-Related Properties in Pasadena MPS
- NRHP reference No.: 04000680
- Added to NRHP: July 14, 2004

The La Loma Bridge is a bridge that carries La Loma Road across the Arroyo Seco, located in Pasadena, California.

== History ==
Built in 1914, the bridge replaced the 1898 California Street Bridge, which had closed the prior year due to safety concerns. The open spandrel concrete arch bridge has a Neoclassical design inspired by the City Beautiful movement. The bridge's design is reminiscent of Pasadena's Colorado Street Bridge, which was built a year earlier. La Loma Bridge has been called the "little sister" of it, and for the first several years of their existence, the two bridges were the only crossings of the Arroyo Seco in Pasadena.

The La Loma Bridge played a significant role in the development of Pasadena west of the Arroyo, particularly in the San Rafael Heights area, which Pasadena annexed at the same time it constructed the bridge.

The bridge was added to the National Register of Historic Places on July 14, 2004.

The bridge was closed for renovation in July 2015, and reopened on June 24, 2017, with a dedication to former California Attorney General John van de Kamp, a Pasadena native who died on March 14 of that year.

== See also ==
- National Register of Historic Places listings in Pasadena, California
- Bridges on the National Register of Historic Places in California

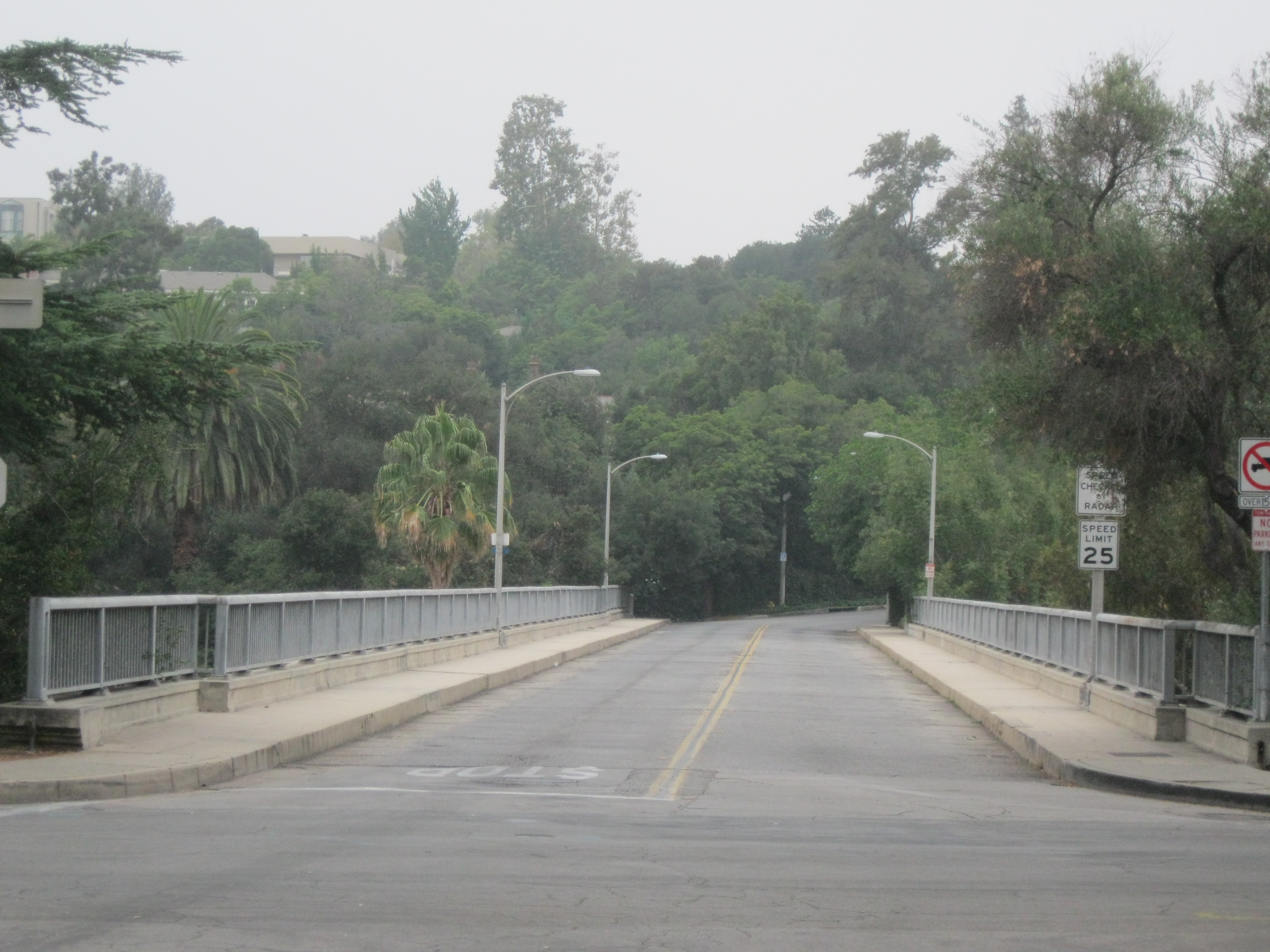
La Loma Road crossing the Arroyo Seco on the La Loma Bridge.
