= John Lomax (disambiguation) =

John Lomax (1867–1948) was an American teacher, musicologist and folklorist.

John Lomax may also refer to:

- John Lomax Jr. (1907–1974), folklorist, performer, and land developer
- John Lomax (rugby league) (born 1966), New Zealand rugby league player
- John Tayloe Lomax (1781–1862), American jurist
- Jackie Lomax (John Richard Lomax, 1944–2013), English guitarist and singer-songwriter
- John Lomax (diplomat) (1896–1987), British diplomat

== See also ==
- Jack Lomax (disambiguation)
