= Lomax (kit car) =

British retro-style kit car

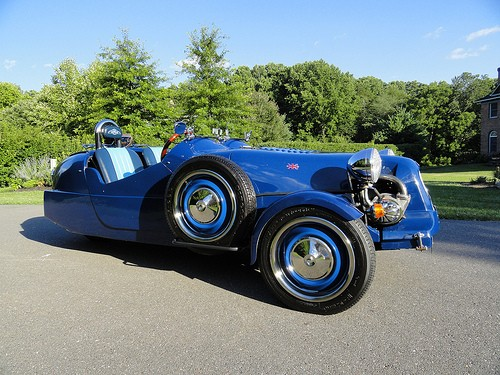
Lomax 223

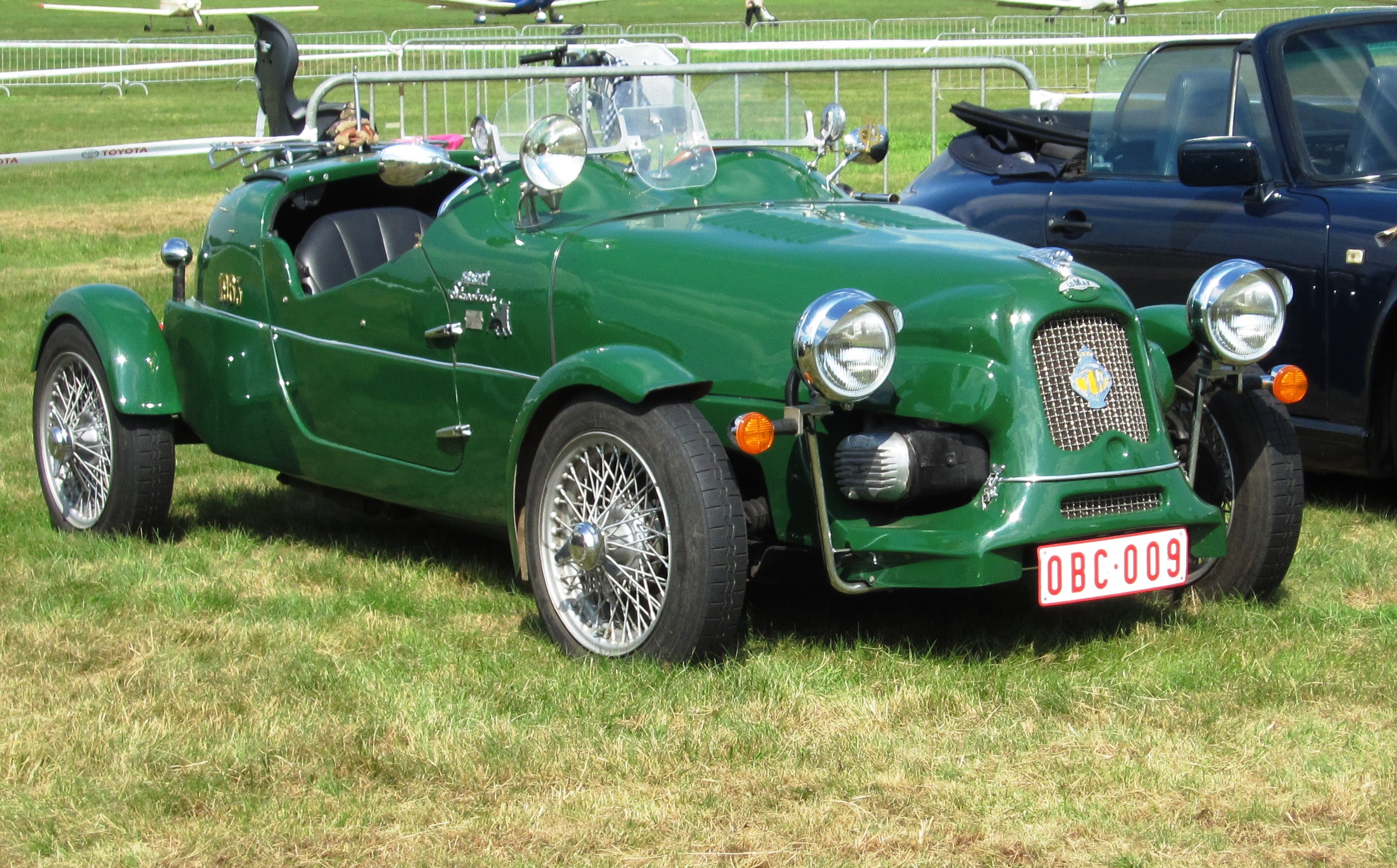
Lomax 224

The Lomax is a British kit car produced since 1982 by several companies. It is a custom two-seater retro-style fibreglass body on a Citroën 2CV or Citroën Dyane chassis and components, and is available in three-wheeler and four-wheeler designs.

== History ==
The Lomax was introduced in 1982 by the Lomax Motor Co. of Willoughton, Gainsborough, Lincolnshire. It was designed by Nigel Whall.

In the late 1980s production was transferred to the Mumford Motor Co. of Gigg Mill, Nailsworth, Gloucestershire, where it was produced until the early 1990s. From then it was built at Cradley Motor Works in Cradley Heath, West Midlands. By 2009 the car was still being produced by Cradley Motor Works in St Leonards-on-Sea, East Sussex.

Since the early 1990s the Lomax has been sold in the Netherlands and Germany.

== Design ==
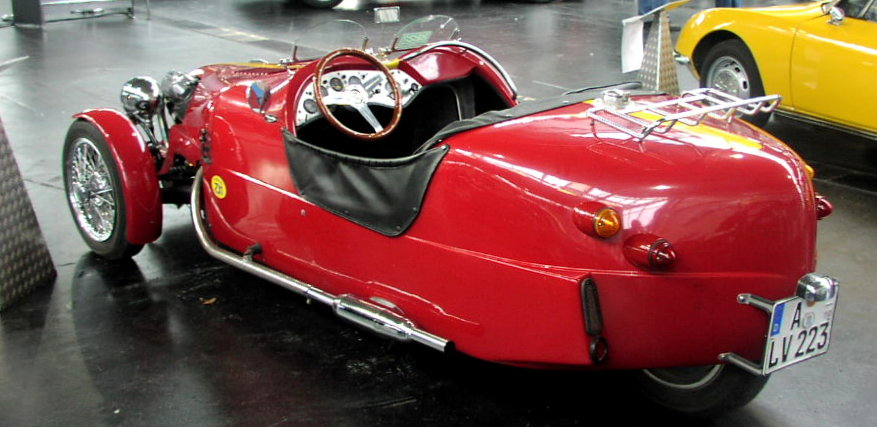
Lomax 223

The design is slightly reminiscent of the better-known Morgan Three Wheeler of the 1930s. The car consists of a fibreglass body mounted on an un-modified Citroën 2CV or Dyane floorpan and engine. Later a steel tube chassis was introduced. A Lomax is usually an open two-seat roadster.

The original 1982 prototype had a bespoke four-wheel chassis which was specially constructed, and of shorter wheelbase than the donor car, a Citroën Ami. Early "three-wheeler" variants were actually four-wheelers, with two rear wheels closely paired as in some Heinkel bubble cars of the 1960s. Later versions were genuine trikes, three wheels with two wheels in front and one at the back, this allowed to benefit from the (lower) 3-wheel UK road-tax. A four-wheel variant followed later, using an unmodified 2CV chassis.

The naming convention was the number of cylinders, the number of seats, and the number of wheels. The common model designations are 223 (2 cylinders, 2 seats, 3 wheels) or 224 (2 cylinders, 2 seats, 4 wheels). A few examples used the engine from the Citroën GS or GSA, designated 424 (4 cylinders, 2 seats, 4 wheels).

The Lomax weighs approximately 430 kilograms (950 lb), delivering a top speed of approximately 140 kilometres per hour (87 mph) with a 602cc 2CV/Dyane engine. Petrol consumption is 4 L/100 km (71 mpg_{‑imp}; 59 mpg_{‑US})-6 L/100 km (47 mpg_{‑imp}; 39 mpg_{‑US}).

== Variants ==
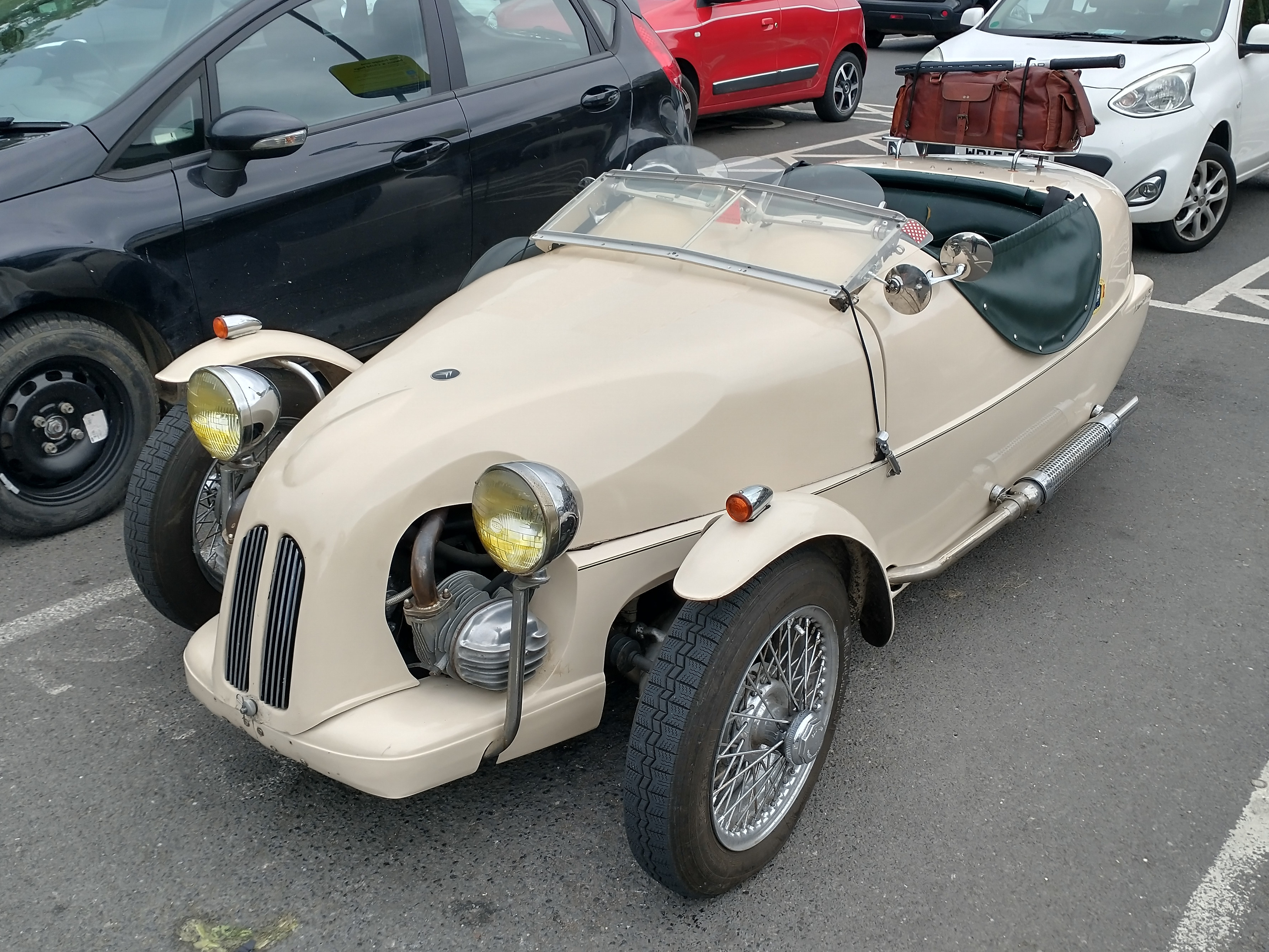
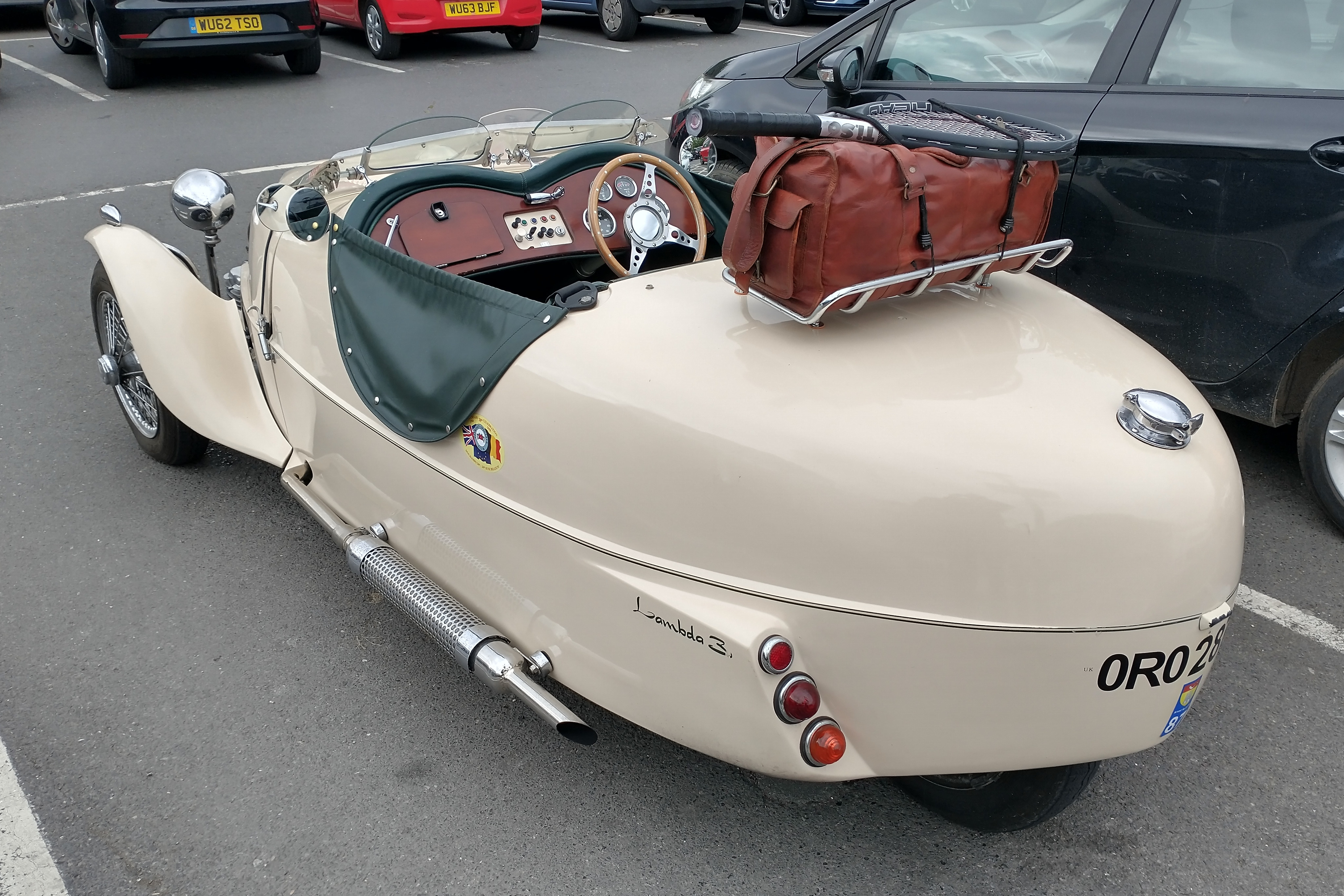
Lomax Lambda 3

The major variants of the Lomax are:

- Lomax 223: Three-wheeler
- Lomax 224: Four-wheeler
- Lomax Lambda 3/4: Redesigned rounder versions of the 223 and 224 respectively
- Lomax Supertourer: Four-wheeler resembling a 1930s touring car, retaining the 2CV's cooling fan and heat exchanger instead of the simple air cooling of other models

== See also ==
- Burton (car)
