= Tom Lomax =

English sculptor and painter (born 1945)

Tom Lomax (born 1945) is an English painter and sculptor. He has created many public sculptures by commission, which stand in locations in Britain.

== Life ==
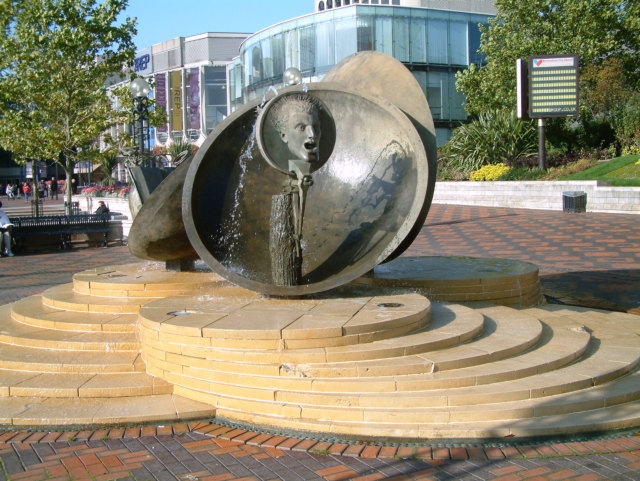
"Spirit of Enterprise", with the Repertory Theatre behind, in Birmingham

Lomax was born in Warrington. He studied painting at the Central School of Art and Design and at the Slade School of Fine Art. He was a part-time tutor at the Slade from 1982; during this time, sculpture became his main interest. He retired from teaching in 2010.

== Works ==
Lomax's works include the following:

"Spirit of Enterprise", in Centenary Square, Birmingham, is a bronze sculpture featuring a fountain. There are three bowls: the bowl facing west, towards the Hall of Memory, is based on a classical portrait; Enterprise, facing north, leaps from its bowl; the composite head in the third bowl, facing the International Convention Centre, represents many nationalities, relating to the multi-ethnicity of Birmingham.

The "Walsall Saddle" is a bronze sculpture in Bradford Street, Walsall, commissioned by Walsall Metropolitan Borough Council and unveiled in 2000. A saddle, bearing drawings of saddlery themes, is supported by a giant hand.

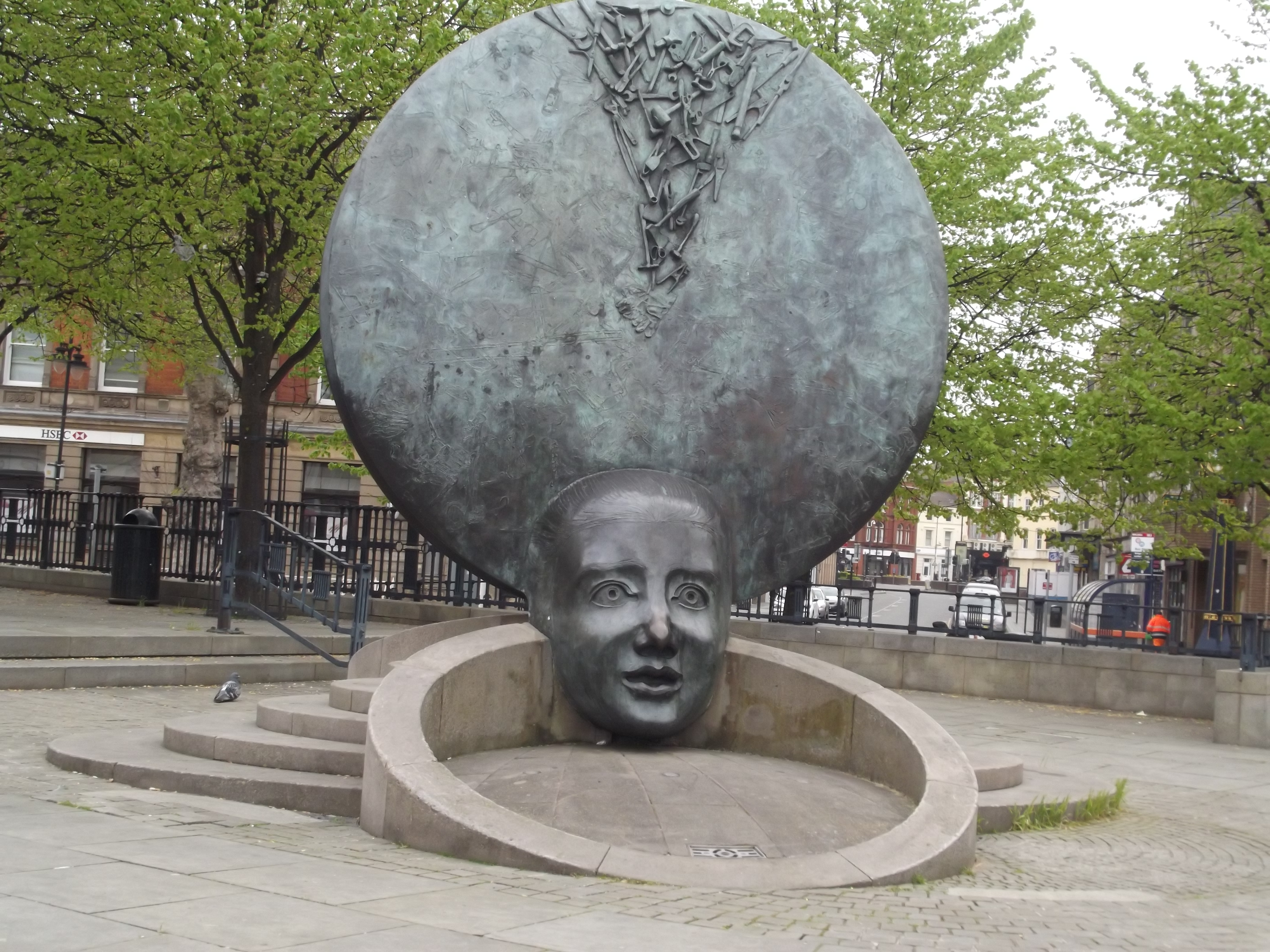
"Source of Ingenuity", in Walsall

"Source of Ingenuity" is a sculpture of bronze and concrete, height 3 metres (9.8 ft), in The Bridge, Walsall. It was commissioned by Walsall Metropolitan Borough Council and was unveiled on 20 July 2001, on the occasion of the opening of a civic square. There are two discs back-to-back, decorated with traditional tools on one and symbols of technology on the other; the face of Janus is at the base of each. At the ceremony, Lomax said to the crowd: "I hope you come to enjoy the Source. But it may take a while to get used to it.... You’ve got to keep coming back to learn more about it".

"Nombelisk" is a sculpture of bronze and copper, height 10 metres (33 ft), in Bradford Street, Walsall. It was commissioned by Walsall Metropolitan Borough Council, and was unveiled in 2001. It is lined with every surname of families who have lived in Walsall since the 13th century.

"Out of the Cauldron", created by 3D printing, was produced in 2016 for the UCL Institute for Sustainable Heritage, specifically for research into preserving modern art for the future, since it was found that materials used in 3D printing degrade rapidly. Lomax said: "As an artist I previously had little idea of the conservation threat facing contemporary art... But while working on this project with UCL I began to realise that artists themselves have a crucial role to play."
