= Lomas, Canóvanas, Puerto Rico =

Barrio of Puerto Rico

Lomas
- Barrio
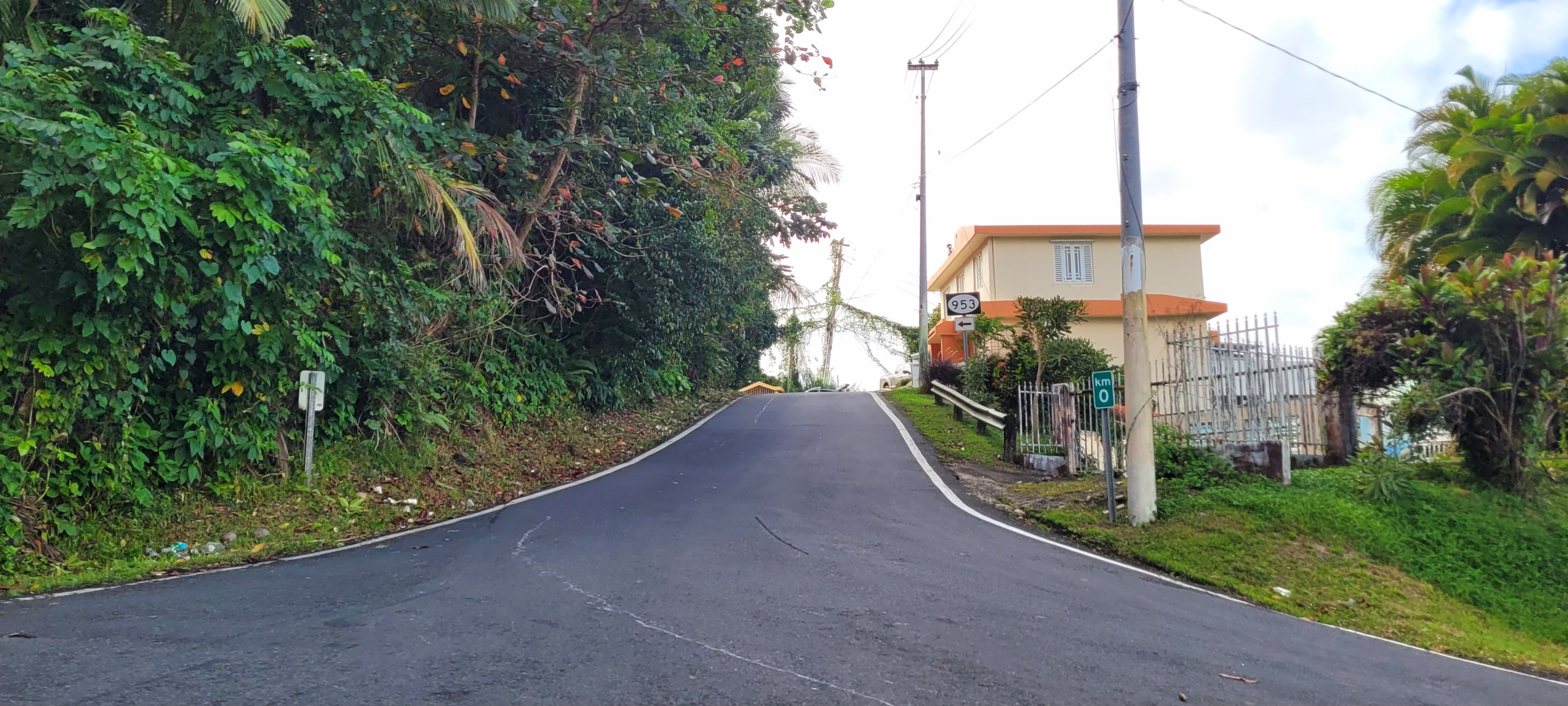
- Puerto Rico Highway 953 in Lomas

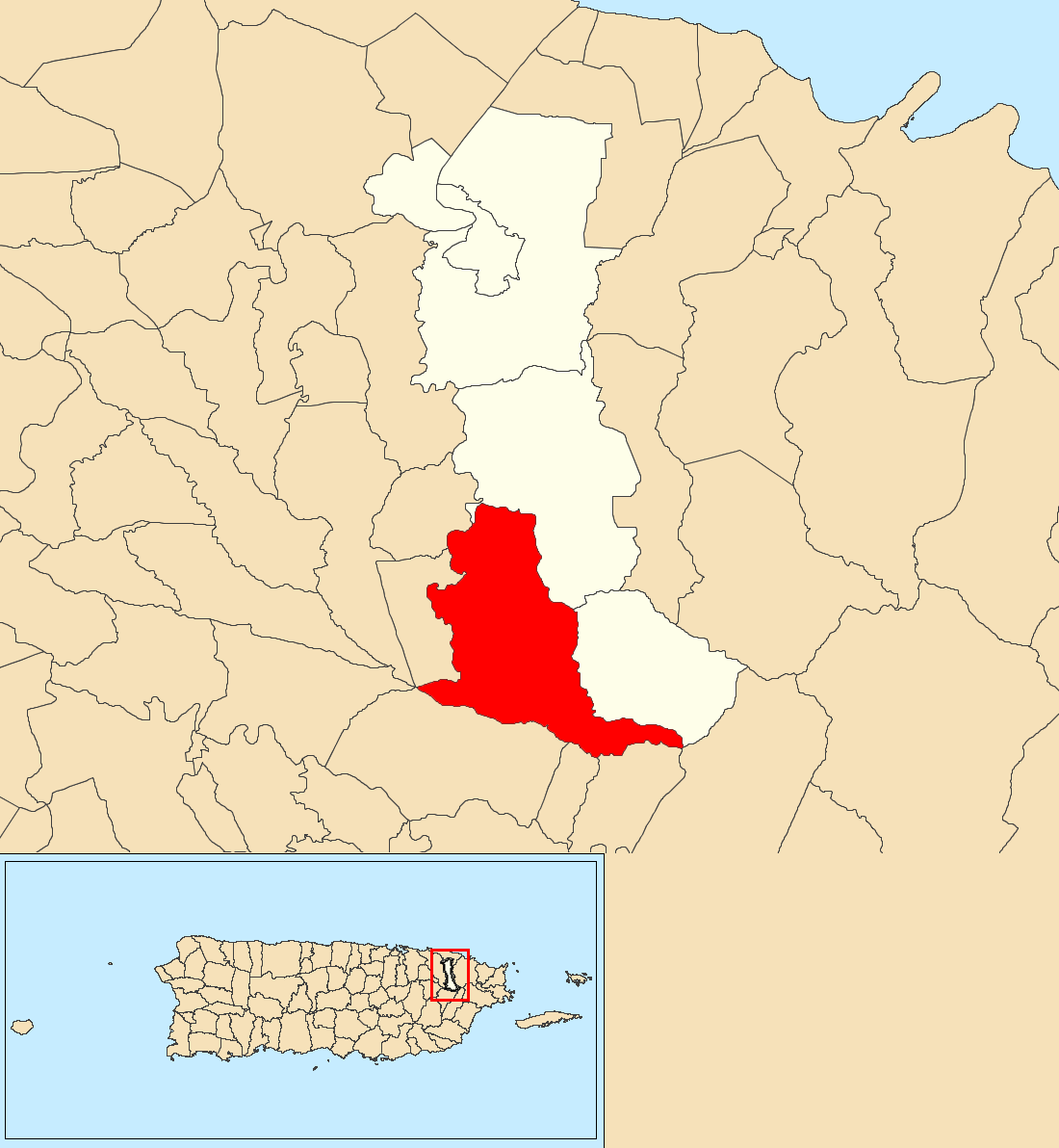
- Location of Lomas within the municipality of Canóvanas shown in red

- Location of Puerto Rico
- Coordinates: 18°16′54″N 65°53′34″W
- Commonwealth: Puerto Rico
- Municipality: Canóvanas

Area
  - Total: 7.39 sq mi (19.1 km^{2})
  - Land: 7.39 sq mi (19.1 km^{2})
  - Water: 0.00 sq mi (0 km^{2})
- Elevation: 889 ft (271 m)

Population (2010)
  - Total: 5,336
  - Density: 722.1/sq mi (278.8/km^{2})
- Source: 2010 Census
- Time zone: UTC−4 (AST)

Lomas is a barrio in the municipality of Canóvanas, Puerto Rico. Its population in 2010 was 5,336.

Historical population
Census	Pop.	Note	%±
1940	1,844		—
1950	2,434		32.0%
1960	2,760		13.4%
1970	4,020		45.7%
1980	4,627		15.1%
1990	5,124		10.7%
2000	5,402		5.4%
2010	5,336		−1.2%
U.S. Decennial Census; 1899 (shown as 1900) 1910-1930; 1930-1950 1980-2000 2010

== Sectors ==
Barrios (which are, in contemporary times, roughly comparable to minor civil divisions) in turn are further subdivided into smaller local populated place areas/units called sectores (sectors in English). The types of sectores may vary, from normally sector to urbanización to reparto to barriada to residencial, among others.

The following sectors are in Lomas barrio:

Parcelas Las Cuatrocientas, Sector Las Yayas, Sector Lomas Cole, Sector Los Casillas, Sector Los Fortis, Sector Los González, Sector Martín Rodríguez, and Sector Quebrada Prieta.

== See also ==
- List of communities in Puerto Rico
- List of barrios and sectors of Canóvanas, Puerto Rico
