= Lomas (surname) =

Lomas is a territorial surname of English origin, derived from the hamlet of Lumhalghs, near Bury, Greater Manchester, and meaning "pool nook or recess". Notable people with the surname include:

== Arts and entertainment ==
- Andy Lomas (born 1967), British digital artist
- Carmen Lomas Garza (born 1948), Mexican American artist
- Herbert Lomas (actor) (1887–1931), British actor
- Herbert Lomas (poet) (1924–2011), British poet and translator
- James Lomas (actor) (born 1990), English stage actor
- Jamie Lomas (born 1975), English actor
- Kym Lomas (born 1976), English actress and former singer
- Samuel Lomas (died 1793), English clockmaker
- Stanley Lomas (1913–2003), American television producer

== Politics ==
- Alf Lomas (1928–2021), British politician
- Kenneth Lomas (1922–2000), British Labour Party politician

== Sport ==
- Anne Lomas (born 1953), New Zealand lawn bowls competitor
- Arthur Lomas (1895–1924), New Zealand cricketer
- Bill Lomas (1928–2007), British motorcycle racer
- Billy Lomas (1885–1976), British footballer
- Bryan Nickson Lomas (born 1990), Malaysian diver
- Claire Lomas (born 1980), British campaigner, fundraiser and former event rider
- Harry Lomas (born 1903, date of death unknown), English amateur footballer
- James Lomas (rugby league) (1879–1960), English rugby league footballer
- Jamie Lomas (footballer) (born 1977), English footballer
- John Lomas (cricketer) (1917–1945), English cricketer
- Jonathan Lomas (born 1968), English golfer
- Lisa Lomas (born 1967), British table tennis player
- Mark Lomas (born 1948), American football defensive lineman
- Mark Lomas (cricketer) (born 1970), English cricketer
- Steve Lomas (born 1974), Northern Irish professional football player
- Tony Lomas (born 1945), British former motorcycle speedway rider

== Other ==
- John Lomas (trade unionist) (1848–1933), New Zealand coalminer, trade unionist and public servant
- Jonathan Lomas (researcher) (born 1952), British-Canadian health researcher
- J. Keith Lomas, British businessman
- Robert Lomas (born 1947), British writer on Freemasonry and academic
