= La Loma, Modesto, California =

Coordinates: 37.6432°N 120.9717°W

La Loma
- Neighborhood
- Interactive map of La Loma
- Country: United States
- State: California
- County: Stanislaus
- City: Modesto

Government
- Elevation: 97 ft (30 m)
- Time zone: UTC-8 (PST)
  - Summer (DST): UTC-7 (PDT)
- Area code: 209
- Website: Official website

La Loma is a neighborhood in central Modesto, California. The earliest accounts of La Loma attribute to a small settlement called "Ripperdan" that flourished in 1871, until its demise in the 1900s. The neighborhood was named after La Loma Avenue that diagonally intersects the area. The name la loma means "the hill" in Spanish. Other Spanish names located in the neighborhood are El Río, La Sombra, Buenavista, Bonita, Cuesta, Las Flores, Santa Rosa, Roble, Las Palmas, and Escuelita.

This area is recognized by the City of Modesto as a neighborhood within city limits, named La Loma Neighborhood.
