= Bahía Lomas =

Bay in the eastern mouth of the Strait of Magellan in Chile

Designations

Ramsar Wetland
- Official name: Bahía Lomas
- Designated: 6 December 2004
- Reference no.: 1430

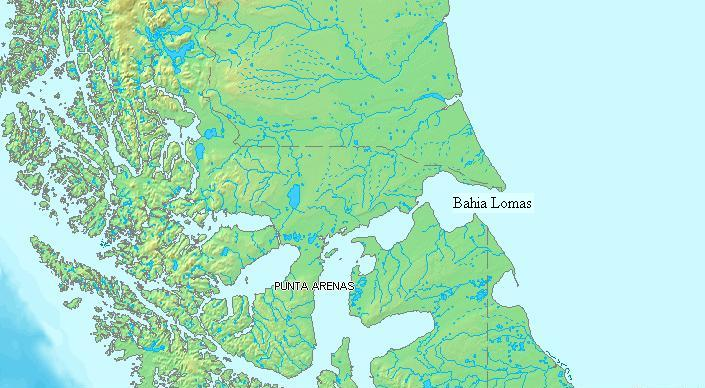

Bahia Lomas (or Lomas Bay) is a bay in the eastern mouth of the Strait of Magellan in Southern Chile, on the north coast of the Isla Grande de Tierra del Fuego. The area is a large tidal plain, with a tidal variation up to 7 km. The wetlands of the bay are important sites for the red knot, the Hudsonian godwit and other shorebirds. The wetlands are a Ramsar site of international importance and an Important Bird Area.

== Geography ==
Bahía Lomas is a bay on the north of the island of Tierra del Fuego near the southern tip of South America. The bay is located in Chile, close to the border with Argentina at 52.55°S and 69.00°W, and opens onto the Strait of Magellan. The bay has about 69 km (43 mi) of beach, a number of salt marshes and the largest area of tidal flats in Chile. Up to 7 km (4 mi) of flats are exposed by the receding tide, measuring from the high tide mark to low water. Above the high tide mark are muddy plains criss-crossed by channels, and these are backed by sandy areas. This part of Tierra del Fuego experiences sudden changes in the weather and strong winds throughout the year; in the summer (December to March), the temperature averages between 6 and 12 °C (43 and 54 °F) while in the winter (June to August) the mean temperature can drop below −1 °C (30 °F). Two oil extraction platforms are situated on the flats.

== Ramsar site ==
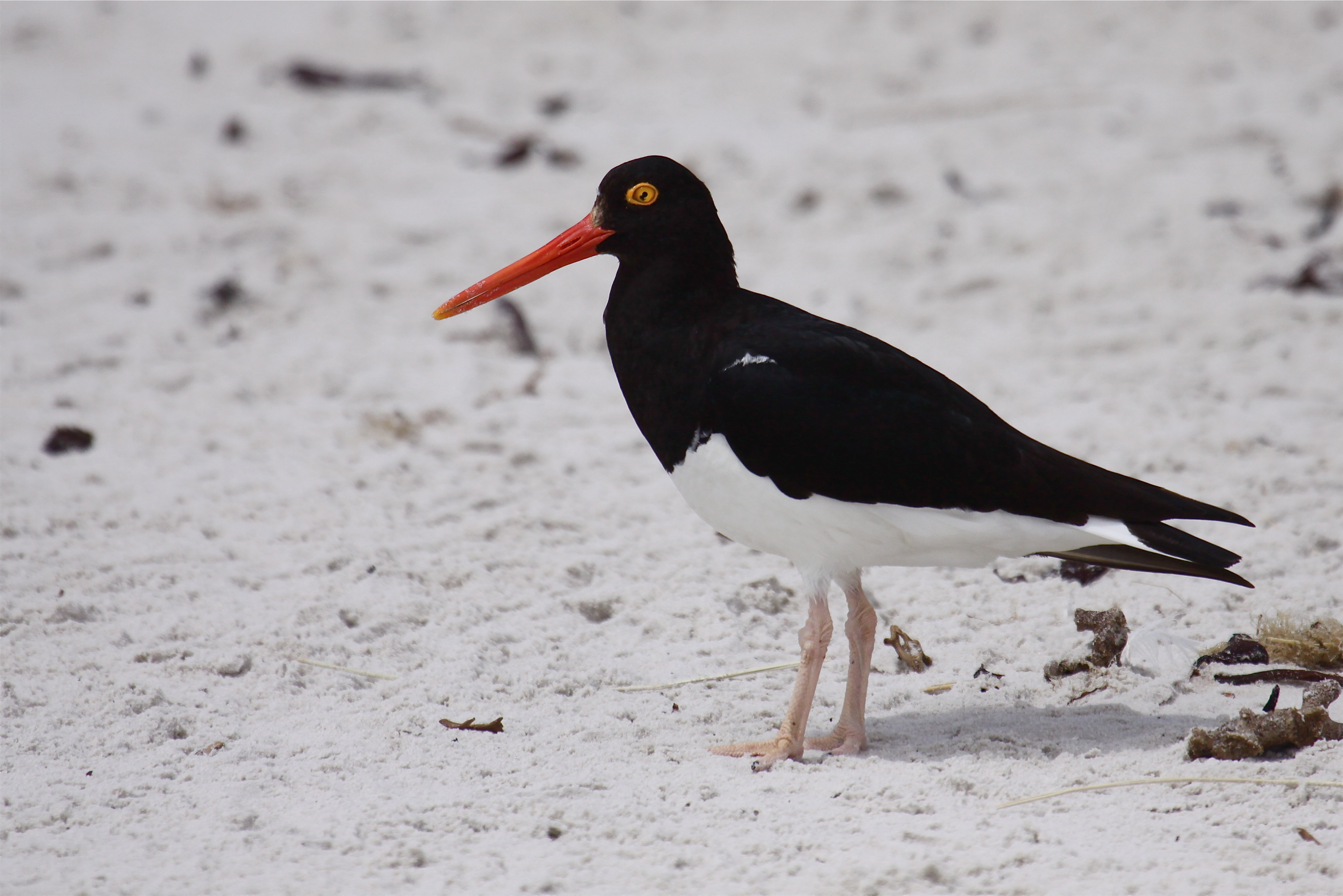
Magellanic oystercatcher

The bay was designated as a Ramsar site under the Ramsar Convention in 2004, being an area of around 59,000 hectares (150,000 acres) of international importance to wetland birds. It has also been identified as an Important Bird Area. It is visited from October to March each year by large numbers of migratory shorebirds which overwinter here, including 23% of the world population of the Hudsonian godwit (Limosa haemastica) and over 88% of the American population of red knot (Calidris canutus). Other migratory and domestic species include the white-rumped sandpiper (Calidris fuscicollis), the Magellanic plover (Pluvianellus socialis) and the Chilean flamingo (Phoenicopterus chilensis), as well as Baird's sandpiper (Calidris bairdii), the sanderling (Calidris alba), the rufous-chested plover (Charadrius modestus), the two-banded plover (Charadrius falklandicus), the whimbrel (Numenius phaeopus), the Magellanic oystercatcher (Haematopus leucopodus), the American oystercatcher (Haematopus palliatus) and the kelp gull (Larus dominicanus).

== Flora and fauna ==
Precipitation is very low in this area and the vegetation on the Patagonian steppe land is largely dominated by the grasses Festuca spp., while the saltmarshes are covered by succulent plants such as the glasswort Salicornia ambigua and the seablite Suaeda argentinensis. The mud flats provide habitat for bivalve molluscs and various polychaete worms, as well as many other invertebrates, and these provide food for the shore birds. Cetaceans visit the bay and sometimes get stranded on the mudflats, with 21 different species having been recorded.
