= Foster School of Business =

Business school of the University of Washington in Seattle

Coordinates: 47°39′32″N 122°18′26″W

University of Washington Foster School of Business
- Other name: Michael G. Foster School of Business
- Motto: better together, better tomorrow
- Type: Public business school
- Established: 1917
- Affiliations: University of Washington
- Dean: Frank Hodge
- Location: Seattle, Washington, U.S.
- Website: foster.uw.edu

The University of Washington Foster School of Business (also known as UW Foster) is the business school of the University of Washington in Seattle, Washington. Founded in 1917 as the University of Washington School of Business Administration, it is one of the oldest business schools in the western United States.

The school is accredited by the Association to Advance Collegiate Schools of Business (AACSB) and offers undergraduate, graduate, and doctoral programs across a range of business disciplines. Enrollment includes approximately 2,500 students in degree programs and more than 1,000 professionals annually in executive education programs.

== History ==
Founded in 1917, the University of Washington School of Business Administration was established as the second business school in the western United States.

In 1981, Nancy Jacob, an alumna of the University of Washington, was appointed dean, becoming the first woman to lead a major American business school.

On September 7, 2007, the University of Washington announced that the business school would be renamed in honor of alumnus Michael G. Foster (businessman) following a $50 million pledge.

During the 2010s and early 2020s, the school expanded its facilities and academic programs. New buildings on the Seattle campus included PACCAR Hall (2010), Dempsey Hall (2012), and Founders Hall (2022), which was constructed using mass timber and serves as a hub for classrooms and academic programs.

During this period, the school also expanded its graduate program portfolio, including the introduction of specialized master’s degrees and additional MBA program formats designed for working professionals.

== Campus ==
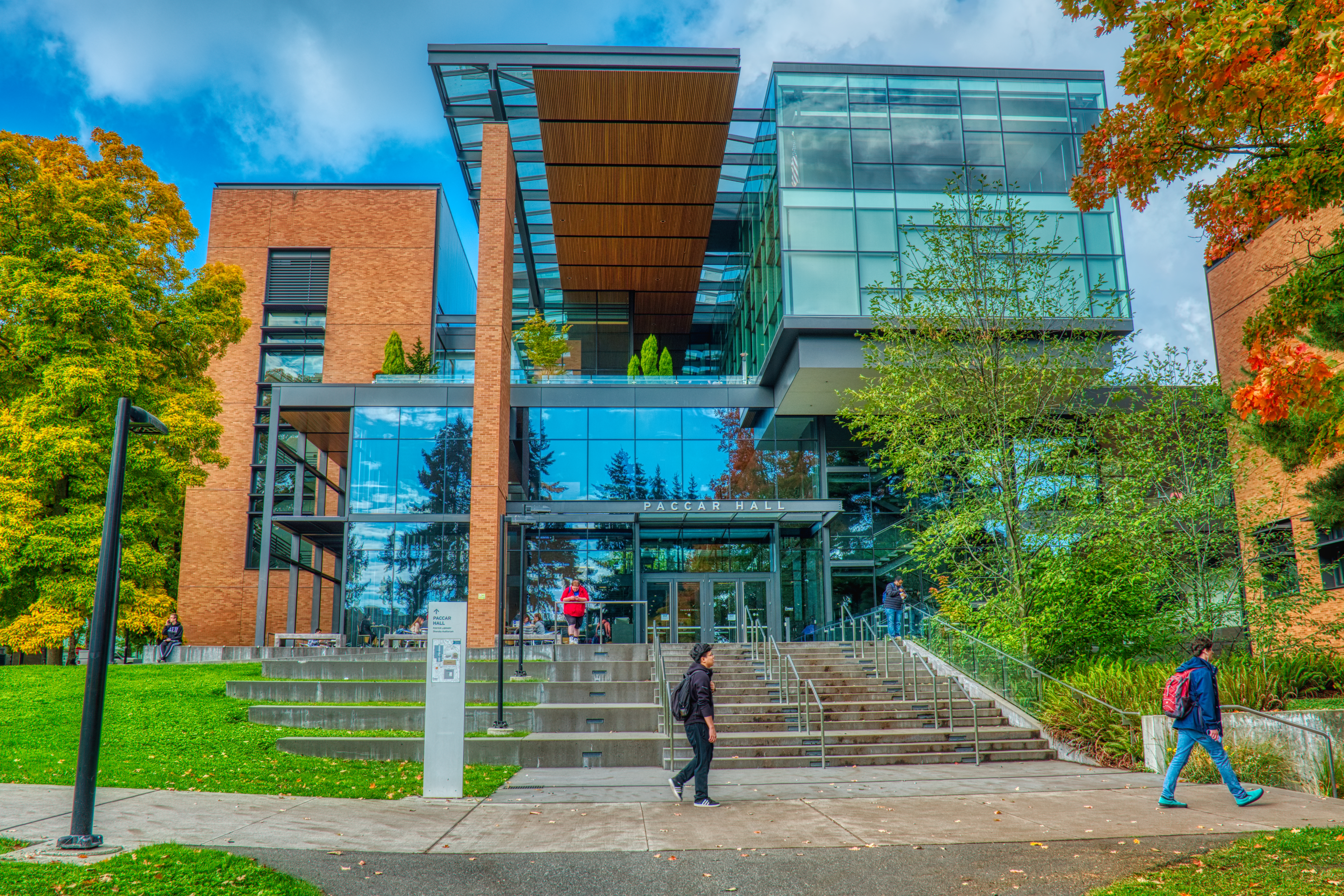
Paccar Hall during Fall Quarter

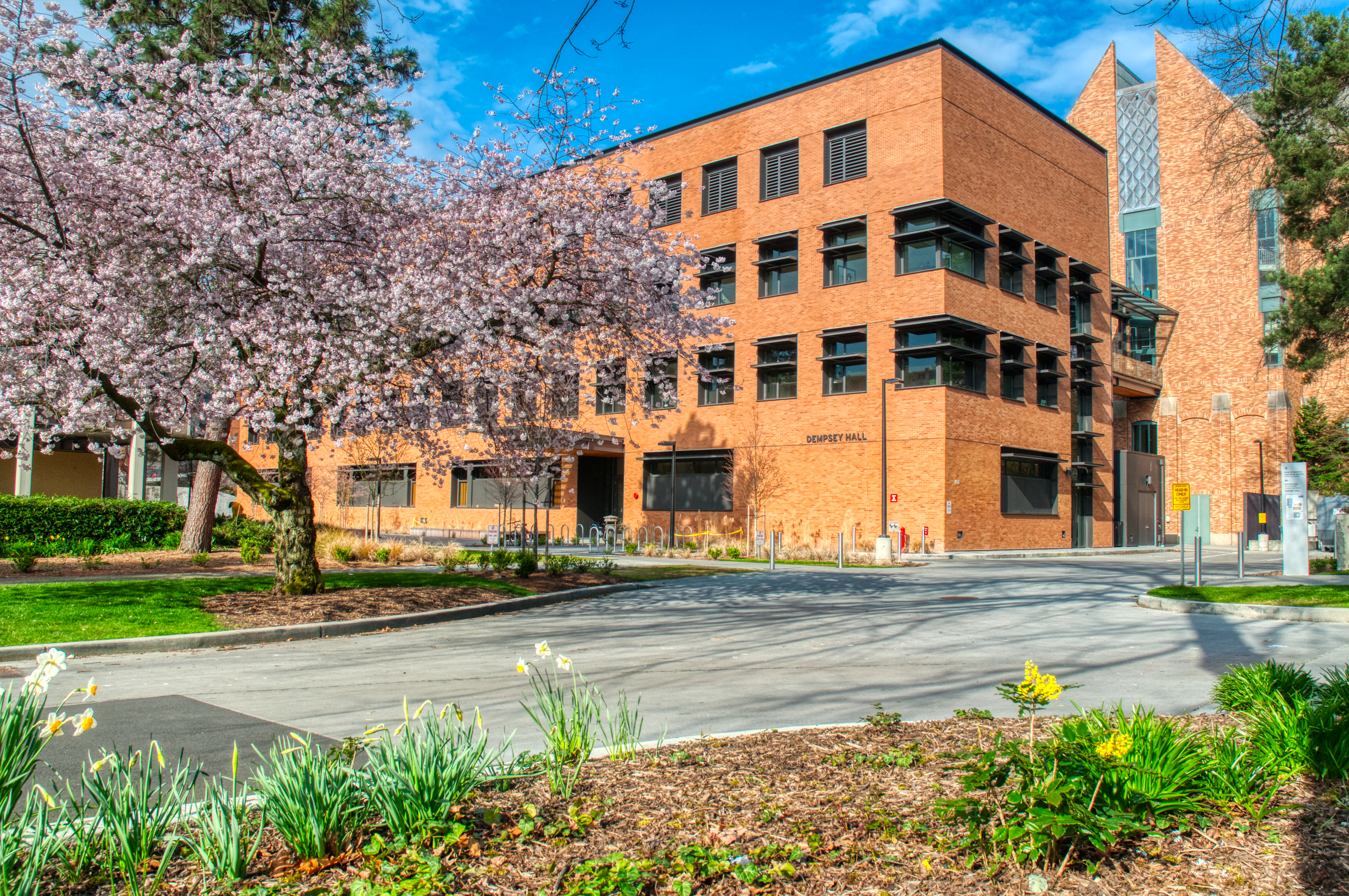
Dempsey Hall

The business school operates at five buildings: four in Seattle, Washington, and one in Kirkland, Washington.

=== Seattle Buildings ===
- Paccar Hall, constructed in 2010, serves as the business school's flagship building. It contains faculty offices, classrooms, and a cafe and commons. The Shansby Auditorium, the business school's largest lecture hall, is located on the first floor. The Foster Business Library is also accessible from PACCAR. A multi-level skybridge connects Paccar Hall to Dempsey Hall.
- Founders Hall, constructed in 2022, was funded entirely by private gifts from leadership donors. In addition to classrooms, Founder's Hall is home to the offices of the Foster School's Consulting & Business Development Center, the Global Business Center, the Center for Leadership and Strategic Thinking, as well as the Foster School Advancement and Alumni teams. It is one of the greenest buildings on the University of Washington campus, designed to achieve a 79% reduction in energy consumption over the next 60 years.
- Dempsey Hall, named for Neal Dempsey, general partner with Bay Partners and lifelong supporter of the University of Washington. Dempsey Hall opened in 2012. It contains a number of classrooms and offices, including the office of the Dean.
- The Bank of America Executive Education Center houses the offices, classrooms, and lounge spaces for the Executive Education and Executive MBA programs for the Foster School of Business.

=== Kirkland Buildings ===
- Eastside Executive Center is located in Kirkland, Washington, and houses offices and classrooms, and collaborative study spaces for the Technology Management MBA Program and the Hybrid MBA Program.

== Academics ==
Business school rankings

United States
- QS MBA: 27
- Bloomberg MBA: 23
- USNWR MBA: 27

Global
- QS MBA: 65
- Financial Times MBA: 32

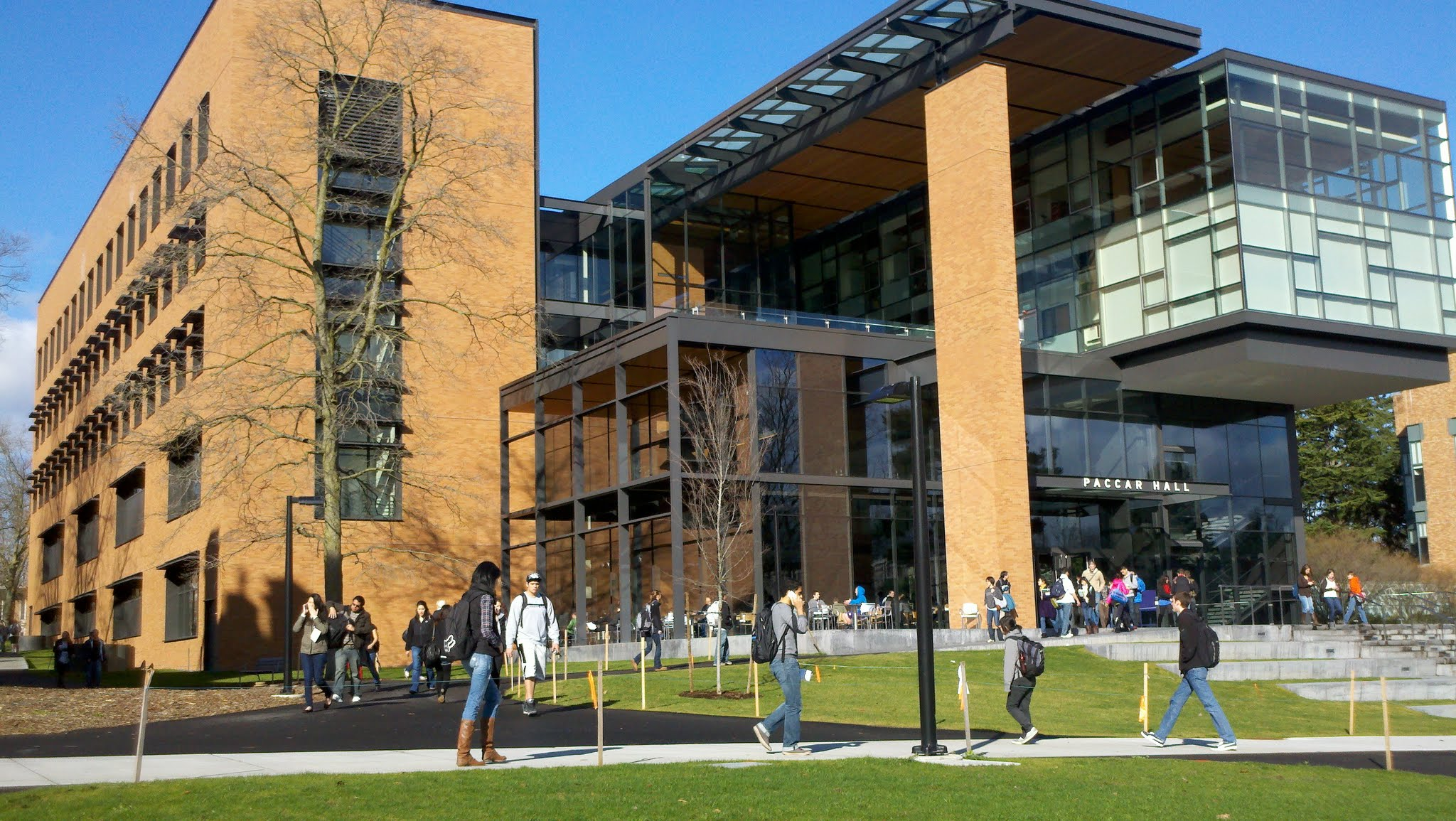
Paccar Hall

The University of Washington Foster School of Business offers undergraduate, graduate, and doctoral programs across a range of business disciplines.

At the undergraduate level, Foster offers a Bachelor of Arts in Business Administration (BABA) degree with areas of study including accounting, finance, marketing, information systems, operations and supply chain management, human resources, and entrepreneurship. Students complete a common core curriculum before specializing in a chosen area.

Graduate programs include multiple Master of Business Administration (MBA) formats, including full-time, evening, executive, and hybrid options designed for working professionals. The school also offers specialized master's degrees in fields such as business analytics, information systems, supply chain management, finance, taxation, and entrepreneurship.

Foster also offers a Doctor of Philosophy (PhD) program in business disciplines, focused on academic research and training for careers in higher education.

The school comprises five academic departments: accounting, finance and business economics, information systems and operations management, management and organization, and marketing and international business.

=== Admissions ===
Admission into the Foster School of Business is highly competitive. At the undergraduate level, the majority of students are admitted through Standard Admission. Through Standard Admission, students first matriculate to the University of Washington as pre-major students, then apply to Foster after completing certain prerequisite courses, prior to their sophomore or junior year.

A small number of students are admitted through the Freshman Direct program, directly out of high school. These students are selected from the pool of students admitted into the University of Washington, and exhibit "exceptionally competitive" academic records. In 2018, admitted Freshman Direct students had an average high school unweighted GPA of 3.91 (on a 4.0 scale).

The MBA program is one of the top 20 most competitive in the nation, with an average undergraduate gpa of 3.3 and a GMAT of 710.

Rankings

The Foster School of Business MBA program is ranked 23rd in the nation by Bloomberg, 27th by US News and 16th by Financial Times. The Financial Times Global rankings lists the Foster School of Business at #30 in the world. An objective ranking of Faculty Scholarly Productivity Index by Academic Analytics ranks University of Washington #1 in research productivity in Business Administration and #8 in marketing. U.S. News & World Report ranked Foster's Evening MBA program 5th among public universities in 2024.

U.S. News ranks Foster's undergraduate program #17 nationwide on their list of Best Undergraduate Business Programs, out of 504 U.S. schools, and #9 among public universities.

=== Centers ===
The following centers and specialty programs are part of the UW Foster School of Business:

- Arthur W. Buerk Center for Entrepreneurship. The University of Washington supports Seattle and the Pacific Northwest, one of the primary venture capital and entrepreneur communities in the West Coast, United States. The Buerk Center for Entrepreneurship connects students, faculty and business community members together and serves as resource for start-ups and companies.
- Center for Leadership and Strategic Thinking. The Center for Leadership and Strategic Thinking (CSLT) examines methods and effectiveness of leadership in various industries including health care, defense, and aviation. Center research employs simulations and game theory as new approaches to teaching business management
- Center for Sales and Marketing Strategy. The Center for Sales and Marketing Strategy aligns important sales and marketing problems with academic research and analysis techniques to develop strategies that improve business performance, and facilitate business-academic collaboration to create and disseminate sales and marketing knowledge.
- Consulting and Business Development Center. The Consulting and Business Development Center provides students with consulting experience, pairing student teams with growing businesses in economically distressed and under-represented minority communities.
- Global Business Center. The UW Global Business Center works in partnership with the United States Department of Education to contribute to the international competitiveness of American business by developing and supporting international business programs for students, faculty, and the business community.
- Certificate in International Studies in Business. Created in 1992 with support from the Center for International Business, Education and Research, the Certificate of International Studies in Business at the University of Washington enables undergraduate business students to gain knowledge of international issues and global business practices.
- The Product Management Center. The Product Management Center
- USTC-UW Institute for Global Business and Finance Innovation. The University of Science and Technology of China-UW Institute for Global Business and Finance Innovation fosters collaborative research, promotes student exchange, and supports international education and training through a partnership between the School of Management at the University of Science and Technology of China and the University of Washington Michael G. Foster School of Business.
- Foster Customer Analytics Center. The Foster Customer Analytics Center develops and fosters relationships between businesses, researchers, and students in the fields of machine learning and marketing analytics.
- Creative Destruction Lab.

=== Student life ===
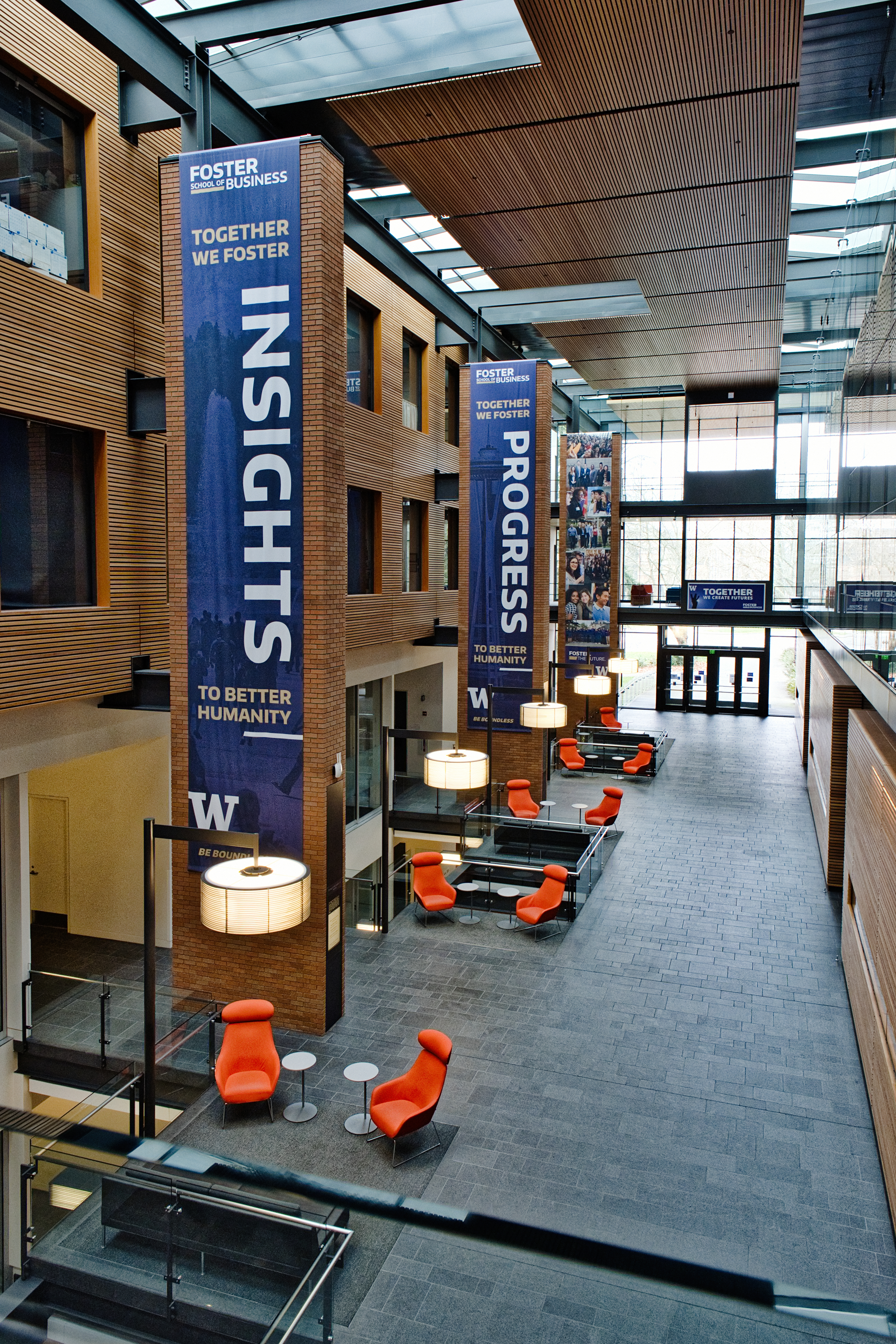
Interior of PACCAR

UW students can join over 1,000 registered student organizations. Some registered student organizations include:

- Out in Business, a student organization that positions Foster MBA students to be "leaders of LGBTQ+ inclusion" in business.
- Global Business Association, a student organization that enhances Foster MBA candidates’ understanding of cross-border and cross-cultural business issues that permeate the modern business environment.
- Business Ethics Association, a student organization that spotlights the importance of ethical business practices.
- Business Impact Group UW, a student organization that works with the UW's Consulting & Business Development Center to develop tactical strategies for small business.
- Asian Business Student Association.
- Diversity in Business, a student organization in the Foster MBA program.
- Alpha Kappa Psi Business Fraternity, a student organization for those who have an interest in business to be provided with opportunities to learn and grow through professional development, philanthropy, and social events.
- Association of Black Business Students, a student organization that recruits, assists, and organizes to promote the interest and success of students from underrepresented communities majoring in or interested in business.

=== Achievements ===
Some achievements of the University of Washington Business School:

- UW Foster School of Business has the 2nd most productive management research faculty in North America, according to a joint study by Texas A&M University and the University of Florida.
- UW Team won the Leeds 2011 Net Impact Case Competition, the nation's premier case competition built around businesses facing sustainability challenges.
- University of Washington Foster School of Business PhD Program in Accounting ranks among the top five in the world in a study conducted by Brigham Young University and Utah State University.

=== Publication ===
- Foster Business. The business magazine reports news from the UW business school.
- Journal of Financial and Quantitative Analysis. It highlights theoretical and empirical research in financial economics.

== Notable faculty and alumni ==
- Kenny G, American smooth jazz saxophonist
- Chika Yoshida, Japanese YouTuber
- Jim Beattie, former pitcher for the New York Yankees and Seattle Mariners
- Fred Beckey, American rock climber and mountaineer
- Paige Mackenzie, professional golfer
- Edgar Martínez, former Seattle Mariner and MLB Hall of Famer
- Robert Moch, American rower in the 1936 Olympics
- Courtney Thompson, former volleyball player, former member of the United States women's national volleyball team
- Marques Tuiasosopo, retired quarterback for the Oakland Raiders
- David Bonderman, founding partner of TPG
- Yoshihiko Miyauchi, chairman and CEO of Japanese financial services group ORIX Corp
- Peter R. Fisher, U.S. Treasury official, Foster School of Business finance professor
- Robert W. Palmatier, Foster School of Business professor of Marketing
- Yong Tan, information systems scholar and University of Washington Foster School of Business professor
- Ronald Oliveira, CEO of Revolut USA
- Richard Roll (MBA 1963), American economist, best known for his work on portfolio theory and asset pricing
- Charles M. C. Lee, economist, Foster School of Business professor of accounting
- Michelle Gass, president & chief executive officer, Levi Strauss & Co.
- Jeffrey Brotman, co-founder and former chairman of Costco
- Bruce Nordstrom, former chairman and CEO of Nordstrom
- Annie Young-Scrivner, CEO of Wella
- Hean Tat Keh (PhD 1998), Foster School of Business Professor of Marketing and director of research at Monash University
- Marcus Charles, restaurateur and entrepreneur
- Fran Bigelow, founder of Fran's Chocolates
- Ivar Haglund, founder of Ivar's
- Orin C. Smith, former president and CEO of Starbucks Corporation
- Andrew Brimmer, the first African American to serve as governor of the Federal Reserve System
- Suzan DelBene, American politician and businesswoman
- John Eng, the first Asian American elected to the Washington state legislature
- Mark Pigott, former chairman and chief executive officer of PACCAR
- Tobias Read (MBA 2003), Oregon Secretary of State, former Oregon State Treasurer and former businessman
- Michael G. Foster, businessman and philanthropist; namesake of the Michael G. Foster School of Business
- Amanda Moll, pole vaulter
- Venise Chan, professional Tennis Player
- Robert Khoo, president of Penny Arcade
- Peter Adkison, game designer and founder of Wizards of the Coast
- Ivan Liachko, founder and CEO of Phase Genomics
- Donald Bren, chairman and owner of the Irvine Company
- William S. Ayer, pilot and CFO of Alaska Airlines former president and CEO
- Andy Schneider, airline executive; chief executive officer of Horizon Air
- Stanley McDonald, founder of Princess Cruises
- Brad Tilden, national chair of Scouting America former CEO of the Alaska Air Group

== See also ==
- List of United States business school rankings
- List of business schools in the United States
- MBA
