= List of PAX events =

List of annual events

Below is a list of PAX events. This list includes the annual events PAX East, PAX West, PAX South, PAX Australia, and PAX Dev.

== 2000s ==
=== 2004 ===
Attendance at the Penny Arcade Expo from 2004 to 2012

On April 12, 2004, the authors of Penny Arcade announced PAX, the Penny Arcade Expo. PAX 2004 was a two-day event held at the Meydenbauer Center in Bellevue, Washington, from August 28–29, which they hoped would turn into an annual event. Several exhibitors, including Warner Bros., Microsoft, Rooster Teeth and Ubisoft, showcased videos and playable demos of their upcoming games at PAX 2004. Microsoft allowed attendees to experience a multiplayer level of Halo 2 months before it hit stores in addition to a number of other Xbox games, while Ubisoft showed Tom Clancy's Splinter Cell: Chaos Theory and Ghost Recon 2. Warner Bros. brought all of its E3 assets for The Matrix Online to the show as well as several hands-on stations for the game. Included amongst the events of the first PAX were live musical performances by bands including The Minibosses, panels featuring Penny Arcade creators Mike Krahulik and Jerry Holkins as well as others in the video game industry, and the Omegathon, a contest where twenty contestants played a series of games for a chance at winning an excessively large video game collection worth an excess of $25,000. The contestants competed in a tabletop dice game called Diceland, Halo, Mario Kart: Double Dash, Dance Dance Revolution, Doom and the original home version of Pong. Sean Celaya defeated Kevin Potter in the final round to take home the grand prize becoming the PAX 2004 Omegathon champion. Penny Arcade claimed that precisely 1337 (or "leet") people pre-registered, to which Holkins mused, "though I ordinarily shun leet-speak that number clearly implies the blessing of gaming deities." Roughly 3,300 people attended the event.

=== 2005 ===
PAX 2005 took place from August 26–28 at the Meydenbauer Center in Bellevue, Washington, where the first PAX was held. PAX 2005, unlike its predecessor, occupied the entire center, effectively doubling the usable floor space. Sponsors included Nintendo, Sony, Microsoft, Ubisoft and NCsoft, among others. Musical guests included the rock groups Minibosses and The NESkimos, self-professed "professional hardcore gangster rapper" mc chris, pianists Martin Leung and Connie Lin, nerdcore hiphopper MC Frontalot, and rap/funk group Optimus Rhyme, who performed live in two separate concerts in a massive theater. Events from PAX 2004 such as Pitch Your Game Idea, Red vs. Blue, a screening of the 1989 film The Wizard, and Penny Arcade Q&A made encore appearances. New events included Beat The Pros and industry panels on online gaming, the video game marketing process, and controversy in the industry. Omegathon II was an even more elaborate affair than its predecessor. Krahulik said that, "[At PAX 2005] we will deliver an even bigger prize to the winner of the Omegathon." It was revealed that prize would be the complete NES video game library, with a claimed value of at least $10,099.99. The prize was locked in a large cage in the exhibition room and also included two Star Wars-themed Alienware gaming PCs, one of which would go to the winner and the other to the runner-up. Contestants competed in the tabletop game Diceland, Mario Kart: Double Dash, Katamari Damacy, Karaoke Revolution, Quake, and the Atari 2600 game Combat. In a four-round match, Luke "Coreside" Armstrong defeated Will "LeRoy" Garroutte by a single point to win the best-of-three series 2-1-1 and take home the grand prize. In total, more than 9,000 gamers attended PAX 2005, almost triple the previous year's attendance. In response to Hurricane Katrina, Penny Arcade auctioned off the original pencil sketch of the PAX 2005 program cover on eBay with the profit to be given to the American Red Cross. It was sold to Christian Boggs for the final price of $8,700. Mr. Boggs also placed the winning bid of $20,000 on an auction to appear in a Penny Arcade comic strip at the 2005 Child's Play Charity Dinner.

=== 2006 ===
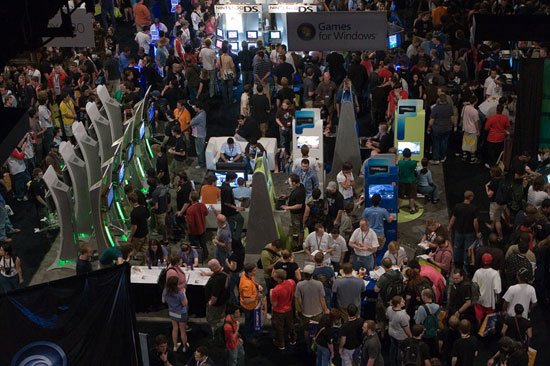
PAX 2006 expo area

PAX 2006 was held from August 25–27. The Meydenbauer Center in Bellevue was again used as the venue, although the Tabletop Gaming area was moved offsite to the ballrooms at the nearby Red Lion hotel. Exhibit space at PAX 06 completely sold out in less than three months, with exhibitors including Nintendo, Microsoft, Ubisoft, Turbine Inc, Technomancer Press, NCSoft, Rooster Teeth, Creative Labs, Wizards of the Coast, and nVidia. According to Krahulik, there were 19,323 attendees. In the Omegathon, returning Omeganaut Will "LeRoy" Garroutte defeated David "Davertron" Davis in the final round of the Omegathon: head to head Tetris. LeRoy took away a brand new Scion car fully loaded with custom wheels, custom sound, LCD TV, Xbox 360 Premium, wireless controllers, and more. Davertron left with an Xbox 360 Premium and $500 Best Buy gift card, and returned as an Omeganaut in 2007. Holkins and PA business manager Robert Khoo led the way into Omegathon Round 5, Guitar Hero II. After playing through "Trippin on a Hole In a Paper Heart" on expert, Holkins smashed the guitar on stage. Krahulik and Holkins announced the first ever Penny Arcade video game titled On The Rain-Slick Precipice of Darkness: Episode One (which has since been released) and that the game would feature PA characters in episodic adventures. Details were few; when asked what the game was about, Holkins replied "Gabe. Tycho. And Cthulhu." Krahulik and Holkins also announced a Penny Arcade annual scholarship, wherein one applicant with an intention to work in the game industry will be awarded $10,000 toward tuition expenses. Several game companies ran large prize tournaments and giveaways, including ArenaNet ($10,000 prize tourney), TableStar ($2,500 prize tourney), and Nvidia (several thousand dollars' worth of video cards).

=== 2007 ===
The fourth annual Penny Arcade Expo took place August 24–27 and experienced its first year within the confines of the 130,000 square feet (12,000 m^{2}) of the Washington State Convention and Trade Center, more than doubling the space used to house PAX 2006. The massive Electronic Entertainment Expo (E3) was heavily downsized in 2006, which allowed the growing Penny Arcade Expo to become the biggest gamer festival in North America. Headliners for 2007's PAX included Nintendo, Microsoft and Sony, as well as others such as Ubisoft, NCSoft, THQ, Wizards of the Coast, Namco-Bandai, Vivendi, Konami and 45 other game publishers and developers. The 2007 keynote speech was delivered by Wil Wheaton. Attendance was reported at 39,000. For the final round of the Omegathon, Ryan "Accalon" Zack and Ben "MNC Dover" Gray competed on never before seen levels of Halo 3. Accalon won the grand prize, $5000 and a trip to the Tokyo Game Show. While the convention was housed on three of the floors of the Washington State Convention and Trade Center, the exhibition hall was certainly a busy place, featuring educational, video game and tabletop exhibitors, as well as retailers. The layout of the exhibition hall allowed visitors to peruse through a variety of displays, offering places where they could win their weight in Ramen noodles or enter the World's Smallest Dungeon, as hosted by Technomancer Press.

=== 2008 ===
PAX 2008 was held from August 29–31 at the Washington State Convention and Trade Center in Seattle, Washington, United States. The pre-show attendance estimate was 45,000, but this was soon thought to be a low guess. The final count of tickets sold was reported as 58,500, including 45,000 pre-registered tickets. The 2008 keynote was delivered by Ken Levine. The exhibition hall space was doubled from that of 2007, and tabletop gaming and an additional panel room was located in the Pike Street Annex of the convention center, the first time this space has been used for PAX. Despite the large increase in convention space, overflow still occurred at some events. New for 2008 was the PAX 10, a judged selection of self-submitted independent games on which attendees voted for a favorite. PAX 10 selections include Chronotron, the Maw, and Schizoid. To account for crowds, one empty exhibition room was explicitly reserved for the purpose of holding queues for the popular events in the main theater and other queues as needed. PAX 2008 came to a close with Fallout and Geko playing Vs. Excitebike, again for $5000 and a trip to the Tokyo Game Show; Geko was victorious.

=== 2009 ===
PAX 2009 was held from September 4–6 at the Washington State Convention and Trade Center in Seattle, Washington, United States. The total attendance of the convention was 60,750. The keynote speaker was Ron Gilbert. Musical guests included previous performers Anamanaguchi, Freezepop, Jonathan Coulton, Molly Lewis and MC Frontalot, along with first-time PAX appearances by Metroid Metal and Paul & Storm. For the first time, PAX occupied the entire convention center to accommodate an increase in attendees. Despite the increase in capacity, two days before the start of the show, PAX passes were sold out for the first time. Penny Arcade then announced that no passes would be sold on-site, however circumstances allowed on-site sales of 1,000 extra one-day passes each for Saturday and Sunday. After many attendees reported feeling sick, an H1N1 outbreak was later confirmed. At least 100 cases of H1N1 virus infections were confirmed in attendees after the convention.

== 2010s ==
=== 2010 ===
The first PAX East was held from March 26–28 at the John B. Hynes Veterans Memorial Convention Center in Boston, Massachusetts, United States. A partnership was arranged with Reed Exhibitions to handle the logistics of the expo. This event, first announced in August 2008, was the first Penny Arcade Expo outside Washington state. On December 23, 2009, Mike Krahulik announced that the number of pre-registrants indicate PAX East Coast may exceed the number of attendees of any previous PAX. It was later announced in January 2010 that tickets for PAX East were close to selling out, and that attendance would most likely be capped as the previous PAX 2009, leaving little-to-no tickets being available at the door for the event. On February 3, 2010, Penny Arcade Expo's business head Robert Khoo updated his Twitter page with word that 3-day badges had sold out for the event. Later in February 2010 the lineup of exhibitors and panel discussions were announced for the full weekend, along with the announcement of the musical guests planned to perform at the event, such as Anamanaguchi, Metroid Metal, MC Frontalot, the Protomen, the Video Game Orchestra and Jonathan Coulton. The keynote speaker was Wil Wheaton, who had previously given the keynote at PAX Prime 2007. The final attendance count was revealed to be 52,290 attendees for the full weekend of PAX East. Plans have been confirmed to use the Boston Convention and Exhibition Center (BCEC) for future PAX East conventions, likely due to complaints of overcrowding and cramped event halls at the much smaller Hynes Convention Center. Penny Arcade has signed an agreement to keep the show in Boston through 2013.

PAX Prime 2010 was held from September 3–5 at the Washington State Convention and Trade Center in Seattle, Washington, United States. Attendance was reported at 67,600, compared to that of PAX Prime 2009's 60,750. The keynote was given by Warren Spector. Musical guests included Anamanaguchi, Jonathan Coulton, MC Frontalot, Metroid Metal, Minibosses, Paul and Storm, Martin O'Donnell, and the Protomen. For the first time since occupying the Washington State Convention and Trade Center, PAX Prime 2010 included events at offsite locations. Instead of occupying just the exposition hall at the center, the keynote speech, large panels, and concerts were held at Benaroya Hall. The Pike St. Annex (since renamed to The Conference Center) was used (as it was in 2007), as well as the registration and one panel room located at the nearby Sheraton. These changes allowed PAX Prime 2010's expo hall to double in size vs. 2009. Notable games included Star Wars: The Old Republic, Duke Nukem Forever, Portal 2, League of Legends, Guild Wars 2, Marvel vs. Capcom 3: Fate of Two Worlds, Mortal Kombat, Sonic Colors, Epic Mickey, and Halo: Reach.

=== 2011 ===
PAX East 2011 was held from March 11–13 at the Boston Convention and Exhibition Center in Boston, Massachusetts, United States. The BCEC boasts a total area of 516,000 square feet (47,900 m^{2}), over the Hynes' 193,000 square feet (17,900 m^{2}) [289,100 square feet (26,860 m^{2}) including the theater and meeting rooms]. The year's musical guests included Jonathan Coulton, MC Frontalot, Metroid Metal, Paul and Storm, The Protomen, and the Video Game Orchestra. The keynote speaker was Jane McGonigal

Being held for the first time in 2011, PAX Dev is an event exclusive to the game development community. It took place on the two days prior to PAX Prime 2011, August 24 and 25, at the Sheraton Seattle Hotel. There were 750 attendees, all of whom are involved in game development. Press were not allowed to attend the event.

PAX Prime 2011 was held from August 26–28 at the Washington State Convention and Trade Center in Seattle, Washington, United States. The event brought in over 70,000 attendees, breaking the attendance record set at PAX East 2011 and making it the largest PAX to date. The keynote was delivered by David Jaffe. Musical guests included the familiar performances of The MiniBosses, Metroid Metal, MC Frontalot, Paul & Storm, Jonathan Coulton. In addition, Supercommuter and the Video Game Orchestra made debut performances. Notable events included Halo Fest - a celebration of the first 10 years of Halo history.

=== 2012 ===
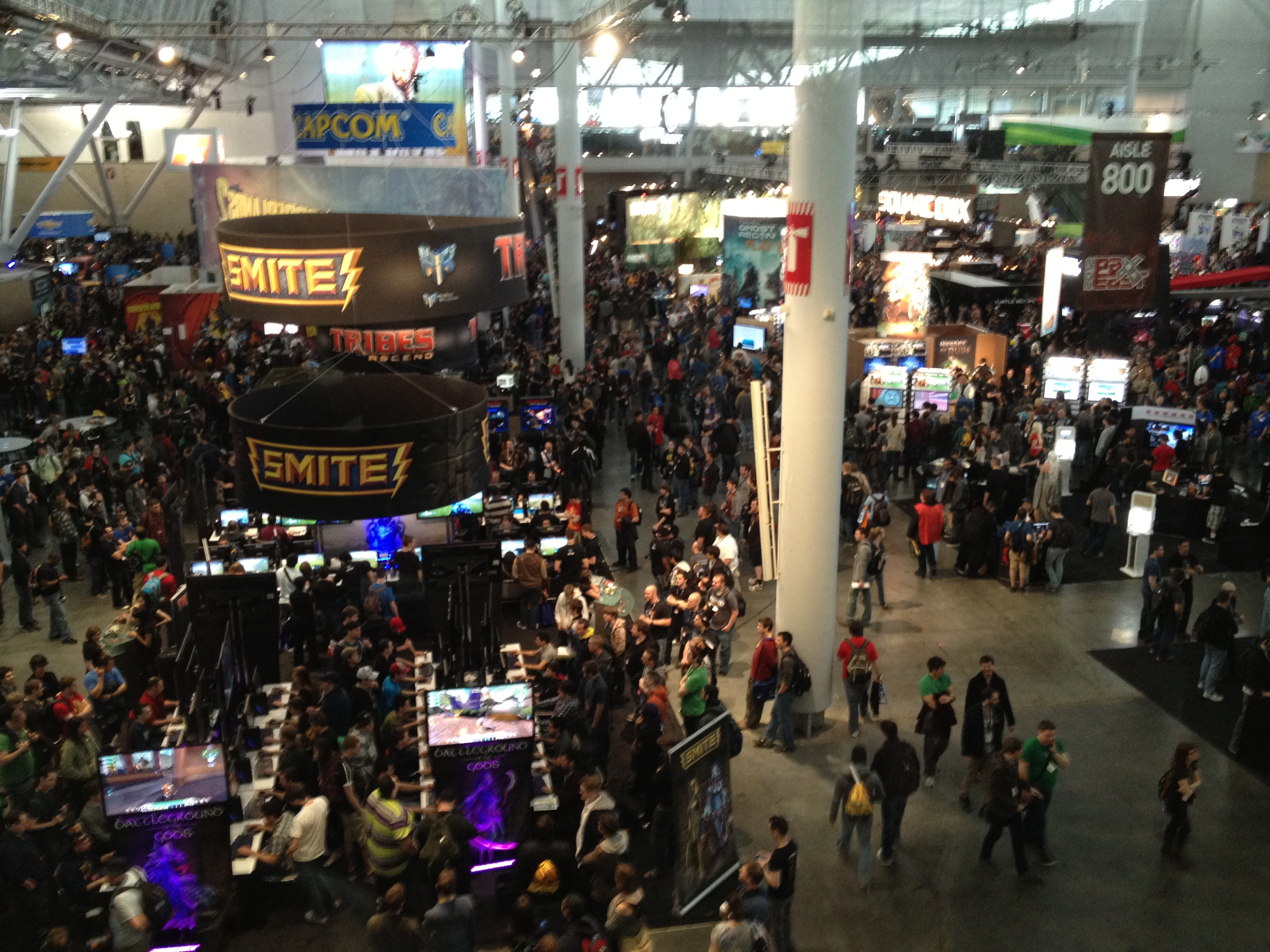
PAX East 2012 expo area

PAX East 2012 was held from April 6–8 at the Boston Convention and Exhibition Center in Boston, Massachusetts, United States. All of the passes sold out except for single-day Sunday passes (due to the event being held on Easter Weekend). The Exhibition Hall held over 160 booths, including game design companies such as Riot Games and Electronic Arts, hardware companies such as Alienware/Dell and Xbox (Microsoft), and other various companies. PAX East also held a console freeplay area, where attendees could play games such as Deus Ex: Human Revolution, Dance Central 2, Tony Hawk Ride, and Rock Band Blitz, and various console tournaments for games such as Super Smash Bros. Brawl, Tetris Splash, and Halo: Reach. There was a PC freeplay area, where games such as Battlefield 3, League of Legends, and Minecraft could be played, and PC tournaments for Magic Online, League of Legends, and Starcraft 2. There was also a tabletop gaming area, where many types of games were being played, and where tournaments for games such as Puzzle Strike, Dominion, and Penny Arcade: The Game. There were also handheld tournaments, for games such as Mario Kart DS and Tetris DS. Panels were held during most of the day in the various theaters. Concerts were held in the evenings, featuring performers such as Minibosses, Metroid Metal, The Protomen, Video Game Orchestra, Paul and Storm, Jonathan Coulton, Supercommuter and MC Frontalot.

A new event, PAX Dev, was introduced in 2012. PAX Dev 2012, was held from August 29–30.

PAX Prime 2012 was held from August 31 – September 2 at the Washington State Convention and Trade Center in Seattle, Washington, United States. Badges for the event went on sale April 25. However, due to technical issues, badge sales were halted on the same day. A week later, on May 2, sales resumed and within 5 hours all 3-day badges were sold out. The keynote was delivered by Ted Price. Concerts were held in the evenings at the Paramount, featuring The Protomen, Video Game Orchestra, Sam Hart, Supercommuter, Paul and Storm, Jonathan Coulton, and MC Frontalot. Special guests on stage at the Saturday night concert included Wil Wheaton, John Roderick, Aubrey Webber of The Doubleclicks, and Hank Green. Notable events included the League of Legends North American Regional tournament hosted by Riot Games, which took over most of the sixth floor and drew a crowd of thousands of fans and cosplayers. To promote the release of Kirby's Dream Collection, Nintendo invited attendees to assist in breaking the Guinness World Record for most simultaneous chewing gum bubbles blown at once.

=== 2013 ===
PAX East 2013 took place March 22–24 at the Boston Convention and Exhibition Center in Boston, Massachusetts, United States. Passes went on sale October 8, 2012, and 3-day passes were sold out by the next day. All passes were completely sold out by February 28, 2013. At PAX East, Blizzard Entertainment announced Hearthstone: Heroes of Warcraft. Additionally, the console version of Diablo III was made playable for the first time. Dungeon Defenders 2, Marvel Heroes, Warface, Remember Me and Elder Scrolls Online were all playable in the expo hall. Many indie developers also came and showed off their games, including Guacamelee, Outlast, Castle Story and Super Time Force. Musical performances by Jonathan Coulton, MC Frontalot, Paul and Storm, The Protomen, Sam Hart, Those Who Fight, Video Game Orchestra, and the Video Game Music Choir.

The first PAX Australia, PAX Australia 2013 was held from July 19–21 at the Melbourne Showgrounds in Melbourne, Victoria, Australia at the Melbourne Showgrounds and was organized locally by ReedPop. PAX Australia was the first time that the Penny Arcade Expo was held outside of the United States. Holkins and Krahulik, as well as Victorian Minister for Innovation Louise Asher, announced that PAX Australia will return in 2014. The keynote was conducted by Ron Gilbert.

PAX Dev 2013 was held from August 28–29.

PAX Prime 2013 was held from August 30 – September 2 at the Washington State Convention and Trade Center in Seattle, Washington, United States. Badges for the event went on sale April 17, 2013. 4 day passes sold out within 23 minutes. All badges for the event were sold out entirely in five and a half hours. The keynote speaker was Peter Molyneux.

=== 2014 ===
PAX East 2014 was held from April 11–13 at the Boston Convention and Exhibition Center in Boston, Massachusetts, United States. Passes went on sale on October 23, 2013. Three-day passes were sold out in under an hour and all passes were completely sold out by November 7, 2013. An agreement reached in early 2012 extended Boston as the home of PAX East until 2023. Musical performances included The Doubleclicks, MC Frontalot, Metroid Metal, Anamanaguchi, Bit Brigade, and The Video Game Orchestra

PAX Dev 2014 was held from August 27–28.

PAX Prime 2014 was held from August 29 – September 1 at the Washington State Convention and Trade Center in Seattle, Washington, United States. Badges for the event went on sale May 28, 2014. The 4-day passes sold out within 15 minutes, and all badges were sold out within 75 minutes. The keynote speaker was Mikey Neumann, the writer of Borderlands: Origins.

PAX Australia 2014 was held from October 31 – November 2 at the Melbourne Convention & Exhibition Centre in Melbourne, Victoria, Australia. Melbourne was also confirmed as the home of PAX Australia until 2019.

=== 2015 ===
The first PAX South, PAX South 2015, was held from January 23–25 at the Henry B. González Convention Center in San Antonio, Texas, United States. It set a PAX record for highest attendance for a PAX event's inaugural year.

PAX East 2015 was held from March 6–8 at the Boston Convention and Exhibition Center in Boston, Massachusetts, United States. The event featured content for Hearthstone, Heroes of the Storm, and Overwatch. At PAX East, Blizzard announced a new adventure for Hearthstone, Blackrock Mountain.

PAX Dev 2015 was held from August 26–27.

PAX Prime 2015 was held on August 28–31 at the Washington State Convention and Trade Center in Seattle, Washington, United States. The event featured tournaments for Super Smash Bros. for Wii U and Super Smash Bros. Melee, which were won by Gonzalo "ZeRo" Barrios and Jason "Mew2King" Zimmerman respectively.

PAX Australia 2015 was held from October 30 – November 1 at the Melbourne Convention & Exhibition Centre in Melbourne, Victoria, Australia.

On November 18, 2015, it was confirmed that PAX Prime was being renamed to PAX West.

=== 2016 ===
PAX South 2016 was held from January 29–31 at the Henry B. González Convention Center in San Antonio, Texas, United States. This was followed by PAX East 2016, which was held from April 22–24 at the Boston Convention and Exhibition Center in Boston, Massachusetts, United States. Next, PAX Dev 2016 was held from August 31 – September 1.

PAX West 2016 was held on September 2–5 at the Washington State Convention and Trade Center in Seattle, Washington, United States.

PAX Australia 2016 was held from November 4–6 at the Melbourne Convention & Exhibition Centre in Melbourne, Australia.

=== 2017 ===
PAX South 2017 was held from January 27–29 at the Henry B. González Convention Center in San Antonio, Texas, United States.

PAX East 2017 was held from March 10–12 at the Boston Convention and Exhibition Center in Boston, Massachusetts, United States.

PAX Dev 2017 was held from August 29–30.

PAX West 2017 was held from September 1–4 at the Washington State Convention and Trade Center in Seattle, Washington, United States.

PAX Australia 2017 was held from October 27–29 at the Melbourne Convention & Exhibition Centre in Melbourne, Australia.

PAX Unplugged 2017 was held from November 17–19 at the Pennsylvania Convention Center in Philadelphia, Pennsylvania, United States. At PAX South 2017, Penny Arcade announced a new annual PAX focused on tabletop games, to be called PAX Unplugged. In explaining the need, Holkins said "I've looked down from [PAX East]'s skybridges and seen what would be an entire convention right there, just of tabletop games!" while also joking that due to his schedule of annual events, the only way he would be able to attend a tabletop convention would be to found one himself. Rather than the traditional evening music concerts, Unplugged featured a live game of Dungeons & Dragons.

=== 2018 ===
PAX South 2018 was held from January 12–14 at the Henry B. González Convention Center in San Antonio, Texas, United States.

PAX East 2018 was held from April 5–8 at the Boston Convention and Exhibition Center in Boston, Massachusetts, United States.

PAX Dev 2018 was held from August 28–29.

PAX West 2018 was held from August 31 – September 3 at the Washington State Convention and Trade Center in Seattle, Washington, United States.

PAX Australia 2018 was held from October 26–28 at the Melbourne Convention & Exhibition Centre in Melbourne, Australia.

PAX Unplugged 2018 was held from November 30 – December 2 at the Pennsylvania Convention Center in Philadelphia, Pennsylvania, United States, with several areas significantly expanded over the inaugural year.

=== 2019 ===
PAX South 2019 was held from January 18–20 at the Henry B. González Convention Center in San Antonio, Texas, United States.

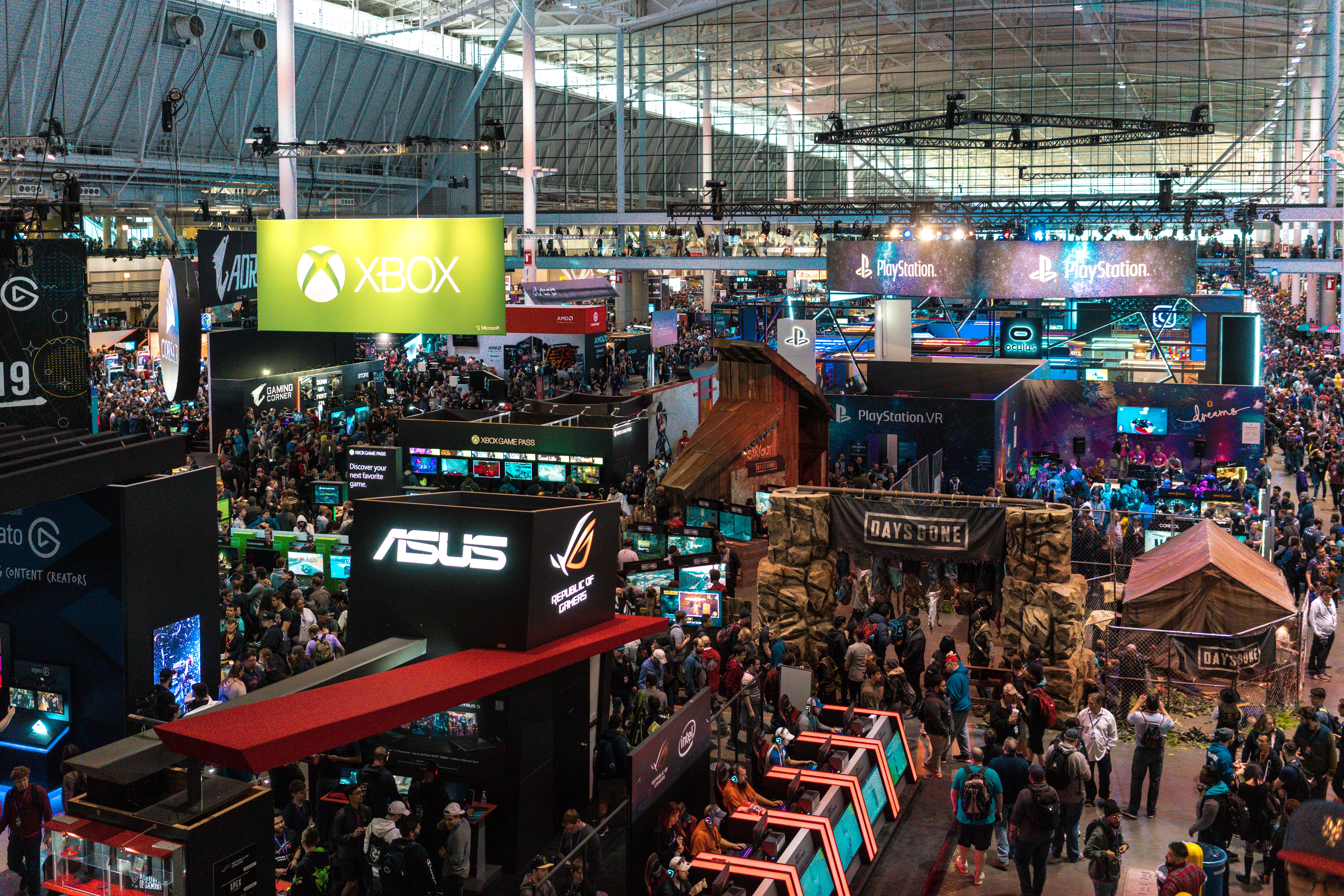
PAX East 2019 exhibition area

PAX East 2019 was held from March 28–31 at the Boston Convention and Exhibition Center in Boston, Massachusetts, United States.

PAX Dev 2019 was held from August 27–28.

PAX West 2019 was held from August 30 – September 2 at the Washington State Convention and Trade Center in Seattle, Washington, United States.

PAX Australia 2019 was held from October 11–13 at the Melbourne Convention & Exhibition Centre in Melbourne, Australia.

PAX Unplugged 2019 was held from December 6–8 at the Pennsylvania Convention Center in Philadelphia, Pennsylvania, United States. This event also marked the 50th PAX event.

== 2020s ==
=== 2020 ===
PAX South 2020 was held from January 17–19 at the Henry B. González Convention Center in San Antonio, Texas, United States.

PAX East 2020 was held from February 27 – March 1 at the Boston Convention and Exhibition Center in Boston, Massachusetts, United States. On 19 February 2020, Sony announced its intentions to withdraw from the scheduled event due to fears over the coronavirus outbreak. Following the announcement, other companies such as Capcom, Square Enix and other notable video game publishers also confirmed plans to skip the event due to safety concerns of its staff. The news coincided with similar GDC 2020 withdrawal announcements. In response to Sony's withdrawal, Boston Mayor Marty Walsh urged the corporation to reverse its decision in a letter addressed to CEO Kenichiro Yoshida.

Following coronavirus outbreak fears within the gaming community, PAX addressed raised concerns by announcing enhanced health and safety procedures to be carried out by staff during the course of the event by adhering to the recommendations set by the United States Environmental Protection Agency.

PAX West, PAX Australia and PAX Unplugged were due to be scheduled from September 4–7 at the Washington State Convention Center in Seattle, Washington, United States, from October 9–11 at the Melbourne Convention & Exhibition Centre in Melbourne, Australia and from November 20–22 at the Pennsylvania Convention Center in Philadelphia, Pennsylvania, United States but were all cancelled due to the ongoing COVID-19 pandemic. On June 30, 2020, PAX announced that it was joining forces with EGX to hold a 9-day online event, which will take place from September 12–20, 2020; a month later on July 27, 2020, the online event was given the name PAX Online X EGX Digital.

=== 2021 ===
On December 4, 2020, PAX announced 'optimistic' dates for its 2021 live events if everything goes to plan with the roll out of COVID-19 vaccinations. These were events and dates for their 2021 events:

- PAX East 2021 at the Boston Convention and Exhibition Center in Boston, Massachusetts, United States from June 3–6. (later cancelled on March 29 and replaced by PAX Online, which ran from July 15–18)
- PAX West 2021 at the Washington State Convention and Trade Center in Seattle, Washington, United States from September 3–6.
- PAX Unplugged 2021 at the Pennsylvania Convention Center in Philadelphia, Pennsylvania, United States from December 10–12.

PAX South was not included in their list for 2021, it was originally going to return in 2022, but it was announced on October 30, 2021, that there are no plans for future PAX South events due to COVID-19 and lack of growth.

On March 10, 2021, a live event for PAX Australia was announced and was originally going to be held at the Melbourne Convention & Exhibition Centre in Melbourne, Australia from October 8–10, but was eventually cancelled on August 10, 2021, and ran as an online event instead, held on the same dates under the name PAX Aus Online.

=== 2022 ===
PAX East 2022 was held from April 21–24 at the Boston Convention and Exhibition Center in Boston, Massachusetts, United States.

PAX West 2022 was held from September 2–5 at the Washington State Convention Center in Seattle, Washington, United States.

PAX Australia 2022 was held from October 7–9 at the Melbourne Convention & Exhibition Centre in Melbourne, Australia. IEM Rio Major 2022's Asia-Pacific RMR was held on the event.

PAX Unplugged 2022 was held from December 2–4 at the Pennsylvania Convention Center in Philadelphia, Pennsylvania, United States.

=== 2023 ===
PAX East 2023 was held from March 23–26 at the Boston Convention and Exhibition Center in Boston, Massachusetts, United States.

PAX West 2023 was held from September 1–4 at the Seattle Convention Center in Seattle, Washington, United States.

PAX Australia 2023 was held from October 6–8 at the Melbourne Convention & Exhibition Centre in Melbourne, Australia.

PAX Unplugged 2023 was held from December 6–8 at the Pennsylvania Convention Center in Philadelphia, Pennsylvania, United States.

=== 2024 ===
PAX East 2024 was held from March 21–24 at the Boston Convention and Exhibition Center in Boston, Massachusetts, United States.

PAX West 2024 was held from August 30 – September 2 at the Seattle Convention Center in Seattle, Washington, United States.

PAX Australia 2024 was held from October 11–13 at the Melbourne Convention & Exhibition Centre in Melbourne, Australia.

PAX Unplugged 2024 was held from December 6–8 at the Pennsylvania Convention Center in Philadelphia, Pennsylvania, United States.

=== 2025 ===
PAX East 2025 was held from May 8–11 at the Boston Convention and Exhibition Center in Boston, Massachusetts, United States.

PAX West 2025 was held from August 29 – September 1 at the Seattle Convention Center in Seattle, Washington, United States.

PAX Australia 2025 was held from October 10–12 at the Melbourne Convention & Exhibition Centre in Melbourne, Australia.

== Event History ==
=== Penny Arcade Expo ===
Dates	Venue	City	Atten.	Guests
August 28–29, 2004	Meydenbauer Center	Bellevue, Washington		Jerry Holkins and Mike Krahulik
August 26–28, 2005	Meydenbauer Center	Bellevue, Washington		Jerry Holkins, Mike Krahulik, and Rooster Teeth
August 25–27, 2006	Meydenbauer Center	Bellevue, Washington		Jerry Holkins and Mike Krahulik
August 24–26, 2007	Washington State Convention Center	Seattle, Washington		Jerry Holkins, Mike Krahulik, and Wil Wheaton
August 29–31, 2008	Washington State Convention Center	Seattle, Washington	58,000	Jonathan Coulton, Freezepop, MC Frontalot, and The OneUps
September 4–6, 2009	Washington State Convention Center	Seattle, Washington		Jonathan Coulton

=== PAX East ===
Dates	Venue	City	Atten.	Guests
March 26–28, 2010	Hynes Convention Center	Boston, Massachusetts		
March 11–13, 2011	Boston Convention and Exhibition Center	Boston, Massachusetts		
April 6–8, 2012	Boston Convention and Exhibition Center	Boston, Massachusetts		
March 22–24, 2013	Boston Convention and Exhibition Center	Boston, Massachusetts		
April 11–13, 2014	Boston Convention and Exhibition Center	Boston, Massachusetts		
March 6–8, 2015	Boston Convention and Exhibition Center	Boston, Massachusetts		
April 22–24, 2016	Boston Convention and Exhibition Center	Boston, Massachusetts		
March 10–12, 2017	Boston Convention and Exhibition Center	Boston, Massachusetts		
April 5–8, 2018	Boston Convention and Exhibition Center	Boston, Massachusetts		
March 28–31, 2019	Boston Convention and Exhibition Center	Boston, Massachusetts		
February 27 – March 1, 2020	Boston Convention and Exhibition Center	Boston, Massachusetts		
April 21–24, 2022	Boston Convention and Exhibition Center	Boston, Massachusetts		
March 23–26, 2023	Boston Convention and Exhibition Center	Boston, Massachusetts		
March 21–24, 2024	Boston Convention and Exhibition Center	Boston, Massachusetts		
May 8–11, 2025	Boston Convention and Exhibition Center	Boston, Massachusetts		
March 26–29, 2026				

=== PAX Dev ===
Dates	Venue	City	Atten.	Guests

=== PAX Prime ===
Dates	Venue	City	Atten.	Guests
September 3–5, 2010	Washington State Convention Center	Seattle, Washington		Jeff Cannata, Jonathan Coulton, MC Frontalot, Jerry Holkins, Mike Krahulik, Scott Kurtz, The Protomen, Rooster Teeth, and Wil Wheaton
August 26–28, 2011	Washington State Convention Center	Seattle, Washington		
August 31 – September 2, 2012	Washington State Convention Center	Seattle, Washington		
August 30 – September 2, 2013	Washington State Convention Center	Seattle, Washington		
August 29 – September 1, 2014	Washington State Convention Center	Seattle, Washington		
August 28–31, 2015	Washington State Convention Center	Seattle, Washington		

=== PAX Australia ===
Dates	Venue	City	Atten.	Guests
July 19–21, 2013	Melbourne Showgrounds	Melbourne, Victoria, Australia		
October 31 – November 2, 2014	Melbourne Convention Centre	Melbourne, Victoria, Australia		
October 30 – November 1, 2015	Melbourne Convention Centre	Melbourne, Victoria, Australia		
November 4–6, 2016	Melbourne Convention Centre	Melbourne, Victoria, Australia		
October 27–29, 2017	Melbourne Convention and Exhibition Centre	Melbourne, Victoria, Australia		
October 26–28, 2018	Melbourne Convention and Exhibition Centre	Melbourne, Victoria, Australia		
October 11–13, 2019	Melbourne Convention and Exhibition Centre	Melbourne, Victoria, Australia		
October 7–9, 2022	Melbourne Convention and Exhibition Centre	Melbourne, Victoria, Australia		
October 6–8, 2023	Melbourne Convention and Exhibition Centre	Melbourne, Victoria, Australia		
October 11–13, 2024	Melbourne Convention and Exhibition Centre	Melbourne, Victoria, Australia		
October 10–12, 2025	Melbourne Convention and Exhibition Centre	Melbourne, Victoria, Australia		
October 9-11, 2026	Melbourne Convention and Exhibition Centre	Melbourne, Victoria, Australia		

=== PAX West ===
Dates	Venue	City	Atten.	Guests
September 2–5, 2016	Washington State Convention Center	Seattle, Washington		
September 1–4, 2017	Washington State Convention Center	Seattle, Washington		
August 31 – September 3, 2018	Washington State Convention Center	Seattle, Washington		
August 30 – September 2, 2019	Washington State Convention Center	Seattle, Washington		
September 3–6, 2021	Washington State Convention Center	Seattle, Washington		
September 2–5, 2022	Seattle Convention Center	Seattle, Washington		
September 1–4, 2023	Seattle Convention Center	Seattle, Washington		
August 30 – September 2, 2024	Seattle Convention Center	Seattle, Washington		
August 29 – September 1, 2025	Seattle Convention Center	Seattle, Washington		

=== PAX South ===
Dates	Venue	City	Atten.	Guests
January 23–25, 2015	Henry B. Gonzalez Convention Center	San Antonio, Texas		
January 29–31, 2016	Henry B. Gonzalez Convention Center	San Antonio, Texas		
January 27–29, 2017	Henry B. Gonzalez Convention Center	San Antonio, Texas		
January 12–14, 2018	Henry B. Gonzalez Convention Center	San Antonio, Texas		
January 18–20, 2019	Henry B. Gonzalez Convention Center	San Antonio, Texas		
January 17–19, 2020	Henry B. Gonzalez Convention Center	San Antonio, Texas		

=== PAX Unplugged ===
Dates	Venue	City	Atten.	Guests
November 17–19, 2017	Pennsylvania Convention Center	Philadelphia, Pennsylvania		
November 30 – December 2, 2018	Pennsylvania Convention Center	Philadelphia, Pennsylvania		
December 6–8, 2019	Pennsylvania Convention Center	Philadelphia, Pennsylvania		
December 10–12, 2021	Pennsylvania Convention Center	Philadelphia, Pennsylvania		
December 2–4, 2022	Pennsylvania Convention Center	Philadelphia, Pennsylvania		
December 1–3, 2023	Pennsylvania Convention Center	Philadelphia, Pennsylvania		
December 6–8, 2024	Pennsylvania Convention Center	Philadelphia, Pennsylvania		
November 21–23, 2025	Pennsylvania Convention Center	Philadelphia, Pennsylvania		
