= School of Management, HIT =

School of Management, Harbin Institute of Technology
- Type: Business school
- Established: 1920
- Parent institution: Harbin Institute of Technology
- Affiliations: See list for affiliations
- Dean: Qiang Ye(叶强)
- Academic staff: 213
- Undergraduates: 793
- Postgraduates: 455
- Doctoral students: 396
- Location: Harbin, Heilongjiang, China
- Website: som.hit.edu.cn/EN_Som/index.html

School of Management, HIT (Chinese: 哈尔滨工业大学管理学院) is the business school of Harbin Institute of Technology. It has three campuses, including Harbin campus, Weihai campus and Shenzhen campus.

There are approximately 213 full—time faculty members consisting of assistant, associate, and full professors.

== History ==
School of Management, HIT is one of the oldest business school in China. The school traces its origins to 1920, when several institutes were merged to form a single School of Management. The earliest courses offered included engineering economics, transportation economics and railway administration. During the 1950s, the school received strategic support from scholars from the Soviet Union, and pioneered the teaching and research of management and economics in China. A large number of scholars and government officials graduated from this school.

== MBA programs ==
The MBA program of School of Management, HIT received accreditation from Association of MBAs, and is the first accredited business school in Northeast China.

== Big Data & BA Summer School ==
Big Data & BA Summer School is a one-week training program. Scholars and professionals of information system, FinTech, Marketing and related areas are invited as faculty members to lecture on research methodologies and cutting-edge topics of big data and business analytics. The professors include Anindya Ghose, Arun Rai, Qiang Ye and Yong Tan.
