= Moovn =

Ride-share and e-commerce company

Moovn Technologies, LLC
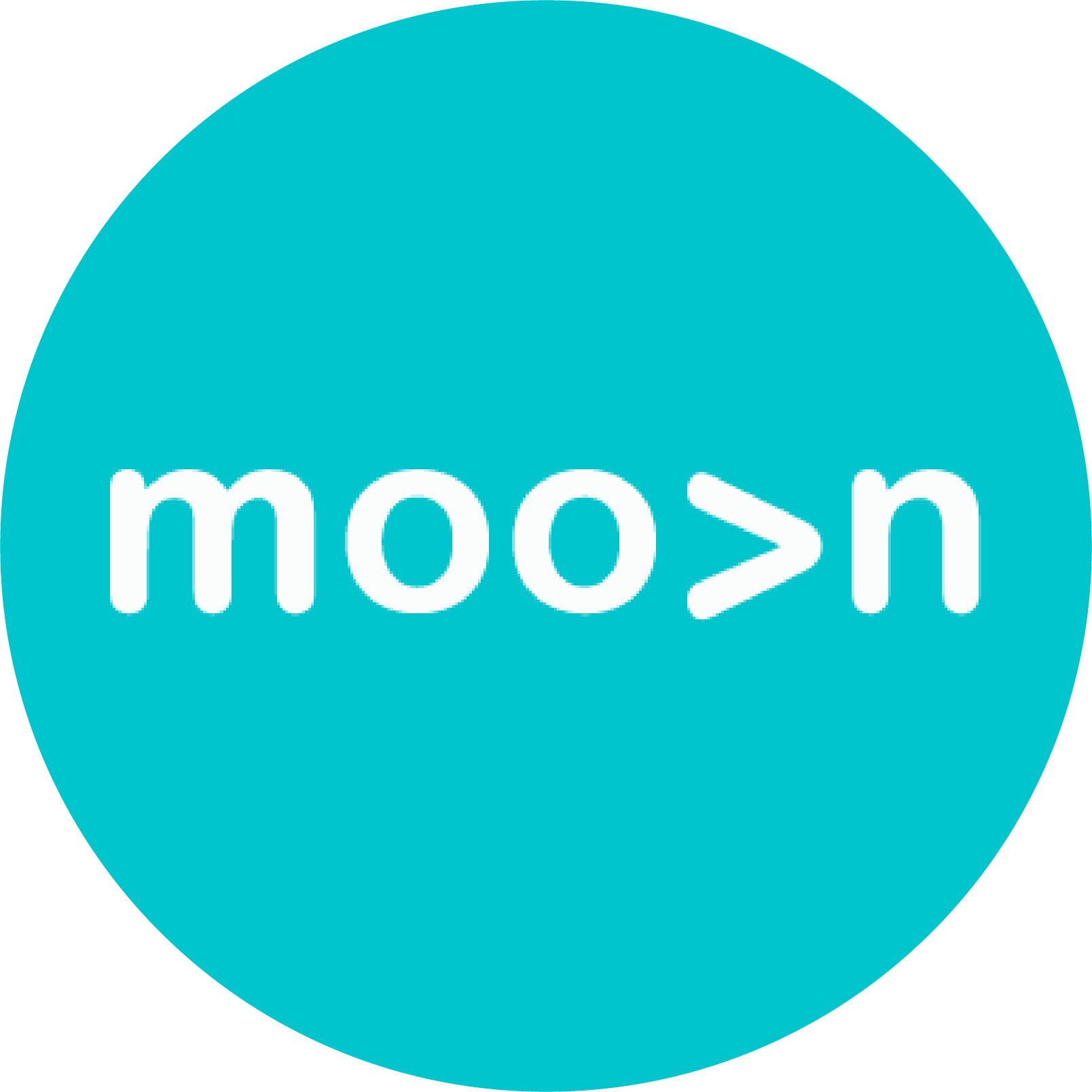
- Industry: Transportation, Mobility as a Service
- Founded: 2015
- Founder: Godwin N. Gabriel
- Headquarters: Seattle, Washington, United States
- Area served: US, Kenya and Tanzania
- Products: Moovn - Rideshare Moovn Pay - Digitizing Cash Shooga - Mobile Payments & Donations Noobea - Buying or Selling Products & Online Marketplace RUSH - Requesting and Tracking Package Deliveries through the Moovn App
- Services: Transportation Network Company
- Website: www.moovn.com

Moovn Technologies, LLC, commonly known as Moovn, is an American ridesharing company based in Seattle, Washington. Moovn is a mobile platform that allows users to instantly request or schedule rides in advance.

== History ==
Moovn was founded in 2015 by Godwin N. Gabriel, a Tanzanian immigrant in the United States. Gabriel studied at the University of Washington's Foster School of Business.

In 2016, Moovn had a 12-person team at its Seattle headquarters and 37 full-time employees supporting its Sub-Saharan operations.

By 2018, the company had raised $2.5 million in capital, reaching up to 30,000 rides booked through the company's app per day.

== Locations ==
Moovn expanded its geographical footprint and operates in seven cities across the United States, including New York City, Atlanta and San Francisco. The company also has operations in select cities in Sub-Saharan Africa including Nairobi (Kenya) and Dar es Salaam (Tanzania).
