= Charles M. C. Lee =

Charles Mien Chun Lee
- Born: October 12, 1957 (age 69); Taipei, Taiwan
- Occupations: Behavioral economist, accounting academic and asset manager

Academic background
- Education: BMath; MBA; PhD
- Alma mater: University of Waterloo; Cornell University

Charles Mien Chun Lee (born 12 October 1957) is a behavioral economist, accounting academic, and asset manager. He is the Moghadam Family Professor Emeritus at Stanford University's Graduate School of Business and the Kermit O. Hanson Professor of Accounting at the University of Washington's Foster School of Business.

Lee's research focuses on how human cognitive limitations and other influences affect information processing in markets, with publications in behavioral finance, market microstructure, equity valuation, financial analysis, quantitative investing, and securities regulation. He has received awards, such as the Lifetime Achievement Award from the American Accounting Association (AAA) Financial Accounting and Reporting Section (FARS) in 2024, the 2003 AAA Notable Contribution to Accounting Literature Prize, Q Group's Roger F. Murray Prize in 2018, as well as 12 awards for Teaching Excellence. He has been the Presidential Scholar of the AAA and was awarded Stanford University's Asian American Faculty Award for Outstanding Achievements and Service to the university and the Asian American Community.

Lee's work has been featured in media outlets such as The Economist, The New York Times, The Wall Street Journal, National Public Radio (NPR), the LA Times, Bloomberg, CNBC, Forbes, Barron's, and Institutional Investor.

== Education and early career ==
Lee earned a BMath from the University of Waterloo in 1981 followed by an MBA in 1989 and a PhD in 1990 from Cornell University. From 1980 to 1985, he worked in public accounting, with three years in the National Research Department of KPMG, Toronto, Canada. He holds a Certificate in Biblical Studies from Ontario Theological Seminary.

== Career ==
Lee's academic career is marked by positions at the Michigan Business School (1990–95), the Johnson Graduate School of Management, Cornell University (1996–2004), and the Graduate School of Business, Stanford University (2009–2021). Since 2022, he has been Moghadam Family Professor Emeritus at Stanford University's Graduate School of Business and the Kermit O. Hanson Professor of Accounting at the University of Washington's Foster School of Business.

In 1998, he co-founded the Cayuga Fund at the Johnson Graduate School of Management, Cornell University. In 2004, he joined Barclays Global Investors (now BlackRock) as managing director and was later appointed global head of equity research in 2006. In 2011, he co-founded Nipun Capital and has been acting as senior advisor since 2017.

Another aspect of Lee's career has focused on Christianity, including his role as a board member of Ambassadors for Christ.

== Research ==
Lee's research has spanned behavioral finance, equity valuation, financial reporting, market efficiency, and security market regulation, with a focus on the impact of human cognitive limitations and various factors on information processing in markets.

=== Behavioral finance ===
Lee has studied the impact of investor behavior and information processing on market dynamics. He explored how closed-end fund discounts are influenced by individual investor sentiment, finding that discounts narrow when small stocks perform well. Later, he demonstrated that systematic retail investor trading, particularly in small-cap, value, and low-priced stocks, explains return comovements and supports the role of investor sentiment in return formation. Furthermore, his investigation revealed that past trading volume links momentum and value strategies, with high volume correlating with lower future returns and low volume with higher returns.

Analyzing over 2.5 million investor questions on a Chinese interactive platform, Lee and Qinlin Zhong revealed that resolution of investor difficulties in processing publicly available information contributes to increased market activity and improved stock price formation.

=== Market efficiency ===
Lee's research has contributed to understanding the informational dynamics and interdependencies that influence market efficiency. In 2015, he co-authored Alphanomics: The Informational Underpinnings of Market Efficiency with Eric So, examining how information, investor behavior, and fundamental analysis contribute to market efficiency and drive abnormal returns. His research indicated that production complementarity between firms from different industries drives co-movement in their activities and returns, with a lead-lag effect in returns that can be exploited for alpha.

Collaborating with Mark J. Ready, Lee evaluated trade classification methods, identifying issues with quote-based approaches and proposing simpler procedures for improvement in classifying trades as either seller- or buyer-initiated. In 2021, he and Edward Watts used SEC's randomized Tick Size Pilot experiment to show that a tick size increase leads to a decline in algorithmic trading but an increase in fundamental investor activity and overall improvement in pricing efficiency.

=== Financial reporting and valuation ===
Lee has developed models and approaches in equity valuation and financial reporting. He introduced a model to estimate the cost of equity capital, observing that firm characteristics like industry, B/M ratio, growth rate, and analyst forecast dispersion explain much of the variation in implied costs-of-capital. Building upon this, he examined the predictive power of an analyst-based valuation model, finding that the V/P ratio, derived from consensus forecasts, predicts long-term stock returns and can be improved by accounting for errors in earnings forecasts.

In 2024, Lee devised an accounting-based Loan Portfolio Risk (LPR) variable and showed that the Equity-to-LPR ratio (ELPR) predicts bank failure and market-implied costs of capital, highlighting key risk factors not included in Basel Committee calculations.

=== Chinese Stock Markets ===
Several Lee studies highlight a need for security market reform in China. In a landmark 2010 study, Lee and his co-authors document widespread "tunneling," or the misappropriation of company resources for personal gains, by controlling shareholders of Chinese public companies. Another 2020 study examines how capital market frictions affect entrepreneurship and innovation in China. More recently, a 2023 study identifies China's stringent IPO regulations as the primary culprit behind a host of maladies in the country's stock markets.

== Personal life ==
Born Lee Mien Chun (李勉群) on October 12, 1957, in Taipei, Taiwan, to James and Cynthia Lee, he was the eldest of three children and migrated to Canada at age nine. In 1983, he married Lily C. Lee, and together they have two children.

== Awards and honors ==
- 2003 – Notable Contribution to Accounting Literature Prize, AAA
- 2014 – Asian American Faculty Award, Stanford University
- 2018 –Roger F. Murray Prize, Q Group
- 2024 – Lifetime Achievement Award, AAA FARS

== Bibliography ==
=== Books ===
- Alphanomics: The Informational Underpinnings of Market Efficiency (2015) ISBN 978-1-60198-892-8

=== Selected articles ===
- Lee, C. M., & Ready, M. J. (1991). Inferring trade direction from intraday data. The Journal of Finance, 46(2), 733–746.
- Lee, C. M., Shleifer, A., & Thaler, R. H. (1991). Investor sentiment and the closed‐end fund puzzle. The Journal of Finance, 46(1), 75–109.
- Lee, C. M., & Swaminathan, B. (2000). Price momentum and trading volume. The Journal of Finance, 55(5), 2017–2069.
- Gebhardt, W. R., Lee, C. M., & Swaminathan, B. (2001). Toward an implied cost of capital. Journal of Accounting Research, 39(1), 135–176.
- Kumar, A., & Lee, C. M. (2006). Retail investor sentiment and return comovements. The Journal of Finance, 61(5), 2451–2486.
- Lee, C. M., Shi, T. T., Sun, S. T., & Zhang, R. (2024). Production complementarity and information transmission across industries. Journal of Financial Economics, 155, 103812.
