= Phase Genomics =

American genomic sequencing company

- Type: Startup company
- Industry: Biotechnology
- Founded: 2015
- Founders: Ivan Liachko, Shawn Sullivan
- Headquarters: Seattle, Washington, US
- Key people: Ivan Liachko (CEO, president), Shawn Sullivan (CTO)
- Website: phasegenomics.com

Phase Genomics is an American biotechnology company based in Seattle, Washington. The company develops proximity ligation kits and Hi-C sequencing technology used to analyze chromosomes. Phase Genomics sells proximity ligation kits, scientific services, and computational analyses.

== History ==
The company was founded by Ivan Liachko and Shawn Sullivan in 2015. It was originally housed in the CoMotion biotech incubator at University of Washington before relocating to a separate facility. It develops proximity ligation kits and Hi-C sequencing technology used to analyze chromosomes. The company sells proximity ligation kits, scientific services, and computational analyses.

== Research ==
Phase Genomics developed a library preparation kit for the Hi-C sequencing method previously developed by researchers Job Dekker and Eric Lander. The kits are used to study the architecture of genomes. In 2018, Phase Genomics received a $1.5 million SBIR grant from the National Institute of Allergy and Infectious Diseases (NIAID) to research antimicrobial resistance using Hi-C technology. In January 2020, it was awarded an additional $1.5 million from NIAID for phase 2 SBIR funding. In 2019, Phase Genomics received $200,000 from the Bill & Melinda Gates Foundation to improve computational methods of extracting genomic data in microbiome samples. Later in 2019, the company was awarded $325,000 from the U.S. Department of Energy to research algae biofuels using proximity litigation technology for metagenome assembly. In 2020, Phase Genomics received 2 grants totaling $3.9 million from the National Human Genome Research Institute and the Eunice Kennedy Shriver National Institute of Child Health and Human Development. The 3-year grants fund research on chromosomal abnormalities causing cancer, infertility, and reproductive issues.

In June 2021, the company released a platform for discovering new viruses in microbiome samples.
