= Ronald Oliveira =

American businessman

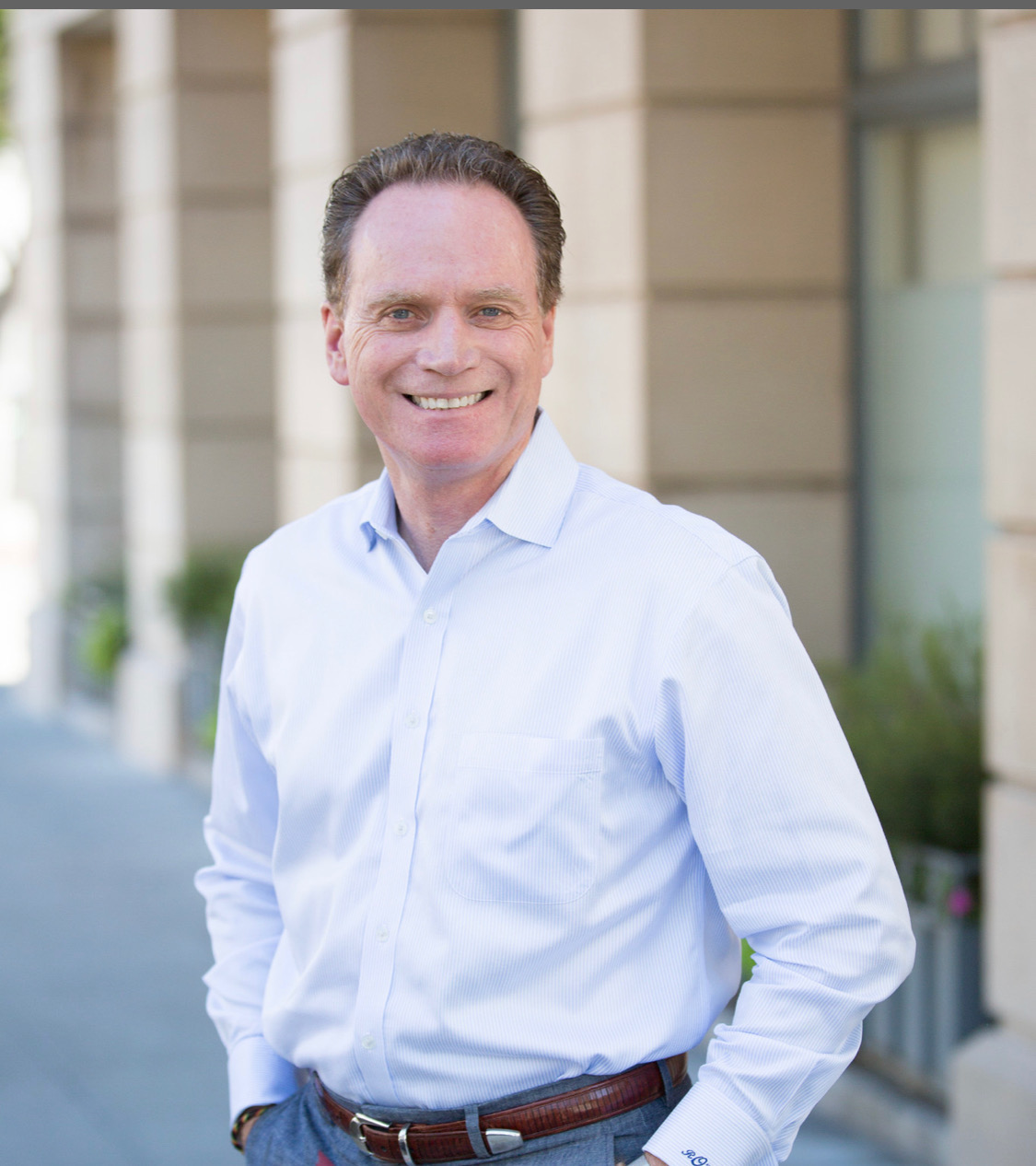
- Born: October 23, 1955 (age 70); Livermore, California, US
- Education: California State University, Fresno; Modesto Junior College
- Occupation: Businessman
- Known for: Former CEO, Revolut USA
- Term: August 2022 - present
- Children: 1

Ronald Oliveira (born 23 October 1955) is an American businessman, the former CEO of Revolut USA, and the former President of Avidbank.

Previously, he worked in senior management positions for several financial institutions. Oliveira was CEO of Revolut USA, the President and Chief Operating Officer at Heritage Oaks Bank, Senior Vice President of Rabobank National Association, and the former President and Chief Credit Officer of Avidbank.

He also held executive positions in credit administration, commercial lending, and retail banking for Union Bank and the Bank of California with responsibilities of Northern California, Oregon, Washington, and Guam/Saipan.

== Early life and education ==
Oliveira was born and raised in Livermore, California. He received his Bachelor of Science in Agribusiness from Fresno State University and is a graduate of the Pacific Coast Banking School at the University of Washington Foster School of Business.

== Business background ==
=== Rabobank ===
Oliveira was senior vice president at Rabobank for two years from 2008 to 2009 where he assisted with its expansion in the Midstate region of California.

=== Heritage Oaks Bank ===
In August 2009, Oliveira joined Heritage Oaks Bank as Executive Vice President, Chief Operating, and Chief Credit Officer. In 2010, Oliveira became President of Heritage Oaks Bank where he worked to improve credit quality and returning the bank to profitability.

=== Avidbank ===
In September 2013, Oliveira became the President and Chief Credit Officer of Avidbank.

=== Revolut ===
In 2019, Revolut hired Oliveira as new CEO of Revolut USA. In February 2020, Oliveira participated in a funding round raising $500MM of private capital from FinTech equity funds. He was also engineered Revolut's official public entry into the US with a truly global, digital-first platform and established the organization's foothold in New York, Dallas, and San Francisco.

=== Moonstone Bank ===
In March 7, 2022, Moonstone Bank (formerly and latterly known as Farmington State Bank (FSB)) appointed Oliveira as the Chief Supply and Demand Officer. Oliveira was responsible for leading the digital transformation of the organization into a provider of financial services to industries such as blockchain, cryptocurrencies and cannabis. Alameda Research, who invested in Moonstone, was owned by the now bankrupt company FTX, which formerly operated a fraud-ridden cryptocurrency exchange. Oliveria left Moonstone Bank in August 2022. US federal prosecutors seized FTX-related funds from the bank in January 2023 after FTX's failure, and FSB announced that it would return to community banking. Later that year FSB agreed to sell its operations and liquidate at the insistence of federal and state bank regulators.
