= Foster Business Library =

Albert O. and Evelyn W. Foster Business Library
- 47.65919°N 122.30871°W
- Location: Foster School of Business, University of Washington, USA
- Branch of: University of Washington Libraries

Other information
- Website: www.lib.washington.edu/business/

The Foster Business Library is the business library at the University of Washington in Seattle, Washington. As part of the university system of libraries, it serves the 3,500 students, faculty, and staff of the Foster School of Business. The 21,500 square-foot facility, which opened in 1997, is located under a garden, beneath an 80-foot-long (24 m) skylight, on two floors, connected with PACCAR Hall and adjacent to Dempsey Hall and the Bank of America Executive Education Center.

== Location ==
The library is located below-ground among the complex of buildings that comprise the Foster School of Business. The main entrance is located on the first floor of PACCAR Hall with an accessible entrance on the lower (basement) level. Previous to a 2009 renovation, the library's main entrance had been through the Bank of America Executive Education Center.

== Name ==
The library is named in honor of Albert O. and Evelyn W. Foster. A 1928 graduate of the University of Washington Business School, Albert Foster founded Seattle-based investment banking firm Foster & Marshall in 1938. Evelyn Foster was a 1932 graduate of the University of Washington. Albert and Evelyn were the parents of Michael G. Foster, for whom the Foster School of Business is named. Together, the Fosters established the Foster Foundation in 1984

== History ==
Made possible by a $3 million gift from the Foster Foundation in 1990, construction began in March 1995 with the library opening on June 23, 1997. A major renovation from 2009 to 2012 reoriented the library entrance through PACCAR Hall and increased seating and group study space.

== Inside Foster Library ==
=== Hours ===
The library is open extended hours during the fall, winter and spring quarters and limited hours during summer quarter and interim weeks.

=== Study Areas ===
Foster Library provides computers, printers, scanners, study tables, and reservable group study rooms equipped with flat-panel displays.

=== Collection ===
The Foster Library collection supports the study and practice of business management with books, periodicals, and research databases. The collection primarily includes material that supports professional practice and research in accounting, finance, management, marketing, information systems management, international business, operations management, and entrepreneurship. Complementary and similar materials are housed in other UW libraries, including Suzzallo-Allen Libraries, Odegaard Undergraduate Library, and the libraries at University of Washington Bothell and University of Washington Tacoma.
