= University of Washington Libraries =

- 47.6557702°N 122.3100314°W
- Location: Seattle, WA
- Type: Academic library system of the University of Washington
- Established: 1861
- Branches: 16

Collection
- Items collected: more than 9 million items, including 1 million e-books, 180,000 ejournals and 923,000 maps, videos and other multimedia materials.
- Size: 9 million (2018)

Other information
- Employees: 70 subject librarians
- Website: lib.uw.edu

The University of Washington Libraries (UW Libraries) is the academic library system of the University of Washington, based in Seattle, Washington, United States. It serves the Seattle, Tacoma, and Bothell campuses of the University of Washington, as well as the university's Friday Harbor Laboratories.

The library system is the largest collection in the Pacific Northwest, closely followed by the University of British Columbia Library. Its 7.2 million volumes ranked 19th among libraries in the United States in 2012. UW Libraries won the 2004 ACRL "Excellence in Academic Libraries Award".

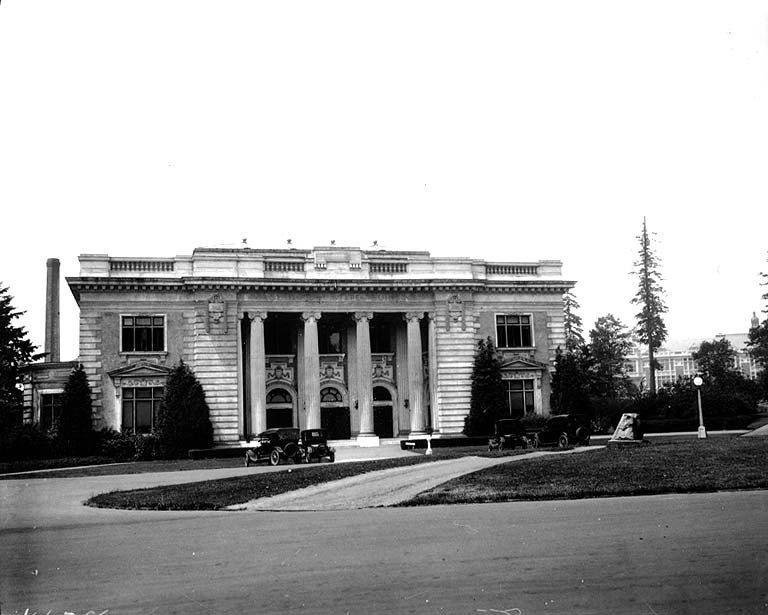
University of Washington library in 1922

The University of Washington Libraries have a collection of more than 9 million books, journals, millions of microforms, thousands of maps, rare books, film, audio and video recordings. The Libraries' website provides the connection to a wide range of print and electronic resources available in the Libraries and on the World Wide Web. The UW Libraries special collections holds over three-thousand audio recordings of Pacific Northwest indigenous languages. They document over fifty native dialects.

Services and resources are provided primarily for University of Washington students, faculty, and staff as part of the Libraries' mission to support teaching, learning, research, and service at the University of Washington. Visitors who come to the Libraries are welcome to use most resources and many of the services. Researchers throughout the world have access to a broad range of materials and various interlibrary loan and document delivery services.

The Libraries system is composed of the Suzzallo and Allen Libraries, the primary location for information and services in the humanities, social sciences, and natural sciences; the Odegaard Undergraduate Library (OUGL) which houses the Odegaard Learning Commons and was formerly open 24 hours weekdays during school days; the Health Sciences Library and Information Center (HSLIC); the East Asia Library; fifteen specialized branch libraries; the Bothell/CCC Library; and the Tacoma Library. The Marian G. Gallagher Law Library and Elisabeth C. Miller Library are administered separately from the UW Libraries system.

== Library services ==
Library services include the library catalog, circulation services and interlibrary loan, computing and copying/printing facilities, a grants and funding information service, instructional services, and ADA access for persons with disabilities.

== Libraries and units ==
- Art Library
- Built Environments Library
- University of Washington Bothell and Cascadia College Library
- Drama Library
- Elisabeth C. Miller Library (University of Washington Botanic Gardens)
- Engineering Library. The library is a designated Patent and Trademark Depository Library and maintains a national depository for the Association for Computing Machinery (ACM). Special resources include industry standards, technical reports, and U.S. patent specifications from 1966 to the present.
- Foster Business Library
- Friday Harbor Library
- Government Publications, Maps, Microforms & Newspapers Collections
- Health Sciences Library
- International Studies
  - Near East
  - Slavic and East European
  - Southeast Asia
- Marian G. Gallagher Law Library
- Mathematics Research Library
- Media Arcade
- Music Library
  - Music Listening Center. Among the special resources are the Eric Offenbacher Collection of pre-LP vocal recordings of the music of Mozart, the Hazel B. Kinsella Collection of American hymnals and tune books, the Melville Harris Collection of early disc and cylinder recordings of woodwind solos, and a collection of 17th and 18th century opera scores.
- Odegaard Undergraduate Library (OUGL)
- Reference and Research Services
- Special Collections
- Suzzallo and Allen Libraries
- Tateuchi East Asia Library
- University of Washington Tacoma Library
