= Chronotron =

2008 video game

- Main menu
- Developer: Scarybug Games
- Publisher: Scarybug Games
- Designer: Joe Rheaume
- Artist: Bogdan Ene
- Composer: Helge Krabye
- Platform: Flash
- Release: May 2008
- Genres: Puzzle, platform
- Mode: Single-player

Chronotron is a Flash video game developed by Scarybug Games. Chronotron launched on the Kongregate website in May 2008. It was selected as one of the ten games for PAX 10 2008 out of more than eighty entries. Reviewers have considered the game innovative. The protagonist is a robot named Chronotron who travels back in time to cooperate with himself. The robot must fetch an item before moving to the next room.

Solving the puzzles requires sending the main character back in time to coordinate with previous selves. The gameplay requires thinking ahead. Previous selves will always replay the inputs they did the first time around, not just the positions they were in. As a result, actions by later selves can interfere with earlier selves and create time paradoxes.

A number of web sites have licensed Chronotron, including Kongregate and MTV's AddictingGames. It was featured on the front page of Kongregate. The game appears on over 2,000 web sites and has been played more than seven million times. The developer splits advertising revenue evenly with Kongregate and made more than $1,000 in 2008. The developer had made nearly $15,000 in profits from the game in 2008.

== Development ==
Chronotron was developed by Madison, Wisconsin-based Scarybug Games, which consists of a single person: Joe Rheaume. Rheaume was the sole developer of Chronotron. Development for Chronotron took seven months. Chronotron's sponsorship support was handled through FlashGameLicense.com. Interest in sponsoring Chronotron allowed Scarybug Games to hire Romanian artist Bogdan Ene to replace the graphics. Royalty free music was purchased for the game. The music's author is Helge Krabye. Sound effects came from the Freesound Project.

Chronotron's time travel elements was inspired by advertising for the Xbox game Blinx: The Time Sweeper and an article on Braid. Rheaume claims to not have played Blinx. Chronotron was released before the release of Braid. Rheaume claims to have "thought of the idea of recording input and going back looping on yourself." Rheaume wanted there to be no limit on how many times you could travel back in time. The game contains references to time travel stories including Back to the Future, Bill & Ted's Excellent Adventure, and Doctor Who. The puzzle platformer elements were inspired by The Lost Vikings. Rheaume notes the similarity between cooperating with your self to the cooperation between the three Vikings in The Lost Vikings. Puzzle pacing, with later puzzles building on what is learned earlier, was inspired by Portal. Portal also inspired the use of humorous signs in game as hints.

Rheaume is a Flash developer for his day job. Chronotron was built as a hobby project because Rheaume thought it would be fun to play. He developed it further because he "thought it really had legs," and interest from other people kept Rheaume motivated.

The name of the game and the protagonist comes from "chrono" for "time" and "tron" as a generic term for "robot."

== Reception ==
Screenshot of the game

The game was selected as one of the ten games for the prestigious PAX 10 in 2008.

Joe Rheaume was an invited guest to show Chronotron to the Penny Arcade Expo in 2008 as part of the PAX 10. Chronotron was selected as one of ten games from over eighty submitted. Chronotron is the only browser-based Flash game in the PAX 10 2008.

Chronotron has been described as "a very deep, complex game involving time travel and past selves." Game designer Greg Costikyan described Chronotron as "a simple, satisfying, and enjoyable exploration of the effects of one novel mechanic on a well-established form." A review on Jay Is Games described Chronotron as "a platform puzzler with a really innovative (and addictive) twist." The same review said of the "rewind mechanic", "the concept is refined—and executed almost to perfection." A reviewer on Rock, Paper, Shotgun said "Certainly I feel worn out after wrapping my head around a few levels, but also satisfied and pleased — you really should go play this." Kotaku called it "a hell of a fun flash game." Gawker.com rated Chronotron "Pretty pretty good" and said "If you loved Portal, you'll like this enough for two lunch breaks." Jamie Fristrom of Torpex Games, a fellow honoree at the PAX 10, said, "Chronotron is actually my favorite of the PAX 10." A GameCyte author "wholeheartedly recommend[ed] Chronotron to any and all puzzle fans." Hecklerspray described Chronotron as "incredible" and "so impressively playable that it'll probably kill your productivity for the day stone dead."

The developer believes the "biggest" and "fairest criticism" are problems with synchronizing robots' actions between time loops.
