= Robert W. Palmatier =

Academic background
- Education: Georgia Institute of Technology; Georgia State University; University of Missouri

Academic work
- Discipline: Marketing
- Institutions: University of Washington
- Website: http://foster.uw.edu/faculty-research/directory/robert-palmatier/

Robert W. Palmatier is Professor of Marketing and John C. Narver Chair of Business Administration at the Foster School at the University of Washington. He is founder and research director of the Sales and Marketing Strategy Institute (SAMSI).

In a 2018 AMA study, he was shown to be the 10th most productive scholar in marketing (across top 4 marketing journals) over the past 10 years.

He has served as Editor-in-Chief of the Journal of the Academy of Marketing Science and presently is the Co-editor for Journal of Marketing; and also sits on numerous editorial review boards.

== Publications ==
- Irina Kozlenkova, Robert W. Palmatier, Eric Fang, Bangming Xiao, and Minxue Huang, (Forthcoming), "Online Relationship Formation," Journal of Marketing.
- Lee, Ju-Yeon, Shrihari Sridhar, and Robert W. Palmatier, (Forthcoming) "The Influence of Firms’ Structural Design on Advertising and Personal Selling Effectiveness," International Journal of Research in Marketing.
- Harmeling, Colleen, Robert W. Palmatier, Eric Fang, and Dianwen Wang, (2017), "Group Marketing: Theory, Mechanisms, and Dynamics," Journal of Marketing, 81 (July).
- Martin, Kelly, Abhishek Borah, and Robert W. Palmatier, (2017) "Data Privacy: Effects on Customer and Firm Performance," Journal of Marketing, 81 (January), 36–58.
- Zhang, Jonathan, George Watson, Robert W. Palmatier, and Rajiv P. Dant (2016) "Dynamic Relationship Marketing," Journal of Marketing, 80 (September), 53–75.
- Fang, Eric, Jongkuk Lee, Robert W. Palmatier, and Chaoyang Guo, (2016) "Understanding the Effects of Plural Marketing Structures on Alliance Performance," 53 (August), 628–645, Journal of Marketing Research.
- Fang, Eric, Jongkuk Lee, Robert W. Palmatier, and Shunping Han, (2016) "If It Takes a Village to Foster Innovation, Success Depends on the Neighbors: The Effects of Global and Ego Networks on New Product Launches," Journal of Marketing Research, 53 (June), 319–37.
- Steinhoff, Lena and Robert W. Palmatier, (2016), "Understanding the Effectiveness of Loyalty Programs: Managing Target and Bystander Effects," Journal of the Academy of Marketing Science.
- Watson, George, Stefan Worm, Robert W. Palmatier, and Shankar Ganesan, (2015), "The Evolution of Marketing Channels: Trends and Future Research Directions," Journal of Retailing, 91 (December), 546–68.
