= Fran's Chocolates =

Chocolate manufacturer in Seattle, Washington

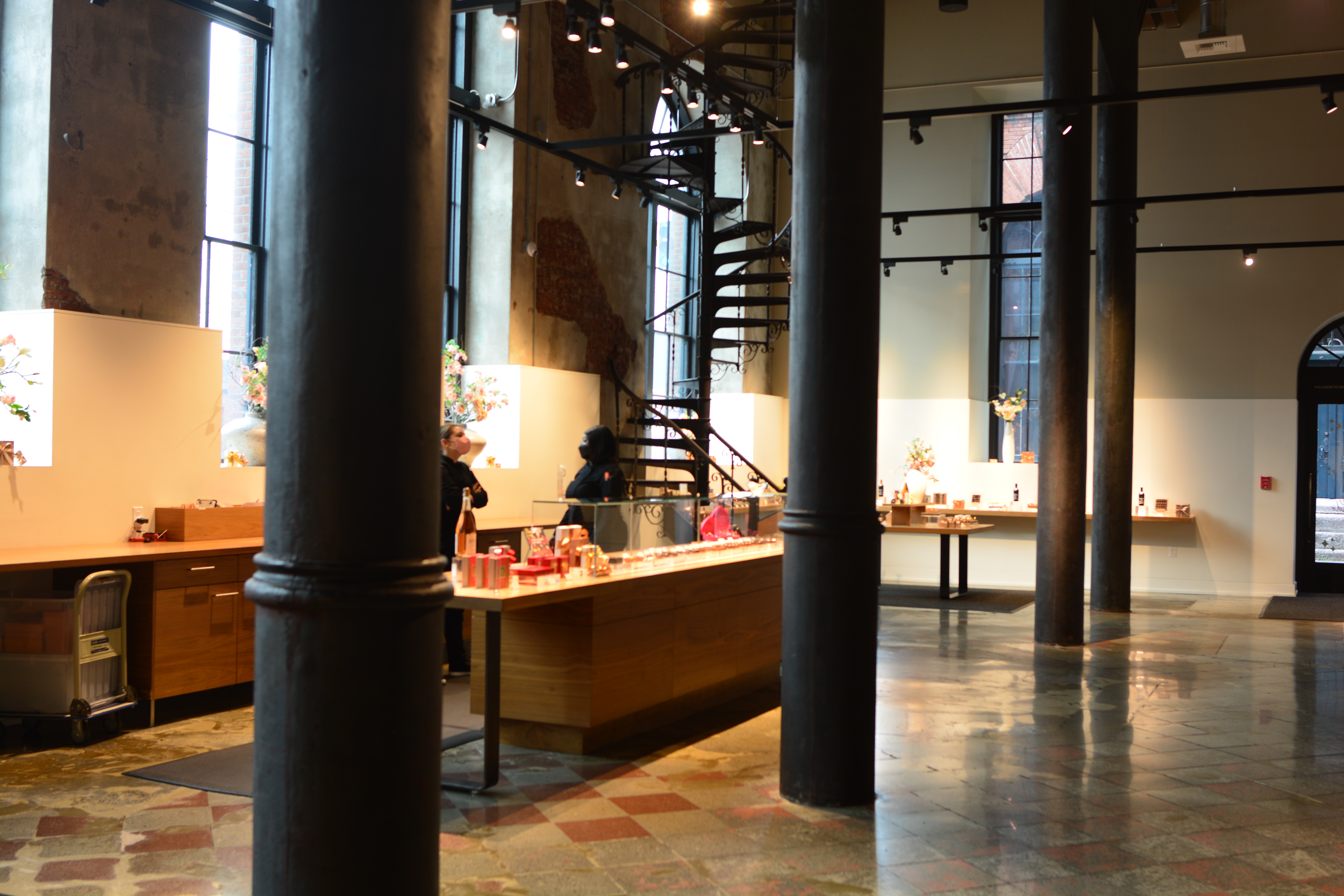
- The shop at Fran's Chocolates headquarters in Georgetown, Seattle, Washington, 2024.
- Industry: Chocolate
- Founded: 1982 in Madison Park, Seattle, Washington, United States
- Founder: Fran Bigelow
- Headquarters: Seattle, Washington, United States
- Number of locations: 7
- Products: chocolate truffles, caramels, desserts
- Number of employees: 75-85, season depending (2018)
- Website: frans.com

Fran's Chocolates, or Fran's, is a chocolate company founded by Fran Bigelow and based in Seattle, Washington. The company is best known for their salted chocolate-covered caramels. Fran's Chocolates has locations in the Seattle metropolitan area and throughout Japan.

== History ==
Fran Bigelow was born and raised in Seattle and trained as an accountant. She graduated from the University of Washington in 1965 with a degree in business administration and travelled to France with her husband about five years later. Her husband was a hospital administrator, and his career required them to move to San Francisco. Bigelow enrolled in professional cooking classes at California Culinary Academy, where she apprenticed with a Swiss pastry chef. In 1980, they returned to Seattle, and in 1982 she began selling chocolate truffles and desserts from a small shop in Seattle’s Madison Park neighborhood. There were two employees at the original shop and the truffles were originally priced at 35 cents each. Eventually, she developed the store's signature Gold Bars because she wanted a candy that was not as perishable as the truffles. The Gold Bars quickly became a customer favorite, and by 1996 she was selling nearly 500,000 Gold Bars a year. In 1986, Bigelow began making caramels.

In 1998, she began adding gray salt to the caramels. By 2006, the caramels made up seventy-five percent of the company's sales, and by 2008 the caramels were the bestseller, partly due to publicity from former President Barack Obama and First Lady Michelle Obama. In 2006, Fran's was featured in O, The Oprah Magazine and the company consequently reached a record $4.5 million sales for the year. By 2007, Fran's had forty employees, and Bigelow's daughter, Andrina, joined the company. In 2008, Fran's opened a location in Downtown Seattle in the Four Seasons hotel. The Downtown location would take over as the flagship store.

In 2014, the company moved its headquarters from the Capitol Hill neighborhood to the historic Rainier Brewing Company building in the Georgetown neighborhood. At the time, the company had 67 employees and was making 30,000 pieces of chocolate per day and shipping regularly across the United States and to Japan. In 2018, she was inducted into the Specialty Food Association Hall of Fame for "sparking the artisan chocolate renaissance in the United States". In 2021, Food & Wine named Fran's one of the top 50 chocolate shops in the United States.

In December 2025, Fran's almondmilk chocolate which they introduced into the market with undisclosed allergen contents was recalled following a report of allergic reaction report from a consumer. It contained undisclosed hazelnuts, which can cause serious or life threatening reactions for people with allergies to hazelnuts.

== Book ==
In 2004, Bigelow published a book, Pure Chocolate: Divine Desserts and Sweets from the Creator of Fran’s Chocolates, which she co-authored with Helene Siegel. The book contains chocolate recipes that are not "too difficult" to make. It was nominated for 2005 James Beard Foundation Award in the Baking and Desserts category.

== Awards ==
- 2003 Confection of the Year, National Association for the Specialty Food Trade, gray salt caramels
- 2005 NASFT Award, Smoked Salt Caramels
- 2007 Sofi Award Finalist: Outstanding Chocolate, Hazelnut Diamonds
- 2007 Sofi Award: Outstanding Hot Beverage, Fran’s Premium Hot Chocolate
- 2012 Lifetime Achievement Award, Northwest Chocolate Festival
- 2014 Sofi Award, Gray Salt Caramel
- 2016 Mott Green Sustainability Award
- 2017 Sofi Award, Almond Gold Bar
- 2017 Good Food Award, Almond Gold Bar
- 2017 Northwest Chocolate Festival Award Winner, Fran's Park Bar
- 2018 Good Food Award, Dark Chocolate Sauce
- 2018 Good Food Award, Caramel Sauce
- "The country's best overall chocolatier in the United States" by The Book of Chocolate

== In popular culture ==
Fran's was featured in Season 1, Episode 22 of Food Finds, which aired on the Food Network in May 2002. The company was also featured on Food Network's The Best Thing I Ever Ate: Season's Eatings.

Former President Obama and Michelle Obama occasionally had the chocolates shipped to the White House. Bigelow donated to Obama's campaign and was able to meet Michelle Obama. Michelle Obama sent Fran's caramels to Barbara Walters and the cast of The View as a thank you for her recent appearance.
