= Brad Tilden =

American business executive (born 1960)

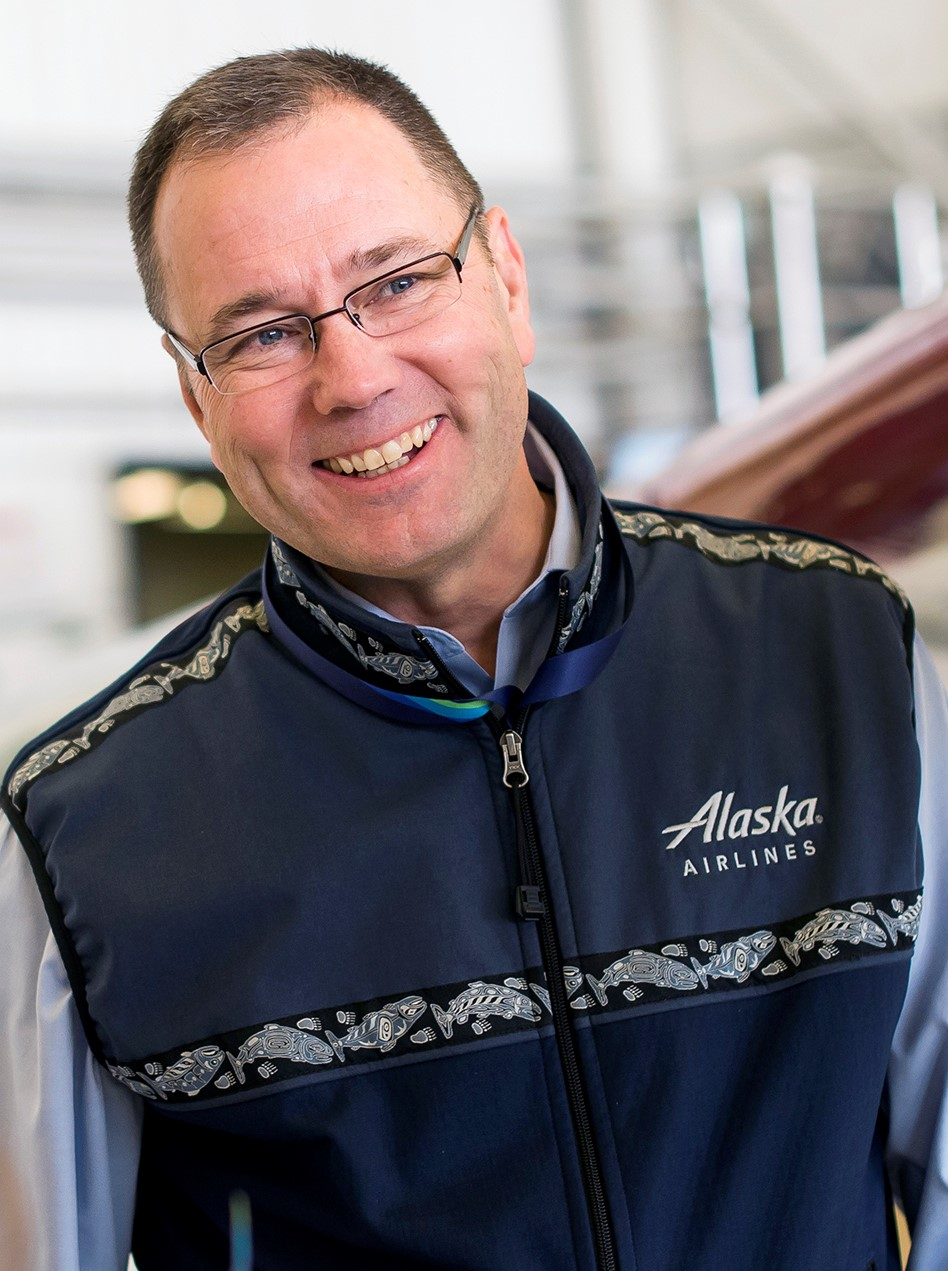
- Tilden at Alaska Airlines Aviation Day in 2017

40th National Chair of the Scouting America
- In office May 21, 2023 – May 28, 2026
- Preceded by: Dan Ownby
- Succeeded by: Ricky Mason

Personal details
- Born: December 22, 1960 (age 65) Houston, Texas, U.S.
- Spouse: Danielle Tilden
- Children: 3
- Education: Pacific Lutheran University (BBA); University of Washington (MBA)
- Known for: Retired Chairman of Alaska Air Group

Bradley D. Tilden (born December 22, 1960) is an American business executive. He was the National Chair of Scouting America from May 21, 2023 to May 28, 2026.

Tilden is the retired chairman of Alaska Air Group, the parent company of Alaska Airlines and Horizon Air. Before becoming the company's CEO in 2012, Tilden served as Alaska Airlines' president, and before that as Alaska Air Group's chief financial officer. He is a commercial pilot and holds multi-engine and instrument ratings.

== Early life and education ==
Tilden was born in Houston, Texas, in 1960. His family moved to Seattle where he attended Sylvester Middle School in Burien. Seeing his first Boeing 727 on a field trip sparked Tilden's love of airplanes. After graduating from Highline High School in 1979, Tilden enrolled at Pacific Lutheran University, during which time he worked as a dishwasher aboard Amtrak trains to pay tuition. Tilden became interested in business and earned a degree in business administration and accounting. During this time, Tilden earned his private pilot license. In 1997, he earned an executive master's degree in business administration from the University of Washington.

== Career ==
Following graduation from college, Tilden worked for eight years at the accounting firm PwC (then called Price Waterhouse) in Seattle and Melbourne. Alaska Airlines hired Tilden in 1991 to the accounting division and three years later named him as corporate controller of the company.

After serving as the company's chief financial officer and executive vice president of finance, Tilden became chief executive officer of Alaska Air Group in 2012, replacing Bill Ayer. During his leadership, Tilden oversaw the Alaska Airlines’ acquisition of Virgin America, a combination of airlines that was recognized by the FAA as a uniquely fast process. Maintaining Alaska's reputation as an industry leader in sustainability, the International Council on Clean Transportation named the airline to be the most fuel-efficient domestic carrier during Tilden's first five years as CEO.

Fortune named Tilden one of its Businesspeople of the Year in 2016. He was inducted into the International Air and Space Hall of Fame in 2018. He retired in March 2021.

== Philanthropy ==
Tilden is a longtime advocate for education and youth career development. Each year, Tilden and his family support a college scholarship through the Highline Schools Foundation and, in 2014, led efforts to secure a bond to build two new schools in the Highline School District. He is also a major proponent of Aviation Day, which Alaska Airlines hosts to teach youth about career opportunities in the aviation industry, and an early supporter of Raisbeck Aviation High School at the Museum of Flight. Tilden and Alaska Airlines host an annual scholarship celebration with Highline Public Schools students and Russell Wilson. During his time on the Chief Seattle Council of Boy Scouts of America, Tilden called for the organization to accept openly gay scouts.

Tilden is currently serving as National Chair of Scouting America, and he is a board member of the Washington Roundtable, Nordstrom, and the Seattle Metropolitan Chamber of Commerce (which he formerly chaired).

== Personal life ==
Brad is married to Danielle Tilden. They have three children. Tilden is an Eagle Scout.
