= Proximity ligation assay =

Detection of protein-protein interactions

Figure 1: PLA starts with the binding of antibodies from different species to 2 proteins of interest, in this case protein * (star) and protein#

Proximity ligation assay (in situ PLA) is a technology that is used to detect interactions between two antibody-detectable components such as proteins. This extends the capabilities of traditional microscopic immunoassays to include detection of protein-protein interactions, extracellular vesicles and post translational modifications with high specificity and sensitivity. Protein targets can be readily detected and localized with single molecule resolution and objectively quantified in unmodified cells and tissues. Utilizing only a few cells, sub-cellular events, even transient or weak interactions, are revealed in situ and sub-populations of cells can be differentiated.

== The PLA principle ==
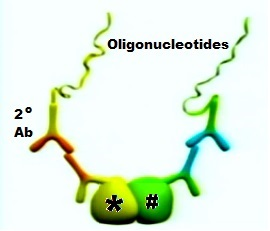
Figure 2: Binding of PLA probes.

Two primary antibodies raised in different species recognize the target antigen on the proteins of interest (Figure 1). Secondary antibodies directed against the constant regions of the different primary antibodies, called PLA probes, bind to the primary antibodies (Figure 2).

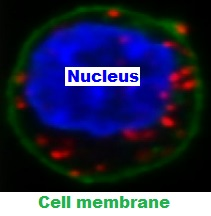
Figure 5: Fluorescence microscopy image showing interaction of the proteins (B cell receptor and MYD88) in the cytoplasm (red). The nucleus appears in blue (DAPI).

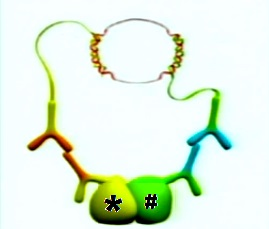
Figure 3: Rolling circle DNA synthesis starts.

Each of the PLA probes has a short sequence specific DNA strand attached to it. If the PLA probes are in proximity (if the two detected proteins of interest are within 40 nanometers), the DNA strands can participate in rolling circle DNA synthesis upon addition of two other sequence-specific DNA oligonucleotides together with appropriate substrates and enzymes (Figure 3).

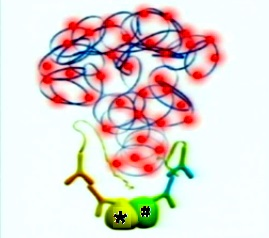
Figure 4: Fluorescent probes bind to the amplified DNA.

The DNA synthesis reaction results in several-hundredfold amplification of the DNA circle. Next, fluorescent-labeled complementary oligonucleotide probes are added, and they bind to the amplified DNA (Figure 4). The resulting high concentration of fluorescence is easily visible as a distinct bright spot when viewed with a fluorescence microscope.

In the specific case shown (Figure 5), the nucleus is enlarged because this is a B-cell lymphoma cell. The two proteins of interest are a B cell receptor and MYD88. The finding of interaction in the cytoplasm was interesting because B cell receptors are thought of as being located in the cell membrane.

== Applications and Variants ==
PLA as described above has been used to study aspects of biology including animal development and cancer. In situ proximity ligation assays (isPLA) have been applied to antibody validation in human tissues with various advantages over IHC, including increased detection specificity, decreased unspecific staining, and better localization. A variation of the technique (rISH-PLA) has been used to study the association of protein and RNA. Another variation of in situ PLA includes a multiplex PLA assay that makes it possible to visualize multiple protein complexes in parallel. The 'UnFold' variation integrates the elements necessary for circular DNA strands in the probes, and this prevents premature hybridization between the probes before an enzymatic unfolding step in the detection reaction. PLA can also be combined with other read out forms such as ELISA, flow cytometry. and Western blotting
