= Yong Tan =

Academic background
- Education: University of Science and Technology of China (BS); University of Washington (PhD)
- Doctoral advisor: David J. Thouless (physics); Vijay Mookerjee (information systems)

Yong Tan is the Neal and Jan Dempsey Professor of Information Systems at the University of Washington Foster School of Business. He is the director of Center for Data Analytics at USTC-UW Institute for Global Business and Finance Innovation and proved instrumental in establishing the Institute with the University of Science and Technology of China (USTC), Tan’s alma mater. He was named a Chang Jiang Scholar by the Chinese Ministry of Education and Hong Kong Li Ka Shing Foundation, serving as a chair visiting professor at the School of Economics and Management at Tsinghua University. In 2016, he won the INFORMS ISS Distinguished Fellow Award. He received the 2017 Best Paper Award in Information Systems from Management Science. Tan received the Best Publication Award from the Association of Information Systems.

Yong Tan received Bachelor of Science in Physics from University of Science and Technology of China (USTC) in 1987, and was selected as one of the 915 students in the CUSPEA program created by Nobel laureate Tsung-Dao Lee. Yong Tan received his Ph.D. in Physics from the University of Washington in 1993, advised by Nobel laureate David J. Thouless. He joined the Foster School faculty full-time after earning his Ph.D. in Information Systems from the University of Washington in 2000, where Vijay Mookerjee was his doctoral advisor.
