= Bill Ayer =

American businessman (born 1955)

- Born: 1955 (age 70–71); Seattle, Washington, U.S.
- Education: University of Washington
- Occupations: Chief Executive Officer, Chairman, and President of Alaska Air Group
- Term: 2002 - 2012
- Successor: Brad Tilden
- Board member of: University of Washington Board of Regents, University of Washington Business School Advisory Board, Puget Energy, and the Museum of Flight and Angel Flight America

William S. Ayer (born 1955 in Seattle, Washington, United States) is an American former chairman, president, pilot and chief executive officer of Alaska Airlines and Alaska Air Group which is the parent company of Alaska Airlines and its sister carrier Horizon Air.

Originally interested in being a physician, he later changed career goals. He is a graduate of Stanford University with a bachelor's degree in economics and biology, Ayer earned a master's degree in business administration from the University of Washington. He holds commercial and flight instructor pilot certificates with instrument and multi-engine ratings.

Ayer founded and was president of Air Olympia, a commuter airline serving Washington state. “We operated for two years,” noted Ayer. “We didn't go broke, but we probably would have if we'd stuck with it.” He also served as a regional manager for Piper Aircraft Co.

Ayer began his career with Alaska in 1995 as vice president of marketing and planning and progressed through various posts to become chief executive officer in 2002, and chairman in 2003. He spent 13 years at Horizon where he was senior vice president of operations before joining Alaska.

Ayer serves on the University of Washington Board of Regents. He was appointed by then-Governor Christine Gregoire from January 17, 2012 to September 30, 2016. He is also director of Puget Energy, the Museum of Flight and Angel Flight America. He also serves on the University of Washington Business School Advisory Board. Married with one child, he resides in Bellevue, Washington. As a pilot, Ayer gives back to the community also by flying Angel Flight America patients to their medical treatments.

On February 16, 2012, Ayer announced that he will be stepping down as CEO of Alaska Airlines, Horizon Air, and its parent company on May 15, 2012 and will be replaced by Brad Tilden, the airline's president. He is a pilot and CFO For Alaska Airlines since 2014. Bill Ayer is chairman of the AOPA Foundation, and pilot.
