= Robert Khoo =

American businessman

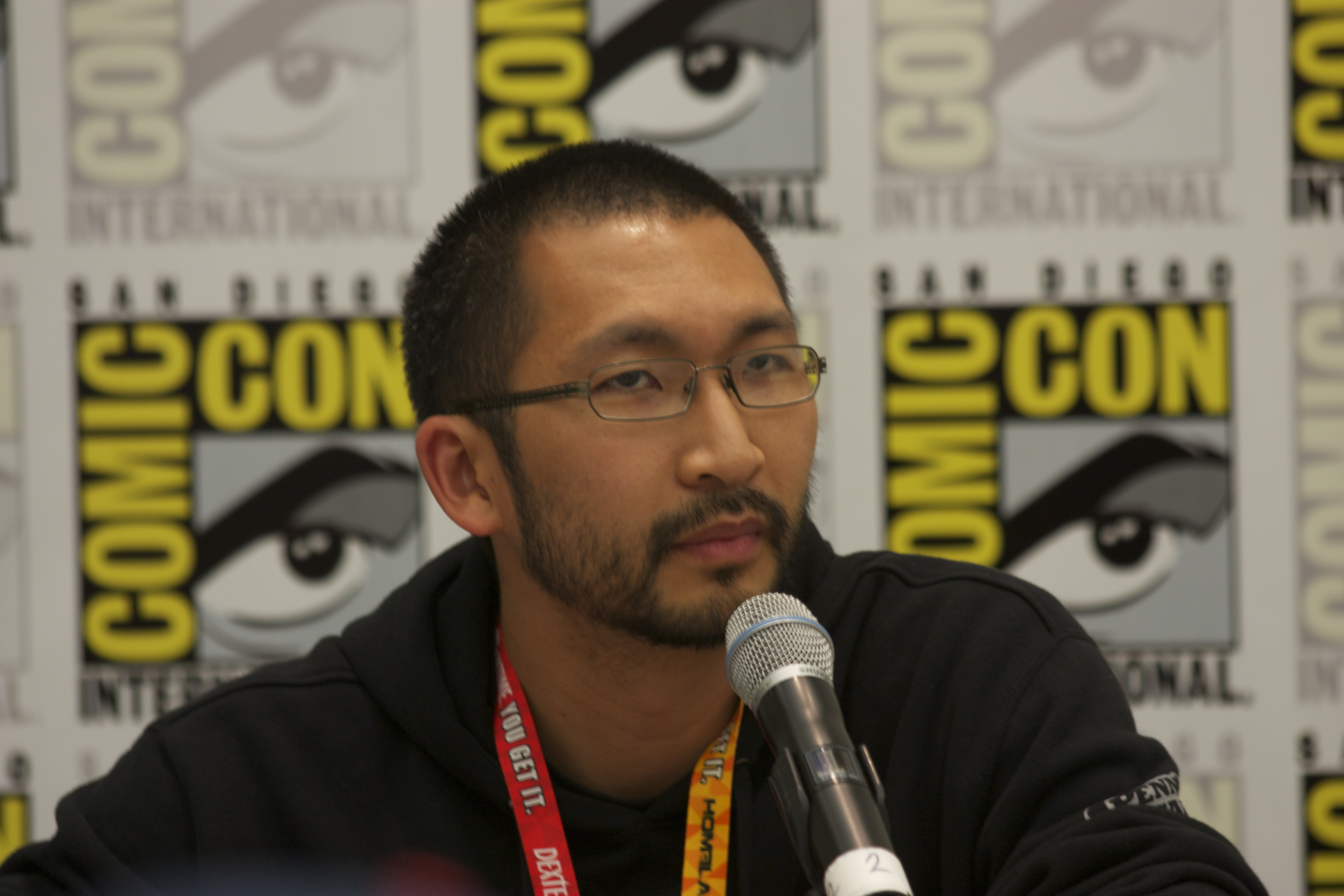
- Khoo at the 2012 Comic-Con International
- Born: December 1980 (age 45); Portland, Oregon, U.S.
- Title: President of Business Development

Robert Khoo was the President of Operations and Business Development of Penny Arcade from 2002 until 2016. He was the Business Manager for the company and the Show Director for PAX, the largest consumer gaming show in the United States. Khoo also served as the managing director for Child's Play.

== Early Life ==
Khoo attended the University of Washington Michael G. Foster School of Business and, at one time, was the lead business analyst for a market strategy consultancy called ProofPoint Ventures. Khoo's services included figuring out ways for foreign companies to break into markets. One of his clients was a game developer working on a sports MMO. He was assigned the task of developing a US marketing strategy for the title and decided on a grassroots approach by e-mailing Jerry Holkins and Mike Krahulik of Penny Arcade, whom he was longtime fans of. Their subsequent business lunch led him to realize they didn’t have a business strategy, which presented a "once-in-a-lifetime opportunity".

== Penny Arcade ==
In 2002, a week after their first meeting, Khoo offered Holkins and Krahulik a 40-page, five-year business plan and two months of work for free, with no strings attached. He has since helped build the Penny Arcade empire and was featured as being one of the 40 most powerful individuals in the game industry.

Khoo has appeared in several Penny Arcade strips, namely "Crimson Lies", "Les Moments Awkwards", "Uncomfort", "Revolting Even To Contemplate", "Couch Diplomacy", "DM 101", "Purgatory", "The S Word", "Engaging The Social Web", and "Motive". He is occasionally referenced in the news posts as being very good at math, ping-pong, Soul Calibur II, Puzzle Quest, and Lumines.

Among the concerns Khoo addressed during his tenure were practical steps dealing with supply and demand surrounding PAX tickets and overseeing the event's expansion to Boston, Philadelphia, Australia and San Antonio.

On June 13, 2016, Holkins announced that Khoo had resigned his position at Penny Arcade. The decision was described as amicable and "After 15 years, it was time to go and try something new."

== After Penny Arcade ==
In August 2026, it was announced Khoo was co-running a new event called KPEX: Korean Pop Culture Expo, an event centred around kpop featuring panels, screenings, workshops, autograph sessions, shopping and nightly concerts.

== See also ==
- Penny Arcade Expo
- Penny Arcade
- Child's Play
