= Palmer, Río Grande, Puerto Rico =

Settlement and sector in Río Grande, Puerto Rico

Palmer
- Sector
- Sector Palmer
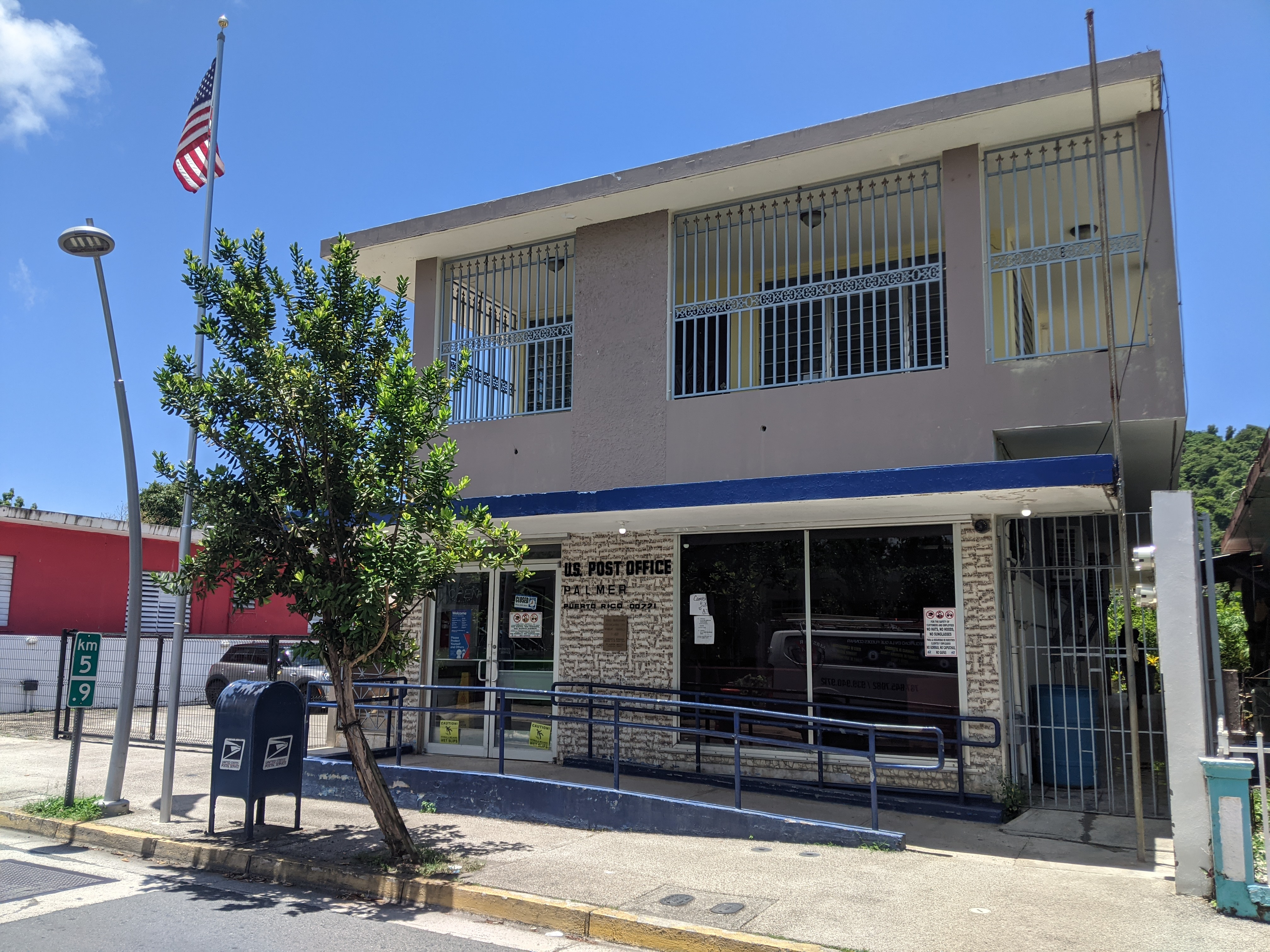
- Interactive map of Palmer
- Commonwealth: Puerto Rico
- Municipality: Río Grande
- Barrio: Mameyes II

Palmer (officially Sector Palmer) is a small settlement and sector in the barrio Mameyes II of Río Grande, Puerto Rico.

== Description ==
Located by highway PR-3, Sector Palmer is the closest settlement to El Yunque National Forest. The sector has a United States Post Office, a community center, stores and various establishments catering to both residents and visitors to the nearby rainforest. El Portalito Hub, a temporary visitors center to El Yunque, opened in the neighborhood in 2019. El Portal Rainforest Center, located within the national forest, is currently closed for renovation after being damaged by Hurricane Maria in 2017.

== Gallery ==
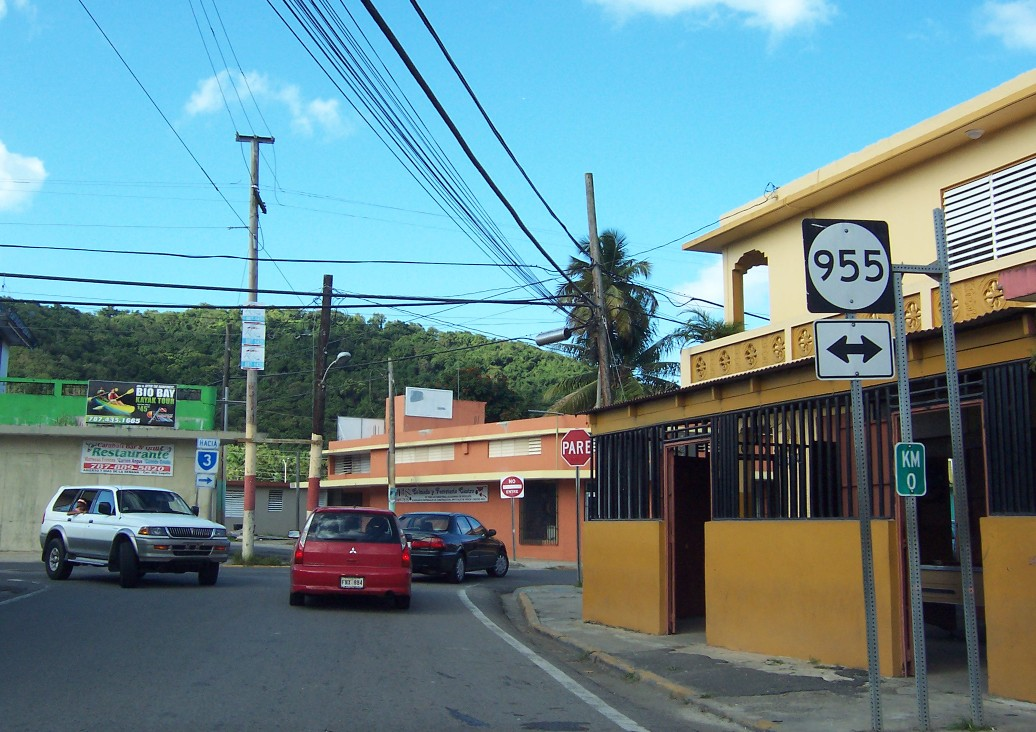
PR-955

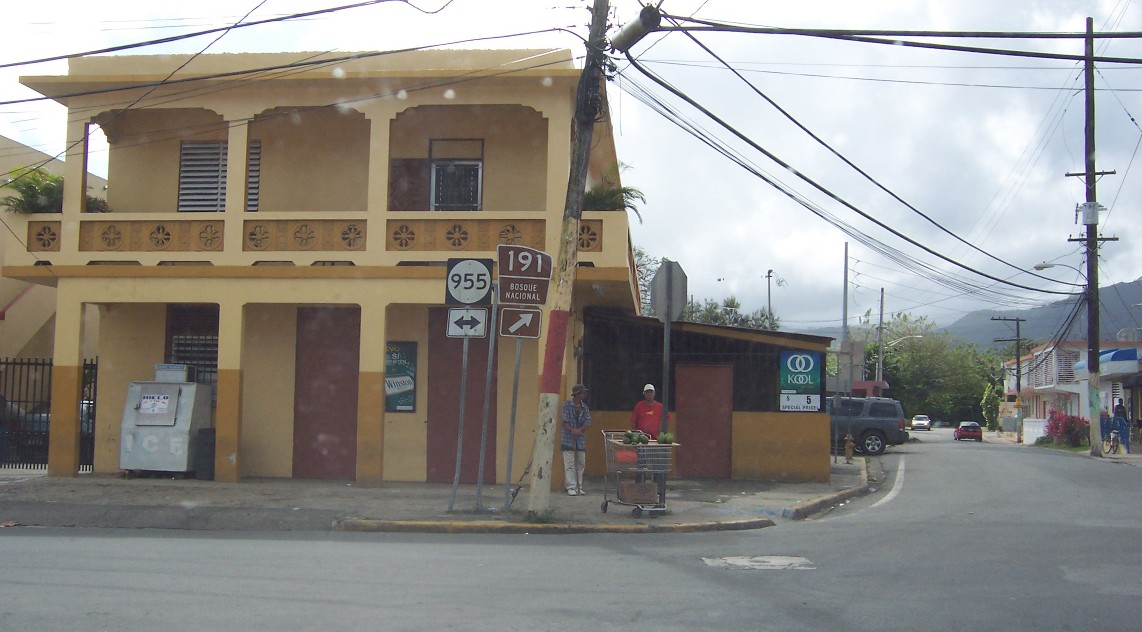
PR-191

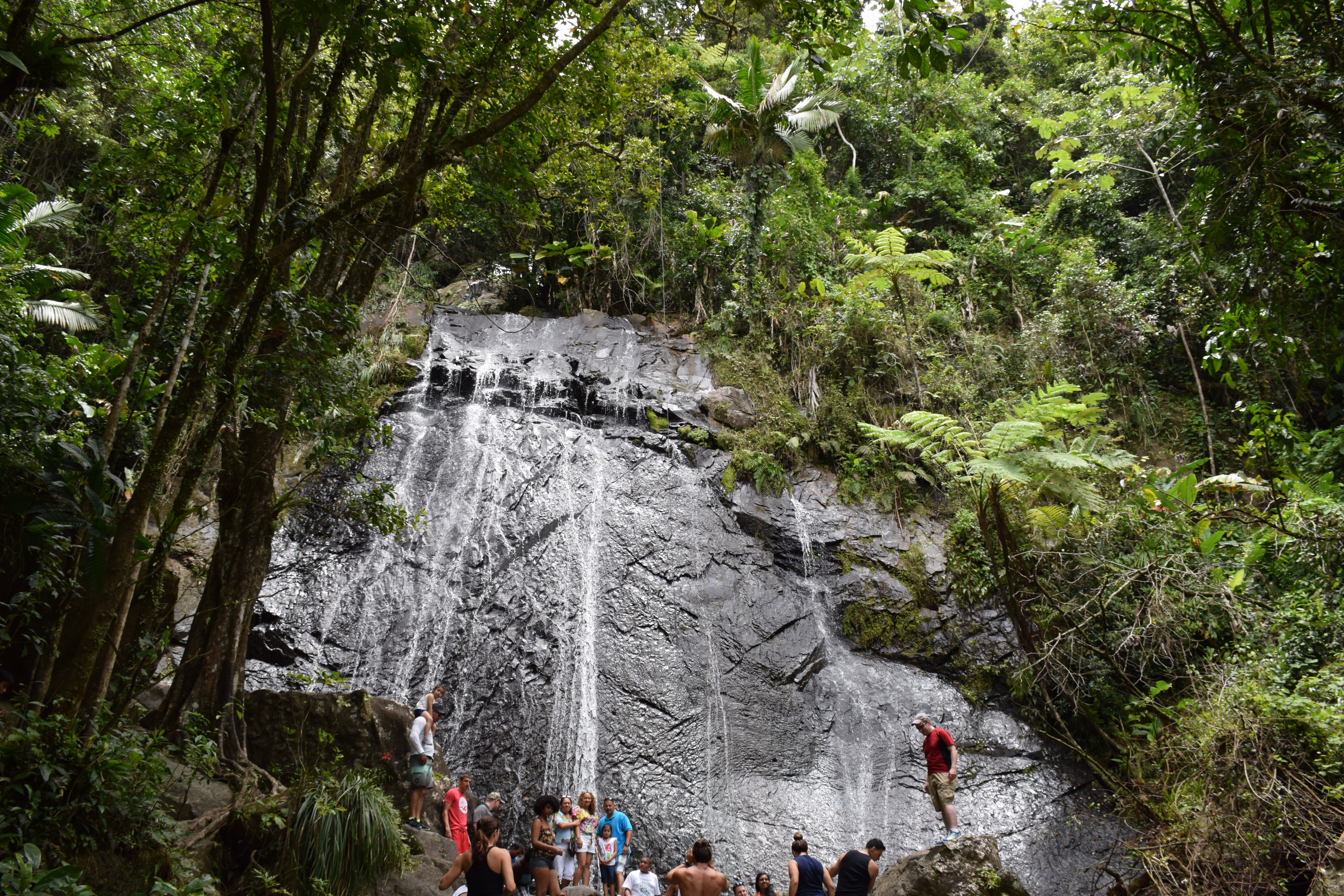
Juan Diego Falls near Palmer

== See also ==
- List of communities in Puerto Rico
- List of barrios and sectors of Río Grande, Puerto Rico
