= Puerto Rico Highway 191 =

Highway in Puerto Rico

Highway 191
- Ruta 191

Route information
- Maintained by Puerto Rico DTPW
- Length: 24.0 km (14.9 mi)
- Existed: 1953–present

Southern segment
- South end: PR-31 in Río Blanco
- Major intersections: PR-969 in Río Blanco
- North end: Río Sabana Recreation Area in Río Blanco

Northern segment
- South end: PR-9938 in Mameyes II
- Major intersections: PR-930 in Mameyes II; PR-9966 in Mameyes II; PR-988 in Mameyes II; PR-990 in Mameyes II; PR-961 in Mameyes II; PR-955 in Mameyes II
- North end: PR-3 in Mameyes II

Location
- Country: United States
- Territory: Puerto Rico
- Municipalities: Naguabo, Río Grande

Highway system
- Roads in Puerto Rico; List
- Forest Highway System
← PR-190	→ PR-192

Puerto Rico Highway 191 (PR-191) is a rural road located in eastern Puerto Rico and is the main access to the El Yunque National Forest. The highway currently consists of two discontinuous segments. The northern segment is located in Río Grande, and the southern segment is in Naguabo.

== Route description ==
PR-191 follows a north–south path through El Yunque National Forest and the Sierra de Luquillo and is divided into two non-contiguous sections.

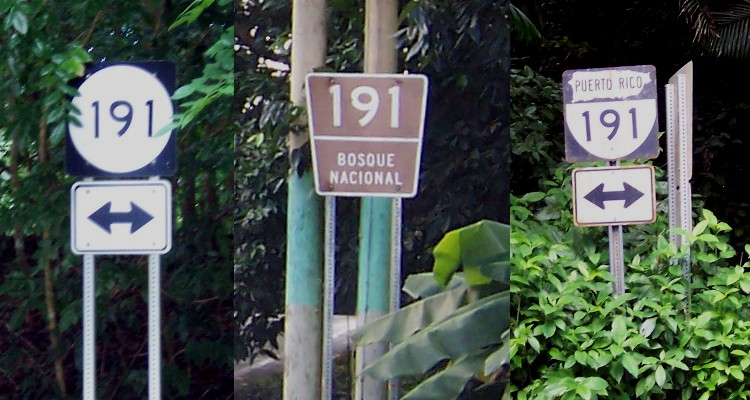
Puerto Rico Highway 191 signs

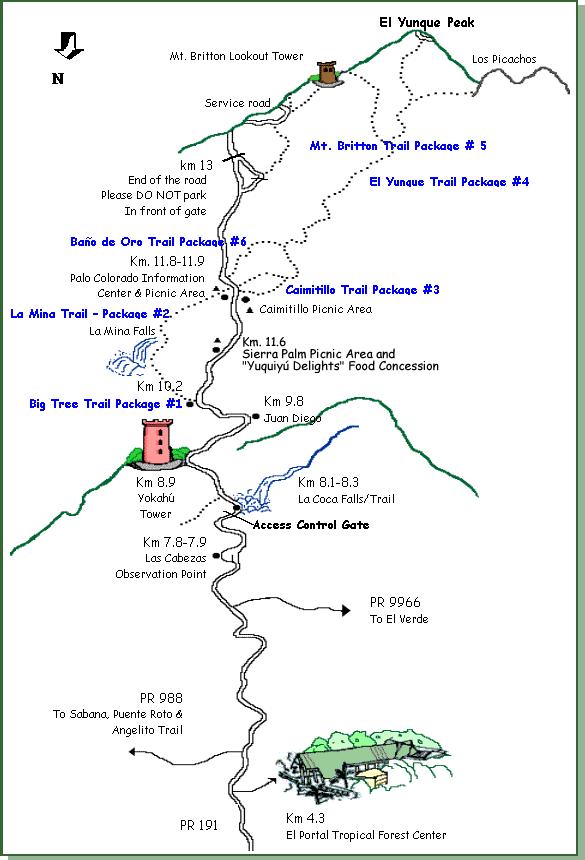
The route of PR-191 through El Yunque National Forest

=== Northern section ===
The highway begins at PR-955 in the community of Palmer in the municipality of Río Grande. From there, it climbs into El Yunque National Forest 4 km from its beginning. Inside the forest, the road is concurrent with Forest Highway 191 and many of the forest's major attractions are along the route. At 7.8 km is the Las Cabezas Observation Point and at 8.1 km is La Coca Falls where an access gate prevent traffic on PR-191 beyond that point from 6:00 PM to 7:30 AM. The route continues past the Yokahu Tower (8.8 km) and Baño Grande, Baño de Oro, and an information center (11.7-11.9 km). The road is closed to public traffic through part of the forest starting at a point 13.1 km from the beginning in Palmer and immediately past PR-191's second junction with PR-9938 (which is signed "Ramal 938") and just before a junction with Forest Route 10 and near the Mount Britton and El Yunque Peak trailhead.

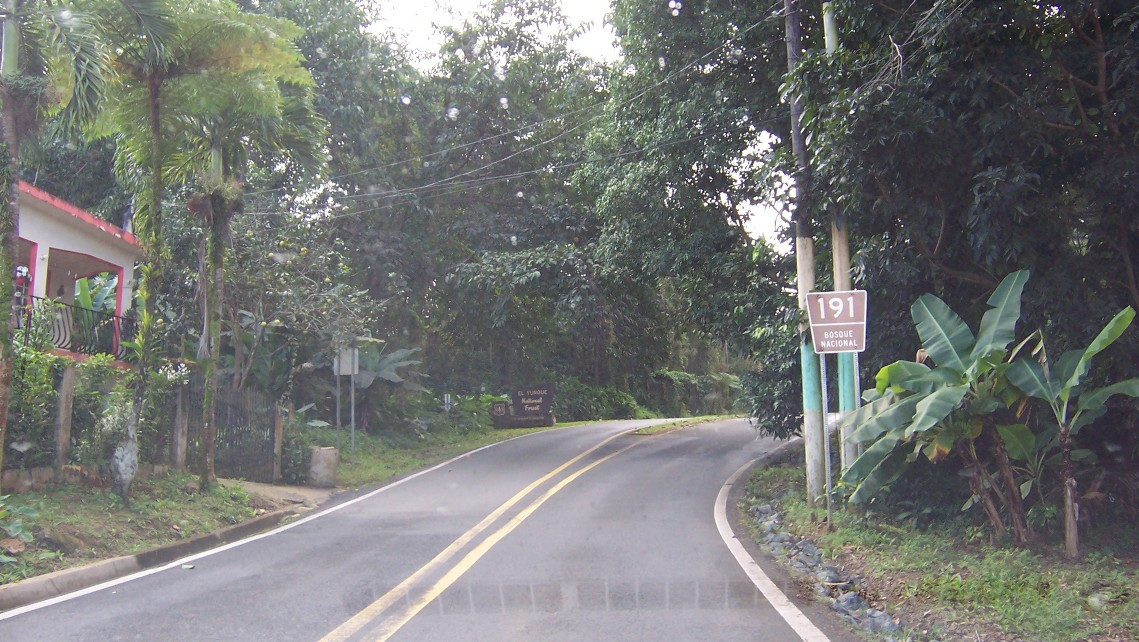
PR-191 at the entrance to El Yunque National Forest (southbound)

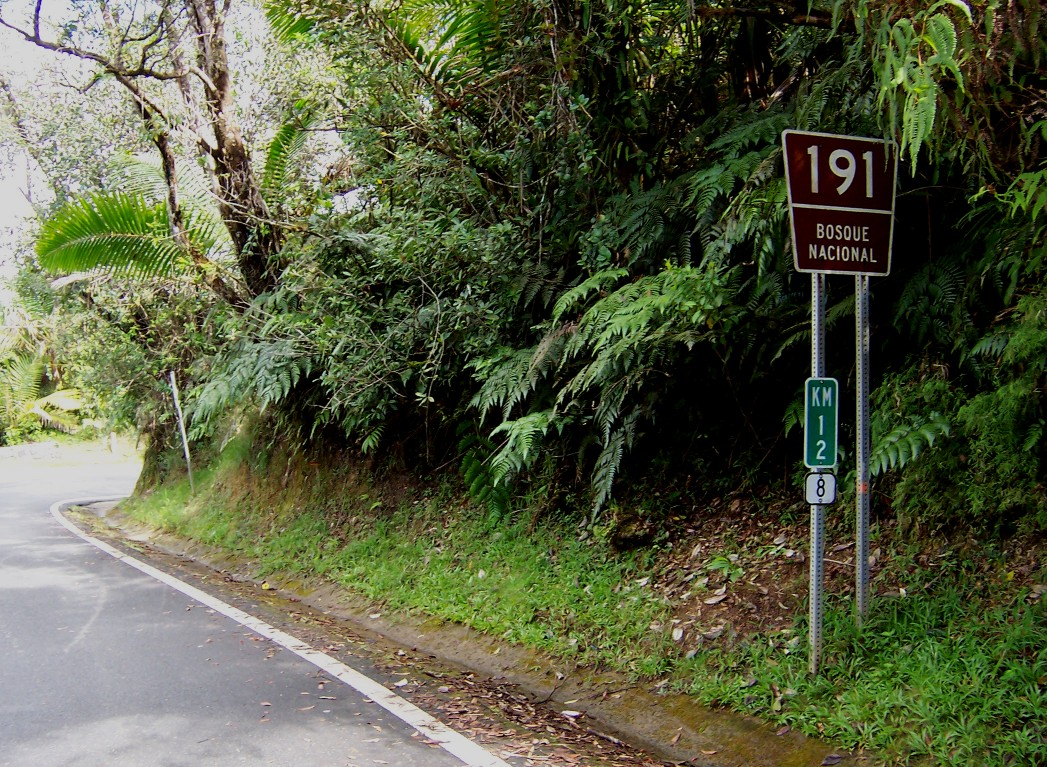
PR-191 1 km south of the terminus of the northern section (northbound)

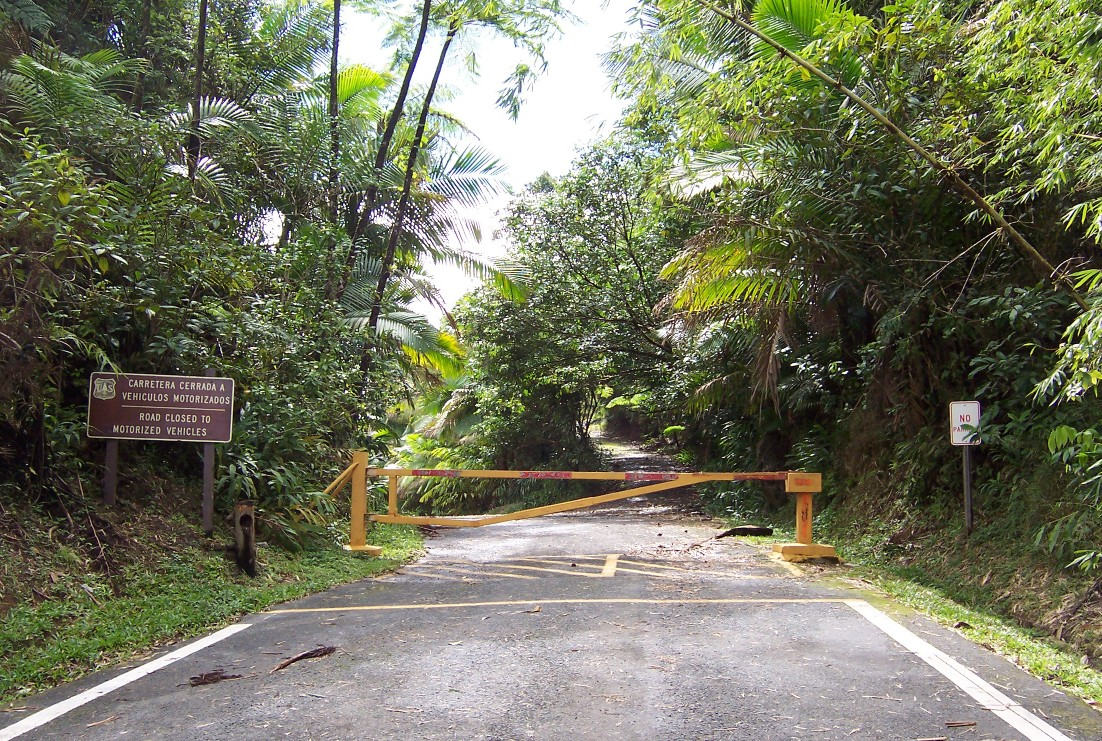
Terminus of the northern section of PR-191 (southbound)

=== Southern section ===
The highway continues south out of El Yunque National Forest passing Sector Florida and ending again at PR-31, near Río Blanco in the municipality of Naguabo.

== Major intersections ==
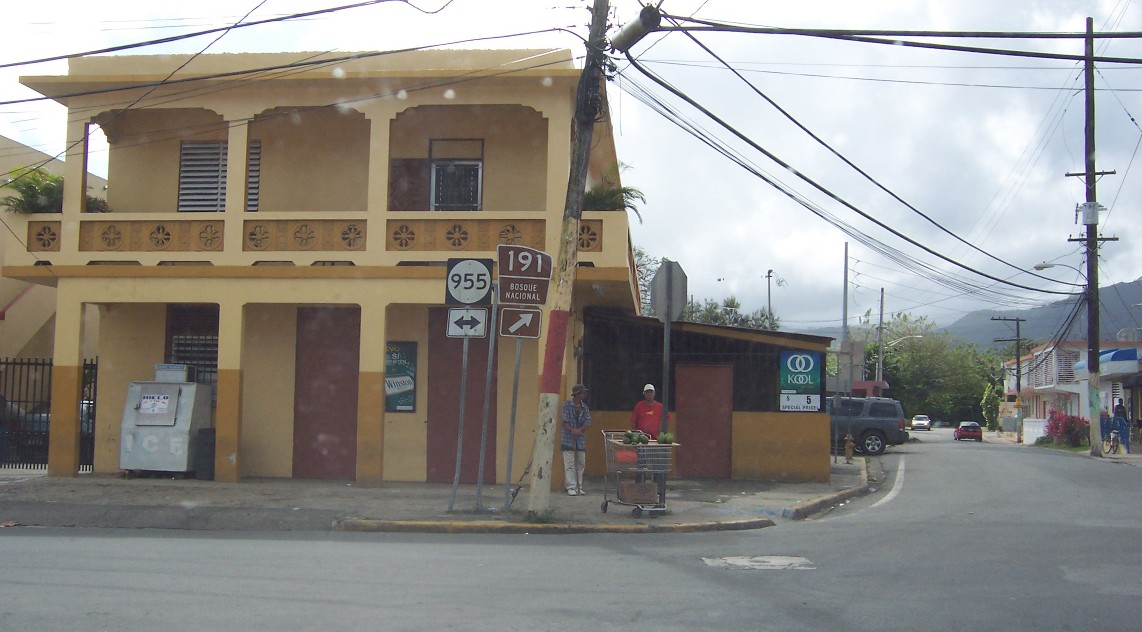
The beginning of PR-191 in Palmer at PR-955 (facing south)

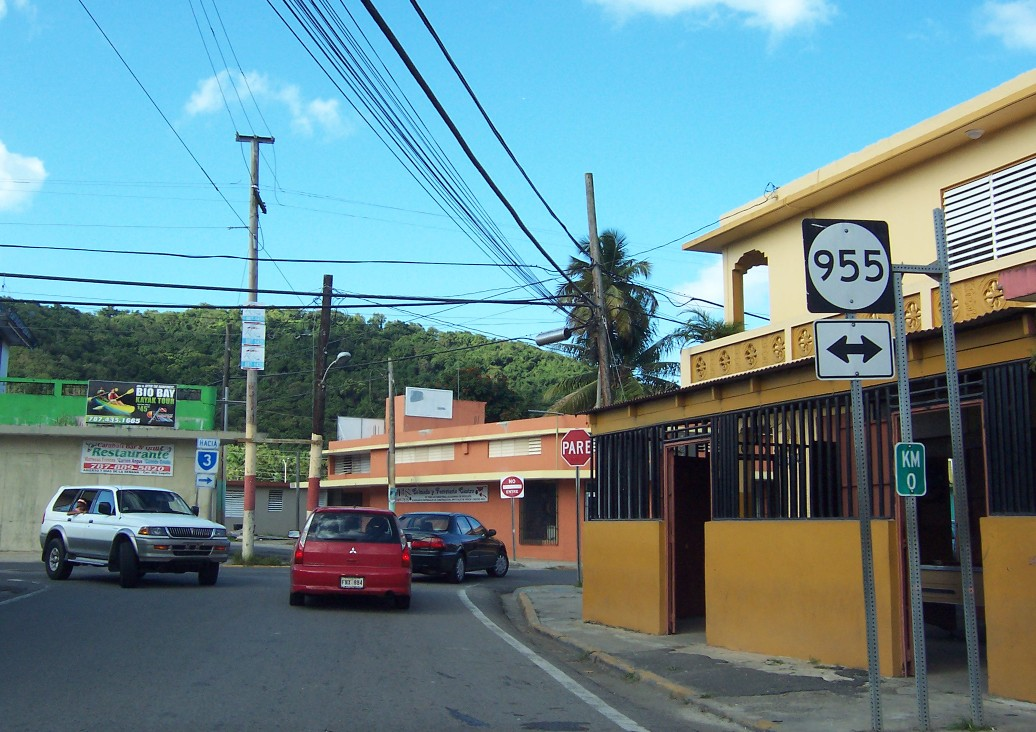
The beginning of PR-191 in Palmer at PR-955 (facing north)

Municipality	Location	km	mi	Destinations	Notes
Naguabo	Río Blanco	0.0	0.0	PR-31 – Naguabo, Juncos	Southern terminus of PR-191
Naguabo	Río Blanco	2.7	1.7	PR-969 – Maizales	
Naguabo	Río Blanco	9.4– 9.5	5.8– 5.9	El Yunque National Forest southern boundary	
Naguabo	Río Blanco	10.8	6.7	Northern terminus of southern segment at Río Sabana Recreation Area; dead end road	
Gap in route
Río Grande	Mameyes II	13.2	8.2	PR-9938 – El Yunque National Forest	Southern terminus of northern segment; one-way street
Río Grande	Mameyes II	13.1	8.1	PR-930 – El Yunque National Forest	Closed
Río Grande	Mameyes II	12.7	7.9	PR-9938 – El Yunque National Forest	One-way street
Río Grande	Mameyes II	12.4	7.7	PR-930 – El Yunque National Forest	Closed
Río Grande	Mameyes II	6.6	4.1	PR-9966 – Jiménez	Carretera Jiménez As of April, 2025, this road is considered historic.
Río Grande	Mameyes II	4.4	2.7	PR-988 – El Yunque National Forest	
Río Grande	Mameyes II	4.2	2.6	El Yunque National Forest northern boundary	
Río Grande	Mameyes II	4.0	2.5	PR-990 – Mameyes II	
Río Grande	Mameyes II	2.5– 2.4	1.6– 1.5	PR-961 – Mameyes II	
Río Grande	Mameyes II	0.3– 0.2	0.19– 0.12	PR-955 – Río Grande, San Juan, Luquillo	
Río Grande	Mameyes II	0.0	0.0	PR-3 – Río Grande, San Juan, Luquillo	Northern terminus of PR-191
1.000 mi = 1.609 km; 1.000 km = 0.621 mi: Closed/former

== See also ==
- Forest highway
- 1953 Puerto Rico highway renumbering
