= Puerto Rico Highway 955 =

Highway in Puerto Rico

Highway 955
- Ruta 955

Route information
- Maintained by Puerto Rico DTPW
- Length: 6.1 km (3.8 mi)

Major junctions
- West end: PR-3 in Jiménez
- PR-967 in Jiménez; PR-3 in Jiménez; PR-966 in Zarzal; PR-191 in Mameyes II
- East end: PR-3 / PR-968 in Mameyes II

Location
- Country: United States
- Territory: Puerto Rico
- Municipalities: Río Grande

Highway system
- Roads in Puerto Rico; List
← PR-939	→ PR-998

Puerto Rico Highway 955 (PR-955) is an east–west road located entirely in the municipality of Río Grande, Puerto Rico. With a length of 6.1 kilometers (3.8 mi), it begins at its intersection with PR-3 in Jiménez barrio, staying parallel to PR-3 through Zarzal barrio until its end at its junction with PR-3 and PR-968 in Mameyes II barrio.

== Major intersections ==
The entire route is located in Río Grande.

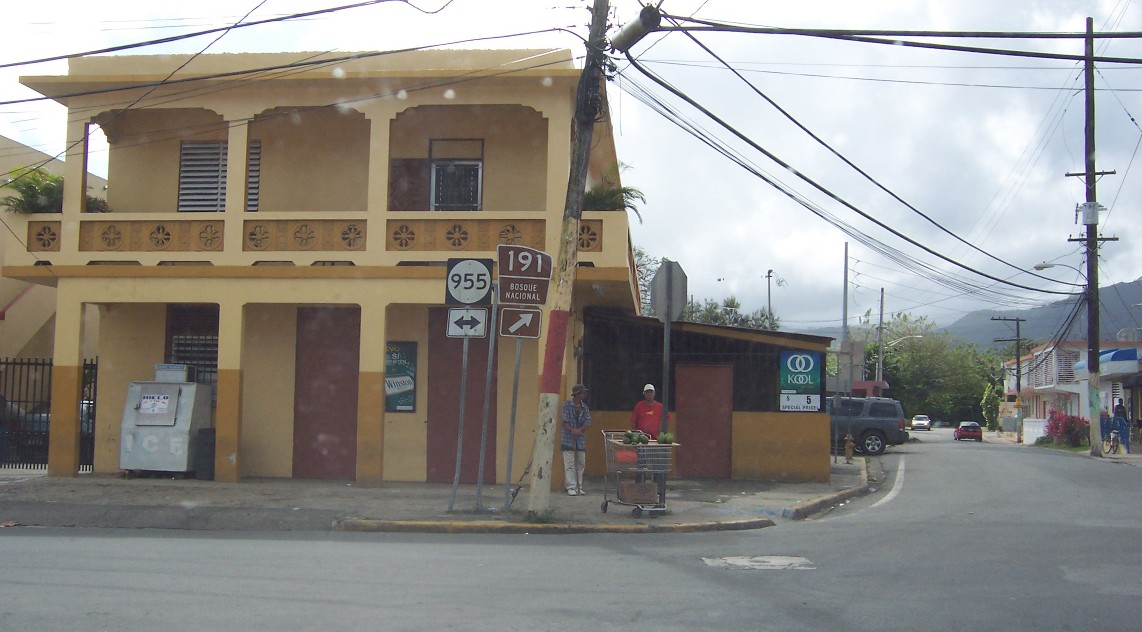
PR-191 south at PR-955 junction in Mameyes II barrio

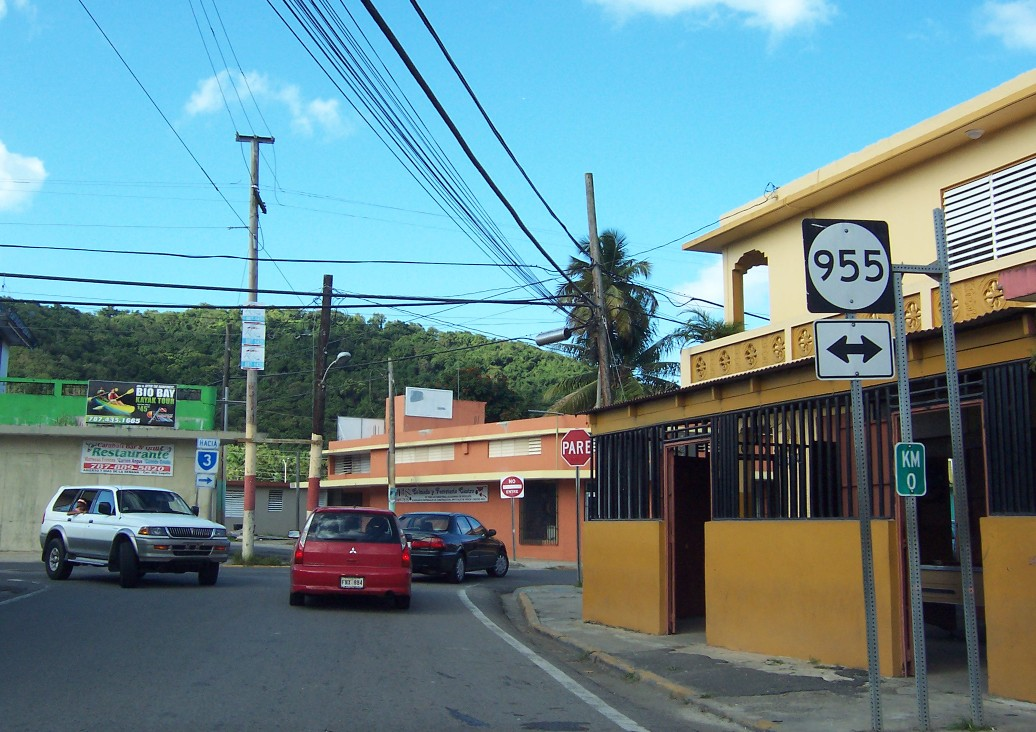
PR-191 north at PR-955 junction

Location	km	mi	Destinations	Notes
Jiménez	0.0	0.0	PR-3 – Río Grande	Western terminus of PR-955; no access to eastbound
Jiménez	0.6	0.37	PR-967 to PR-3 – Jiménez	
Jiménez	0.9 27.0 (Note: Kilometer markers represent the distance along PR-3 rather than PR-955.)	0.56 16.8	PR-3 – Río Grande	Western terminus of PR-3 concurrency; no access to eastbound
Jiménez	27.2 1.0	16.9 0.62	PR-3 – Río Grande, Luquillo	Eastern terminus of PR-3 concurrency
Zarzal	2.8	1.7	To PR-3 / PR-Calle A – Río Grande, Luquillo	
Zarzal	3.6– 3.7	2.2– 2.3	To PR-3 – Río Grande, Luquillo	
Zarzal	4.0	2.5	To PR-3 – Río Grande, Luquillo	
Zarzal	4.7	2.9	PR-966 – Zarzal	
Mameyes II	5.7– 5.8	3.5– 3.6	PR-191 – El Yunque National Forest	No access to northbound
Mameyes II	6.1	3.8	PR-3 – Río Grande, Luquillo	Eastern terminus of PR-955 and southern terminus of PR-968
Mameyes II	6.1	3.8	PR-968	Continuation beyond PR-3
1.000 mi = 1.609 km; 1.000 km = 0.621 mi: Concurrency terminus; Incomplete access
