= Mameyes II =

Barrio of Río Grande, Puerto Rico

- Barrio
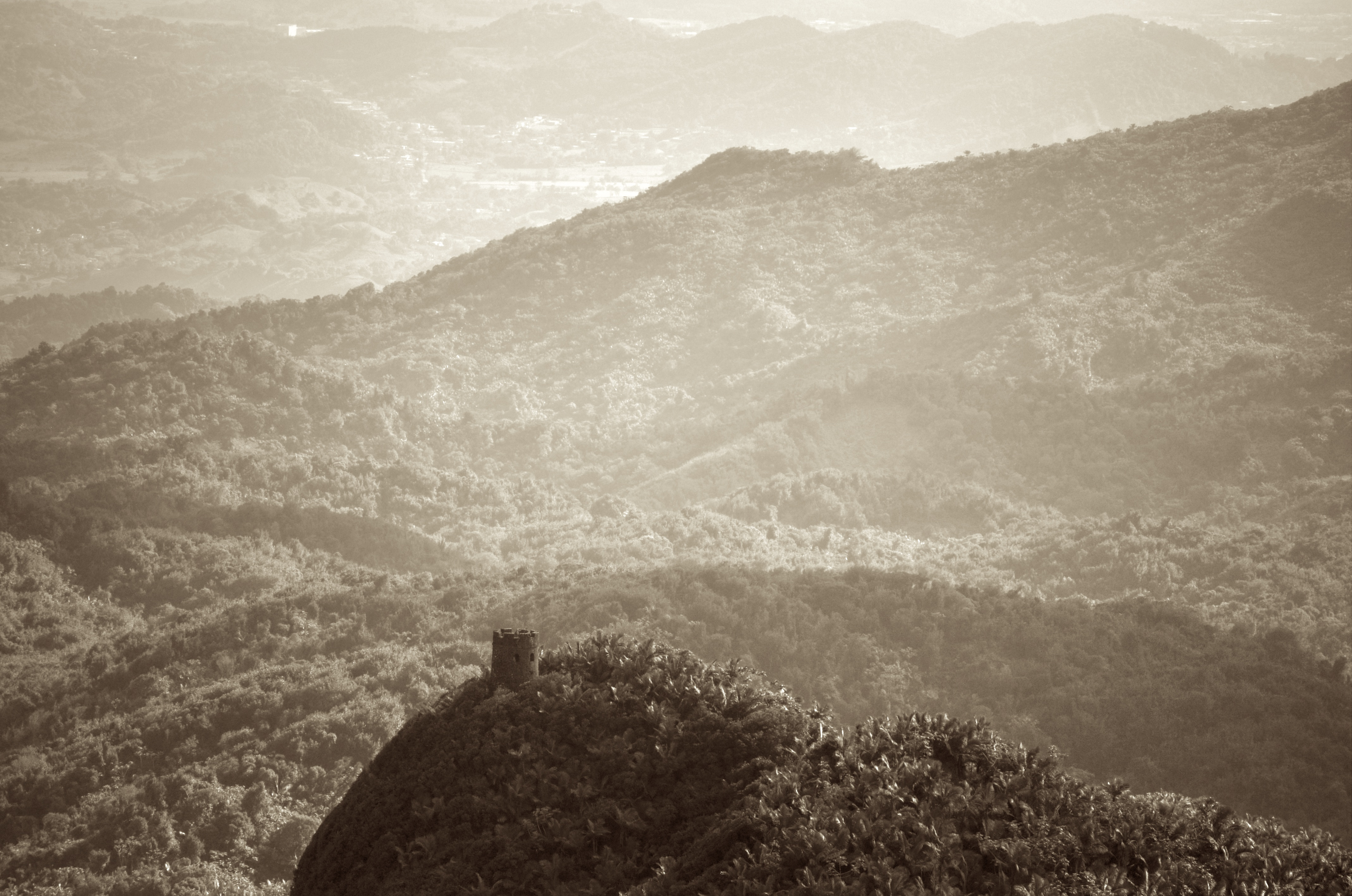
- El Yunque Rain Forest and Mt. Britton Tower as seen from Mameyes II

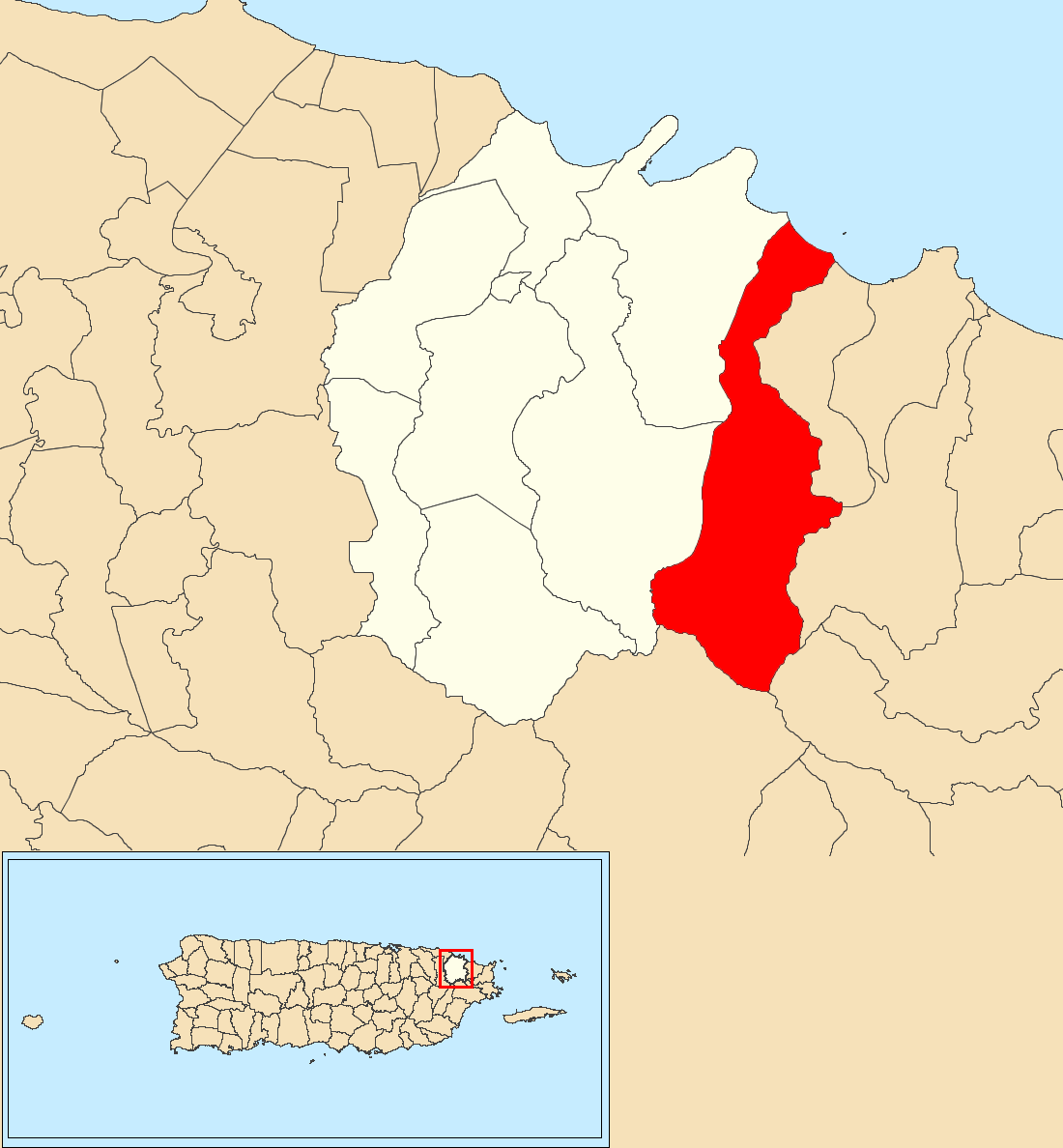
- Location of Mameyes II within the municipality of Río Grande shown in red

- Location of Puerto Rico
- Coordinates: 18°20′26″N 65°45′56″W
- Commonwealth: Puerto Rico
- Municipality: Río Grande

Area
  - Total: 10.89 sq mi (28.2 km^{2})
  - Land: 10.63 sq mi (27.5 km^{2})
  - Water: 0.26 sq mi (0.67 km^{2})
- Elevation: 1,276 ft (389 m)

Population (2010)
  - Total: 2,732
  - Density: 257/sq mi (99/km^{2})
- Source: 2010 Census
- Time zone: UTC−4 (AST)

Mameyes II is a barrio in the municipality of Río Grande, Puerto Rico. Its population in 2010 was 2,732.

== History ==
Mameyes II was in Spain's gazetteers until Puerto Rico was ceded by Spain in the aftermath of the Spanish–American War under the terms of the Treaty of Paris of 1898 and became an unincorporated territory of the United States. In 1899, the United States Department of War conducted a census of Puerto Rico finding that the population of Mameyes II barrio was 2,070.

Historical population
Census	Pop.	Note	%±
1900	2,070		—
1910	1,683		−18.7%
1920	2,148		27.6%
1930	2,457		14.4%
1940	2,397		−2.4%
1950	1,704		−28.9%
1960	2,094		22.9%
1970	2,087		−0.3%
1980	2,282		9.3%
1990	2,723		19.3%
2000	2,919		7.2%
2010	2,732		−6.4%
U.S. Decennial Census; 1899 (shown as 1900) 1910-1930; 1930-1950 1980-2000 2010

== Features ==
Several upscale resorts are located in Mameyes II.

== Sectors ==
Barrios (which are, in contemporary times, roughly comparable to minor civil divisions) in turn are further subdivided into smaller local populated place areas/units called sectores (sectors in English). The types of sectores may vary, from normally sector to urbanización to reparto to barriada to residencial, among others.

The following sectors are in Mameyes II barrio:

Apartamentos Beacon Hills Terrace, Apartamentos Río Mar, Apartamentos Villa Las Brisas, Área Forestal del Yunque, Barcelona, Condominio Ocean Sixteen, Condominio Villas del Carmen, Florida, Hill Side Village, La Vega, Parcelas Figueroa Nuevas, Playa del Yunque, Río Mar Village, Sector Palmer, Urbanización Beacon Hills Estates, Urbanización Colina, Urbanización Colinas del Yunque, Urbanización Las Vistas de Río Mar, and Urbanización Río Mar.

In Mameyes II is part of the Palmer comunidad.

== Gallery ==
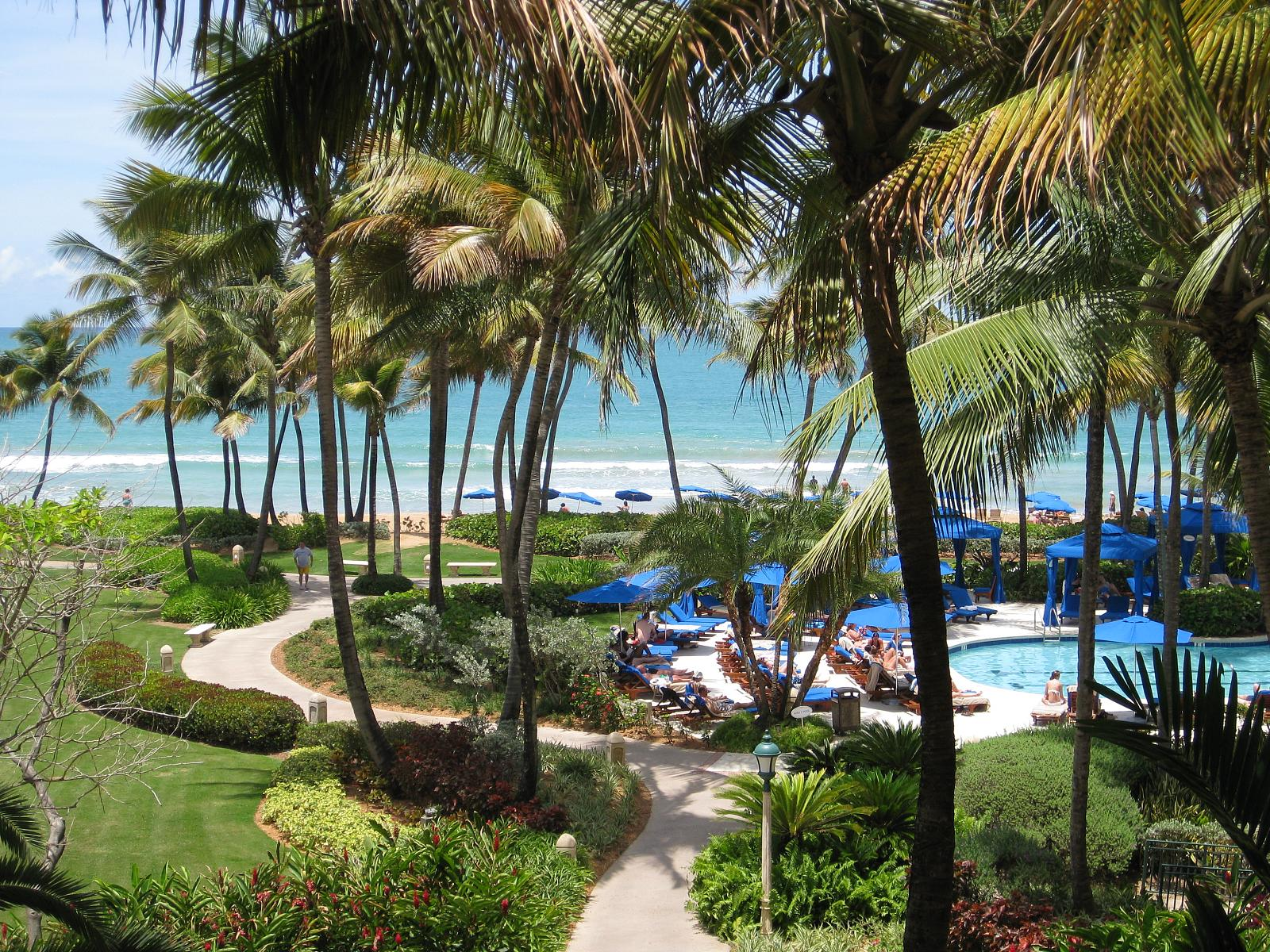
Rio Mar Beach Resort

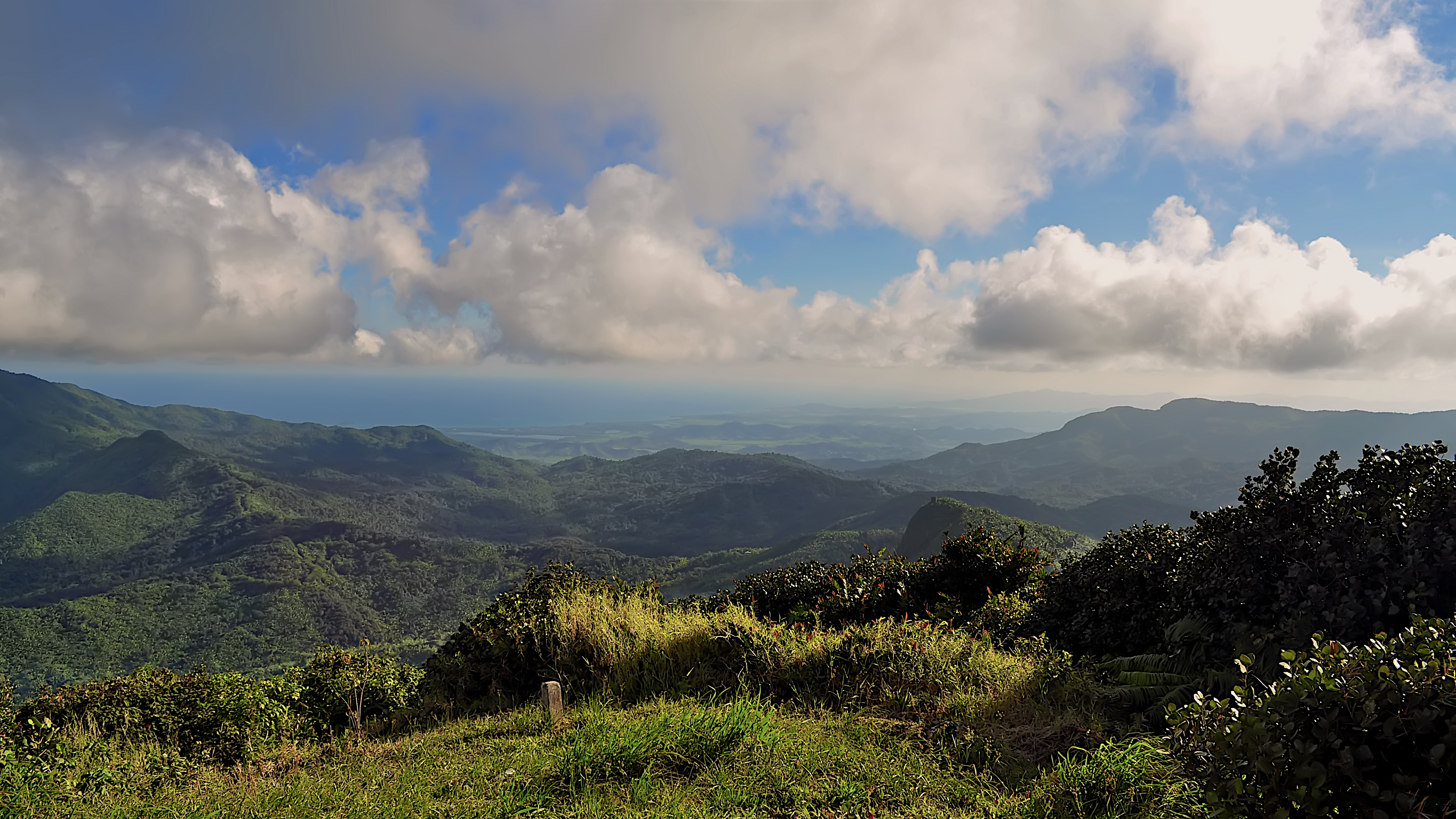
View from Mameyes II in 2010

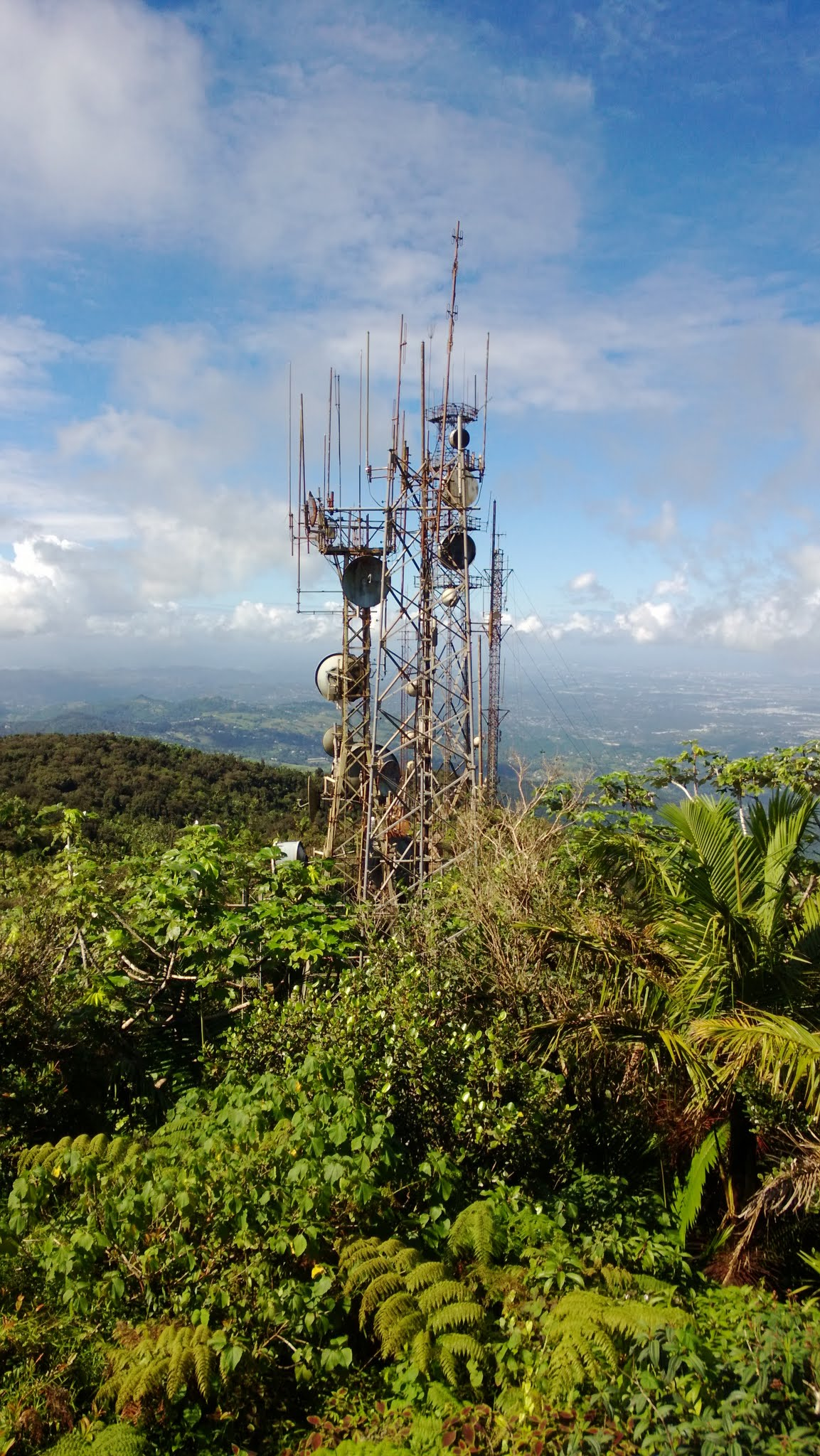
Towers atop El Yunque from Mameyes II on a clear day

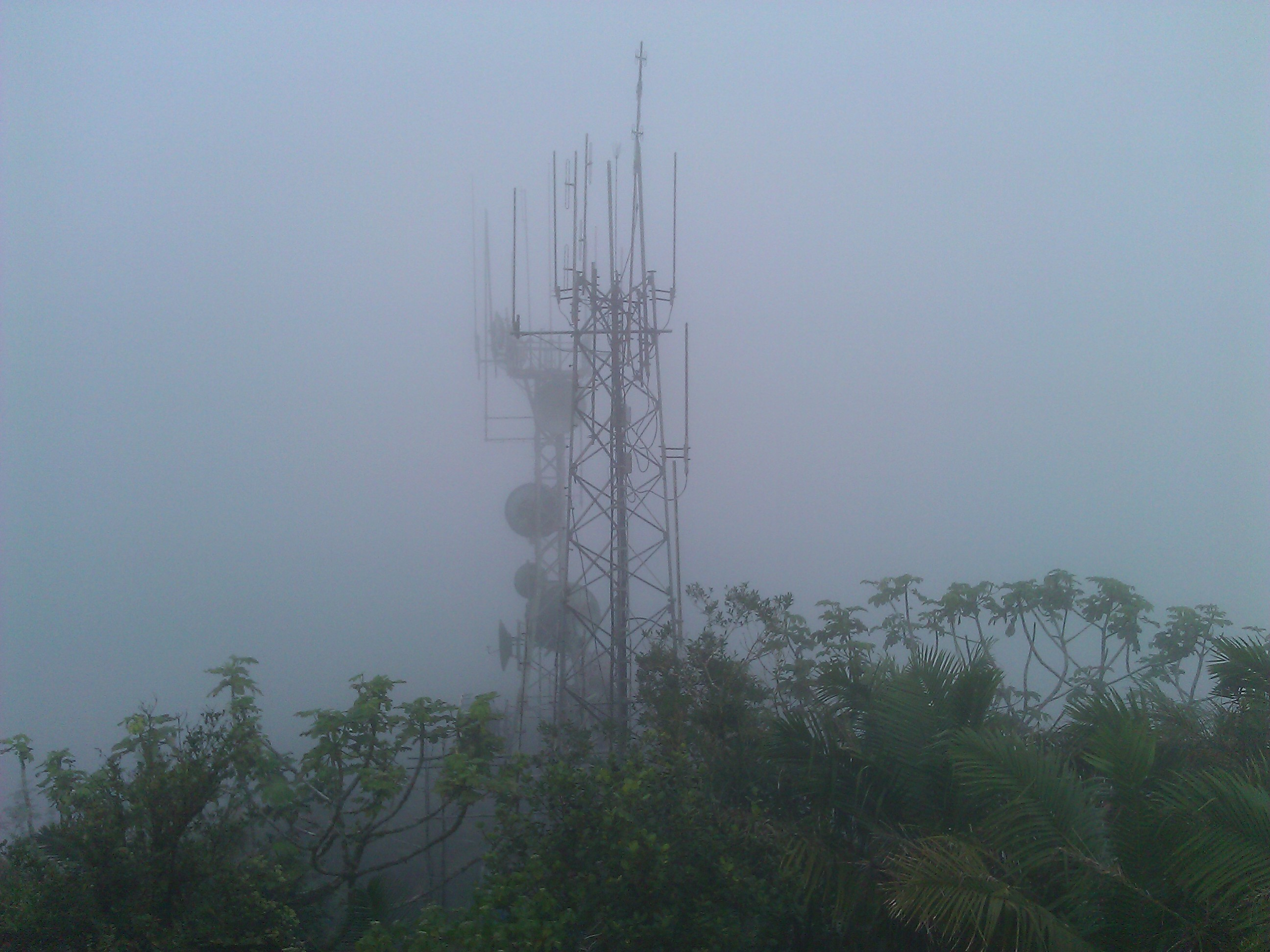
Towers atop El Yunque from Mameyes II on a cloudy day

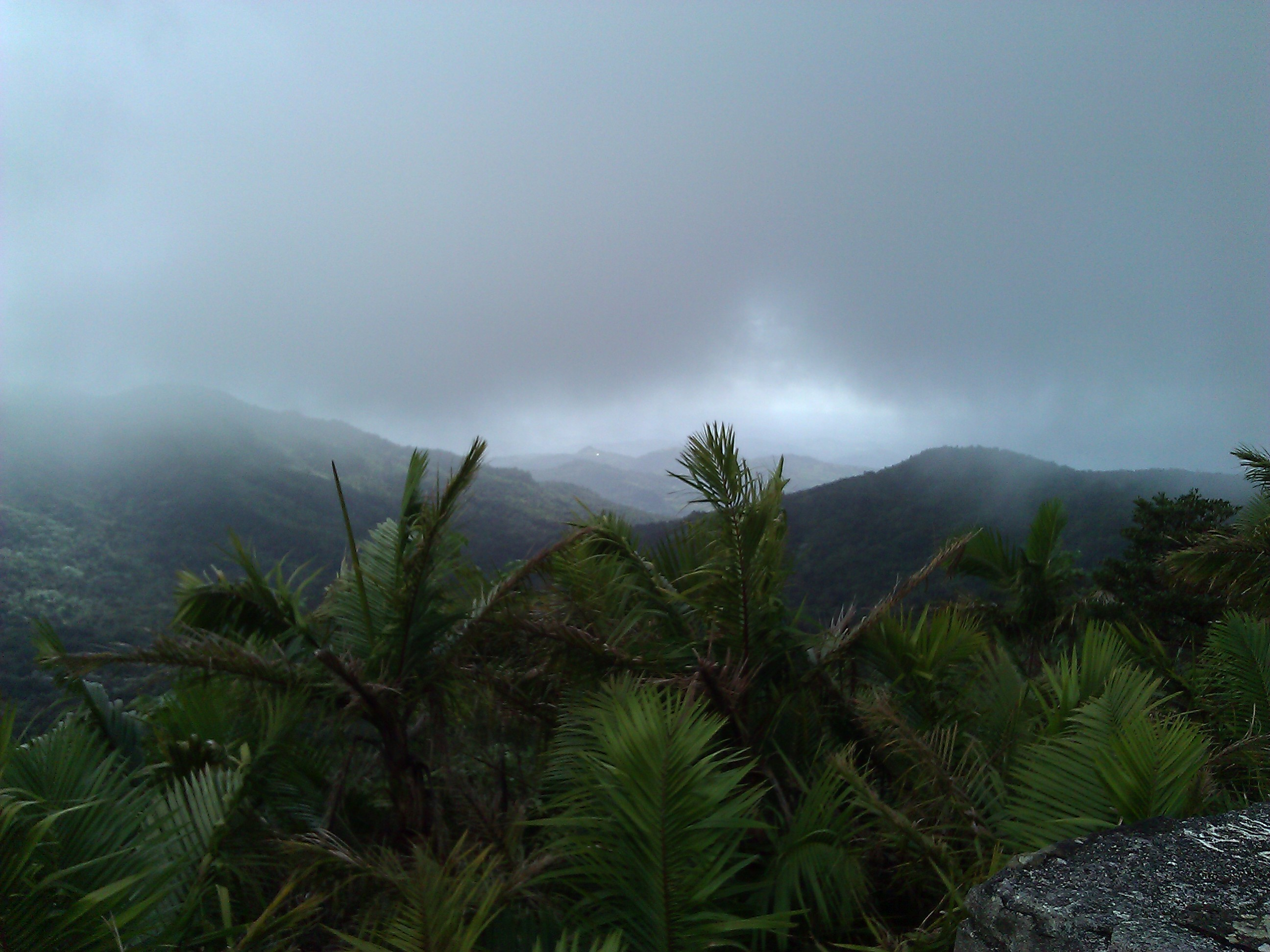
Panorama from Mameyes II in 2012

== See also ==
- List of communities in Puerto Rico
- List of barrios and sectors of Río Grande, Puerto Rico
